= New Edition discography =

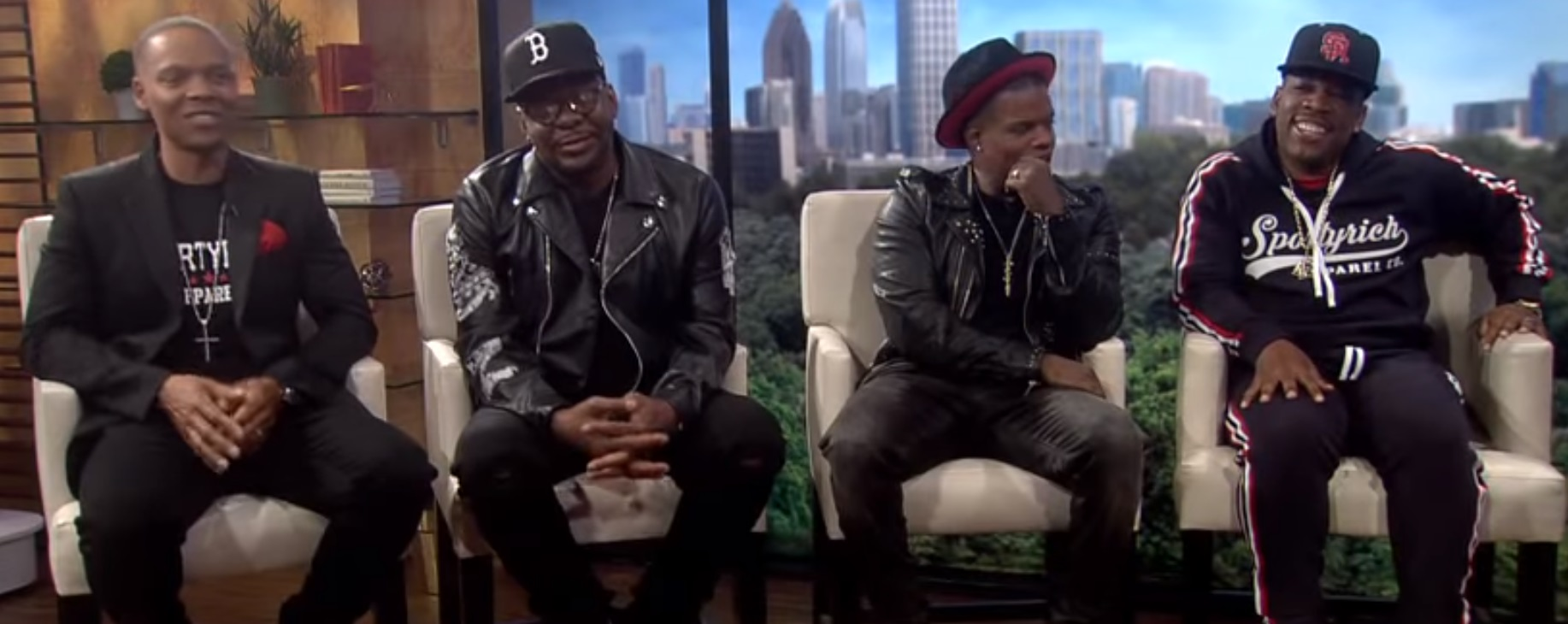
- New Edition in 2018
- Studio albums: 7
- Extended plays: 1
- Compilation albums: 8
- Singles: 32

American R&B vocal group New Edition were formed at the Roxbury section of Boston, Massachusetts in December 1982 by teenage singers Bobby Brown, Ralph Tresvant, Ricky Bell, Michael Bivins and Ronnie DeVoe. Under this lineup, they first signed with Maurice Starr's Streetwise imprint, issuing the bubblegum pop single, "Candy Girl", in February 1983. The song became their first number one US R&B hit and crossed over to the US and UK pop charts, peaking at number one in the latter, leading to the release of their debut album of the same name. Despite the relative success of follow-up singles "Popcorn Love" and "Is This the End", the album failed to be certified in any country and after a dispute with Starr over financial compensation following a world tour, they fired Starr and signed with MCA Records in 1984, releasing their self-titled multiplatinum sophomore album, which produced their signature hits "Cool It Now" and "Mr. Telephone Man", both songs peaking at number one on the R&B charts and crossing over to the top 40 of the Billboard Hot 100 in 1985.

Following the successful follow-ups, All for Love and Christmas All Over the World, group founder Brown was forced out of the group following their label demands to excise Brown out of the group due to his outrageous behavior at the time, a decision his bandmates regretted. Following the release of the covers album, Under the Blue Moon, in 1986, Washington, DC native Johnny Gill, already a veteran R&B artist, joined the group in late 1987 following rumors that Tresvant was to leave the group though he chose to stay after Gill joined. The lineup of Tresvant, Gill, Bivins, Bell and DeVoe released the new jack swing album, Heart Break in 1988. The album was a success with the singles "If It Isn't Love", "You're Not My Kind of Girl" and "Can You Stand the Rain" becoming top ten R&B singles, with "If It Isn't Love" successfully crossing over the pop charts at number seven. After its release and a nearly two-year concert tour to promote it, the band went on hiatus with each member starting either solo careers or, in the case of Bell, Bivins and DeVoe, forming their own splinter group, Bell Biv DeVoe. In 1996, they reunited with Bobby Brown for their most successful release to date, Home Again, which featured the hits "Hit Me Off" and "I'm Still in Love with You". In 2002, the group, sans Brown, released their seventh and their latest studio album, One Love, in 2004 on Bad Boy Records, following a successful exit from MCA Records, in which they eventually regained masters to all of their work from the label. The album was a relative failure and, along with their debut, are the group's only releases to not receive a certification from the Recording Industry Association of America.

In addition to their seven studio albums, the group has also issued eight compilation albums and released 32 singles (including two singles as featured artists). Since their debut, the group has sold over 20 million records worldwide.

== Albums ==
=== Studio albums ===
Title	Album details	Peak chart positions									Certifications (sales threshold)
Title	Album details	US	US R&B	AUS	CAN	GER	NLD	NZ	SWE	UK	Certifications (sales threshold)
Candy Girl	Release date: March 1, 1983; Label: Streetwise	90	14	—	—	—	—	—	—	—	
New Edition	Release date: September 28, 1984; Label: MCA	6	1	—	55	—	—	15	—	—	RIAA: 2× Platinum
All for Love	Release date: November 6, 1985; Label: MCA	32	3	—	—	—	—	50	—	—	RIAA: Platinum
Under the Blue Moon	Release date: October 10, 1986; Label: MCA	43	11	—	—	—	—	13	—	—	RIAA: Gold
Heart Break	Release date: June 20, 1988; Label: MCA	12	3	45	11	—	—	50	—	—	RIAA: 2× Platinum
Home Again	Release date: September 15, 1996; Label: MCA	1	1	13	1	63	46	11	43	22	RIAA: 2× Platinum; MC: Platinum
One Love	Release date: November 9, 2004; Label: Bad Boy	12	4	—	—	—	—	—	—	—	
"—" denotes releases that did not chart or were not released in that territory.

=== Compilation albums ===
Title	Album details	Peak chart positions		
Title	Album details	US	US R&B	AUS
Greatest Hits, Vol. 1	Release date: September 12, 1991; Label: MCA	99	78	140
New Edition Solo Hits	Release date: December 3, 1996; Label: MCA	—	—	—
Lost in Love: The Best of Slow Jams	Release date: November 17, 1998; Label: MCA	—	—	—
All the Number Ones	Release date: May 9, 2000; Label: Hip-O	37	7	—
Hits	Release date: March 2, 2004; Label: Geffen	—	58	—
20th Century Masters: The Best of New Edition	Release date: March 22, 2005; Label: Geffen	—	91	—
Gold	Release date: October 11, 2005; Label: Hip-O	—	—	—
Icon	Release date: 2011; Label: Geffen	—	—	—
"—" denotes releases that did not chart.

=== Christmas EP ===
Title	Album details	Peak chart positions
Title	Album details	US R&B
Christmas All Over the World	Release date: November 18, 1985; Label: MCA	45

== Singles ==
Year	Title	Peak chart positions										Certifications (sales threshold)	Album
Year	Title	US	US R&B	US Dan	AUS	CAN	GER	IRE	NLD	NZ	UK	Certifications (sales threshold)	Album
1983	"Candy Girl"	46	1	17	10	11	22	2	16	2	1	BPI: Silver	Candy Girl
1983	"Is This the End"	85	8	—	—	—	—	—	—	—	83		Candy Girl
1983	"Popcorn Love"	101	25	—	73	—	—	—	—	44	43		Candy Girl
1984	"She Gives Me a Bang"	—	—	—	—	—	—	—	—	—	—		Candy Girl
1984	"Cool It Now"	4	1	—	—	38	—	—	—	—	115	RIAA: Gold	New Edition
1984	"Mr. Telephone Man"	12	1	—	—	30	—	20	47	34	19	RIAA: Gold	New Edition
1985	"Lost in Love"	35	6	—	—	—	—	—	—	—	—		New Edition
1985	"My Secret (Didja Gitit Yet?)"	103	27	—	—	—	—	—	—	—	—		New Edition
1985	"Kinda Girls We Like"	—	87	—	—	—	—	—	—	—	—		New Edition
1985	"Count Me Out"	51	2	—	—	—	—	—	—	—	—		All for Love
1986	"A Little Bit of Love (Is All It Takes)"	38	3	16	—	—	—	—	—	—	153		All for Love
1986	"With You All the Way"	51	7	—	—	—	—	—	—	—	—		All for Love
1986	"Earth Angel"	21	3	—	—	52	—	—	—	30	153		Under the Blue Moon
1986	"Once in a Lifetime Groove"	—	10	9	—	—	—	—	—	—	—		Running Scared soundtrack
1987	"Tears on My Pillow" (featuring Little Anthony)	—	41	—	—	—	—	—	—	—	—		Under the Blue Moon
1987	"Helplessly in Love"	—	20	—	—	—	—	—	—	—	—		Dragnet soundtrack
1988	"If It Isn't Love"	7	2	20	—	21	—	—	—	—	94	RIAA: Platinum	Heart Break
1988	"You're Not My Kind of Girl"	95	3	—	—	—	—	—	—	—	—		Heart Break
1989	"Can You Stand the Rain"	44	1	—	—	—	—	—	—	—	—	RIAA: 2× Platinum	Heart Break
1989	"Crucial"	—	4	24	—	—	—	—	—	—	70		Heart Break
1989	"N.E. Heart Break"	—	13	—	—	—	—	—	—	—	—		Heart Break
1991	"Boys to Men"	—	—	—	134	—	—	—	—	—	—		Heart Break
1996	"Hit Me Off"	3	1	30	16	50	54	—	28	2	20	RIAA: Gold	Home Again
1996	"I'm Still in Love with You"	7	7	—	47	—	—	—	—	13	—	RIAA: Gold	Home Again
1996	"You Don't Have to Worry" (featuring Missy Elliott)	—	7	—	—	—	—	—	—	—	—		Home Again
1997	"Siempre Tu"	116	—	—	—	—	—	—	—	—	—		I'm Still in Love with You single
1997	"Something About You"	—	—	—	68	—	—	—	—	—	16		Home Again
1997	"One More Day"	61	22	—	—	—	—	—	—	—	—		Home Again
2004	"Hot 2Nite"	87	35	—	—	—	—	—	—	—	—		One Love
2004	"Last Time"	—	—	—	—	—	—	—	—	—	—		One Love
"—" denotes releases that did not chart or were not released in that territory.

=== Featured singles ===
Year	Title	Artist	Peak chart position	Album
Year	Title	Artist	US R&B	Album
1986	"King Holiday"	The King Dream Chorus & Holiday Crew	30	Non-album single
2016	"This One's for Me and You"	Johnny Gill featuring New Edition	20	Game Changer
