= One More Day (New Edition song) =

Single by New Edition

from the album Home Again
- Released: May 20, 1997
- Recorded: 1996
- Genre: R&B
- Label: MCA
- Songwriter(s): James Harris III, Terry Lewis, Al Jackson, Jr., Booker T. Jones, Donald "Duck" Dunn, Steve Cropper
- Producer(s): Jimmy Jam and Terry Lewis

New Edition singles chronology
"Something About You" (1997)	"One More Day" (1997)	"Hot 2Nite" (2004)

"One More Day" is the fifth and final single from the Home Again album. It was released in the US with a B-side featuring a Darkchild remix to "Something About You". Ricky Bell was the lead vocalist. All six members were featured as background vocalists.

Ricky Bell posted a tweet in 2017 about why he was the only one featured in the video, stating that the rest of the group "protested".

== Track listing ==
1. One More Day (Single Edit without Dialogue) – 3:57
2. Something About You (Dark Child Remixed Radio Version with Az Yet) – 3:31

== Credits ==
- Ronnie DeVoe – background vocals
- Bobby Brown – background vocals
- Ricky Bell – lead vocals and background vocals
- Michael Bivins – background vocals
- Ralph Tresvant – co-lead vocals and background vocals
- Johnny Gill – background vocals
