= Christmas All Over the World =

EP by New Edition
- Released: November 18, 1985
- Recorded: 1985
- Genre: R&B, soul, Christmas
- Length: 23:30
- Label: MCA
- Producer: New Edition; John Hobbs; Bill House; Richard Rudolph; Michael Sembello; Vincent Brantley; Rick Timas

New Edition chronology
All for Love (1985)	Christmas All Over the World (1985)	Under the Blue Moon (1986)

Professional ratings
Review scores
Source	Rating
AllMusic	2/5 stars
The Rolling Stone Album Guide	2/5 stars

Christmas All Over the World is a holiday EP by the American R&B group New Edition. It was released on November 18, 1985, by MCA Records. It was the group's only Christmas release. The EP was the final release to feature vocals from original member Bobby Brown, who was kicked out of the group after its release. The group reluctantly forced him out due to managerial concern of the group's image being tattered by Brown's multiple outbursts and erratic behavior due to his drug usage. Brown also intentionally missed several important rehearsal and performance dates that hurt the group's image. Brown would return for their sixth album, Home Again (1996).

The EP was a moderate chart success, peaking at number forty-five on the Billboard R&B Albums chart, and received mediocre reviews from most music critics.

== Track listing ==
No.	Title	Writer(s)	Producer(s)	Length
1.	"Give Love on Christmas Day"	The Corporation	Richard Rudolph, Michael Sembello	4:08
2.	"It's Christmas (All Over the World)"	John Hobbs, Bill House	Hobbs, House	4:15
3.	"Happy Holidays to You"	Mark Woods, Jr.	Rudolph, Sembello	3:52
4.	"All I Want for Christmas (Is My Girl)"	Cathy Block	Vincent Brantley, Rick Timas	3:11
5.	"The Joy of Christmas"	Ricky Bell, Ralph Tresvant	Tresvant, Bell	3:02
6.	"Singing Merry Christmas"	Michael Bivins, Ronnie DeVoe	DeVoe, Bivins	4:42

== Personnel ==
- Ricky Bell – vocals, arranger, producer
- Michael Bivins – vocals, arranger, producer
- Bobby Brown – vocals
- Ronnie DeVoe – vocals, arranger, producer
- Ralph Tresvant – vocals, arranger, producer, drums

== Charts ==
Chart (1985)	Peak position
US Billboard Top Soul Albums	45
