= Count Me Out (New Edition song) =

Single by New Edition

from the album All for Love
- B-side: "Good Boys"
- Released: October 14, 1985
- Recorded: 1985
- Genre: R&B, pop
- Length: 4:09 (radio edit); 5:37 (album version); 6:25 (Instrumental)
- Label: MCA
- Songwriters: Vincent Brantley, Rick Timas
- Producers: Vincent Brantley, Rick Timas

New Edition singles chronology
"Kinda Girls We Like" (1985)	"Count Me Out" (1985)	"A Little Bit of Love (Is All It Takes)" (1986)

Music video
- "Count Me Out" on YouTube

"Count Me Out" is a song released as a single by R&B/pop group New Edition from their All for Love album, released in September 1985 on the MCA label.

Much like the group's earliest single, "Cool It Now", again, lead singer Ralph Tresvant is warned by his friends (co-members Bobby Brown, Ronnie DeVoe, Ricky Bell and Michael Bivins) not to fall for a girl after he told them to "count him out" of any activities that they had planned.

The song's music video was notable for Brown's absence as he had broken from the group around the time of the video. Only Tresvant, DeVoe, Bell, and Bivins were in the video and parts of the song that originally belonged to Brown were lipsynced by Bell. Brown's vocals remain on the song. Despite a modest showing at number fifty-one on the pop singles chart, the song reached number two on the Billboard R&B singles chart.

New Edition appeared on the TV series Knight Rider performing "Count me Out" on Season 4 Episode 11.

== Credits ==
- Ronnie DeVoe – vocals, rap
- Bobby Brown – vocals, rap
- Ricky Bell – vocals, rap
- Michael Bivins – vocals, rap
- Ralph Tresvant – vocals, rap
- Vincent Brantley – vocal arrangements, songwriting, producer
- Rick Timas – all instruments, songwriting, producer

== Charts ==
Chart (1985–86)	Peak position
U.S. Billboard Hot 100	51
U.S. Cashbox Top 100	52
U.S. Billboard Hot Black Singles	2
