= The New Edition Story =

American TV series

- Genre: Biographical drama
- Based on: New Edition
- Written by: Abdul Williams
- Directed by: Chris Robinson
- Starring: Woody McClain; Algee Smith; Bryshere Gray; Elijah Kelley; Keith T. Powers; Luke James; Tyler Marcel Williams; Jahi Di'Allo Winston; Dante Hoagland; Caleb McLaughlin; Myles Truitt
- Narrated by: Wood Harris
- Theme music composer: Kenneth "Babyface" Edmonds; Antonio Dixon; James Harris; Terry Lewis
- Country of origin: United States
- Original language: English

Production
- Producers: Ricky Bell; Michael L. Bivins; Ronnie DeVoe; Bobby Brown; Johnny Gill; Ralph Tresvant; Jesse Collins; Stephen Hill; Debra Lee; Brooke Payne; Valerie Bleth Sharp; Chris Robinson
- Running time: 3 hr. 52 m.
- Production company: Jesse Collins Entertainment

Original release
- Network: BET
- Release: January 24 – January 26, 2017

The New Edition Story is an American biographical three-part miniseries about the R&B group New Edition, from their rise to fame as a boy band from the Orchard Park Projects of Roxbury, Massachusetts, to becoming a successful adult act. It was originally broadcast on BET from January 24 through January 26, 2017, becoming the network's first scripted miniseries. All six members of New Edition served as co-producers.

== Cast ==
=== Main cast ===
- Woody McClain as Bobby Brown
  - Tyler Marcel Williams as Young Bobby Brown
- Algee Smith as Ralph Tresvant
  - Jahi Di'Allo Winston as Young Ralph Tresvant
- Bryshere Y. Gray as Michael Bivins
  - Dante Hoagland as Young Michael Bivins
- Elijah Kelley as Ricky Bell
  - Caleb McLaughlin as Young Ricky Bell
- Keith Powers as Ronnie DeVoe
  - Myles Truitt as Young Ronnie DeVoe
- Luke James as Johnny Gill
- Wood Harris as Brooke Payne
- Faizon Love as Maurice Starr
- Tank as Jheryl Busby
- Michael Rapaport as Gary Evans
- Wallace Smith as Jeff Dyson
- Duane Martin as Louis Silas Jr.
- Yvette Nicole Brown as Shirley Bivins, Michael's mother
- Lisa Nicole Carson as Mae Bell, Ricky's mother
- La La Anthony as Flo Payne DeVoe, Ronnie's mother
- Monica Calhoun as Patricia Tresvant, Ralph's mother
- Sandi McCree as Carole Brown, Bobby's mother

=== Others ===
- Raven Bowens as Teasha Bivins, Michael's wife
- Bre-Z as Peanut Bell, Ricky's sister
- Bryan Terrell Clark as Terry Lewis
- Josh David as Al B. Sure
- Melvin Jackson Jr. as Kurtis Blow
- Wesley Jonathan as Michael Jonzun
- Ashley Wade as Whitney Houston - the girlfriend of Bobby, who later to be his wife and had a daughter.
- Krystal M. Harris as Zena, Ralph's ex-girlfriend
- Cynthia McWilliams as Sherry Carter
- D.C. Young Fly as Bobby Brown's barber
- Cynthia Rodriguez as Amy Correa Bell, Ricky's wife
- Rachel Currence as Shamari Fears, Ronnie's wife
- Chelsea Diggs-Smith as Amber Tresvant, Ralph's wife
- Jackie Long as Dr. Freeze
- Noel Braham as Ray Parker Jr.
- Stephen Hill as himself
- Maya Harris as Melika, Bobby's baby mama

== Development ==
=== Production ===
In August 2015, it was announced that BET commissioned the television film that would air as a three night miniseries. Five of the group's members--Ricky Bell, Michael Bivins, Ronnie DeVoe, Johnny Gill and Ralph Tresvant, had signed on as co-producers, while Bobby Brown did not. In addition, the band's longtime manager Brooke Payne had also been tapped as a co-producer and the film was to be written by Abdul Williams who wrote the 2010 film Lottery Ticket. Jesse Collins of the network's Real Husbands of Hollywood would serve as executive producer. Collins later reported that production would air in 2017. In April 2016, it was confirmed that Brown had also signed on as co-producer. It was also announced that ATL director Chris Robinson would direct the film. In November 2016, it was announced that iconic producers Kenneth "Babyface" Edmonds and Jimmy Jam and Terry Lewis had been recruited to oversee the music production.

=== Casting ===
Casting for the series began in Boston in January 2016. In April 2016, the network announced that Empire star Bryshere Y. Gray would portray Michael Bivins. The rest of cast included actor and singer Elijah Kelley as Ricky, R&B singer Luke James as Johnny, Algee Smith as Ralph, Keith Powers as Ronnie, and Woody McClain as Bobby Brown. In addition, Dante Hoagland, Caleb McLaughlin, Myles Truitt, Jahi Winston, and Tyler Marcel Williams would portray younger versions of Michael, Ricky, Ronnie, Ralph and Bobby respectively. In May 2016, La La Anthony, Yvette Nicole Brown, Monica Calhoun, Lisa Nicole Carson and Sandi McCree would join the cast as the mothers of the group members: Flo DeVoe, Shirley Bivins, Patricia Tresvant, Mae Bell and Carole Brown. Several others joined the cast later that month including Wood Harris as Brooke Payne, Michael Rapaport as Gary Evans, Wallace Smith as Jeff Dyson, Faizon Love as Maurice Starr, Duane Martin as Louil Silas, singer Tank as Jheryl Busby and actress/rapper Bre-Z as Peanut Bell.

== Promotion ==
The first trailer for the film was unveiled on June 26, 2016, at the 16th annual BET Awards. In July 2016, BET released a photo of the cast recreating the group's iconic album cover for the 1996 release Home Again. In September 2016, BET announced the official premiere date for the film which would air on January 24, 25 and 26, 2017. The network also released an extended trailer which highlighted the legendary onstage brawl between Bobby Brown and Bell Biv DeVoe after Brown went solo. The UrbanWorld Film Festival hosted an exclusive screening of several clips.

== Reception ==
=== Ratings ===
The film's premiere was watched by 4.2 million viewers, making it BET's most watched premiere since the 2012 season premiere of the sitcom The Game, which drew 5.2 million. The second and final episodes brought in 3.96 million and 4.23 million viewers respectively, making the miniseries the top rated cable program for three consecutive nights.

=== Critical ===
The New Edition Story has garnered positive reviews from critics. On Metacritic, the series holds a score of 76 out of 100. It currently has a 100% rating, with an average score of 7.2/10 on Rotten Tomatoes, along with the consensus being, "The New Edition Story colorfully showcases its subjects with honesty and clarity while offering an entertainingly paced overview that leaves room for plenty of the group's greatest hits". The film received rave reviews for the child actors who portrayed younger versions of New Edition in the first part of the series. Sylvia Obell of BuzzFeed praised the casting as "absolute perfection" and rated it an A+. Obell compared the film to another iconic television miniseries -- "it is on its way to being the best black TV biopic since The Jacksons: An American Dream" which aired on ABC in 1992. The most talked about similarities is the uncanny "jawdropping" striking resemblance of the young Bobby Brown, portrayed by Tyler Marcel Williams, who nailed the looks, demeanor and Bobby's most iconic "body roll". Also another uncanny resemblance were of the vocals of the young Ralph Tresvant, portrayed by Jahi Di'Allo Winston. For viewers, hearing his first lead solo appearance in the film singing "Candy Girl" gave chills for nailing every note. Trey Mangum of Blavity said that BET "outdid" themselves, saying "With the warm reception and open arms that the world received The New Edition Story with, is clear that this story needed to be told, and this was the perfect time." Mangum complimented the "spot-on" casting of both the young and adult casts, as well as the fact both casts recorded their own vocals, a rarity for musical biopics.

During an interview with Bell Biv DeVoe on the radio show, The Breakfast Club, co-host Angela Yee described the casting for the film as "fantastic." Michael Bivins praised Algee Smith's portrayal of Tresvant and said he was "real nice, sliding into the most difficult spot." In another interview, Ricky Bell along with Bivins praised Elijah Kelley for his portrayal of Ricky in the film. Bell further praised young actor Caleb McLaughlin for his portrayal as well.

== Broadcast ==
In June 2018, it was announced that The New Edition Story will stream on Hulu.

The miniseries is currently available for streaming through Paramount+ and BET+.

== Accolades ==
| Award | Year | Category | Nominee(s) | Result |
|---|---|---|---|---|
| NAACP Image Awards | 2018 | Outstanding Television Movie, Mini-Series or Dramatic Special | The New Edition Story | Won |
| NAACP Image Awards | 2018 | Outstanding Actor in a Television Movie, Mini-Series or Dramatic Special | Bryshere Gray | Nominated |
| NAACP Image Awards | 2018 | Outstanding Actor in a Television Movie, Mini-Series or Dramatic Special | Woody McClain | Nominated |
| NAACP Image Awards | 2018 | Outstanding Writing in a Television Movie, Mini-Series or Dramatic Special | Abdul Williams (Episode: "Part II") | Won |
| NAACP Image Awards | 2018 | Outstanding Directing in a Television Movie, Mini-Series or Dramatic Special | Chris Robinson (Episode: "Part I") | Nominated |
| Black Reel Awards | 2017 | Outstanding Television Miniseries or Movie | The New Edition Story | Won |
| Black Reel Awards | 2017 | Outstanding Actor in a TV Movie, Limited Series | Woody McClain | Won |
| Black Reel Awards | 2017 | Outstanding Actor in a TV Movie, Limited Series | Bryshere Gray | Nominated |
| Black Reel Awards | 2017 | Outstanding Actor in a TV Movie, Limited Series | Luke James | Nominated |
| Black Reel Awards | 2017 | Outstanding Supporting Actor in a TV Movie, Limited Series | Wood Harris | Won |
| Black Reel Awards | 2017 | Outstanding Supporting Actor in a TV Movie, Limited Series | Caleb McLaughlin | Nominated |
| Black Reel Awards | 2017 | Outstanding Director in a TV Movie, Limited Series | Chris Robinson | Won |
| Black Reel Awards | 2017 | Outstanding Writer in a TV Movie, Limited Series | Abdul Williams | Nominated |
| Black Reel Awards | 2017 | Outstanding Music (Comedy, Drama, TV Movie or Limited Series) | Barry Cole | Won |
| BET Awards | 2017 | Best Actor | Bryshere Gray | Nominated |
| BET Awards | 2017 | YoungStars Award | Caleb McLaughlin | Nominated |
| BET Awards | 2017 | YoungStars Award | Ace Hunter | Nominated |
