= I'm Still in Love with You (New Edition song) =

1996 single by New Edition

Single by New Edition

from the album Home Again
- B-side: "You Don't Have to Worry"
- Released: September 10, 1996
- Length: 4:39
- Label: MCA
- Songwriters: James Harris III; Terry Lewis; Johnny Gill
- Producer: Jimmy Jam and Terry Lewis

New Edition singles chronology
"Hit Me Off" (1996)	"I'm Still in Love with You" (1996)	"You Don't Have to Worry" (1996)

"I'm Still in Love with You" is a song by American R&B/pop group New Edition, released in September 1996, by MCA Records, as the second single from their sixth studio album, Home Again (1996). Written by group member Johnny Gill, the lead vocals are performed by Ralph Tresvant and Ricky Bell; all six members sing background vocals throughout the song. The video for "I'm Still in Love with You" was directed by Joseph Kahn and shot at Villa Vizcaya in Miami, once again featuring all six members. The song was a success on the US Billboard Hot 100 chart, peaking at number seven, and was the second single to be certified gold from the Home Again project.

== Critical reception ==
Larry Flick from Billboard magazine wrote, "For this sweet and romantic rhythm ballad, lead vocals are handled by Ralph Tresvant, whose smooth tenor range tingles with dewey-eyed youth appeal. As the song builds to a warmly harmonious climax, memories of New Edition's salad days will likely run rampant in the minds of longtime fans. Look for this one to heat up airwaves well into the fall season."

== Music video ==
The music video for "I'm Still in Love with You" was directed by Joseph Kahn, and took place in Villa Vizcaya, Miami.

== Track listings ==
- 12-inch vinyl
1. "I'm Still in Love with You" (LP version)
2. "You Don't Have to Worry" (vocal version) (featuring Missy Elliott)
3. "You Don't Have to Worry" (vocal version) (featuring Fat Joe)
- CD single
1. "I'm Still in Love with You" (single edit)
2. "I'm Still in Love with You" (acappella)
3. "I'm Still in Love with You" (intro version)
4. "You Don't Have to Worry" (vocal version) (featuring Missy Elliott)

== Personnel ==
- Ronnie DeVoe – background vocals
- Bobby Brown – background vocals
- Ricky Bell – lead vocals, background vocals
- Michael Bivins – background vocals
- Ralph Tresvant – lead vocals, background vocals
- Johnny Gill – background vocals

== Charts ==
=== Weekly charts ===
Chart (1996–1997)	Peak position
Australia (ARIA)	47
New Zealand (Recorded Music NZ)	13
US Billboard Hot 100	7
US Dance Singles Sales (Billboard) with "You Don't Have to Worry"	7
US Hot R&B/Hip-Hop Songs (Billboard) with "You Don't Have to Worry"	7
US Pop Airplay (Billboard)	16
US Rhythmic Airplay (Billboard)	4

=== Year-end charts ===
Chart (1996)	Position
US Top 40/Rhythm-Crossover (Billboard)	51

Chart (1997)	Position
US Billboard Hot 100	44
US Hot R&B Singles (Billboard)	39
US Rhythmic Top 40 (Billboard)	29
US Top 40/Mainstream (Billboard)	63

== Certifications ==
Region	Certification	Certified units/sales
United States (RIAA)	Gold	600,000
