= You Don't Have to Worry (New Edition song) =

Single by New Edition featuring Missy Elliott

from the album Home Again
- Released: October 22, 1996
- Recorded: 1996
- Genre: R&B; hip-hop soul
- Length: 5:21 (vocal version)
- Label: MCA
- Songwriters: Sean "Puffy" Combs; Chucky Thompson; Dwight Myers; Quinnes Parker; Daron Jones; Marvin Scandrick; Michael Keith; James Brown
- Producers: Stevie J; Sean "Puffy" Combs; Chucky Thompson

New Edition singles chronology
"I'm Still in Love with You" (1996)	"You Don't Have to Worry" (1996)	"Something About You" (1997)

Missy Elliott singles chronology
"Do Thangz" (1996)	"You Don't Have to Worry" (1996)	"Cold Rock a Party" (1996)

"You Don't Have to Worry" is the third single from New Edition's sixth studio album, Home Again (1996). The song was released as the remixed "vocal version" featuring female rapper Missy Elliott and as a B-side with the accompanying second single "I'm Still in Love with You". There is also an alternate version of the remix that features the vocals of Fat Joe, instead of Missy on the 12" single . The single version also features production by Stevie J and co-written credits by R&B group 112, while the album version credits production by Sean "Puffy" Combs and Chucky Thompson. All versions feature Bobby Brown and Ralph Tresvant on lead vocals. Additional rap verses from New Edition members Ronnie DeVoe and Michael Bivins are featured on the track as well.

== Music video ==
The official music video for the song was directed by New Edition member Michael Bivins along with Brian "Black" Luvar. The video premiered in December 1996 and received heavy airplay on BET.

== Track listings and formats ==
CD single

1. "You Don't Have to Worry" (No Rap Version Single Edit) — 3:49
2. "You Don't Have to Worry" (No Rap Version Radio Edit) — 4:21
3. "You Don't Have to Worry" (Vocal Version featuring Missy) — 5:21
4. "You Don't Have to Worry" (Vocal Version featuring Fat Joe) — 5:13
5. "You Don't Have to Worry" (TV Track) — 5:20
6. "You Don't Have to Worry" (Instrumental) — 5:19
7. "You Don't Have to Worry" (A Cappella Version featuring Missy) — 5:17
8. "You Don't Have to Worry" (A Cappella Version featuring Fat Joe) — 2:51

12" vinyl

1. "You Don't Have to Worry" (featuring Missy Elliott)
2. "You Don't Have to Worry" (featuring Fat Joe)
3. "You Don't Have to Worry" (Acappella Version) (featuring Missy Elliott)
4. "You Don't Have to Worry"
5. "You Don't Have to Worry"
6. "You Don't Have to Worry" (Acappella Version) (featuring Fat Joe)

1997 promo vinyl

1. "You Don't Have to Worry" (Missy Mix) — 4:26
2. "You Don't Have to Worry" (Fat Joe Mix) — 4:26
3. "You Don't Have to Worry" (LP Mix Clean) — 4:42
4. "You Don't Have to Worry" (LP Instrumental Mix) — 5:20

== Chart performance ==
Chart (1996)	Peak position
U.S. Billboard Hot Dance Music/Maxi-Singles Sales	7
U.S. Billboard Hot R&B Singles	7
