= Mr. Telephone Man =

1984 single by New Edition

Single by New Edition

from the album New Edition
- Released: December 8, 1984
- Recorded: 1984
- Genre: Pop; R&B; doo-wop
- Length: 3:58; 6:32 (remix)
- Label: MCA
- Songwriter: Ray Parker Jr.
- Producer: Ray Parker Jr.

New Edition singles chronology
"Cool It Now" (1984)	"Mr. Telephone Man" (1984)	"Lost in Love" (1985)

Music video
- "Mr. Telephone Man" on YouTube

"Mr. Telephone Man" is a song by New Edition, and the second single from their eponymous second album, New Edition. Released as a single, by December 8, 1984, it was being added to the most "Hot Black" radio station playlists.

== Overview ==
"Mr. Telephone Man" included lead vocals from Ralph Tresvant, Ricky Bell and Bobby Brown with a spoken by Michael Bivins and was written by Ray Parker Jr. It was originally recorded by teenage singer Junior Tucker, who included the track on his self-titled debut album on Geffen Records in 1983. Parker produced the original version as well as the cover by New Edition.

The single reached No. 12 on the Billboard Hot 100 singles chart and was the group's third No.1 single on the Black Singles chart. Mixes included the instrumental and the "Extended Version".

== Track listing ==
- 1. Mr. Telephone Man (Extended Version) – 6:30
- 2. Mr. Telephone Man (Instrumental) – 5:40

== Charts ==
=== Weekly charts ===
Chart (1984–1985)	Peak position
Canada Top Singles (RPM)	30
Ireland (IRMA)	20
Netherlands (Single Top 100)	47
New Zealand (Recorded Music NZ)	34
Spain Airplay (Top 40 Radio)	34
UK Singles (Official Charts)	19
US Billboard Hot 100	12
US Billboard Hot Black Singles	1
US Cash Box	9

=== Year-end charts ===
Chart (1985)	Rank
US Hot R&B/Hip-Hop Songs (Billboard)	14
US Cash Box	74

== Certifications ==
Region	Certification	Certified units/sales
United States (RIAA)	Gold	500,000^{‡}
^{‡} Sales+streaming figures based on certification alone.

== See also ==
- List of number-one R&B singles of 1985 (U.S.)
