= Orchard Park Projects =

Housing project in Massachusetts, US

Orchard Park Housing Projects
- Interactive map of Orchard Park Housing Projects

General information
- Location: 120 Eustis St, Roxbury, Massachusetts 02119 . Boston, Massachusetts; United States
- Coordinates: 42.33°N 71.077°W
- Status: Demolished

Construction
- Constructed: 1940–41

Listing
- Demolished: 1996–1998

Other information
- Governing body: Boston Housing Authority

Orchard Park, also known as "Home of New Edition," was one of Boston's most notorious housing projects, located in Roxbury, Massachusetts. It is also the former home of New Edition members Ricky Bell, Michael Bivins, Bobby Brown and Ralph Tresvant. The 350-unit three-story brick complex was built in 1941 and was demolished in 1998.

== History ==
Construction began in March 1941 and opened a year later to both African-American and Irish-American families. In the early 1960s, Orchard Park was very diverse, but by 1970 the majority of the complex were low income black families. When racial tensions in the area began to rise in the early 1970s, the Boston Public Schools system began busing black kids from Orchard Park and the nearby Lenox Street complex to schools in white neighborhoods in South Boston. This led to more riots and formation of gangs. Local juvenile gangs began to form in the housing projects for protection from rival gangs and the white gangs. Housing projects like Columbia Point also had begun to deteriorate throughout the years. Orchard Park was among those housing projects suffering from urban decay. During the mid-to-late 80s, crack cocaine dealers from New York began to move into Orchard Park.

The most well known drug dealer was Darryl "God" Whiting, who also introduced crack to the area. Whiting set up shop in Orchard Park and later became the biggest drug lord in Boston, operating on Bump Road. Whiting associates also formed a sub gang called the Orchard Park Trailblazers. OPT become infamous for violence and drug trafficking, mainly operating crack dens in and around Orchard Park.

In August 1996, Orchard Park was set for demolition. A year later, portions of Orchard Park were torn down. The buildings were finally razed in 1998 and replaced with a $159 million development called Orchard Gardens in 1999.
