= Hit Me Off =

1996 single by New Edition

Single by New Edition

from the album Home Again
- Released: July 29, 1996
- Recorded: 1996
- Length: 4:21
- Label: MCA
- Songwriters: Phillip "Silky" White; Dinky Bingham; Jeff Dyson; Ronnie DeVoe; Michael Bivins; Bob James
- Producer: Phillip "Silky" White

New Edition singles chronology
"N.E. Heart Break" (1989)	"Hit Me Off" (1996)	"I'm Still in Love with You" (1996)

Music video
- "Hit Me Off" on YouTube

"Hit Me Off" is a song by American R&B group New Edition, released in July 1996, by MCA Records, as the first single from the group's sixth studio album, Home Again (1996), as well as their first single in seven years. Featuring lead vocals from all six New Edition members, it samples "Storm King" by Bob James, "I Got Cha Opin" by Black Moon, and "One Nation Under a Groove" by Funkadelic.

"Hit Me Off" debuted and peaked at number three on the US Billboard Hot 100 while topping the Billboard Hot R&B Singles chart for three weeks, their fifth number-one hit on the listing. It sold 600,000 copies domestically and was certified gold by the Recording Industry Association of America. It was also certified gold in New Zealand, where it reached number two.

== Critical reception ==
Larry Flick from Billboard magazine described the song as "a smoker". He added, "Vocally, time has treated the lads extremely well. The high-pitched squeak and tenor harmonies have been replaced by swarthy machismo and mature baritone. Despite the individual styles developed via solo careers, the act's chemistry is well intact, and the members appear to have fallen into group mode with ease. They make excellent use of Silky's chilled jeep/funk groove (which pops with a cool sample from Blackmoon's 'I Gotcha Opin') and seductive chorus chant. Needless to say, this is a smash. Jam on it."

== Track listing ==
1. "Hit Me Off" (N.E. Spyder and Shaq D) – 6:00
2. "Hit Me Off" (The Trackmasters E.C. Joint) – 4:27
3. "Hit Me Off" ("G" Formulated mix)(version) – 5:01
4. "Hit Me Off" (Franktified club version) – 7:34
5. "Hit Me Off" (LP version) – 4:21

== Personnel ==
- Ronnie DeVoe – rap, background vocals
- Bobby Brown – lead and background vocals
- Ricky Bell – lead and background vocals
- Michael Bivins – rap, background vocals
- Ralph Tresvant – lead and background vocals
- Johnny Gill – lead and background vocals

== Charts ==
=== Weekly charts ===
Chart (1996)	Peak position
Australia (ARIA)	16
Canada Top Singles (RPM)	50
Canada Dance/Urban (RPM)	1
Canada (Nielsen SoundScan)	13
Europe (Eurochart Hot 100)	73
Europe (European Dance Radio)	5
Europe (European Hit Radio)	38
Germany (GfK)	54
Netherlands (Dutch Top 40)	34
Netherlands (Single Top 100)	28
New Zealand (Recorded Music NZ)	2
Scottish Singles Sales (Official Charts)	58
Spain (Top 40 Radio)	37
Sweden (Sverigetopplistan)	49
UK Singles (Official Charts)	20
UK Dance (Official Charts)	6
UK Hip Hop/R&B (Official Charts)	3
US Billboard Hot 100	3
US Dance Club Songs (Billboard)	30
US Dance Singles Sales (Billboard)	1
US Hot R&B/Hip-Hop Songs (Billboard)	1
US Rhythmic Airplay (Billboard)	14

=== Year-end charts ===
Chart (1996)	Position
Canada Dance/Urban (RPM)	6
New Zealand (RIANZ)	33
US Billboard Hot 100	86
US Hot R&B Singles (Billboard)	49
US Maxi-Singles Sales (Billboard)	49
US Top 40/Rhythm-Crossover (Billboard)	58

== Certifications ==
Region	Certification	Certified units/sales
New Zealand (RMNZ)	Gold	5,000^{*}
United States (RIAA)	Gold	600,000
^{*} Sales figures based on certification alone.

== Release history ==
Region	Date	Format(s)	Label(s)	Ref.
United States	July 16, 1996	Rhythmic contemporary; contemporary hit radio	MCA	
United Kingdom	July 29, 1996	12-inch vinyl; CD; cassette	MCA	
Japan	August 21, 1996	CD	MCA	

== See also ==
- List of number-one R&B singles of 1996 (U.S.)
