= Cool It Now =

Single by New Edition

from the album New Edition
- Released: August 27, 1984
- Recorded: 1984
- Genre: Post-disco
- Length: 5:47 (album version); 4:12 (single version); 3:37 (video version); 6:12 (extended mix); 6:06 (m&m mix)
- Label: MCA
- Songwriters: Vincent Brantley; Rick Timas
- Producers: Vincent Brantley; Rick Timas

New Edition singles chronology
| "She Gives Me a Bang" (1983) | "Cool It Now" (1984) | "Mr. Telephone Man" (1984) |

Music video
- "Cool It Now" on YouTube

"Cool It Now" is a 1984 hit single by American group New Edition, is the first single from their eponymous second album, New Edition. In the US, the song entered the Hot Black Singles chart on September 1, 1984 and reached number 1. In January 1985 the song peaked at number 4 on the Billboard Hot 100 chart. The song was produced by Vincent Brantley and Rick Timas. The lyrics depict a guy professing his love for a girl, despite growing concerns from his friends.

== Overview ==
With the group now signed to MCA Records, "Cool It Now" (and the album from which it came) was given more extensive and widespread promotion than any single from their previous album (which had been released through a smaller, independent label), and helped bring the group a bigger fan base. The song was the group's first top 10 pop single, peaking at number four on the pop chart, and their second number one R&B hit.

The song is notable for a midsection rap recited by Ralph Tresvant, which calls out the rest of the group: "Ronnie, Bobby, Ricky, and Mike." In later years, the rap was changed to include "Johnny" for the last member to join, Johnny Gill, either including his name as a fifth name called out or replacing "Bobby".

Robbers on High Street recorded a cover of the song for Engine Room Recordings' compilation album Guilt by Association Vol. 2, which was released in November 2008.

== Personnel ==
- Engineer – John Wood, Taavi Mote, Vincent Brantley
- Producer, Bass, Guitar, LinnDrum – Rick Timas
- Producer, Keyboards – Vocals - Vincent Brantley
- Remix – Louil Silas, Jr.
- Ronnie DeVoe – vocals, rap
- Bobby Brown – vocals
- Ricky Bell – vocals
- Michael Bivins – vocals, rap
- Ralph Tresvant – lead vocals, rap

== Charts ==
=== Weekly charts ===
| Chart (1984–1985) | Peak position |
|---|---|
| Canada Top Singles (RPM) | 38 |
| US Billboard Hot 100 | 4 |
| US Hot Black Singles (Billboard) | 1 |
| US Cash Box Top 100 | 2 |

=== Year-end charts ===
| Chart (1985) | Position |
|---|---|
| US Billboard Hot 100 | 26 |

== Certifications ==
| Region | Certification | Certified units/sales |
|---|---|---|
| United States (RIAA) | Gold | 1,000,000^{^} |
^{^} Shipments figures based on certification alone.
