= BBD (album) =

Studio album by Bell Biv DeVoe
- Released: December 18, 2001
- Recorded: 2000–2001
- Genre: Hip hop; R&B
- Length: 42:49
- Label: Biv 10/Universal
- Producer: Rockwilder; Them Damn Twins; Heavy D; Tony Dofat; Chris "The Arsonist" Jenkins; Junior "J-Nod" Etienne; Dave Hummel

Bell Biv DeVoe chronology
Hootie Mack (1993)	BBD (2001)	Three Stripes (2017)

BBD is the third studio album by American R&B group Bell Biv DeVoe, released in December 2001 through Biv 10 and Universal Records. It's the group's first recording since 1993's Hootie Mack.

== Critical reception ==
Professional ratings
Review scores
Source	Rating
AllMusic	2/5 stars
USA Today	3/4 stars
Vibe	1/5 stars

Jason Birchmeier from AllMusic said that despite some decent production, he was put off by the misogynistic slant in the group's brag and floss content, calling it "too harsh and too direct to be sexy […] too one-dimensional to appeal to anyone who is disinterested in hearing three guys channel their frustrations towards submissive, generic women with no voice." He concluded that, "[I]t's perhaps ironic that BBD's comeback album showcases precisely why the general public stopped caring about these guys in the first place. These guys went from "Candy Girl" to "Dance Bitch" and wonder why the masses grew weary." Barry Walters, writing for Vibe, felt the record "sounds more like contract fulfilment than musical inspiration", pointing out the lewd material that was implicit on "Poison" now being explicitly in the forefront, concluding that "the hardcore-playa front BBD erect to mask their pop past is just another bad creation."

== Track listing ==
Credits adapted from the album's liner notes.

No.	Title	Writer(s)	Producer(s)	Length
1.	"Sic' Wit' It"	James Glasco; Danielle Jones; Ricky Bell; Ronnie DeVoe; Sharard Dixon; Icarus	DJ Twinz	3:47
2.	"Da Hot Shit (Aight)" (feat. Shaheed 'The Poster Boy', Shamari Fears, and Jak Frawst)	Bell; Glasco; S. Dixon; Sean Williams; Deldrick Ford; Michael Bivins; DeVoe	Rockwilder	3:40
3.	"Breezy"	Dwight Meyers; Richard Smith; DeVoe; Austin Donawa; John Luks; Jonathan Short; Michael Brown; Bell	Heavy D; Tony Dofat	4:28
4.	"Shorty Gone Get It"	Robert Taylor; William Davison; Dorian Daniels; Bell; Icarus; DeVoe; Sean White	Epitome	3:31
5.	"Dance Bitch"	Junod Etienne; Davison; S. Dixon; White	Junod "J-Nod" Etienne	3:57
6.	"Pesos"	Etienne; Davison; S. Dixon	Junod "J-Nod" Etienne	3:39
7.	"Scandalous"	Janette Sewell; Davison; Steve Estiverne; S. Dixon	Steve Estiverne	3:55
8.	"I Ain't Going Nowhere"	DeVoe; Ken Francis; Chris Jenkins	Chris "The Arsonist" Jenkins	4:05
9.	"In My Crib"	Brandon Casey; Brian Casey; Lee Dixon; Pierre Medor; Dwayne Nesmith	Them Damn Twins; Da Corna Boyz (co.)	4:10
10.	"Since I Blew"	Dave Hummel; Dwayne Morgan; DeVoe	Dave Hummel	3:49
11.	"Home Alone"	Jenkins; DeVoe; Francis; Bivens	Chris "The Arsonist" Jenkins	3:48
