= Under the Blue Moon =

Studio album by New Edition
- Released: November 24, 1986
- Recorded: 1986
- Genre: R&B, doo-wop
- Length: 33:31
- Label: MCA
- Producer: Bill Dern (exec.), Freddie Perren, Ric Wyatt, Jr.

New Edition chronology
Christmas All Over the World (1985)	Under the Blue Moon (1986)	Heart Break (1988)

Under the Blue Moon is the fourth studio album by American R&B boy band New Edition by MCA on November 24, 1986. Their fourth album and third with MCA and first album after New Edition member Bobby Brown was voted out of the group, the group was going through a transitional phase during this period. It is their only album as a quartet. The album reached number 43 on the Billboard 200, and number 18 on the R&B albums chart. It was later certified gold by the Recording Industry Association of America (RIAA).

== Overview ==
=== History ===
New Edition recorded their cover version of "Earth Angel" for the soundtrack to the 1986 film The Karate Kid Part II. At the time of its recording, the cover was intended to be a one-off endeavor, but the popularity of the film and its soundtrack helped make the song a minor chart hit. This spawned the idea for the group to record an entire album of covers of popular doo-wop songs.

=== Release and reaction ===
The album went gold primarily because of the airplay received by "Earth Angel" and marked the end of the group's management and production obligation to Jump & Shoot Productions, leaving them free to sign a subsequent new deal directly with MCA Records.

In the UK, the album was released under the title "Earth Angel" on February 16, 1987.

== Track listing ==
All tracks produced by Freddie Perren; except "Bring Back the Memories" produced by Ric Wyatt, Jr.

No.	Title	Writer(s)	Length
1.	"Earth Angel"	Curtis Williams, Dootsie Williams	3:59
2.	"A Million to One"	Phil Medley	2:34
3.	"Duke of Earl"	Eugene Dixon, Earl Edwards, Bernice Williams	3:02
4.	"(Hey There) Lonely Girl"	Leon Carr, Earl Shuman	3:39
5.	"A Thousand Miles Away"	William Miller, James Sheppard	2:56
6.	"What's Your Name?"	Claude Johnson	4:36
7.	"Tears on My Pillow"	Sylvester Bradford, Al Lewis	3:56
8.	"Blue Moon"	Lorenz Hart, Richard Rodgers	2:23
9.	"Since I Don't Have You"	Jimmy Beaumont, Joe Rock	2:47
10.	"Bring Back the Memories"	Freddie Perren, Richard Wyatt, Jr.	3:39

== Personnel ==
New Edition

- Ricky Bell - vocals
- Michael Bivins - vocals
- Ronnie DeVoe - vocals
- Ralph Tresvant - vocals

== Charts ==
Chart (1986–87)	Peak position
New Zealand Albums (RIANZ)	13
US Billboard 200	43
US Billboard Top R&B Albums	11

== Certifications ==
Region	Certification	Certified units/sales
United States (RIAA)	Gold	500,000^{^}
^{^} Shipments figures based on certification alone.
