= Three Stripes (album) =

Studio album by Bell Biv DeVoe
- Released: January 27, 2017
- Studios: 916 Music Studios; Divine Mill Studios (New Jersey); Hot Beats Studios (Atlanta, GA); The Lab (New York, NY); Nu Shoez Studios; Forge Recording (Oreland, PA); Studio At The Palms (Las Vegas, NV); Studio Crib Zeno (Atlanta, GA)
- Genre: Contemporary R&B
- Length: 35:16
- Label: eOne
- Producers: B.A.M.; Carvin & Ivan; Cyrus Deshield; DJ Battlecat; DJ Ogee; DJ Shakim; Doug E. Fresh; Eric Hall; Erick Sermon; G-One; KayGee; Lil' Ronnie; LRoc; Michael Bivins; Quintin Gulledge; Rance; Rico Anderson; Silent Killers; Supa Nova; Zach Brunson

Bell Biv DeVoe chronology
| BBD (2001) | Three Stripes (2017) |

Singles from Three Stripes
- 1. "Run" Released: September 7, 2016; 2. "Finally" Released: 2017

Professional ratings
Review scores
| Source | Rating |
|---|---|
| AllMusic | 2/5 stars |
| Pitchfork | 5.5/10 |

Three Stripes is the fourth studio album by American R&B trio Bell Biv DeVoe. It was released on January 27, 2017 through Entertainment One. Recording sessions took place at 916 Music Studios, at Divine Mill Studios in New Jersey, at Hot Beats Studios and Studio Crib Zeno in Atlanta, at The Lab in New York City, at Nu Shoez Studios, at Forge Recording in Oreland, at Studio At The Palms in Las Vegas. Production was handled by several record producers, including Carvin & Ivan, Cyrus Deshield, DJ Battlecat, Doug E. Fresh, Erick Sermon, KayGee, Lil' Ronnie, LRoc, Rance, and BBD member Michael Bivins, with associate co-producer Gee Spin. It features guest appearances from Boyz II Men, Doug E. Fresh and SWV. The album peaked at number 18 on the Billboard 200, number 10 on the Top R&B/Hip-Hop Albums and topped the Independent Albums in the United States.

The album was preceded by the lead single "Run", which reached number 40 on the R&B/Hip-Hop Airplay and number 7 on the Adult R&B Airplay chart in the US. Its second single, "Finally", peaked at number 18 on the Adult R&B Airplay. The album's third and final single, "I'm Betta" didn't chart.

The album is the combined effort of all three of the group's original members; Ricky Bell, Michael Bivins and Ronnie DeVoe. The group continues to tour as part of New Edition.

== Track listing ==
| No. | Title | Writer(s) | Producer(s) | Length |
|---|---|---|---|---|
| 1. | "Ready" (featuring Doug E. Fresh) | Douglas Davis | Doug E. Fresh; Michael "DJ Shakim" Hicks | 1:07 |
| 2. | "Find a Way" | Ricardo Bell; George Archie; Nikita Akasha V. Kunar; Quinntin Brooks Smith; Raquan; Sammy Wagih Isaac | G-1 | 3:45 |
| 3. | "I'm Betta" | Bell; Michael Bivins; Ronnie DeVoe; Kier Gist; Gary S. Scott; Eric Hall; Cyrus Deshield; Rafael Dewayne Ishman | KayGee; DJ Ogee; Eric Hall; Cyrus Deshield (voc.) | 3:50 |
| 4. | "Hot Damn" | Bell; Bivins; DeVoe; Ocean Marciano; Matthew Cash; Aaron Gholar | Silent Killers; Supa Nova; G-1 (add.) | 3:03 |
| 5. | "Run" | Bell; Bivins; DeVoe; Erick Sermon; Corey Penn; Andy W. Armer; Christopher Wallace; Deric Michael Angelettie; Randy C. Alpert; Ronald Anthony Lawrence; Sean John Combs | Erick Sermon | 3:39 |
| 6. | "All Dat There" | Bell; Bivins; DeVoe; Ishman; Sean Johnson; Isaac Hayes III | Zach Brunson; Cyrus Deshield (co.) | 3:53 |
| 7. | "Don't Go" | Bell; Bivins; DeVoe; Quintin Ferbie Gulledge; Larrance Dopson; Kevin Gilliam; Deshield | Quintin Gulledge; Rance; DJ BattleCat; Cyrus Deshield (voc.) | 3:47 |
| 8. | "Finally" (featuring SWV) | Bell; Bivins; DeVoe; Deshield | LRoc; Cyrus Deshield (co.) | 3:40 |
| 9. | "One More Try" (featuring Boyz II Men) | Raquan; Carvin Haggins; Kenneth Gamble; Leon Huff; Jerry Butler | Carvin & Ivan; Rico Anderson; Michael Bivins | 4:32 |
| 10. | "Incredible" | Brandon Alexander Hodge; Ronnie Jackson; Aaron Sledge; Marquis Foxx | B.A.M.; Lil' Ronnie (voc.) | 4:00 |
| Total length: | | | | 35:16 |

Sample credits

- Track 5 includes an interpolation of "Hypnotize" by Notorious B.I.G., written by Randy Alpert, Andy Armer, Ronald Anthony Lawrence, Christopher Wallace, Sean Combs and Deric Angelettie.
- Track 9 includes an interpolation of "I Could Write a Book" by Jerry Butler, written by Kenny Gamble, Leon Huff and Jerry Butler.

== Charts ==
Chart performance for Three Stripes
| Chart (2017) | Peak position |
|---|---|
| US Billboard 200 | 18 |
| US Top R&B/Hip-Hop Albums (Billboard) | 10 |
| US Independent Albums (Billboard) | 1 |
