= Hootie Mack =

Studio album by Bell Biv DeVoe
- Released: June 22, 1993
- Recorded: 1992–1993
- Genre: R&B; funk
- Label: MCA
- Producer: Bell Biv DeVoe; Chris Stokes; Cyrus Melchor; Wolf; Epic Mazur; Daryl Simmons; L.A. Reid; Babyface; Rico Anderson; Kenyatta "Kelo" Williams; Fatin Dantzler; Lionel Caviness; Jay Wright; Anthony Velazquez

Bell Biv DeVoe chronology
WBBD-Bootcity!: The Remix Album (1991)	Hootie Mack (1993)	Bell Biv DeVoe's Greatest Hits (2000)

Professional ratings
Review scores
Source	Rating
AllMusic	link
Robert Christgau	C+

Hootie Mack is the second studio album released by R&B group, Bell Biv DeVoe. It was released through MCA Records on June 22, 1993, and featured production from the group itself and some of R&B's top producers such as Chris Stokes, L.A. Reid and Babyface. As the follow-up to the group's quadruple platinum debut album, Poison, expectations were high. Although Hootie Mack was not as successful as Poison, the album peaked at 19 on the Billboard 200 and 6 on the Top R&B Albums. Two singles made it to the charts—"Something in Your Eyes" and "Above the Rim", the former making it to 38 on the Billboard Hot 100. The album was certified gold on August 25, 1993.

== Track listing ==
No.	Title	Writer(s)	Producer(s)	Length
1.	"Nickel"	Chris Stokes; Cyrus Melchor; Jacques Kennedy; Louie Carr, Jr.; Ricky Bell; Michael Bivins; Ronnie DeVoe	Chris Stokes; Cyrus Melchor; Louie Carr, Jr.; Jacques Kennedy	3:17
2.	"Above the Rim"	Rico Anderson; Bell; Bivins; DeVoe; Mark Wilson	Rico Anderson	3:37
3.	"Lovely"	Carl Bourelly; Kennedy; Carr, Jr.; Bell; Bivins; DeVoe; Shonda Crable; Wilson	Carl Bourelly; Carr, Jr. (co.); Kennedy (co.)	3:52
4.	"Ghetto Booty"	Anderson	Anderson	3:52
5.	"Hootie Mack"	Kenyatta "Kelo" Williams; Carr, Jr.; Kennedy; Bell; Bivins; DeVoe; Hamilton Bohannon	Kenyatta "Kelo" Williams; Carr, Jr.; Kennedy	4:08
6.	"From the Back"	Richard Wolf; Bret Mazur; Bell; Bivins; DeVoe; Crable	Wolf & Epic	3:52
7.	"Show Me the Way"	Jay Wright; Anthony Velasquez; Bell; Bivins; DeVoe	Jay Wright; Anthony Velasquez	3:44
8.	"The Situation"	Williams; Bell; Bivins; DeVoe; Taina Monges; Crable	Williams	5:34
9.	"Something in Your Eyes"	Kenneth Edmonds	L.A. Reid; Babyface; Daryl Simmons	4:54
10.	"Please Come Back"	Fatin Dantzler; Lionel Caviness; Charles Robinson, Jr.	Fatin Dantzler; Lionel Caviness	4:32
11.	"Lost in the Moment" (CD bonus track)	Dantzler; Caviness	Dantzler; Caviness	5:27

== Charts ==
=== Weekly charts ===
Weekly chart performance for Hootie Mack
Chart (1993)	Peak position
Australian Albums (ARIA)	3
New Zealand Albums (RMNZ)	33
US Billboard 200	19
US Top R&B/Hip-Hop Albums (Billboard)	6

=== Year-end charts ===
Year-end chart performance for Hootie Mack
Chart (1993)	Position
US Top R&B/Hip-Hop Albums (Billboard)	75

== Certifications ==
Region	Certification	Certified units/sales
United States (RIAA)	Gold	500,000^{^}
^{^} Shipments figures based on certification alone.
