= One Love (New Edition album) =

Studio album by New Edition
- Released: November 9, 2004
- Studio: Big Daddy Studio (New York City, New York)
- Length: 62:02
- Labels: Bad Boy; Universal
- Producers: Big Chuck; The Co-Stars; P. Diddy; Chip Dixson; Dre & Vidal; Steve Estiverne; Ron Feemster; Stevie J; Jimmy Jam & Terry Lewis; Ryan Leslie; Nisan Stewart; Mario Winans; Mike Winans; Younglord

New Edition chronology
Home Again (1996)	One Love (2004)

Singles from One Love
- 1. "Hot 2Nite" Released: August 14, 2004

One Love is the seventh studio album by American R&B group New Edition, released on November 9, 2004 by Bad Boy and Universal Records. The group's first studio album since 1996's Home Again, One Love was conceived after their departure from MCA Records. Executive producer Sean Combs consulted a number of in-house producers to work with New Edition on their first project with his label, including Stevie J and Mario Winans apart from other collaborators such as Jimmy Jam & Terry Lewis and Ryan Leslie.

The album earned largely positive review from music critics who praised its production though some were critical with New Edition's shift in sound. One Love debuted at number twelve on the US Billboard 200 and number five on the Billboard's Top R&B/Hip-Hop Albums chart. It was preceded by lead single "Hot 2Nite," which peaked at number 35 on the US Hot R&B/Hip-Hop Songs chart. New Edition ultimately asked to be released from their Bad Boy contract amid disagreements with Combs on One Love's creative direction. To date, it is their last studio album.

== Background ==
By 2002, New Edition were performing as the quintet of Ralph Tresvant, Ricky Bell, Ronnie DeVoe, Michael Bivins and Johnny Gill, but they hadn't recorded a new studio album since 1996's Home Again. After having successfully fought to get out of their long-term contract with MCA Records (in which they eventually won back all their masters from the albums they recorded for that label), the re-energized group signed with Bad Boy Records the same year. However, it took nearly two years for the album to be released, as the group struggled with Sean Combs, Bad Boy CEO, over creative control. The album, titled One Love, was finally released in November 2004.

== Critical reception ==
Professional ratings
Review scores
Source	Rating
Allmusic	4/5 stars
Blender	3/5 stars
PopMatters	6/10
Vibe	3.5/5 stars

Rob Theakston from Allmusic found that "Diddy's production house has the magic touch and comes up with another winner of a record, One Love [...] The production is focused, mature, and fitting for a group with the members nearing their forties, even when the lyrics aren't [...] All in all, it's a cohesive statement and another victory for a group with such a publicly documented and tumultuous career. It's also another jewel in the crown for Bad Boy, but here's hoping Diddy gets the guys back in the studio immediately. Seven years between New Edition records is far too long and is inexcusable." PopMatters editor Mark Harris wrote that "the end result is that youngsters today will likely view this album as just another generic pop/hip-hop/R&B Bad Boy release – along the lines of 112 – and those old enough to remember New Edition may see it as a too-hip bastardization of the group's original sound. If they do dismiss it, though, they'll be missing out on a gratifying journey down memory lane. Misplaced hip-hop swagger aside, old fans and newcomers alike should find plenty to "love."

== Commercial performance ==
Early buzz and hype over the new album led to One Love debuting at number twelve on the US Billboard 200 and number five on the Billboard's Top R&B/Hip-Hop Albums chart. The group, however, wasn't pleased when "Hot 2Nite" (which they felt didn't cater to their maturing audience) was chosen as the album's first single. The song peaked at an underwhelming number thirty-five on Billboard's R&B singles chart, and number eighty-seven on the Billboard Hot 100. The underwhelming public reception of the album and its first single led to there being no more being released, while label promotion for the album also stalled. Angered over Bad Boy's poor promotion of the album, the group asked to be let go of their contract. The request was granted in November 2005. By April 2005, the album sold a mere 245,000 copies. After the stint with Bad Boy, original member Bobby Brown officially returned to the group making the group a sextet again. All 6 members have been touring together as New Edition since 2005, but have recorded no further studio albums since.

== Track listing ==
One Love track listing
No.	Title	Writer(s)	Producer(s)	Length
1.	"Conference Call"	Brooke Payne; Johnny Gill; Michael Bivins; Ralph Tresvant; Ricky Bell; Ron Feemster; Ronnie DeVoe; Shannon Lawrence	Feemster; Big Chuck^{[A]}	1:40
2.	"Been So Long"	Kandice Love; Michael "Carlos" Jones; Tresvant; Steven Jordan	Stevie J	4:23
3.	"Hot 2Nite"	Ryan Leslie	Leslie	3:23
4.	"Sexy Lady"	Adonis Shropshire; Jack Knight; Love; Jones; Jordan	Stevie J	4:27
5.	"Last Time"	Knight; Luke Larkin; Steve Estiverne	Estiverne	2:46
6.	"All on You"	Tresvant; Bell; Feemster; DeVoe; Lawrence; Jones	Feemster; Big Chuck^{[A]}	3:32
7.	"Wildest Dream"	Shropshire; Knight; Jones; Nisan Stewart; Tresvant	Mario Winans; Stewart; Sean "P. Diddy" Combs	4:13
8.	"Start Turnin' Me On"	Andre Harris; Vidal Davis; Gill; Tresvant; Ryan Toby	Dre & Vidal	3:38
9.	"Love Again"	DeVoe; Richard Frierson; Shropshire; Tresvant	Younglord	4:17
10.	"One Love Interlude"	Corte Ellis; Feemster; DeVoe	Feemster; Big Chuck^{[A]}	2:00
11.	"That's Why I Lied"	Neely Dinkins Jr.; Jordan; Vito Colapietro	The Co-Stars	3:55
12.	"Come Home With Me"	James Harris III; Terry Lewis; Gill	Jimmy Jam & Terry Lewis	3:16
13.	"Best Man"	Chip Dixson; Michael Winans Jr.	Dixson; Mike Winans	3:56
14.	"Re-Write the Memories"	Harris; Lewis; Tony Tolbert	Jimmy Jam & Terry Lewis	4:31
15.	"Newness"	DeVoe; Harris; Lewis; Tolbert; Tresvant	Jimmy Jam & Terry Lewis	5:27
16.	"Feelin' It"	Frierson; Jordan; Knight; Leslie	Younglord; Leslie	3:52
17.	"Leave Me"	Dixson; Michael Winans Jr.	Dixson; Mike Winans	4:05

Japan bonus track
No.	Title	Producer(s)	Length
18.	"Dream Girl"	Leslie; Combs	3:39

Notes

- ^{^[A]} denotes co-producer

== Charts ==
Chart performance for One Love
Chart (2004–05)	Peak position
US Billboard 200	12
US Top R&B/Hip-Hop Albums (Billboard)	4
