= All for Love (New Edition album) =

Studio album by New Edition
- Released: November 6, 1985
- Recorded: April–September 1985
- Studio: Studio Sound Recorders (North Hollywood, California)
- Genre: R&B, soul, pop, funk
- Length: 45:15
- Label: MCA
- Producer: Ricky Bell, Jheryl Busby (exec.), Michael Bivins, Vincent Brantley, Bill Dern (exec.), Ronnie DeVoe, Richard Rudolph, Michael Sembello, Rick Timas, George Tobin, Ralph Tresvant

New Edition chronology
New Edition (1984)	All for Love (1985)	Christmas All Over the World (1985)

Singles from New Edition
- 1. "Count Me Out" Released: October 14, 1985; 2. "A Little Bit of Love (Is All It Takes)" Released: 1986; 3. "With You All the Way" Released: 1986

All for Love is the third studio album by American R&B quintet New Edition, released by MCA Records on November 6, 1985. The album was certified platinum by the Recording Industry Association of America (RIAA). Also, this would be the final studio album to feature original group member Bobby Brown, who would shortly depart for a solo career until he would later return for their 1996 comeback album with the group, Home Again.

In the UK, the album was released on April 1, 1986.

== Overview ==
=== History ===
By Spring 1985, New Edition was one of the biggest pop acts in the world after the success of their self-titled second album released the year before. However, the group was now in mortgage to MCA Records, as a result of having borrowed money from the label to disentangle themselves from a stifling production deal they mistakenly signed during the recording of their previous album. As a result, All for Love would become the first in a cluster of albums the group would be forced to record during this period to work off its debt.

=== Background and Brown's Departure ===
While most of the members were comfortable with the group's direction, Bobby Brown was becoming increasingly discontent and unappreciative with its bubblegum pop image. Brown was also agitated at having not been more prominently featured as a lead vocalist on the album. Vincent Brantley, the album's main producer, had originally sought to give Brown more solo spots. However, MCA balked at this idea — insisting that Ralph Tresvant continue to be used on principal vocals. During a national tour in Oakland, California to promote the album, Brown often cut in on Tresvant's leads, performing more raunchily onstage, compared to his bandmates. Also, Brown angered the group's management by disrespectfully throwing his mike in the air and being ungrateful when not getting his way onstage. Growing tension between Brown and his bandmates eventually reached a standoff, which contributed to his being terminated from the group in December 1985. Following Brown's departure, New Edition would continue to promote All for Love as a quartet.

=== Release and reaction ===
Professional ratings
Review scores
Source	Rating
AllMusic	3/5 stars

== Track listing ==
No.	Title	Writer(s)	Producer(s)	Length
1.	"Count Me Out"	Vincent Brantley, Rick Timas	Brantley, Timas	5:37
2.	"A Little Bit of Love (Is All It Takes)"	Christine Perren, Richard Wyatt, Jr.	Richard Rudolph, Michael Sembello	4:05
3.	"Sweet Thing"	Rudolph, Sembello, Randy Waldman	Rudolph, Sembello	4:13
4.	"With You All the Way"	Carl Wurtz	George Tobin	3:30
5.	"Let's Be Friends"	David Conley, Bernard Jackson, David Townsend	Brantley, Timas	4:19
6.	"Kickback"	Brantley, Timas	Brantley, Timas	3:25
7.	"Tonight's Your Night"	John Duarte, Mark Paul	Tobin	3:34
8.	"Whispers in Bed"	Duarte, Paul	Tobin	3:40
9.	"Who Do You Trust?"	David Batteau, Danny Sembello	Rudolph, Sembello	4:10
10.	"School"	Ricky Bell, Michael Bivins, Ronnie DeVoe, Ralph Tresvant	Bell, Bivins, DeVoe, Tresvant	4:52
11.	"All for Love"	Duarte, Paul	Tobin	3:50

=== Non Album B-sides ===
- "Good Boys" (Ralph Tresvant, Ricky Bell) (3:50)
- "Sneakin' Around" (Ralph Tresvant, D. Eastman, B. Hart) (3:20)

== Personnel ==
- Ricky Bell – vocals, arranger, producer
- Michael Bivins – vocals, arranger, producer
- Bobby Brown – vocals
- Ronnie DeVoe – vocals, arranger, producer
- Ralph Tresvant – vocals, arranger, producer

== Charts ==
=== Weekly charts ===
Chart (1985–1986)	Peak position
New Zealand Albums (RMNZ)	50
US Billboard 200	32
US Top R&B/Hip-Hop Albums (Billboard)	3

=== Year-end charts ===
Chart (1986)	Position
US Billboard 200	26
US Top R&B/Hip-Hop Albums (Billboard)	6

=== Singles ===
Year	Single	Chart positions	
Year	Single	US Pop	US Soul
1985	"Count Me Out"	51	2
1986	"A Little Bit of Love (Is All It Takes)"	38	3
1986	"With You All the Way"	51	7

== Certifications ==
Region	Certification	Certified units/sales
United States (RIAA)	Platinum	1,000,000^{^}
^{^} Shipments figures based on certification alone.
