= New Edition (album) =

Studio album by New Edition
- Released: September 28, 1984
- Recorded: 1984
- Genres: R&B; pop
- Length: 43:13
- Label: MCA
- Producers: Jheryl Busby; Vincent Brantley; Rick Timas; Ray Parker Jr.; Richard Rudolph; Michael Sembello; Richard James Burgess; Peter Bunetta; Rick Chudacoff

New Edition chronology
Candy Girl (1983)	New Edition (1984)	All for Love (1985)

Singles from New Edition
- 1. "Cool It Now" Released: August 27, 1984; 2. "Mr. Telephone Man" Released: December 8, 1984; 3. "Lost in Love" Released: February 7, 1985; 4. "My Secret (Didja Gitit Yet?)" Released: March 3, 1985; 5. "Kinda Girls We Like" Released: July 1985

Professional ratings
Review scores
Source	Rating
AllMusic	4.5/5 stars
Robert Christgau	B+

New Edition is the second studio album by American quintet New Edition, released on September 28, 1984, in North America. It was their first album on MCA Records, and was also their first album without manager Maurice Starr, who would depart from the group during its production after the group accused him of stealing their monetary earnings from their platinum debut.

The album was produced by Vincent Brantley, Rick Timas, Grammy-nominated producer Michael Sembello, Richard Rudolph, Ray Parker Jr., Peter Bunetta, and Rick Chudacoff. The album reached number 6 on the Billboard 200, and was certified double platinum by the Recording Industry Association of America (RIAA). It also peaked the Irish Albums Chart for five weeks.

In the UK, the album was released on November 5, 1984.

== Background ==
Over a year after their first album, New Edition were a million-selling pop act by the time of this release. They had also gone through a nasty court battle with their former mentor and producer Maurice Starr. Around the time of the making of this album, the group and Starr argued over monetary earnings that the group felt that had been taken away by Starr, who has to this day steadfastly denied taking the boys' earnings from them. The dispute came after the group members received their checks in their mailboxes only to discover that they were only given $1.87 despite the success of their debut album, Candy Girl and their accompanying US tour. Angered, New Edition filed a lawsuit against Starr and demanded out of their contract. Starr relented and gave the boys the freedom to leave. The bitter split eventually led to Starr's creating "the white New Edition": New Kids on the Block. Meanwhile, the boys left Starr's label, the independent Streetwise Records in February 1984 and signed a new contract through Jump & Shoot Productions with MCA. Being given a bevy of producers including R&B mainstay Ray Parker Jr. and writer-producer Mike Sembello of "Maniac" fame among them, the group released their self-titled second album in the early fall of 1984 to huge success.

== Release and response ==
Thanks to more thorough promotion and music tailored for more of a mainstream audience, New Edition won new fans upon the release of this album. The first two singles, "Cool It Now" and "Mr. Telephone Man", both became top twenty pop hits and reached number one on the R&B singles chart. The album peaked at number six on the Billboard pop albums chart and number one on the R&B albums chart. It later spawned the top forty pop hit with the ballad "Lost in Love" and the uptempo top forty R&B single, "My Secret (Didja Gitit Yet?)". The album was certified double platinum. This album was also promoted under a more clean-cut pop image for the group, much different from the streetwise persona they had during their first album, a marketing decision that various group members would later admit that they weren't thrilled about at the time.

"Kinda Girls We Like" fuses rap verses by each members and singing vocal harmonies on the chorus, a synthesizer instrumental break and ends with a rock guitar solo. The single reached #87 on the US Billboard Hot Black Singles. It was performed on Soul Train Season 14 : Episode 16 that aired January 26, 1985. During their late 1984 and 1985 concert tour, the song served as a set opener.

== Track listing ==
No.	Title	Writer(s)	Producer(s)	Length
1.	"Cool It Now"	Vincent Brantley, Rick Timas	Brantley, Timas	5:47
2.	"Mr. Telephone Man"	Ray Parker Jr.	Parker, Jr.	3:58
3.	"I'm Leaving You Again"	Ricky Bell, Ralph Tresvant	Brantley, Timas	4:15
4.	"Baby Love"	Danny Sembello, Michael Sembello, Richard Rudolph	Rudolph, M. Sembello	4:36
5.	"Delicious"	D. Sembello, David Batteau	Rudolph, M. Sembello	4:32
6.	"My Secret (Didja Gitit Yet?)"	Dick Eastman, Bobby Hart	Brantley, Hart, Timas	4:09
7.	"Hide and Seek"	Gary Bell, Anne Dudley	Brantley, Timas	3:45
8.	"Lost in Love"	Russell Kramer	Rudolph, M. Sembello	4:12
9.	"Kind of Girls We Like"	New Edition	Richard James Burgess	5:28
10.	"Maryann"	Teena Marie, Rick Chudacoff, Steve Goodman, Arno Lucas	Peter Bunetta, Chudacoff	3:36

B-side
No.	Title	Writer(s)	Producer(s)	Length
1.	"Gold Mine" (B-side to "Lost in Love")	New Edition	Rudolph, M. Sembello	3:02

== Personnel ==
New Edition

- Ronnie DeVoe - background vocals; rap
- Bobby Brown - lead and background vocals, rap
- Ricky Bell - lead and background vocals, rap
- Michael Bivins - background vocals; rap
- Ralph Tresvant - lead, background vocals, rap

Additional musicians

- Vincent Brantley - keyboards
- Rick Timas - bass, guitar, drums
- Ray Parker Jr. - bass, guitar, drums, synthesizer
- Jack Ashford - tambourine
- Sylvester Rivers - electric piano
- Sonny Burke - piano
- Michael Sembello - LinnDrum, guitar
- Danny Sembello - bass, Fender Rhodes, drum programming
- Carlos Vega - Simmons drums
- Bobby Caldwell - guitar
- Randy Waldman - synthesizers, keyboards
- Richard James Burgess - programming
- Don Freeman - keyboards
- Bill Elliott - synthesizers, keyboards
- Brian Ray - guitar
- Charles Fearing - guitar
- Rick Chudacoff - bass, keyboards
- Peter Bunetta - drums, percussion
- Joe Lala - percussion
- Jerry Peterson - saxophone
- Arno Lucas - percussion
- Brad Buxer - synthesizers

== Charts ==
Chart (1984–85)	Peak position
Canadian Albums (RPM)	55
Irish Albums Chart	1
New Zealand Albums (RIANZ)	15
U.S. Billboard 200	6
U.S. Billboard Top R&B Albums	1

=== Singles ===
"My Secret (Didja Gitit Yet?)"
Chart (1985)	Peak position
U.S. Billboard Hot Black Singles	27

"Lost in Love"
Chart (1985)	Peak position
U.S. Billboard Hot 100	35
U.S. Billboard Hot Black Singles	6

== Certifications ==
Region	Certification	Certified units/sales
United States (RIAA)	2× Platinum	2,000,000^{^}
^{^} Shipments figures based on certification alone.
