= Home Again (New Edition album) =

1996 album by New Edition

Studio album by New Edition
- Released: September 10, 1996
- Recorded: 1996
- Genre: R&B, hip-hop, soul
- Length: 61:11
- Label: MCA
- Producer: Sean "Puffy" Combs, Jermaine Dupri, Silky, Carl-So-Lowe, Gerald Levert, Chucky Thompson, Jimmy Jam & Terry Lewis

New Edition chronology
Heart Break (1988)	Home Again (1996)	One Love (2004)

Singles from Home Again
- 1. "Hit Me Off" Released: August 2, 1996; 2. "I'm Still in Love with You" Released: October 22, 1996; 3. "You Don't Have to Worry" Released: October 22, 1996; 4. "Something About You" Released: December 20, 1996; 5. "One More Day" Released: May 20, 1997

Professional ratings
Review scores
Source	Rating
AllMusic	link
Billboard	(favorable)
Cash Box	(favorable)

Home Again is the sixth studio album by American R&B/pop group New Edition. Released on September 10, 1996, it is the only album to date to feature all six members of New Edition—Bobby Brown, who had left the group in 1985, rejoined the lineup—and was their final recording for MCA Records. Highly anticipated, and being their first album since Heart Break (1988), the album debuted on the US Billboard 200 at number one, becoming the group's first album to open at number one, selling 227,000 in its first week sales. It also topped the Irish Albums Chart, and the US Billboard R&B Albums Chart as the group's first album in twelve years to do so since their self titled album in 1984. The album's success spawned four singles that collectively received moderate Billboard chart success. It was certified double platinum by the RIAA, for sales and shipments of over two million copies on February 4, 1997.

== Overview ==
=== History ===
After the successful 1988 album, Heart Break, the lineup of New Edition: Ralph Tresvant, Johnny Gill, Ricky Bell, Ronnie DeVoe, and Michael Bivins decided to go on hiatus as a group in order to pursue separate interests. With the exception of a surprise reunion of all six New Edition members performing at the MTV Video Music Awards in 1990, and song and music video for Bell Biv DeVoe's 1991 single "Word to the Mutha!" (which featured Brown, Gill, and Tresvant), the group largely went their separate ways for the first half of the 1990s.

Upon the advice of producers Jimmy Jam & Terry Lewis, Bell, Bivins and DeVoe formed their own trio, Bell Biv DeVoe. Their album Poison, released in 1990, sold over three million copies. The same year, Johnny Gill—who had had a solo career before joining New Edition—revived it with his multi-platinum self-titled album. Also in 1990, Ralph Tresvant released his long-awaited solo debut album, which too went multi-platinum. In the mix, Bobby Brown, whose 1988 album, Don't Be Cruel, had sold over eight million copies, continued his success with the triple-platinum Bobby album in 1992. By this point, the group members were becoming as known for their side projects as they were as New Edition. Though when pressed by fans and journalists, the now fragmented band mates intermittently assured that they had planned to reunite to record another New Edition album, years passed before such plans were put into action, leaving their fans to wonder if their 1988 album, Heart Break, was in fact the group's swan song.

However, by 1995, many of New Edition's subsequent solo projects were not as successful as their first ventures. Meanwhile, the year had been notable for Bobby Brown—who'd gained more media attention not for his music, but for his tumultuous marriage to Whitney Houston, and various troubles with the law. The same year, Bell, Bivins, DeVoe, Gill, and Tresvant decided to come together and begin production on the long-awaited, long-promised sixth New Edition album. Despite his notorious reputation and worldwide tabloid fodder, the group invited Brown (who had not been featured on a New Edition album since 1985's All for Love) back to join them, to which he agreed.

=== Release and reaction ===
New Edition's first new album in eight years, Home Again, was released in September 1996—debuting at number one on both the Billboard Top 200 and the Top R&B/Hip-Hop album chart. The first single, "Hit Me Off", peaked at number one on the R&B chart and reached number three on the pop chart. Another top ten hit, "I'm Still in Love With You" was released toward years end. Other hits include: "You Don't Have to Worry" and "One More Day". Another song "Shop Around" was not released as a single, but still found moderate airplay on R&B stations. Home Again went on to be certified double platinum, with sales of over two million, and became the group's greatest commercial success. In the UK, the album peaked at number 22 on the Albums Chart and spawned two top 20 singles in "Hit Me Off" and "Something About You". The group originally recorded twenty songs for the project.

However, their reunion tour was tainted by some of the members' egos. One evening as Brown extended his solo set, Ronnie DeVoe attempted to pull Brown off the stage. Eventually, Brown responded by dropping his microphone and a fist fight between the two ensued. This led to both members' security guards confronting each other, gun play was brought in, and the concert was halted. Bivins and Brown left the tour early, while DeVoe, Bell, Gill and Tresvant finished out the rest of the tour as a quartet. Brown later admitted during an interview that he was intoxicated during the tour.

In the UK the album was released on September 2, 1996.

== Track listing ==
No.	Title	Writer(s)	Producer(s)	Length
1.	"Oh, Yeah, It Feels So Good"	James Harris III; Terry Lewis; Ronnie DeVoe; Ricky Bell; James Brown; Fred Wesley; John Starks	Jimmy Jam & Terry Lewis	6:02
2.	"Hit Me Off"	Silky; Dinky Bingham; Jeff Dyson; DeVoe; Michael Bivins; Kenyatta Blake; Walter Dewgarde	Silky	4:21
3.	"You Don't Have to Worry"	Sean "Puffy" Combs; Chucky Thompson; Heavy D; Quinnes Parker; Daron Jones; Marvin Scandrick; Michael Keith; Brown	Combs; Thompson	4:42
4.	"Tighten It Up"	Jermaine Dupri; Carl So-Lowe; Bell; DeVoe; Dougie Dee	Dupri; So-Lowe^{[a]}	4:00
5.	"Shop Around"	Dupri; So-Lowe; Johnny Gill; Ralph Tresvant; Bivins	Dupri; So-Lowe^{[a]}	3:25
6.	"Hear Me Out"	Bingham; Geo Washington; Bivins	Bingham	5:12
7.	"Something About You"	Harris III; Lewis; Edie Brickell; Kenneth Withrow; Brad Houser; Alan Aly; John Bush	Jimmy Jam & Terry Lewis	4:48
8.	"Try Again"	Combs; Thompson; Harvey Frierson; Eric Sadler; Hank Shocklee; Ricky Walters	Combs; Thompson	4:24
9.	"How Do You Like Your Love Served"	Gerald Levert; Edwin Nicholas	Levert; Nicholas	5:32
10.	"One More Day"	Harris III; Lewis	Jimmy Jam & Terry Lewis	5:03
11.	"I'm Still In Love With You"	Harris III; Lewis	Jimmy Jam & Terry Lewis	4:39
12.	"Thank You (The J.G. Interlude)"	Gill	Gill	2:39
13.	"Home Again"	Harris III; Lewis; Bivins	Jimmy Jam & Terry Lewis	6:24

Notes

- ^a signifies a co-producer
- "Oh, Yeah, It Feels So Good" contains a sample from "The Payback" by James Brown.
- "Hit Me Off" contains a sample from "I Got Cha Opin" by Black Moon, and from "Storm King" by Bob James.
- "You Don't Have to Worry" contains a sample from "Your Love" by James Brown.
- "Tighten It Up" contains a sample from "Slow Down" by Loose Ends, and from "Westchester Lady" by Bob James.
- "Something About You" contains a sample from "What I Am" by Edie Brickell & New Bohemians.
- "Try Again" contains a sample from "Lick the Balls" by Slick Rick.
- "One More Day" contains a sample from "Sunny Monday" by Booker T. & the M.G.'s.

== Personnel ==
- Ricky Bell: vocals
- Michael Bivins: vocals
- Ronnie DeVoe: vocals
- Bobby Brown: vocals
- Johnny Gill: vocals, acoustic guitar, producer, engineer, mixing
- Ralph Tresvant: vocals
- New Edition and Brooke Payne: executive producers

== Charts ==
=== Weekly charts ===
Chart (1996)	Peak position
Australian Albums (ARIA)	13
Canadian Albums (RPM)	1
Dutch Albums (Album Top 100)	46
French Albums (SNEP)	40
German Albums (Offizielle Top 100)	63
New Zealand Albums (RMNZ)	11
Swedish Albums (Sverigetopplistan)	43
UK Albums (Official Charts)	22
US Billboard 200	1
US Top R&B/Hip-Hop Albums (Billboard)	1

=== Year-end charts ===
Chart (1996)	Position
US Billboard 200	67
US Top R&B/Hip-Hop Albums (Billboard)	21

Chart (1997)	Position
US Billboard 200	73
US Top R&B/Hip-Hop Albums (Billboard)	48

== Certifications ==
Region	Certification	Certified units/sales
Canada (Music Canada)	Platinum	100,000^{^}
United States (RIAA)	2× Platinum	2,000,000^{^}
^{^} Shipments figures based on certification alone.

== See also ==
- List of Billboard 200 number-one albums of 1996
- List of Billboard number-one R&B albums of 1996
