= New Edition =

American R&B group

- New Edition in 2026; From left: Gill, DeVoe, Brown, Tresvant, Bivins. Not pictured: Bell

Background information
- Also known as: RBRM; N.E.
- Origin: Boston, Massachusetts, U.S.
- Genres: R&B; pop; hip-hop; new jack swing
- Works: New Edition discography
- Years active: 1978–1990; 1996–1997; 2002–present
- Labels: Streetwise; MCA; Bad Boy; Geffen
- Spinoffs: Bell Biv DeVoe; Heads of State
- Members: Ricky Bell; Michael Bivins; Ronnie DeVoe; Bobby Brown; Johnny Gill; Ralph Tresvant

New Edition is an American R&B/pop group from the Roxbury neighborhood of Boston, Massachusetts, formed in 1978. Their name is taken to mean a new edition of the Jackson 5. The group reached its height of popularity in the 1980s and is considered the blueprint for what would become the modern boy band. The lineup originally consisted of Ricky Bell, Michael Bivins, Ronnie DeVoe, Bobby Brown, and Ralph Tresvant. Brown departed the group in late 1985 to begin a successful solo career, and they continued as a quartet for one album, before adding Johnny Gill to the lineup in 1987. Early hits included "Candy Girl", "Cool It Now", and "Mr. Telephone Man". Tresvant was the lead singer on most of the songs. In 1990, both Gill and Tresvant released their own solo albums, while the remaining three members formed the trio Bell Biv DeVoe; the group ceased to work together for the first half of the 1990s.

All six members of New Edition reunited in 1996 to record the group's sixth studio album Home Again. During the ill-fated Home Again Tour, both Brown and Bivins quit the group, forcing the remainder of the tour to be canceled. Various reunions have occurred since, usually with the 1987–1990 lineup, though occasionally also including Brown. Their last studio album was 2004's One Love.

On May 3, 2011, New Edition issued a press release on their official website announcing that all six members were reuniting as New Edition to kick off the 30th anniversary celebration of Candy Girl with their fans. They received their star on the Hollywood Walk of Fame on January 23, 2017. On January 24, 2017, a three-part docuseries, The New Edition Story, premiered on BET about the group's career and personal life. It was later announced that all six members will reunite to record another album and go on tour. On February 17, 2022, the group was inducted into the Black Music & Entertainment Walk of Fame.

On December 31, 2022, New Edition performed on Dick Clark's New Year's Rocking Eve with Ryan Seacrest. All six members were in attendance and performed various songs from both their group and solo careers. On September 24, 2023, in Farmington Hills, Michigan, New Edition was inducted into the National Rhythm & Blues Hall of Fame. In 2026, the group was nominated for the Rock and Roll Hall of Fame.

== Career ==
=== 1978–1985: Rise to stardom ===
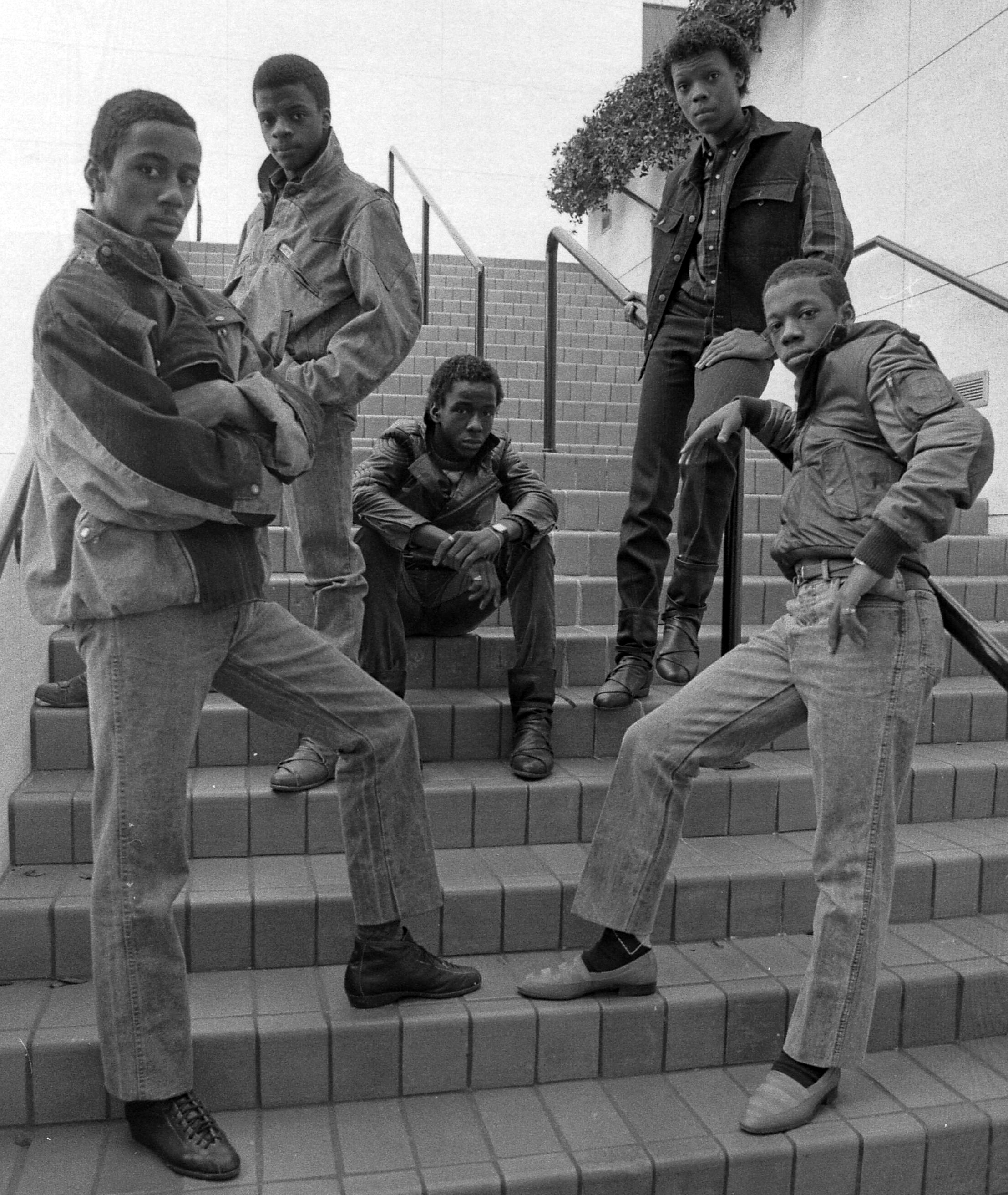
New Edition in 1985.

The group was formed by Bobby Brown and his childhood friends in the Orchard Park Projects of Roxbury, Boston. The group then scored its big break in 1982, performing at the local Hollywood Talent Night held at Boston's Strand Theatre by singer/producer Maurice Starr. The first prize was $500 and a recording contract. Although the group came in second place, an impressed Starr decided to bring the group to his studio the following day to record what would become their debut album, Candy Girl. Released on July 19, 1983 on New York producer Arthur Baker's Levi Belt Streetwise Records, the album featured the hits: "Is This the End", "Popcorn Love", and the title track "Candy Girl," which went to number one on both the American R&B singles chart and the UK singles chart.

Returning from their first major concert tour, the boys were dropped off by the tour bus back at their homes in the projects and were given a check in the amount of $1.87 for their efforts. Tour budget and expenses were given as the explanation as to why they were not paid more. Due to these financial reasons, New Edition parted with Starr in 1984. Starr responded by promptly creating the group New Kids on the Block, essentially formatted after New Edition, but with white teenagers. Meanwhile, the group employed the law firm of Steven and Martin Machat and sued Streetwise for release from a contract that was unenforceable as well as materially breached by Streetwise. The Machats won the legal game and then secured the group a bigger recording deal with major label MCA Records, which won the bidding war among various other major labels. In need of management, the group signed with Steven Machat and his two management partners Rick Smith and Bill Dern. The management company, AMI, proceeded to escalate the group's profile in both the urban and pop music worlds. Through the production affiliate of AMI, Jump and Shoot, MCA released the group's self-titled second album the same year. Eclipsing their debut album, New Edition spun off the top five hit "Cool It Now" and the top twenty "Mr. Telephone Man", and went on to be certified double platinum in the United States.

While promoting their second album, the group was dismayed to realize that they were not actually signed to MCA Records, but instead with the production company Jump and Shoot, which had its own deal with MCA; subsequently, all business matters pertaining to the group were controlled by the former. To buy themselves out of the stifling production deal, each of the five members borrowed $100,000 from MCA. Though it effectively separated the group from Jump and Shoot and allowed them to sign a new long-term contract to record for MCA directly, they were now in mortgage to the label. As a result, the group would be forced to continually record and tour during this period in order to pay off its debt.

New Edition's third album, All for Love, was released in the latter half of 1985. While not duplicating the success of its predecessor, the album was certified platinum and spawned the hits "Count Me Out", "A Little Bit of Love (Is All It Takes)", and "With You All the Way". The growing popularity of the group led to a guest appearance (as themselves) in the 1985 film Krush Groove, performing "My Secret". Toward the year's end, Christmas All Over the World, a holiday EP, was released as well as an oldies album of tunes from the '50s sung by the group with an '80s production style.

=== 1985–1989: Bobby Brown's departure, Johnny Gill's introduction and Heart Break ===
Bobby Brown embarked on a solo career in 1986, while New Edition continued to promote All for Love as a quartet. In spite of their financial and internal conflicts, New Edition continued to peak. During this era of the group's evolution, the group appeared in the episode of Knight Rider titled "Knight Song", performing "Count Me Out". As 1986 wound to a close, they recorded a cover of The Penguins' 1954 hit "Earth Angel" for the soundtrack to The Karate Kid, Part II. The song peaked at number twenty-one and inspired the group to record Under the Blue Moon, an album of doo-wop covers.

After having already lost a member when Brown departed the group, New Edition's future became uncertain when murmurings began to surface that Tresvant was eyeing a solo career as well. To pad his potential departure, singer Johnny Gill was voted into the group by Ricky Bell, Michael Bivins and Ronnie DeVoe in 1987, despite Tresvant ultimately deciding to remain in place. A native of Washington, D.C., Gill is the only non-Boston native among the group's six members.

New Edition's fifth studio release, Heart Break, was released in the summer of 1988. Primarily produced by the production team of Jimmy Jam & Terry Lewis, the album was a departure from the group's previous bubblegum sound, and instead took on a smoother, stronger, and more adult resonance. Spinning off five hit singles: "If It Isn't Love", "You're Not My Kind of Girl", "Can You Stand the Rain", "Crucial" and "N.E. Heartbreak"; Heart Break became New Edition's most commercially successful album up to that point, certified double platinum in the United States. The success of Heart Break would launch the group on a successful concert tour as well in the closing months of 1988, with N.E. serving as the headliners while Al B. Sure and former member Bobby Brown served as the opening acts.

=== 1990–1995: Solo projects ===
Inspired by the substantial success Brown was having with his multi-platinum 1988 breakthrough album Don't Be Cruel, after the run of Heart Break, New Edition went on hiatus to pursue side projects away from the group. At the suggestion of producers Jimmy Jam and Terry Lewis, Bell, Bivins and DeVoe formed a trio, Bell Biv DeVoe. Their 1990 debut album, Poison, went quadruple platinum. The same year, Tresvant and Gill (who had already recorded as a solo act prior to joining New Edition) released self-titled solo albums, which also achieved multi-platinum success. Later that year, the group, including Brown, had a semi-reunion of sorts when they performed at the 1990 MTV Video Music Awards. In 1991, all six members again reunited to record a remix of the Bell Biv DeVoe track "Word to the Mutha!"; Brown, Gill and Tresvant also appeared in the music video. Prior to this, Brown also appeared in the music videos for Bell Biv DeVoe's "BBD (I Thought It Was Me)" video, as well as Tresvant's "Stone Cold Gentleman" and "Sensitivity" remix videos.

=== 1996–1997: Home Again reunion and hiatus ===
By 1996, the members of New Edition had arguably achieved greater commercial success with their own side projects than the group had during its run. However, after having promised fans that there would be a reunion — and still contractually owing MCA Records another New Edition album — the group, with Brown, reunited to record Home Again, their first new album in eight years. The album debuted at number one on both the Billboard 200 and R&B Albums chart, and became the most commercially successful album of the group's career; reaching double platinum status in the United States. It also produced several hits, including the top ten pop hits: "Hit Me Off" and "I'm Still in Love with You." However, the ensuing 1997 Home Again Tour would prove disastrous for the group. Despite not having toured together in close to a decade (and over ten years for Brown), old rivalries and struggles for on stage dominance resurfaced as if no time had passed. By the middle leg of the tour, one evening at a concert in Las Cruces, New Mexico as Brown was extending his solo set, DeVoe attempted to pull Brown off the stage. Brown responded by dropping his microphone and a fist fight between the two ensued. This led to both members' security guards confronting each other, gun play was brought in, and the concert was halted. Bivins and Brown left the tour early, while DeVoe, Bell, Gill, and Tresvant finished out the rest of the tour as a quartet. Brown later admitted during an interview that he was intoxicated during the tour. Each of the group members again went their separate ways, this time on more hostile terms than ever; resulting in an indefinite hiatus that appeared to be the swan song for New Edition.

Also in 1996, the three solo members of New Edition (Brown, Gill and Tresvant) joined Monica and Faith Evans to collaborate with Brown's then-wife Whitney Houston on a recording of the gospel standard "Somebody Bigger Than You and I" that appeared on the soundtrack to Houston's movie The Preacher's Wife. They had also made an appearance on Family Matters season 8 episode 9 titled "Home Again."

The following year, Gill formed the R&B supergroup LSG, along with Gerald Levert and Keith Sweat, to release the album Levert.Sweat.Gill, which had the hit single "My Body".

=== 2002–2004: Return to the spotlight and New Edition under Bad Boy ===
After their second wave of solo pursuits proved less than successful, New Edition reunited once more as a five-piece without Brown and began touring clubs, casinos, and small arenas in 2002; including appearing on The Tom Joyner Sky Show. After having caught the attention of rapper/producer Sean Combs, who was present at one of their shows, he signed the group to his Bad Boy Records label, after their long-term contract with MCA Records finally ended.

In the fall of 2004, New Edition's seventh studio album and Bad Boy debut, One Love, was released. Though the album debuted at number twelve on the Billboard 200, it had a steady descent from the chart. The lead-off single, "Hot 2Nite", underperformed; peaking at number thirty-five and number eighty-seven on the R&B and Pop singles charts, respectively. During production of the album, the group disagreed with Combs on its creative direction. In an interview, Bell revealed that Combs' had refused to pay New Edition's long time producers Jimmy Jam and Terry Lewis for a track that the group wanted on the album. Reportedly, Combs told the group they were over budget, despite their having used many of Bad Boy's in-house team of writers and producers on the album. Ultimately, the group asked to be released from their Bad Boy contract. Despite the messy divorce with Bad Boy, New Edition soldiered on and continued to tour.

=== 2005–present ===
In 2005, New Edition appeared on an episode of the UPN reality competition series R U the Girl as part of an elimination challenge, assisting the remaining TLC members Tionne "T-Boz" Watkins and Rozonda "Chilli" Thomas in judging the show's remaining finalists as they put together group performances opening up for a New Edition live concert. During the making of the episode, Thomas and Watkins discussed with New Edition how Bivins had inspired late member Lisa Lopes' nickname "Left Eye" in TLC's early beginnings. In the fall of 2005, New Edition performed a medley of hits at BET's 25th Anniversary Special. During their set, they brought Brown out onstage for an impromptu rendition of their 1985 hit "Mr. Telephone Man". Brown also performed a rendition of "My Prerogative" with DeVoe and Tresvant as dancers. It was later announced on BET and Access Hollywood that Brown had reconciled with 'New Edition and planned to rejoin the group for its future concert dates and studio albums.

On August 26, 2006, New Edition filmed a concert at the University of South Carolina's Koger Center in Columbia set for a future DVD release, the concert was billed as "Spend the Night with New Edition", a BET special presented by Lincoln with whom the group has advertised. Brown also made an appearance at the show.

In 2008, the group, minus Brown, recorded a new song with New Kids on the Block called "Full Service" for their latest album, The Block. Meanwhile, Brown, Tresvant and Gill formed a new side group called Heads of State, which performed at their 2 year 2 month tour called the Summit Tour which was held from November 2008 to January 2011. According to Gill, their group name was inspired by the original name for The Rat Pack, called "The Summit" or "The Heads of State".

On June 28, 2009, the group performed a medley of Jackson 5 hits in tribute to Michael Jackson on the BET Awards. Led by Tresvant, Brown and Bell, New Edition sang and danced through classics such as "I Want You Back", "ABC" and "The Love You Save". Later that year, Bell and Gill joined New Kids on the Block onstage at a House of Blues benefit show for Toys for Tots in Boston, performing "Full Service" and "This One's for the Children".

Gill later confirmed that New Edition had signed with manager Irving Azoff, that they are currently signed with Geffen Records (which absorbed the group's old label, MCA, and controls the group's back catalog) and was slating to release a comeback album.

On July 3, 2011, in New Orleans, Louisiana, all six members of New Edition reunited at the Essence Music Festival to kick off and celebrate their 30th anniversary tour. "This is just the beginning. We're preparing for a world tour and many other exciting things that we'll be announcing soon. The next chapter of New Edition is going to be an incredible celebration to thank our fans for all of their support over the last 30 years," said Bell speaking on behalf of the group.

In February 2012, Brown missed a handful of dates due to the death of ex-wife Whitney Houston. On March 9 and 11, 2012, Brown and Bell Biv DeVoe made their African debut by performing in Nigeria. From late 2011 to early 2012, New Edition went on a tour called #AllSix across the United States.

In late 2012, New Edition received the Lifetime Achievement Award during the Soul Train Awards ceremony. All six members appeared together onstage that evening.

In August 2015, BET announced a three-episode miniseries about the group would be made for release in January 2017. All six members were co-producers of The New Edition Story. Jesse Collins Entertainment was the executive producer of the original miniseries, which was BET's first scripted music-focused miniseries. The group's original choreographer and longtime manager Brooke Payne also served as a co-producer. On January 24–26, 2017, BET aired the biopic miniseries The New Edition Story which chronicles the band members life from their childhood in Boston into Hollywood fame as adults. It was directed by Chris Robinson and executive produced by Jessie Collins. The group served as co-producers. The miniseries brought in 28.4 million viewers to BET, through the initial run and subsequent encores over the week of the premiere.

In July 2021, New Edition signed with Creative Artists Agency and announced a Las Vegas Residency and an upcoming arena tour.

New Edition performed a medley of their hits alongside New Kids on the Block at the 2021 American Music Awards, marking their first performance at the award show since 1997.

In December 2021, New Edition announced The Culture Tour, presented by the Black Promoters Collective. The 30-city tour began in Columbus, Georgia on Feb. 16, 2022, and ended in Miami, Florida, on April 10, 2022.

In December 2022, New Edition announced that they would keep doing tours for the year of 2023. It was named The Legacy Tour and New Edition will be touring 31 cities across the United States. The tour will also have opening acts such as Keith Sweat, Tank, and the R&B/Hip-Hop group, Guy. New Edition's first concert will begin in Columbia, South Carolina, on March 9, 2023.

On November 6, 2023, New Edition announced a Vegas residency at the Encore at Wynn Las Vegas in early 2024, which will start on February 28 through March 9

In October 2025, New Edition announced The New Edition Way Tour for 2026, which begins January 29 through April 04 and they will be joined by Boyz II Men and Toni Braxton.

== Awards ==
New Edition received two American Music Awards for Favorite Soul/R&B Band/Duo/Group (1987 and 1997). They also received the Soul Train Award in 1989 for Best R&B/Urban Contemporary Album of the Year – Group, Band, or Duo (Heart Break), and again in 1997 for the Best R&B/Soul Album – Group, Band, or Duo (Home Again). In 2012, New Edition received the Soul Train Lifetime Achievement Award. On June 28, 2016, Hollywood Chamber of Commerce and Walk of Famer Vin Di Bona announced New Edition's induction into the Hollywood Walk of Fame in the category of Recording. On January 23, 2017, New Edition received a star on the Hollywood Walk of Fame for their contributions to the music industry, located at 7080 Hollywood Boulevard. In 2017, New Edition received a Lifetime Achievement Award at the 2017 BET Awards. In 2022, the group was inducted into the Black Music & Entertainment Walk of Fame. In 2023, New Edition was inducted into the 12th Class of the National Rhythm & Blues Hall of Fame

== Discography ==
Studio albums

- Candy Girl (1983)
- New Edition (1984)
- All for Love (1985)
- Under the Blue Moon (1986)
- Heart Break (1988)
- Home Again (1996)
- One Love (2004)

== Tours ==
- Candy Girl Tour (1983–1984)
- Fantasy Tour (1984–1985)
- All 4 Love Tour (1986)
- Heartbreak Tour (1988–1989)
- Home Again Tour (1996–1997)
- One Love Tour (2004–2005)
- 30th Anniversary Tour (2011–2012)
- All Six Tour (2014)
- Greatest Hits Tour (2016)
- Culture Tour (2022)
- Legacy Tour (2023)
- The New Edition Way Tour with Boyz II Men and Toni Braxton (2026)

== Band members ==
Official members

- Ricky Bell – tertiary lead vocals, background vocals (first tenor) (1978–present)
- Michael Bivins – rapping, background vocals (low baritone) (1978–present)
- Bobby Brown – secondary lead vocals, background vocals (second tenor) (1978–1985, 1996–1997, 2005–present)
- Ralph Tresvant – primary lead vocals, background vocals (melody) (1978–present)
- Ronnie DeVoe – rapping, background vocals (second tenor) (1982–present)
- Johnny Gill – co-secondary lead vocals, background vocals (high baritone) (1987–present)

=== Spin-offs ===
New Edition went through three separate spinoff groups created throughout their careers with Bell Biv DeVoe being the most notable, popular and successful act. While the other two acts were more formed and promoted as concert collaborations and touring performances respectively.

Spinoff	Members	Year(s)	Notes
Bell Biv DeVoe (BBD)	Ricky Bell; Michael Bivins; Ronnie DeVoe	1990–2001 & 2016–2017 2022 * The Culture Tour (New Edition)	The band's creation was an idea and concept suggested by Ralph Tresvant and Jimmy Jam & Terry Lewis which the band released 2 albums in the 1990s, and a third album in the early 2000s. The band reunited in late 2016 to release their fourth studio album Three Stripes; they also released music videos for the singles "Run" and "I'm Betta"
Heads of State (HOS)	Bobby Brown; Johnny Gill; Ralph Tresvant	2008–2011	The second half of New Edition who made successful strides at solo careers decided to band together to tour and perform alongside each other collectively sharing the stage performing each other's hits. (Most notably, The Summit Tour).
RBRM	Ronnie DeVoe; Bobby Brown; Ricky Bell; Michael Bivins	2017–2019	Formed in late 2017 and created for live tour performances as a result of attempting to reunite the New Edition band after they released their 2017 biopic miniseries The New Edition Story. Disagreements surrounding the New Edition trademark and the group's creative direction resulted in Johnny Gill and Ralph Tresvant leaving the group, with the remaining members continuing to perform under the new moniker "RBRM".
