= Bobby Brown =

American singer (born 1969)

- Brown in 2026
- Born: Robert Barisford Brown; February 5, 1969 (age 57); Boston, Massachusetts, U.S.
- Occupations: Singer; songwriter; rapper; dancer
- Years active: 1978–present
- Television: Being Bobby Brown
- Spouses: Whitney Houston (m. 1992; div. 2007) Alicia Etheredge (m. 2012)
- Children: 7, including Bobbi Kristina
- Awards: Full list
- Musical career
- Genres: R&B; dance; new jack swing; pop
- Labels: MCA; Geffen; Bronx Bridge
- Member of: New Edition; Heads of State

Robert Barisford Brown Sr. (born February 5, 1969) is an American singer, songwriter, rapper, and dancer. Alongside frequent collaborator Teddy Riley, he is recognized as a pioneer of new jack swing: a fusion of hip-hop and R&B. Brown rose to fame as a founding member of the R&B/pop vocal group New Edition, contributing to hits like "Candy Girl", "Cool It Now", and "Mr. Telephone Man". He left the group in 1985 to pursue a solo career but later reunited with them for their Billboard 200 number-one album Home Again (1996).

Brown's debut album, King of Stage (1986), featured the number-one R&B single "Girlfriend". His second album, Don't Be Cruel (1988), brought him commercial and critical success, producing five Billboard Hot 100 top 10 singles, including the number-one hit "My Prerogative" and the Grammy Award–winning "Every Little Step". In 1989, Brown contributed two songs to the Ghostbusters II soundtrack. His next album, Bobby (1992), was certified 3× Platinum by the RIAA and featured the singles "Humpin' Around", "Get Away", and "Good Enough". Brown has also appeared in films, including A Thin Line Between Love and Hate (1996) and Two Can Play That Game (2001).

In 1992, Brown married Whitney Houston, with whom he had daughter Bobbi Kristina Brown. Their widely-publicized relationship was marked by drug issues and domestic disputes, attracting significant media attention. Brown and Houston starred in the 2005 reality television series Being Bobby Brown. Houston filed for divorce in 2006, and it was finalized a year later in 2007.

== Early life ==
Brown was born in Boston, Massachusetts, as one of eight children. His mother Carole Elizabeth (born Williams) was a teacher, and his father Herbert James Brown was a construction worker. Brown grew up in Roxbury's Orchard Park Projects.

As a child, Brown was molested by a Catholic priest after being placed in temporary custody by social services and said this painful encounter contributed to his struggle with drug and alcohol abuse. He later said, “It’s been more than thirty years, but I can never let go of the horror I felt in that room with the priest.”

Brown was three when he had his first taste of performing on stage, as one of his childhood idols, James Brown, performed in Boston. This performance sparked his dream of becoming a professional singer. Brown joined the church choir, where he recognized and developed his singing abilities. Brown's musical influences also include singer-songwriters Rick James, Michael Jackson, Marvin Gaye, and Prince. Brown is reportedly a distant cousin of disco artist Donna Summer and her family, who lived in the multiracial Mission Hill neighborhood in the 1950s and 1960s.

== Music career ==
=== New Edition ===
New Edition was founded in 1980 under the name "The Bricks" by 12-year-old Brown and childhood friends Michael Bivins and Ricky Bell. Ralph Tresvant joined the group at the suggestion of Bell who sang with Tresvant as a duo. Brown was also familiar with Tresvant since they were children. In 1982 they became a quintet when their manager Brooke Payne insisted on bringing in his nephew Ronnie DeVoe, to complete the group. After performing in several talent shows in the Boston area, they signed a deal with fellow Bostonian Arthur Baker's Streetwise Records, who released their debut album Candy Girl. The title track, on which Brown sang co-lead alongside Bell and Tresvant, was the group's first number-one hit on Billboard's R&B Singles Chart in 1983 and also became an international hit, reaching number one in the United Kingdom and New Zealand. Brown's first full lead vocal performance was on the New Edition ballad "Jealous Girl", which was a minor hit when it also charted in 1983. The group became crossover pop sensations with their self-titled second release in 1984. The album included the pop hits "Cool It Now" and "Mr. Telephone Man", the latter in which Brown also co-led, often singing the now-memorable chorus.

Despite the group's success, Brown felt the group was never rightfully paid the money they felt they had earned, later saying, "The most I saw from all the tours and all of the records we sold was $500 and a VCR." Brown also allegedly grew jealous of the attention given to fellow New Edition member Ralph Tresvant, and during some of their tour performances would often step out of his position and perform out of turn, singing and performing seductively, which caused concern within the group's management team. Brown was featured on two more New Edition albums before leaving the group in early 1986. Brown later said he felt that the group's management treated them "like little slaves by people who were only interested in money and power, and not in the welfare of New Edition". Some controversy arose over the way Brown was removed from the group. Some say Brown asked to be let out of New Edition, but a VH-1 Behind the Music documentary on the group claimed Brown was voted out by the group via their management team, with the members—most prominently Tresvant—against the decision.

=== Solo career ===
Following his exit from New Edition, Brown signed a contract with his former group's label, MCA (which had earlier promised Brown a solo deal if he had decided to leave New Edition), and also signed with manager Steven Machat, who had also worked with New Edition. The label released his debut album King of Stage in 1986. Brown had a number-one R&B hit with the ballad "Girlfriend", but the album otherwise failed to perform well.

Brown lay low for more than a year while working on his follow-up album. With the help of Machat and MCA representative Louil Silas, Brown began working with some of the top R&B producers and songwriters of the time, including Babyface, Antonio "L.A." Reid and Teddy Riley. The producers helped to compose what became Brown's most successful solo album of his career, Don't Be Cruel. Released in 1988, the album became Brown's first number-one album on the Billboard 200 on January 21, 1989, replacing fellow R&B singer Anita Baker's Giving You the Best That I Got at the top spot. 19 years old at the time of this accomplishment, Brown became the youngest male artist to top the Billboard 200 since Stevie Wonder's 1963 live album, Recorded Live: The 12 Year Old Genius, which reached the top spot when Wonder was thirteen. At the time, Brown became the youngest male artist in history to top the album charts with a studio album. Singer Justin Bieber later broke that record in 2010.

The album launched five top-ten hits on the Billboard Hot 100, including the number-one single, the self-penned "My Prerogative", which became, along with "Every Little Step" and the title track, signature hits for the performer. Album sales would eventually reach twelve million copies worldwide, including 7 million alone in the US, making it the best-selling album of 1989. In February 1990, he won the Grammy Award for Best Male R&B Vocal Performance for the album's fourth single "Every Little Step". Don't Be Cruel also garnered Brown two American Music Awards, a Soul Train Music Award and a People's Choice Award.

In 1989, Brown contributed two songs to the soundtrack of Ghostbusters II, and he also had a cameo role in the film. The first track on that album, "On Our Own" became another top-ten single for the singer, peaking at number two. The same year, a remix compilation, Dance!...Ya Know It!, was released, and found fans in the United Kingdom. Brown embarked on a 120-day world tour to promote Don't Be Cruel in 1988, with Al B. Sure! opening for him, and New Edition also opening for him on some dates. The tour lasted into the spring of 1991, but not without Brown gaining notoriety for simulating sexual acts onstage, which got him into trouble with local law enforcement. In 1990, Brown performed "Tap into My Heart" at the 1990 MTV Awards, and was set to release the album Mystical Magic, but it was eventually shelved for reasons unknown. In 1990, Brown was featured on the number-one hit "She Ain't Worth It" by Glenn Medeiros, making it his second number-one hit on the pop chart, and also collaborated with Babyface for the remix of the latter's single "Tender Lover" that same year. In 1991, Brown collaborated with New Edition member Ralph Tresvant on the latter's single "Stone Cold Gentleman", which was a top-five R&B hit.

Brown's next album Bobby was released in 1992. Despite its release during the final days of the new jack swing era it was a success, selling more than 3 million copies, and spawning several hit singles including "Humpin' Around", "Get Away", and "Good Enough". He received his second Grammy Award for Best Male R&B Vocal Performance nomination for "Humpin' Around". He received his third American Music Award in January 1993. However, sales of Bobby did not match its predecessor. The song "Something in Common", a duet between Brown and then-newlywed wife Whitney Houston, in which they shared songwriting credit while Houston was credited with vocal arrangement, became a hit in the UK, peaking at No. 16. Despite the fact that the song did not receive a commercial single in the United States, the song became a hit on the Billboard pop and R&B radio airplay charts.

In 1994, dance producers K-Klass remixed "Two Can Play That Game" from the Bobby album, which would become Brown's biggest single in the UK, peaking at No. 3 in 1995.

He released his fourth solo album, Forever, in 1997. The album's only single, "Feeling Inside", was not successful. Brown would contribute to wife Whitney Houston's 2002 album, Just Whitney, co-producing the moderately successful hit, "Whatchulookinat", while contributing vocals to their duet, "My Love", off the same album. The latter duet reached the top 40 of the Billboard Adult R&B Songs chart. Just Whitney was a hit, going platinum in the United States and selling over 2.5 million units worldwide.

Prior to the release of Forever, Brown had been in negotiations with rapper Tupac Shakur to sign with Shakur's new label Makaveli Records, or with the proposed label Death Row East. However, Shakur died before that could take place. Leaving MCA following Forever, Brown lay low for several years, appearing as a featured artist in 2001 on two tracks from The Benzino Project, and in 2002 he was featured in a duet with rapper Ja Rule on the song "Thug Lovin'". Brown was signed to Murder Inc. Records, but that label had already begun to dissolve, so Brown's tenure with them was brief. In 2006, Brown added vocals to Damian Marley's song "Beautiful" on Marley's album, Welcome to Jamrock.

In 2008, Brown planned to release a book titled Bobby Brown: The Truth, the Whole Truth and Nothing But, written by author Derrick Handspike. When controversial comments that Brown made about his ex-wife, Whitney Houston, were leaked to the media, he backed out of the project. Handspike released the book after Houston's death in 2012.

In 2010, Brown was featured in a duet with singer Macy Gray on the song "Real Love" on Gray's album The Sellout. About this project, Gray explained to Essence, "Actually, he came to the studio, since he doesn't live far, and knocked out his recording in two hours. We're friends, and his one-year-old son is my godson. His fiancée is one of my best friends in the whole world. I met Bobby a long time ago, but we really got to know each other through her."

On June 5, 2012, Brown released his fifth album, The Masterpiece, which debuted at number 41 on the Billboard R&B album chart.

On February 14, 2017, Brown performed at the Valentine's Day Music Festival with Keith Sweat, Avant and El DeBarge.

=== New Edition reunions ===
Brown made his first reunited appearance with New Edition at the 1990 MTV Video Music Awards. Their performance later sparked the recording of Bell Biv DeVoe's "Word to the Mutha!" in 1991 (on which Brown, Ralph Tresvant and later NE member Johnny Gill were included). A fully-fledged reunion occurred with the 1996 release of the album, Home Again. Brown contributed lead vocals on two hit singles, "Hit Me Off" and "You Don't Have to Worry". However, a subsequent 1997 tour to support the album led to problems between Brown and the other New Edition members. Brown later admitted that he was struggling with drug addiction and alcoholism during the tour.

In 2005, at the BET 25th Anniversary Special, Brown again reunited with New Edition. In 2008, Brown, Ralph Tresvant, and Johnny Gill then formed a splinter group, Heads of State, to compete with Bell Biv DeVoe. At the 2009 BET Awards, following the death of the group's idol Michael Jackson, all six of the New Edition members again reunited to perform a medley of Jackson 5 hits in honor of Jackson. This sparked rumors of another full-fledged New Edition reunion, which was confirmed the following year.

Brown and New Edition continue to perform together, including The Culture Tour, which began in early 2022. A year later, the sextet appeared at the Rock and Roll Hall of Fame performing a medley of hits by that year's inductees, soul group The Spinners.

Brown's work with New Edition has since been honored, with the group receiving the BET Lifetime Achievement Award at the 2017 ceremony. In 2022, the group was inducted into the Black Music & Entertainment Walk of Fame. In 2023, they were inducted into the National Rhythm & Blues Hall of Fame.

== Acting and television career ==
Brown made his acting debut with a cameo appearance in the 1989 film, Ghostbusters II, playing the Mayor's doorman. The following year, he appeared in the HBO kids show, Mother Goose Rock 'n' Rhyme playing all three characters of Three Blind Mice. In 1995, he made another guest appearance in the film, Panther, and had a major role in the Martin Lawrence film, A Thin Line Between Love and Hate. Brown made guest appearances in the films Two Can Play That Game, Gang of Roses, Nora's Hair Salon, and Go for Broke.

In 2005, Brown was in negotiations with the Bravo television network for a reality series entitled Being Bobby Brown. Bravo, however, was not ready to commit to the deal unless Brown's superstar wife Whitney Houston agreed to be part of the cast, which she did. The show then received the greenlight from Bravo and was a massive success in the ratings, with Houston proving so popular on the series that she received as much screen time as the show's namesake. The series showed Brown and Houston not always in their best moments. The Hollywood Reporter said that the show was "undoubtedly the most disgusting and execrable series ever to ooze its way onto television". Despite the perceived train-wreck nature of the show, it continued Houston's unbroken string of hit motion pictures and television projects, and it gave Bravo its highest-ever ratings of any of its ongoing series. The show lasted one season and ended in 2006 after Houston stated she would not appear in season two and Bravo and Brown could not settle on a new deal.

In June 2007, Brown took part in the ITV television series 24 Hours With..., a chat show format as celebrity and interviewer spend an intense 24 hours locked in a room together. The show's host, Jamie Campbell, asked Brown questions about his career and private life, and infamously joked about making "sexual moves" towards the singer. Brown was furious and threatened to beat Campbell up live on air. Brown's later tenures in reality shows included appearances on Real Husbands of Hollywood, Celebrity Fit Club and Gone Country.

In 2021, Brown competed in season five of The Masked Singer as the wild card contestant "Crab". At one point after performing Rick James's song "Give It to Me Baby", Brown had to be briefly taken to his dressing room when he became overheated and short of breath in his costume. He was later eliminated on Week 7 alongside Tamera Mowry as "Seashell".

In May 2022, Biography: Bobby Brown and Bobby Brown: Every Little Step began airing on A&E. Brown is an executive-producer of both the documentary-style and reality television series about his life.

== Personal life ==
In 1995, Brown's sister's boyfriend Steven Sealy was targeted in a drive-by shooting; he was killed and Brown, who was with him, was unharmed. The shooter, John Tibbs, took a plea agreement in 2001.

Brown's mother Carole died in 2011 and his father Herbert "Pops" followed in January 2012, a month before Bobby's former wife Whitney Houston's death.

His brother and longtime manager, Tommy Brown, died on March 21, 2026.

=== Marriages ===
Brown first met Whitney Houston at the Soul Train Music Awards in 1989 when he was 20. They began a close friendship after she invited him to her 26th birthday party that August. Their friendship developed into a romance, he proposed in 1991, and they married at Houston's estate on July 18, 1992. Their daughter Bobbi Kristina Brown was born in 1993. Houston and Brown later collaborated on the hit single "Something in Common", which included their daughter at the end of the music video. Due to their combined successes in pop and R&B music, the couple earned a Guinness World Record around 1999 as the "most successful star couple". In 2000, Houston thanked Brown during her acceptance speech for winning the Grammy Award for Best Female R&B Vocal Performance for the 1999 hit, "It's Not Right but It's Okay", which many in the media speculated was hinting at the couple's volatile marriage.

Throughout their marriage, there were rumors of infidelity on Brown's part, alcohol and substance abuse, and domestic violence. Their personal issues became fodder for talk shows, tabloids, and sketch-comedy shows, some of which portrayed Brown as a has-been who was jealous of his wife's celebrity status. In 2003, Brown was charged with battery after an altercation with Houston.

In 2005, the couple participated in the reality show Being Bobby Brown, which gave a picture of their lives behind the scenes. In September 2006, Houston filed for legal separation and later divorce. Their divorce was finalized on April 24, 2007, with Houston receiving custody of their 14-year-old daughter. In a September 2009 interview with Oprah Winfrey, Houston admitted to sometimes using drugs with Brown, stating that Brown had "laced marijuana with cocaine". Houston also told Winfrey that Brown had been abusive during their marriage and even spat on her on one occasion while drunk.

Following the death of Houston on February 11, 2012, six days after his 43rd birthday, Brown struggled to perform at a New Edition show, shouting "I love you, Whitney" in tears. Brown then excused himself from the stage and New Edition finished the remainder of the show. Brown appeared at Houston's memorial service in New Jersey but was asked to leave by the family's security. In an interview given to The Today Show in May 2012, Brown said security was the reason he and his family left the service; Brown stated that he loved Houston's family and told Matt Lauer that he had spent "14 beautiful years" with Houston as his wife. Along with Clive Davis, Ray J, and others, Brown has been accused of contributing to the singer's death, which he denies.

In 2009, Brown had a son named Cassius with his partner of two years, manager Alicia Etheredge. Brown and Etheredge became engaged in May 2010, when Brown proposed during a performance at the Funk Fest in Jacksonville, Florida. The couple married on June 18, 2012, in Hawaii and have since had two daughters.

=== Children ===
Brown has fathered seven children. His eldest, Landon, was born on June 22, 1986, to Melika Williams. He has two children with Kim Ward, whom he met around 1980: daughter La'Princia (b. 1989) and son Bobby Brown Jr. (1992–2020). His and Ward's on-and-off 11-year relationship ended in 1991 when Ward, at three months pregnant, found out that Brown was engaged to Whitney Houston. Houston suffered miscarriages in 1992, 1994, and 1996. His only child with Houston was Bobbi Kristina Brown (1993–2015). Brown has three children with his current wife Alicia Etheredge: a son, Cassius, born in 2009 and daughters Bodhi and Hendrix, born in 2015 and 2016.

In January 2015, Brown's daughter Bobbi Kristina was found unconscious in her bathtub at her residence in Roswell, Georgia. The 21-year-old was rushed to North Fulton Hospital where she was placed on a ventilator in a medically induced coma to stop the swelling of her brain. It was reported her brain activity was "low". Brown rushed to his daughter's side and released a statement to the press requesting them to respect the family's privacy. She was later transferred to Emory University Hospital. After doctors concluded significant brain function was unlikely to occur, Bobbi Kristina was removed from the ventilator and put in the care of Hospice in Duluth, Georgia. She died there on July 26, 2015, at age 22.

On November 18, 2020, Brown's son Bobby Jr., age 28, was found dead in his home. His death was ruled an accidental overdose of cocaine, fentanyl, and alcohol.

=== Health and drug use ===
Brown has struggled with drug and alcohol addiction for most of his life, attributing it to the sexual abuse that was inflicted on him by a Catholic priest when he was a child: "It was part of the reason I did things, other things, drugs, alcohol, why I abused myself." He said, "I had tucked it down so deep into my soul that I didn't think that I would talk about it again."

As a child, Brown was diagnosed with ADD and later with bipolar disorder at age 32. Brown said that his drug of choice was marijuana and that he had developed alcoholism at an early age. Brown was doing drugs all his life before he met Whitney Houston. Brown often contradicted himself on when he began using cocaine, claiming that he did not start using cocaine until after meeting Houston, though he later admitted on his Behind the Music documentary in 2009 that he had been using cocaine prior to meeting Houston.

Throughout the 1990s, his drug addiction worsened and at one point he was cooking cocaine and using heroin.

According to former gang member David Collins, Brown was kidnapped by New York street gang the Preacher Crew over a $25,000 drug debt in 1993. Houston paid a $400,000 ransom to the gang who threatened to kill Brown. The incident was never reported to authorities.

=== Arrests ===
Since 1989, Brown has been arrested multiple times for various offenses:

- In September 1990, Brown was charged with disorderly conduct for refusing to leave a restaurant after his brother Tommy was arrested.
- In April 1995, Brown and two friends were charged in the beating of a nightclub patron in Orlando. Police reported that, after his arrest, Brown urinated in a police patrol car and scratched four-letter words in the vinyl. The charges were dropped after the victim settled a civil lawsuit against Brown.
- In August 1995, Brown was cited for battery after police said he kicked a hotel security guard who was sent to his room to investigate noise complaints.
- In January 1998, Brown was convicted in Florida of driving under the influence and causing property damage. The charges stemmed from 1996, when Brown crashed Houston's sports car into a condominium sign. He served five days in jail then was released on probation.
- In June 1998, Brown was arrested on suspicion of sexual battery for allegedly slapping a woman's bottom at the Beverly Hills Hotel. The case was dropped due to insufficient evidence.
- From May to June 2000, Brown spent 26 days in jail after he was arrested by U.S. Customs agents in New Jersey following a trip from the Bahamas. The arrest stemmed from an outstanding warrant for violating probation in his 1996 drunken driving conviction. The warrant had been issued in June 1999, after Brown's probation officer reported that cocaine had been found in his urine test twice.
- In November 2002, Brown was arrested on drug and traffic charges, and later discovered he was wanted on the 1996 warrant.
- In January 2003, Brown served an eight-day sentence in the DeKalb County, Georgia, jail after he pleaded guilty to a 1996 drunken driving charge and a count of speeding.
- In August 2003, Brown was sentenced to 14 days in jail for probation violations stemming from a 1996 drunken driving charge. His sentence was followed by 60 days of house arrest.
- In December 2003, Brown was charged with battery for striking his wife, Whitney Houston, and threatening to beat her." Police reported that Houston had visible injuries to her face.
- In March 2004, Brown was sentenced to 90 days in jail for owing $63,000 in back child support to Kim Ward. After one night in jail, he was released when Houston paid off the debt.
- In June 2004, Brown received a suspended 90-day prison sentence for missing three consecutive child support payments. The sentence was suspended after six days when Brown made the back payments.
- In February 2007, Brown was sentenced to 30 days in jail for unpaid child support in the amount of $20,000 to Kim Ward. He was released after three days when a radio station paid his fees.
- In April 2012, Brown was arrested for drunken driving. He spent time in a "confidential rehabilitation center" as part of his plea deal.
- In October 2012, Brown was arrested for drunken driving. He was ordered to attend at least three Alcoholics Anonymous sessions each week until he reported to the Los Angeles County jail. In February 2013, Brown was sentenced to 55 days in jail and four years of summary probation following his second drunken driving conviction in a year. He was released after serving nine hours and put on electronic monitoring by Los Angeles County Probation.

== In popular culture ==
Brown popularized the Roger Rabbit dance (aka the "backwards" running man), as performed in the music video for his song "Every Little Step" (1989), along with the Gumby-style hi-top fade. Brown has claimed that he taught Michael Jackson how to do the moonwalk.

Brown was spoofed by Aries Spears on MADtv, with Whitney Houston portrayed by Debra Wilson. He was also spoofed by Tracy Morgan and Finesse Mitchell on Saturday Night Live. Brown was portrayed by Arlen Escarpeta in the television film Whitney, by Woody McClain in the 2017 miniseries The New Edition Story and in the 2018 miniseries about his life, The Bobby Brown Story. Brown is also portrayed by Ashton Sanders in the Whitney Houston biopic, Whitney Houston: I Wanna Dance with Somebody, that was released Christmas 2022.

In 2022, Brown also claimed he started wearing the "diaper pants" that MC Hammer altered and made famous, on his A&E show Bobby Brown: Every Little Step. However, Brown wore a less sagging variation during some concerts and in music videos, such as "My Prerogative" (1988) and "Every Little Step" (1989).

== Discography ==
Studio albums

- King of Stage (1986)
- Don't Be Cruel (1988)
- Bobby (1992)
- Forever (1997)
- The Masterpiece (2012)

with New Edition

- Candy Girl (1983)
- New Edition (1984)
- All for Love (1985)
- Home Again (1996)

== Tours ==
- Heartbreak Tour (1988)
- Don't Be Cruel Tour (1988–1991)
- Humpin' Around the World Tour (1992–1993)
- New Edition Reunion Tour (with New Edition) (1996–97)
- Forever Tour (1997–1998)
- Heads of State Tour (2008–2014)
- RBRM Tour (2018)
- The Culture Tour (2022)
- The Legacy Tour (2023)

== Filmography ==
=== Film ===
Year	Title	Role	Notes
1984	Be Somebody... or Be Somebody's Fool!	Himself	Video
1985	Krush Groove	Himself	
1989	Ghostbusters II	Mayor's Doorman	
1990	Mother Goose Rock 'n' Rhyme	Three Blind Mice	TV movie
1995	Panther	Rose	
1996	A Thin Line Between Love and Hate	Tee	
2001	Two Can Play That Game	Michael	
2002	Go for Broke	Jive	
2003	Gang of Roses	Left Eye Watkins	
2004	Nora's Hair Salon	Bennie	
2008	Nora's Hair Salon 2: A Cut Above	Old Man Butter	
2017	A Kindred Soul	Uncle	Short

=== Television ===
Year	Title	Role	Notes
1984–86	American Bandstand	Himself	Recurring Guest
1984–92	Soul Train	Himself	Recurring Guest
1985	Solid Gold	Himself	Episode: "Episode #5.20"
1988–89	America's Top 10	Himself	Episode: "(1988-12)" & "Top 10 Songs of 1989"
1989	227	Himself	Episode: "Video Activity"
1989–96	Top of the Pops	Himself	Recurring Guest
1992	Saturday Night Live	Himself	Episode: "Nicolas Cage/Bobby Brown"
1993	American Music Awards	Himself/Co-Host	Main Co-Host
1993	Out All Night	Himself	Episode: "A Date with a Diva"
1996	Family Matters	Himself	Episode: "Home Again"
2000–02	Where Are They Now?	Himself	Recurring Guest
2003	Cedric the Entertainer Presents	Himself	Episode: "Episode #1.16"
2005	Behind the Music	Himself	Episode: "New Edition"
2005	Dateline NBC	Himself	Episode: "Episode #13.51"
2005	Being Bobby Brown	Himself	Main Cast
2005	Cuts	Himself	Episode: "Blinging in the New Year"
2007	24 Hours with...	Himself	Episode: "Bobby Brown"
2008	Gone Country	Himself	Main Cast: Season 1
2009	Played by Fame	Himself	Episode: "Kickin' the Habit"
2010	Celebrity Fit Club	Himself	Main Cast: Season 7
2011	Celebrity Close Calls	Himself	Episode: "Bobby Brown/Morgan Fairchild/Jewel/Elliott Yamin"
2013–14	Unsung	Himself	Episode: "Johnny Gill" & "Troop"
2013–15	Real Husbands of Hollywood	Himself	Guest: Season 1, Recurring Cast: Season 2–3
2017	Hollywood Medium	Himself	Episode: "Eva Longoria/Bobby Brown/Jwoww"
2017	Hip Hop Squares	Himself/Center Square	Recurring Guest
2017	Love & Hip Hop: Hollywood	Himself	Episode: "Boy Band"
2017	Lip Sync Battle	Himself	Episode: "Soul Train Special"
2019	American Soul	Rufus Thomas	Episode: "Lost and Found"
2021	The Masked Singer	Himself/Crab	Contestant: Season 5
2021	Crank Yankers	Bobby Brown's Uncle/Mike Tyson (voice)	Episode: "Episode #6.5" & "#6.9"
2022	Bobby Brown: Every Little Step	Himself	Main Cast

== Bibliography ==
- Every Little Step: My Story (2016)
