= Ricky Bell (singer) =

American singer (born 1967)

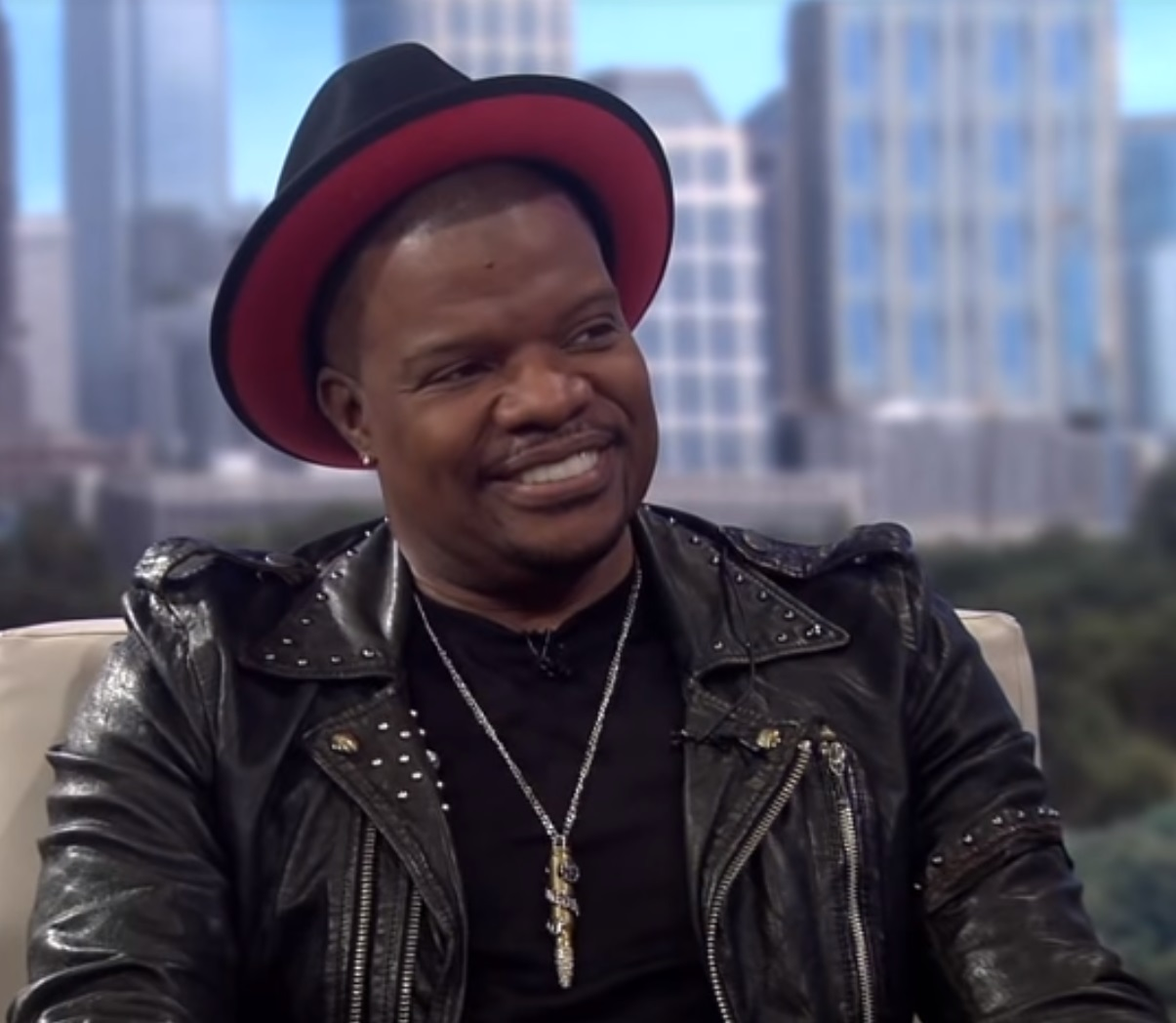
- Ricky Bell on Sister Circle Live in 2018

Background information
- Also known as: Slick
- Born: Ricardo Bell; September 18, 1967 (age 59)
- Origin: Roxbury, Massachusetts, U.S.
- Genres: R&B; pop; hip hop; New jack swing
- Occupations: Singer; rapper
- Instrument: Vocals
- Years active: 1978–present
- Labels: CD Baby (solo) (2000); So So Def/Geffen (2008–present)

Ricardo Bell (born September 18, 1967) is an American singer and rapper, best known as one of the founding members of R&B/pop group New Edition, and the lead singer of Bell Biv DeVoe. As a solo artist, Bell released the album Ricardo Campana in 2000.

== Early life and career ==
The youngest of eleven children, Bell was born in Roxbury, Boston, Massachusetts and grew up in the Orchard Park Projects. He began his career singing with close friend Ralph Tresvant in the group Ricky and Ralph. Later, Bell, along with Michael Bivins, Bobby Brown, Ralph Tresvant, and Ronnie DeVoe formed New Edition. The group began a career in 1978 that has spanned more than 40 years. After the departure of Brown, Johnny Gill joined the group in the mid-1980s. Before Gill joined the group, Bell was originally the oldest member of New Edition. After the group recorded the album "Heartbreak", Bell was given the chance to go solo but opted instead to form Bell Biv DeVoe, with Bivins and DeVoe.

The "best kept secret" originally gained the respect of the industry when record producer Jimmy Jam had the idea for the spin-off group Bell Biv DeVoe with Bell as the lead singer. BBD, as the group is commonly known, was the first to integrate elements of Rap and R&B consistently, calling their style "Hip-hop smoothed out on an R&B tip with a pop feel appeal to it." BBD's 1990 debut established Bell as a lead singer capable of chart topping success. Though Bell had primarily performed as a backup vocalist with New Edition, he emerged as one of the most utilized voices on singles released by the group in the 1990s. With the exception of the ensemble songs "Hot2Nite" and "Hit Me Off", and the Brown-led "You Don't Have to Worry," Bell performed lead or co-lead on the remainder of the group's charting singles.

With Bell Biv DeVoe and New Edition, Bell has over two dozen TV and film performances including Knight Rider, The Fresh Prince of Bel-Air, New York Undercover, Family Matters, the movie Krush Groove, and numerous music, variety and awards programs.

Bell sang the BBD hit "Poison" along with Ne-Yo at the 2009 BET Awards.

In 2008, Bell, as a member of New Edition, was the recipient of the Golden Note Award at ASCAP's 21st Annual Rhythm & Soul Music Awards. In 2017, Bell Biv DeVoe released a new album called Three Stripes; it was the trio's first album in 15 years.

== Personal life ==
In 2004, in a double wedding with Tresvant, Bell married actress Amy Correa. Bell is a fan of the Boston Celtics.

In The New Edition Story miniseries released in 2017, it was revealed that Bell had struggled with substance abuse in the mid-1990s, using marijuana, cocaine, ecstasy, alcohol, and oxycontin to the point of losing his house and selling his personal property to satisfy his addictions. Eventually, he overdosed on cocaine and nearly lost his life, prompting him to enter rehab. Bell has maintained sobriety since checking out of rehabilitation. In contrast to fellow New Edition member Bobby Brown, whose drug struggles were covered prominently in the media during this time period, Bell's struggles with addiction were not publicized until the release of the miniseries in 2017.

== Discography ==
New Edition

- Candy Girl (1983)
- New Edition (1984)
- All for Love (1985)
- Under the Blue Moon (1986)
- Heart Break (1988)
- Home Again (1996)
- One Love (2004)

Bell Biv DeVoe

- Poison (1990)
- Hootie Mack (1993)
- BBD (2001)
- Three Stripes (2017)

Solo

- Ricardo Campana Genre: R&B (October 24, 2000)

=== Track listing ===
1. Spanish Fly - 5:06
2. My Body - 4:47
3. Can't Stay Away - 5:11
4. It's All About You - 4:30
5. Come Back - 4:51
6. Struggle ft. Johnny Gill (Urban mix) - 3:44
7. Have Ya Cake ft. Ronnie DeVoe - 4:52
8. If I Had My Way - 4:41
9. Still I See ft. Ronnie DeVoe & Greg Lawson - 8:04
10. Down 4 Life - 4:16
11. Sunday ft. Ronnie DeVoe - 4:35
12. Struggle ft. Johnny Gill (Smooth edit) - 3:28
