= Ronnie DeVoe =

American singer and rapper (born 1967)

- DeVoe in 2026

Background information
- Born: Ronald Boyd DeVoe Jr. November 17, 1967 (age 58)
- Origin: Roxbury, Massachusetts, U.S.
- Genres: R&B; pop; hip hop; new jack swing
- Occupations: Singer; rapper
- Years active: 1981–present
- Labels: Streetwise; MCA; Bad Boy; Biv 10
- Member of: New Edition; Bell Biv DeVoe
- Spouse: Shamari Fears (m. 2006)

Ronald Boyd DeVoe Jr. (born November 17, 1967), is an American singer and rapper. known as one of the members of the R&B/pop group New Edition, and the R&B/hip hop group Bell Biv DeVoe. He was born in Roxbury, Massachusetts.

== Career ==
DeVoe was the second-to-last member to join New Edition (Johnny Gill being the last) after being brought in by his uncle and the group's choreographer Brooke Payne. In 1981, the group took second place at a talent show, which caught the eye of record producer Maurice Starr, who signed them to his Streetwise record label. New Edition was the biggest-selling boy band from the mid to late 1980s.

After New Edition's 1990 breakup, DeVoe and fellow New Edition members Ricky Bell and Michael Bivins formed the R&B/hip-hop group Bell Biv DeVoe. Bell Biv DeVoe's 1990 debut album Poison sold more than 5 million copies and garnered five hit singles, such as "Poison" and "B.B.D. (I Thought It Was Me)?". In 1993, DeVoe and the group released their follow-up album Hootie Mack.

In 1996, DeVoe reunited with the other original members of New Edition to release the album Home Again, followed by a world tour ending in 1997.

In 2001, DeVoe and Bell Biv DeVoe released BBD.

In 2014, DeVoe made a brief cameo appearance in the film Think Like a Man Too.

In 2017, DeVoe and Bell Biv DeVoe released Three Stripes.

In 2018, DeVoe began to appear as a guest-member of Bravo's series The Real Housewives of Atlanta. His wife Shamari became a regular cast member when Season 11 premiered on November 4, 2018.

In 2020, DeVoe expanded his business with DeVoe Realty offering comprehensive real estate services.

DeVoe still performs and records with New Edition and Bell Biv DeVoe, and he is co-owner of DeVoe Broker Associates, a real estate agency in Atlanta, Georgia.

== Personal life ==
He has been married to Shamari DeVoe of the R&B group Blaque since March 10, 2006. In 2017, they welcomed twin sons.

== Discography ==
New Edition

- Candy Girl (1983)
- New Edition (1984)
- All for Love (1985)
- Under the Blue Moon (1986)
- Heart Break (1988)
- Home Again (1996)
- One Love (2004)

Bell Biv DeVoe

- Poison (1990)
- Hootie Mack (1993)
- BBD (2001)
- Three Stripes (2017)
