= Michael Bivins =

American singer (born 1968)

- Bivins in 2026

Background information
- Also known as: Biv; M.B.
- Born: Michael Lamont Bivins; August 10, 1968 (age 58); Boston, Massachusetts, U.S.
- Genres: New jack swing; hip hop; R&B
- Occupations: Singer; Producer; CEO of Sportyrich Enterprises; Rapper
- Instrument: Vocals
- Years active: 1978–present
- Label: SportyRich Enterprises
- Website: Link

Michael Lamont Bivins (born August 10, 1968) is an American singer, rapper, manager, and producer, and a founding member of New Edition and Bell Biv DeVoe.

== Personal life ==
Bivins was born in Boston. He and his wife, Teasha, have four daughters: Savannah, Shilah, Starlah, and Sanaah Bivins.

== Career ==
Michael Bivins is one of the founding members of New Edition. When the group broke up he formed Bell Biv DeVoe with Ricky Bell and Ronnie DeVoe. The group is credited with being one of the pioneers of the new jack swing sound. Their debut album, Poison, peaked at number five on the Billboard 200 chart in 1990.

He also discovers, manages, and produces for other acts, most notably Sudden Impact, Another Bad Creation, MC Brains, Boyz II Men, and 702, all of whom were signed to his Motown distributed label Biv 10 Records. He serves as the music entrepreneur and A&R man of both of his own acts. Bivins also produced The New Edition Story, a biographical miniseries that ran on BET in 2017.

Bivins' credits include CSR 103.9 in the hit video game Grand Theft Auto: San Andreas. Most recently, he appeared in the basketball film Crossover as the character, Heart Attack. Bivins also managed Artist Development on the reality competition show Making the Band 4 and is CEO and founder of Sporty Rich Enterprises record label.

In 2025, Bivins joined the morning news team on WGN-TV as a guest.

== Discography ==
New Edition

- Candy Girl (1983)
- New Edition (1984)
- All for Love (1985)
- Under the Blue Moon (1986)
- Heart Break (1988)
- Home Again (1996)
- One Love (2004)

Bell Biv DeVoe

- Poison (1990)
- Hootie Mack (1993)
- BBD (2001)
- Three Stripes (2017)

== Singles ==
- (2009) Fresh (Featuring Clipse & Lil' Kim)
