= Heartbreak Tour =

1988–89 concert tour by New Edition

- Tour by New Edition
- Associated album: Heart Break
- Start date: September 21, 1988
- End date: July 29, 1989
- Legs: 3
- No. of shows: 112

New Edition concert chronology
- All 4 Love Tour (1986); Heartbreak Tour (1988–89); Home Again Tour (1996-97)

The Heartbreak Tour was a concert tour by American boy band New Edition. The tour supported their fifth studio album, Heart Break (1988).

== Background ==
On their previous tour, New Edition had to perform as a four-piece act after Bobby Brown's departure, but in the spring of 1987, Johnny Gill was added to the group. The five-member group went back to the studio to record what is now considered their most influential album: Heart Break, released June 20, 1988. By the beginning of fall, the album had reached platinum status and New Edition were ready to hit the stage again. Bobby Brown, who had released Don't Be Cruel on the same day as Heart Break, and Al B Sure!, who had found success with his first album In Effect Mode, both joined as opening acts.

The Heartbreak Tour was the 16th most popular tour of 1988 with the first leg grossing $14.1 million in ticket sales, according to Pollstar. Arenas in cities like Inglewood, Chicago and Detroit were sold out two or thee times. They even achieved sell-outs in certain Southern cities that had not sold out in over a decade. The five members were awarded a gold ticket by Madison Square Garden for sales of over 100,000 tickets.

The group was involved in a school dropout prevention campaign. They sponsored "What School Means to Me", a nationwide essay contest at elementary schools. The winner of the competition was invited to attend a New Edition concert and meet the group backstage.

== Incidents ==
New Edition extended their schedule by headlining "Kiss Concert" in Mansfield, Massachusetts, and then performed a few shows for Budweiser Superfest. Their engagement with Budweiser was cut short when, on July 8 in Greensboro, as Guy was ending its act, members of New Edition came on stage, upset that Guy might have played too long. A member of Guy was reported to have kicked or pushed a piece of New Edition's equipment off stage. New Edition confronted Guy, a fight occurred, the groups' bodyguards joined in the scuffle as band members threw microphones and kicked music equipment, before officers and Coliseum security guards stepped in. New Edition band members later returned to the stage to play. Before they started, one of them apologized to the crowd of 13,755 people and tried to explain the fight, saying Guy staff members were "messing with their instruments", which almost caused them to not be able to perform. New Edition members said that Karyn White loaned them equipment to perform with, because theirs had been damaged in the scuffle. After the concert, the members of Guy allegedly threatened New Edition saying they were going to "get them". According to a witness, members of New Edition flew several men from New York to Pittsburgh to provide the band with "muscle, to do whatever they had to do". While the three members of Guy were preparing to leave the Coliseum in a limousine, an unidentified person began shouting insults and threats at the band. The three members left the vehicle and followed the unidentified person back to the Coliseum floor behind the stage, but police moved in to restrain band members. Police in Greensboro said that no arrests were made, and Coliseum officials declined to comment on the fighting.

The next day in Pittsburgh, while stagehands of New Edition and Guy were setting up equipment for the concert, two Guy "roadies" attacked a crew member of New Edition near the Civic Arena stage. One man pounded another man with a baseball bat, and other crew members pulled out guns and knives. New Edition's production manager, 30-year-old Ronald Byrd, chased Guy's security manager Anthony Bee, 32, out of the arena and across the street into the Hyatt Hotel at about 4:30 p.m. and shot him twice outside the hotel. Bee died at the Mercy Hospital. Ronald Byrd was charged with criminal homicide. Four members of Guy's crew were jailed on assault charges in the beating of New Edition crew member Michael Clark. It has been said that the crew members had been feuding over stage arrangements and other matters for weeks, according to stagehands.

Following this incident, Tom Pagano (spokesman for Anheuser-Busch) announced that Anheuser-Busch had dropped New Edition and Guy from the tour roster.

== Opening acts ==
- Bobby Brown (September 1988-February 1989)
- Al B Sure! (September 1988-February 1989)
- The Gyrlz (in Saginaw, January 17, 1989)

== Setlist ==
1. "That's the Way We're Livin'"
2. "Count Me Out"
3. "Cool It Now"
4. "Crucial"
5. (Jealous Girl Interlude)
6. "Is This the End"
7. "Lost in Love"
8. "You're Not My Kind of Girl"
9. "Boys to Men"
10. "Can You Stand the Rain"
11. (DJ Spinbad Interlude)
12. "N.E. Heartbreak"
13. "If It Isn't Love"

Notes

- "Mr. Telephone Man" was performed in the 1989 shows, Bobby Brown joined the group on stage to sing lead.
- "I'm Coming Home" was often performed.

== Tour dates ==
Date	City	Country	Venue
1988
September 21	Greenville	United States	Greenville Memorial Auditorium
September 22	Augusta	United States	Augusta Civic Center
September 23	Tampa	United States	USF Dome
September 24	Atlanta	United States	The Omni
September 25	Greensboro	United States	Greensboro Coliseum
September 28	Albany	United States	Albany Civic Center
September 29	Savannah	United States	Savannah Civic Center
September 30	Birmingham	United States	Birmingham-Jefferson Civic Center Coliseum
October 1	Jacksonville	United States	Memorial Coliseum
October 2	Miami	United States	Miami Arena
October 5	Louisville	United States	Louisville Gardens
October 6	Milwaukee	United States	MECCA Arena
October 7	Chicago	United States	UIC Pavilion
October 8	Chicago	United States	UIC Pavilion
October 9	Memphis	United States	Mid-South Coliseum
October 12	Oklahoma City	United States	Myriad Convention Center
October 13	Kansas City	United States	Kemper Arena
October 16	Indianapolis	United States	Market Square Arena
October 17	Detroit	United States	Joe Louis Arena
October 18	Detroit	United States	Joe Louis Arena
October 19	Pensacola	United States	Pensacola Civic Center
October 21	New Orleans	United States	Louisiana Superdome
October 23	Dallas	United States	Reunion Arena
October 24	Austin	United States	Travis County Expo Center
October 27	New York	United States	Madison Square Garden
October 28	Philadelphia	United States	Spectrum
October 29	Buffalo	United States	Buffalo Memorial Auditorium
October 30	Bosoton	United States	Boston Garden
October 31	Bosoton	United States	Boston Garden
November 2	Philadelphia	United States	Spectrum
November 4	Hartford	United States	Hartford Civic Center
November 6	Landover	United States	Capital Center
November 9	Pittsburgh	United States	Pittsburgh Civic Arena
November 11	Hampton	United States	Hampton Coliseum
November 12	Richmond	United States	Richmond Coliseum
November 13	Cincinnati	United States	Riverfront Coliseum
November 16	Denver	United States	McNichols Sports Arena
November 20	Inglewood	United States	The Forum
November 23	Inglewood	United States	The Forum
November 24	Inglewood	United States	The Forum
November 25	Sacramento	United States	ARCO Arena
November 26	San Bernardino	United States	Orange Pavilion
November 27	Fresno	United States	Selland Arena
November 29	Portland	United States	Memorial Coliseum
November 30	Seattle	United States	Seattle Center Coliseum
December 2	Oakland	United States	Oakland Coliseum Arena
December 3	Oakland	United States	Oakland Coliseum Arena
December 4	Oakland	United States	Oakland Coliseum Arena
December 6	Tucson	United States	Tucson Convention Center
December 7	Shreveport	United States	Hirsch Memorial Coliseum
December 11	Columbia	United States	Carolina Coliseum
December 13	Cleveland	United States	Public Hall
December 14	Chicago IL	United States	UIC Pavilion
December 17	Hampton	United States	Hampton Coliseum
December 18	New York City	United States	Madison Square Garden
1989
January 16	Louisville	United States	Louisville Gardens
January 17	Saginaw	United States	Wendler Arena
January 18	Columbus	United States	Celeste Center
January 20	Charlotte	United States	Charlotte Coliseum
January 21	Richmond	United States	Richmond Coliseum
January 26	Greenville	United States	Greenville Memorial Auditorium
January 27	Roanoke	United States	Civic Center
January 28	Chattanooga	United States	UTC Arena
January 29	Macon	United States	Macon Coliseum
January 31	Philadelphia	United States	Spectrum
February 1	Rochester	United States	War Memorial
February 3	Providence	United States	Providence Civic Center
February 4	New York City	United States	Madison Square Garden
February 7	Pittsburgh	United States	Civic Arena
February 9	Dayton	United States	Hara Arena
February 10	Montgomery	United States	Garrett Coliseum
February 11	Detroit	United States	Joe Louis Arena
February 13	Orlando	United States	Orlando Centroplex Arena
February 14	Atlanta	United States	The Omni
February 16	Kalamazoo	United States	Wings Stadium
February 17	Bloomington	United States	Met Center
February 19	Memphis	United States	Mid-South Coliseum
February 21	Worcester	United States	Worcester Centrum
February 24	Las cruces	United States	Pan American Center
February 25	Gary	United States	Genesis Convention Center
February 26	Daly City	United States	Cow Palace
February 27	Inglewood	United States	The Forum

Summer 1989

Date	City	Country	Venue
1989
May 24	West Allis	United States	Wisconsin State Fair Grandstand
June 2	Austin	United States	Frank Erwin Center
June 3	Mansfield	United States	Great Woods Center For The Performong Arts
June 17	Washington DC	United States	RFK Stadium
June 18	Charlotte	United States	Carowinds Paladium
June 23	Little Rock	United States	Barton Coliseum
June 24	Houston	United States	The Summit
June 25	Dallas	United States	Reunion Arena
June 27	Honolulu	United States	Blaisdell Arena
July 1	Los Angeles	United States	Los Angeles Memorial Coliseum
July 4	Portland	United States	Veterans Memorial Coliseum
July 8	Greensboro	United States	Greensboro Coliseum
August 27	Santa Clara	United States	Universal Amphitheater
