= D-O-G Me Out =

1991 single by Guy

Single by Guy

from the album The Future
- Released: August 8, 1991
- Recorded: 1990, 1991
- Genre: R&B, new jack swing
- Length: 4:23
- Label: MCA
- Songwriters: Teddy Riley, Aaron Hall, Dave Way
- Producer: Teddy Riley

Guy singles chronology
"Do Me Right" (1991)	"D-O-G Me Out" (1991)	"Let's Stay Together" (1992)

"D-O-G Me Out" is a song by the American R&B group Guy recorded for their second studio album The Future (1990). It was released in August 1991, the fourth single from the album.

== Track listings ==
12", Vinyl

1. "D-O-G Me Out" (Canine Club Version) – 6:27
2. "D-O-G Me Out" (Dogapella) – 6:22
3. "D-O-G Me Out" (Mike Nice Mix) – 5:40
4. "D-O-G Me Out" (Mike Nice Dub Mix) – 5:37

CD, Maxi

1. "D-O-G Me Out" (Single Edit)
2. "D-O-G Me Out" (Single Edit w/ Rap)
3. "D-O-G Me Out" (Canine Club Version)
4. "D-O-G Me Out" (Wrecks N Effect Rap)
5. "D-O-G Me Out" (Dogapella)
6. "D-O-G Me Out" (Wrecks N Effectstrumental)
7. "D-O-G Me Out" (Mike Nice Dub Mix)

== Chart performance ==
Chart (1991–92)	Peak position
Australia (ARIA)	148
U.S. Hot Dance Music/Maxi-Singles Sales	15
U.S. Hot R&B/Hip-Hop Singles & Tracks	8
