= Fight for Me =

Fight for Me may refer to:

- "Fight for Me", a song by Abigail Breslin from the soundtrack for Janie Jones
- "Fight for Me", a song by Ava Max from the album Don't Click Play
- "Fight for Me", a song by Crystal Shawanda from the album Just Like You
- "Fight for Me", a song by Wildbirds & Peacedrums from the album Rivers
- "Fight for Me", a song by Barkaa
- "Fight for Me", a song by Bullethead (band)
- "Fight for Me", a song by Gawvi
- "Fight for Me", a song by Hana (American musician)
- "Fight for Me", a song by K-Anthony
- "Fight for Me", a song by Martha Munizzi
- "Fight for Me", a song from the musical Heathers: The Musical
- "Fight for Me", a song from the Riverdale episode "Chapter Fifty-One: Big Fun"
