= I Like (Guy song) =

Single by Guy

from the album Guy
- B-side: "Groove Me"
- Released: 1989
- Recorded: 1988
- Genre: R&B, new jack swing
- Length: 4:50
- Label: Uptown/MCA
- Songwriters: A. Hall, T. Gatling, T. Riley
- Producer: Teddy Riley

Guy singles chronology
"Teddy's Jam" (1988)	"I Like" (1989)	"Spend the Night" (1989)

"I Like" is a song by American R&B group Guy recorded for their debut studio album Guy (1988). The song was released as the album's fourth single in 1989. The album version clocks at 4:54 while the single was 12-inch only and was composed entirely of edits.

The song peaked at number seventy on the Billboard Hot 100 chart.

== Track listing ==
12" single

1. "I Like" (Extended Version) – 8:17
2. "I Like" (Radio Edit) – 5:40
3. "I Like" (Hype Version) – 4:50
4. "I Like" (Dub Version) – 4:45

12" promo

1. "I Like" (Extended Version) – 8:17
2. "I Like" (Acapella) – 4:02
3. "I Like" (Radio Edit) – 5:40
4. "I Like" (Instrumental) – 4:55
5. "I Like" (Hype Mix) – 4:50
6. "I Like" (Dub Version) – 4:45

== Personnel ==
Information taken from Discogs.

- Arranging – Teddy Riley
- Background arranging – Teddy Riley
- Engineering – Dennis Mitchell
- Executive production – Guy
- Guitar overdubbing – Bernard Bell
- Production – Teddy Riley
- Remix engineering – Dennis Mitchell
- Remixing – Teddy Riley
- Writing – Timothy Gatling, Aaron Hall, Teddy Riley

== Charts ==
=== Weekly charts ===
Chart (1989)	Peak position
US Billboard Hot 100	70
US Dance Club Songs (Billboard)	36
US Hot R&B/Hip-Hop Songs (Billboard)	2

=== Year-end charts ===
Chart (1989)	Position
US Hot R&B/Hip-Hop Songs (Billboard)	35
