= The Future (Guy album) =

Studio album by Guy
- Released: November 13, 1990
- Recorded: 1989–1990
- Studio: Soundtrack (New York City)
- Genre: New jack swing
- Length: 72:02
- Label: Uptown; MCA
- Producer: Guy; Teddy Riley; Bernard Belle; Aqil Davidson; Brandon Mitchell

Guy chronology
Guy (1988)	The Future (1990)	Guy III (2000)

Singles from The Future
- 1. "Wanna Get with U" Released: October 9, 1990; 2. "Let's Chill" Released: February 18, 1991; 3. "Do Me Right" Released: April 24, 1991; 4. "D-O-G Me Out" Released: August 6, 1991; 5. "Her" Released: September 24, 1991; 6. "Teddy's Jam 2" Released: October 20, 1991; 7. "Let's Stay Together" Released: January 14, 1992

The Future is the second studio album by American R&B group Guy, released on November 13, 1990, on Uptown Records. It was their last album before their reunion a decade later.

== Background ==
The Future had a much darker tone in stark contrast to their debut. Most of it had to do with things going on behind the scenes. A year after the release of their debut album, they fired their manager Gene Griffin—who they claimed allocated funds from the group. This revelation angered all of the members, and particularly infuriated lead singer Aaron Hall—so much so that he didn't sing on half of the album. Hall revealed:

"There came a time where [sic] I just did not want to sing a single note. To be honest, it was the money. It just became too depressing. We were the biggest group in the world and we were flat broke. It took its toll".

As a result, Teddy Riley assumed the duties of lead vocals for the remainder of The Future.

Also on a tour with their MCA labelmates New Edition, things got out of hand between the two acts. Although New Edition were headliners, Guy happened to upstage them a few dates into the tour. This created a rivalry backstage that turned deadly. One of New Edition's production managers Ronald Boyd shot and killed Anthony Bee—a member of Guy's security detail. Guy would dedicate the song "Long Gone" to the memory of Bee, as well as Wreckx-n-Effect member Brandon Mitchell, who was also killed in the same year. The Future contained songs where they attacked their former manager Gene Griffin and his then-proteges, Motown Records recording group Basic Black. By the time they released the fifth single "Let's Stay Together" in early 1992, Guy called it quits and embarked on separate endeavors, with Aaron and Damion Hall releasing solo albums and Riley starting the group Blackstreet with Damion Hall's protege Chauncey Black, along with close friends Levi Little and Joseph Stonestreet.

== Covers ==
A couple of the songs from The Future have been covered. Priority Records singer Toni Estes covered the song "Let's Chill" from her 2000 debut Two Eleven. Singer Charlie Wilson also covered "Let's Chill" from his 2005 album Charlie, Last Name Wilson. R&B singer Case covered the song "Smile" on his 2009 album The Rose Experience.

== Release and reception ==
The Future peaked at number sixteen on the U.S. Billboard 200 and reached number one on the R&B Albums chart. By January 1991, it was certified platinum in sales by the RIAA after sales exceeding one million copies in the United States.

Although Alex Henderson of AllMusic felt The Future was not as strong an album as its predecessor, he still gave a positive note to the work, calling it "one of the more appealing—and certainly more authentic—examples of "new jack swing."

== Track listing ==
No.	Title	Writer(s)	Length
1.	"Her"	Aqil Davidson, Aaron Hall, Teddy Riley	3:53
2.	"Wanna Get with U"	Davidson, Hall, Riley	4:47
3.	"Do Me Right" (featuring Heavy D)	Heavy D, Riley, Way	4:23
4.	"Teddy's Jam 2"		4:19
5.	"Let's Chill"	Bernard Belle, Riley	5:23
6.	"Tease Me Tonite"	Hall, Riley, Dave Way	5:08
7.	"D-O-G Me Out"	Hall, Riley, Way	4:23
8.	"Total Control"	Davidson, Riley	3:00
9.	"Gotta Be a Leader" (featuring Wreckx-N-Effect)	Davidson, Riley	4:28
10.	"The Future"	Aaron Hall, Damion Hall, Riley, Way	4:12
11.	"Let's Stay Together"	Hall, Riley	4:01
12.	"Where Did the Love Go"	Hall, Hall, Riley	1:15
13.	"Yearning for Your Love"	Oliver Scott, Ronnie Wilson	4:35
14.	"Smile"	Hall, Hall, Riley	4:25
15.	"Long Gone"	Belle, Riley	5:52
16.	"Wanna Get with U" (club version)	Davidson, Hall, Riley	7:58
Total length:			72:02

- "Where Did the Love Go", "Yearning for Your Love" and "Smile" are not available on the vinyl release of The Future.
- "Wanna Get with U" [Club Version] is not available on the cassette release of The Future.

== Personnel ==
Credits adapted from the CD liner notes.

=== Vocals ===
- Tammy Lucas – background vocals (7, 11, 15)
- Mary Brown – background vocals (7, 15)
- Marsha McClurkin – background vocals (15)

=== Technical ===
- Teddy Riley – producer, all instruments, programming
- Guy – co-producers (1–3, 5–7, 9–16), background vocals (1–3, 5, 7, 10, 11, 13–16)
- Aaron Hall – co-producer (8), keyboards (6, 12, 14)
- Wreckx-N-Effect – co-producers (9), background vocals (1, 9)
- Bernard Belle – co-producer (5, 12), background vocals (5, 15)
- David "DJ" Wynn & Steve "Cut Technician" Thomas – scratching
- Dave Way – engineer, mixing at Soundworks Studio, New York City
- Mike Fossenkemper, Jim Kvoriack, Rich July, Kevin Kelly, Scott Canto, Dave Lebowitz – assistant engineers
- Chris Trevett – additional mixing (1, 5, 9)
- Herb Powers – mastering at Hit Factory, New York City

=== Artwork ===
- Carol Kim – personal assistant
- Jeannie Bradshaw – art direction and design
- Todd Gray – photography
- Stuart Wilson – logo and additional photography
- Keith Holman – stylist
- Guy & Charles Darrisaw – hair stylists
- La-Lette Littlejohn – makeup
- Sammy & Mike at Gallery 2000 – jewelry

== Charts ==
=== Weekly charts ===
Chart (1990–1991)	Peak position
Australian Albums (ARIA)	129
US Billboard 200	16
US Top R&B/Hip-Hop Albums (Billboard)	1

=== Year-end charts ===
Chart (1991)	Position
US Billboard 200	35
US Top R&B/Hip-Hop Albums (Billboard)	3

== See also ==
- List of number-one R&B albums of 1991 (U.S.)
