= Spencer Bernard =

Spencer Bernard may refer to:

- Spencer Bernard (songwriter)
- Spencer Bernard (politician)
