= 'Round and 'Round (Merry Go 'Round of Love) =

Single by Guy

from the album Guy
- Released: April 12, 1988
- Recorded: 1987
- Genre: R&B, new jack swing
- Length: 4:07
- Label: Uptown/MCA
- Songwriters: Griffin, Hall, Riley
- Producers: Gene Griffin, Teddy Riley

Guy singles chronology
"'Round and 'Round (Merry Go 'Round of Love)" (1988)	"Groove Me" (1988)

"'Round and 'Round (Merry Go 'Round of Love)" is a song by American R&B group Guy recorded for their self-titled debut album Guy (1988). The song was released as the album's debut single in 1988. The bassline interpolates Michael Jackson's Thriller.

== Track listing ==
12", Vinyl

1. "'Round and 'Round (Merry Go 'Round of Love)" (12" Version) - 7:52
2. "'Round and 'Round (Merry Go 'Round of Love)" (Acapella) - 4:14
3. "'Round and 'Round (Merry Go 'Round of Love)" (Radio Edit) - 5:43
4. "'Round and 'Round (Merry Go 'Round of Love)" (Dub Version) - 8:43
5. "'Round and 'Round (Merry Go 'Round of Love)" (House Mix) - 7:48
6. "'Round and 'Round (Merry Go 'Round of Love)" (Bonus Beats) - 1:49

== Chart performance ==
Chart (1988)	Peak position
U.S. Hot R&B/Hip-Hop Singles & Tracks	24
