= Control (Janet Jackson album) =

Studio album by Janet Jackson
- Released: February 4, 1986
- Recorded: June–October 1985
- Studios: Flyte Tyme (Minneapolis, Minnesota)
- Genres: Pop; R&B; Minneapolis sound
- Length: 41:48
- Label: A&M
- Producers: John McClain (exec.); Jimmy Jam and Terry Lewis; Janet Jackson; Monte Moir

Janet Jackson chronology
Dream Street (1984)	Control (1986)	Control: The Remixes (1987)

Singles from Control
- 1. "What Have You Done for Me Lately" Released: January 13, 1986; 2. "Nasty" Released: April 4, 1986; 3. "When I Think of You" Released: July 28, 1986; 4. "Control" Released: October 21, 1986; 5. "Let's Wait Awhile" Released: January 6, 1987; 6. "The Pleasure Principle" Released: May 12, 1987; 7. "Funny How Time Flies (When You're Having Fun)" Released: November 2, 1987

Control is the third studio album by American singer Janet Jackson, released on February 4, 1986, by A&M Records. Her collaborations with the songwriters and record producers Jimmy Jam and Terry Lewis resulted in an unconventional sound: a fusion of rhythm and blues, rap vocals, funk, disco, and synthesized percussion that established Jackson, Jam, and Lewis as leading innovators of contemporary R&B. The distinctive triplet swing beat used on the record is a precursor to the new jack swing genre. The album became Jackson's commercial breakthrough, helped her transition into the popular music market, and made Control one of the defining albums of the 1980s and contemporary music.

With its autobiographical themes, most of the album's lyrics reflected a series of changes in her life: a recent annulment of her marriage to singer James DeBarge, severing business ties with her father and manager Joseph and the rest of the Jackson family, hiring A&M executive John McClain as her new manager, and her subsequent introduction to Jam and Lewis. Critics have praised the album as both an artistic achievement and a personal statement of self-actualization. It has also been regarded as a template for numerous female artists, particularly Black women, to model their careers.

Following its release, Control became Jackson's first album to top the Billboard 200 albums chart in the United States and five of its commercially released singles—"What Have You Done for Me Lately", "Nasty", "When I Think of You", "Control", and "Let's Wait Awhile"—peaked in the top five of the U.S. Billboard Hot 100 singles chart. The feat made Jackson the first female artist to have five top-five hits from one album on the Billboard Hot 100 chart; "When I Think of You" became the singer's first number-one hit. Control also set a record for the longest continuous run of charting singles on the Hot 100, with 65 consecutive weeks. Music videos created to promote the album's singles showcased her dancing ability and became a catalyst for MTV's evolving demographics. The album remained on the Billboard 200 chart for over two years. It has been certified five times platinum by the Recording Industry Association of America (RIAA) and has sold more than 10 million copies worldwide.

Control received several accolades, including a nomination for the Grammy Award for Album of the Year and a Producer of the Year, Non-Classical win for Jam and Lewis in 1987. It is listed by the National Association of Recording Merchandisers and the Rock and Roll Hall of Fame as one of the 200 Definitive Albums of All Time and has been included in several publications' "best of" album lists. In 2016, it was selected for exhibition in the National Museum of African American History and Culture (NMAAHC).

== Background ==
Joseph Jackson, patriarch of the Jackson family of musicians, was known for managing the careers of all nine of his children, most notably the successful career of The Jackson 5. After arranging a recording contract with A&M in 1982 for a then-15-year-old Janet, he oversaw the entire production of her debut album, Janet Jackson, and its follow-up, Dream Street (1984); the latter was written and produced by her brother Marlon and Jesse Johnson. Best known as a television actress, she was initially reluctant to begin a recording career. She said, "I was coming off of a TV show that I absolutely hated doing, Fame. I didn't want to do [the first record, Janet Jackson]. I wanted to go to college. But I did it for my father ..." and elaborated that she was often in conflict with her producers. Amid her professional struggles, she rebelled against her family's wishes by marrying James DeBarge of the family recording group DeBarge in 1984. The Jacksons disapproved of the relationship, citing DeBarge's immaturity and substance abuse. Jackson left her husband in January 1985 and was granted an annulment later that year.

Jackson subsequently fired her father as her manager and hired John McClain, then A&M Records' senior vice president of artists and repertoire and general manager. Commenting on the decision, she said, "I just wanted to get out of the house, get out from under my father, which was one of the most difficult things that I had to do, telling him that I didn't want to work with him again." Joseph Jackson resented John McClain for what he saw as an underhanded attempt to steal his daughter's career out from under him, stating, "I've worked hard for my family. The problem comes, though, when others come in behind you and try to steal them away. The wheels have already been set for Janet Jackson. Anyone who jumps on now will be getting a free ride." McClain responded, "I'm not trying to pimp Janet Jackson or steal her away from her father." He subsequently introduced her to the songwriting/production duo of James "Jimmy Jam" Harris III and Terry Lewis, former Prince associates and ex-members of The Time.

== Composition and production ==
When Jam and Lewis agreed to produce Jackson's third studio album, they wanted to appeal primarily to the African American community while also achieving crossover success on the pop music charts. Jam commented in an interview with Rolling Stone magazine, "We wanted to do an album that would be in every black home in America ... we were going for the black album of all time." Before their association with Jackson, Jam and Lewis had planned to record an album with tracks they wrote for Sharon Bryant, but she found their lyrics and sound to be too "rambunctious". The duo presented the same set of recordings to Jackson, who gave her input and took co-writing and co-production credits for the album. Jam and Lewis recalled that to collaborate with Jackson on the material, they spent the first week simply getting to know her. Lewis explained, "We got into her head. We saw what she was capable of, what she wanted to say, where she wanted to be, what she wanted to be. We put together some songs to fit her as we saw her, as she revealed herself to us. It was as simple as that."

"Nasty"
Jackson's second single, "Nasty", is one of the primary examples that helped inspire the new jack swing sound, mixing funk with contemporary R&B and a triplet swing beat. The song's lyrics recount Jackson's encounter with sexual harassment.

For the song "What Have You Done for Me Lately", which was originally written for one of Jam and Lewis's own records, the lyrics were rewritten to convey Jackson's feelings about her recent annulment from James DeBarge. The song was chosen as the lead single for Control, as Jam and Lewis felt it best represented Jackson's outlook on life. "Nasty", which in Jackson's opinion was the most innovative song on the album, was inspired by her experience with street harassment in Minneapolis by a group of men outside the hotel where she was staying during the recording of Control. She recalled, "They were emotionally abusive. Sexually threatening. Instead of running to Jimmy or Terry for protection, I took a stand. I backed them down. That's how songs like 'Nasty' and 'What Have You Done for Me Lately' were born, out of a sense of self-defense." Jimmy Jam wrote and played the keyboard arrangement, with Jackson playing the accompaniment. Jackson, Jam, and Lewis sang background vocals. The distinctive triplet swing beat of the song was developed by Jam on an Ensoniq Mirage keyboard. "Let's Wait Awhile" was centered on safe sex and abstinence, a subject of significant social commentary at the time. Jam commented that songwriters commonly draw lyrical inspiration from current events and that the AIDS pandemic had raised awareness about sexually transmitted diseases. He commented, "The theme of the song ('Let's Wait Awhile') was Janet's idea. She's not a preachy person. She's not telling people how to live their lives. All she's doing is offering an opinion."

Although Joseph Jackson initially demanded that his daughter's new album be recorded in Los Angeles so he could keep an eye on her, Jam and Lewis refused. They required the entire album to be produced at their own studio in Minneapolis, Minnesota, "far from the glitter and distractions of Hollywood and the interference of manager-fathers." Jam stated, "We required that they put her in our hands. We had to do it on our turf, with no bodyguards, no star trips and none of Joe Jackson's people hanging around making suggestions." Jackson relocated to Minneapolis to record the album at Flyte Tyme Studios, the Minneapolis studio associated with Flyte Tyme Records, founded by Jimmy Jam and Terry Lewis. "There's a little radiator I used to sit on when we did the Control album," Jackson recalled in 1993. John McClain served as the executive producer.

Jam and Lewis were the recording's primary instrumentalists, playing percussion, piano, and drums, and they also provided background vocals. Jackson accompanied Jam and Lewis on keyboard and took part in composing the arrangements. Stephen Holden of The New York Times observed that the album was a prominent example of the developing relationship with musicians and modern technology, stating "... technology has altered the form, shape, scale and even the meaning of popular music ... The album wasn't created by a studio band, as were most pop-rock albums in the 1960s and '70s, but by the producers and the singer programming mechanized drum and keyboard textures." Jackson's father disapproved of the new material and image on Control, claiming it would never sell. In a cover story for Spin magazine titled "Damn It, Janet: The Battle for Control of Janet Jackson," Joseph was reported as saying, "[i]f Janet listens to me, she'll be as big as Michael." She and McClain disregarded his objections. Commenting on the final product, Jackson stated: "It's aggressive, cocky, very forward. It expresses exactly who I am and how I feel. I've taken control of my own life. This time I'm gonna do it my way."

== Album cover ==
Fashion photographer and illustrator Tony Viramontes created the album's stylized cover and the singles "Nasty" and "Control". Jackson said of Viramontes, "He was very creative, and I believe one day his work will be iconic. He was such a joy to work with. I miss him." Author Dean Rhys Morgan in Bold, Beautiful and Damned: The World of Fashion Illustrator Tony Viramontes discusses how Jackson was "transformed from a former child star into an assured, fashion-forward figure with her trendsetting big hair and severe all-black ensemble. Until this point, Jackson had been more a reflection than pioneer, more interpreter than innovator. This album was all about Janet and who she wanted to be." Alexander Fury wrote in The Independent, "the artwork created with 1980s illustrator Tony Viramontes for Control stands the test of time."

== Release and promotion ==
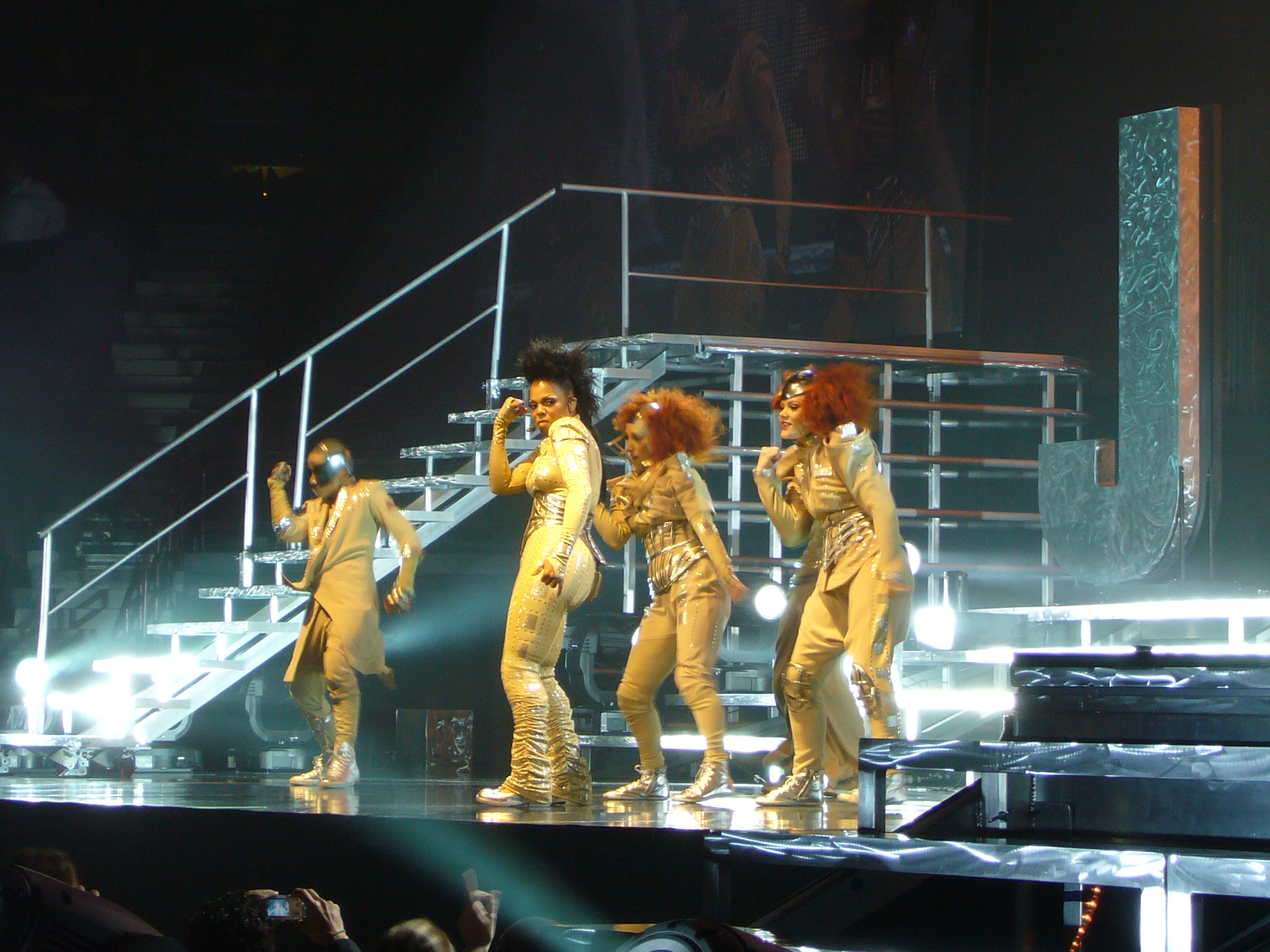
Jackson performing a medley of the album's singles, "The Pleasure Principle", "Control" and "What Have You Done for Me Lately", during the Rock Witchu Tour in 2008.

Although A&M did not consider a full concert tour to promote the album, the label funded a three-week promotional tour across the United States in 13 cities following its release. In addition to the studio release, a remix album, Control: The Remixes, was released in select countries in November 1987. Jackson's lyrical expression has been cited as one of the key elements of the album's success. Author Dave Marsh in The Heart of Rock & Soul: The 1001 Greatest Singles Ever Made (1999) comments: "Certainly, Janet must have written her own lyrics, which went after men, particularly thinly disguised stand-ins for her father and former husband—more venomously than a male songwriter would have dared. Control, the resulting album, was one of the best-sellers of 1986–1987, producing five hit singles."

Jesus Garber, then-director of A&M's black music marketing and promotion, noted that in addition to crossover promotion from black to pop music charts, music videos were used to launch Jackson into superstardom. Eric Henderson of Slant Magazine credits the release of Control as "the birth of Janet the music video star, as six of the nine tracks were turned into popular videos that effectively announced her as the queen of the production dance number." Henderson commented that Jackson's dancing ability, trained by a then-unknown Paula Abdul, helped propel her further into stardom. Charlie Minor, then-senior vice president of promotion for A&M stated: "The videos completed the image of Janet Jackson with the buyer ... They gave her a face, dance, action identity with the songs, and a visual identity as a rock 'n' roll star." Jonathan Cohen of Billboard magazine commented "[Jackson's] accessible sound and spectacularly choreographed videos were irresistible to MTV, and helped the channel evolve from rock programming to a broader, beat-driven musical mix." The video for "Nasty" received three nominations for the fifth annual 1987 MTV Video Music Awards, winning Best Choreography for Paula Abdul.

== Commercial performance ==
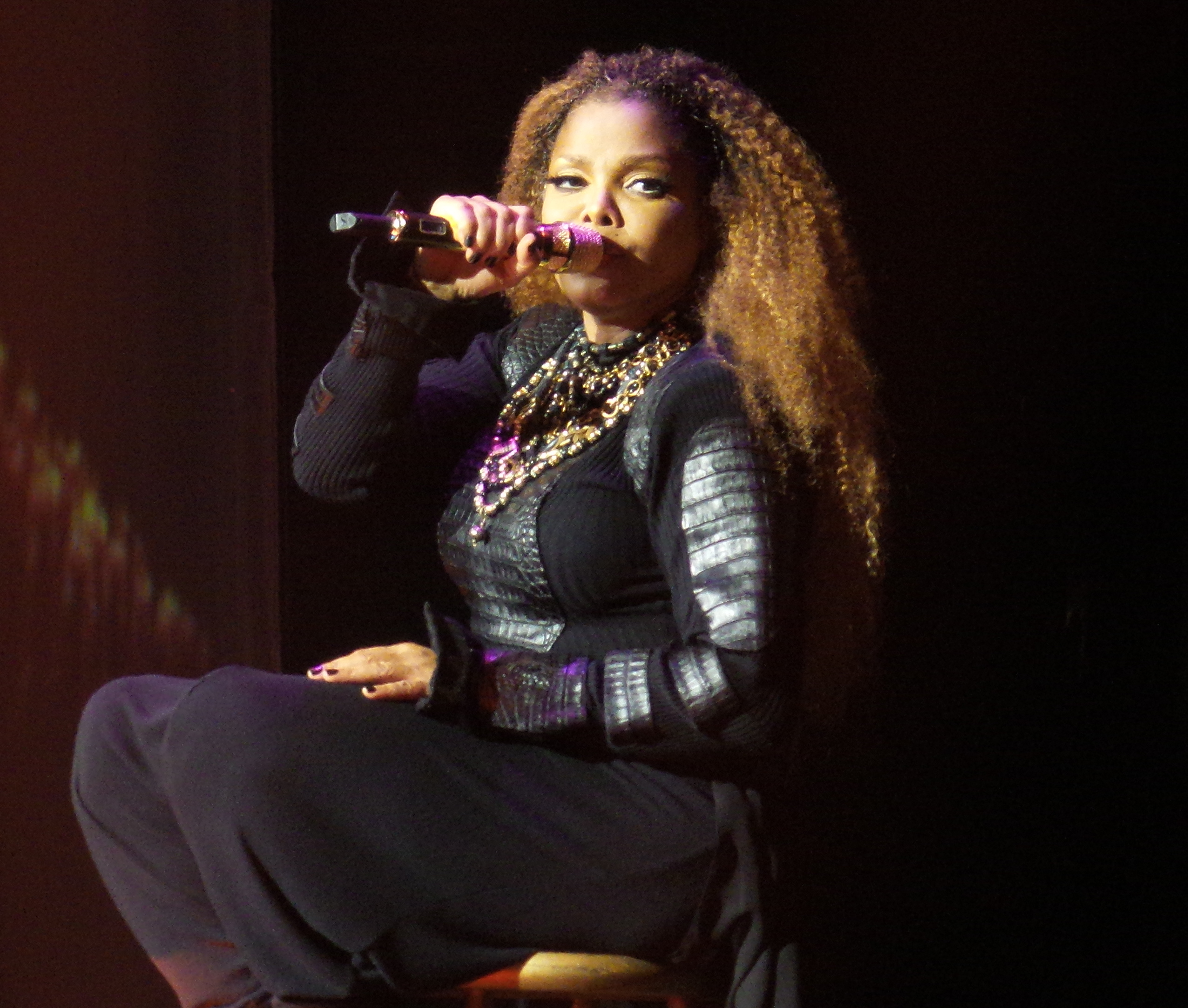
Jackson singing "Let's Wait Awhile" during her 2015–16 Unbreakable World Tour.

Control debuted at number 84 on the Billboard 200 on March 8, 1986, and at number 26 on the Top R&B/Black Albums on March 1, 1986. After twenty weeks, it topped the Billboard 200 and the Top R&B/Black Albums chart, selling 250,000 copies in a single week, a record for an album by a female artist. The Recording Industry Association of America (RIAA) first certified Control gold in April 1986, denoting 500,000 units shipped within the United States. Two months later, in June 1986, the album was RIAA certified platinum, denoting 1 million units shipped. Three years later, Control was RIAA certified fivefold platinum in October 1989. By 1990, Control had sold 5 million copies in the United States and as of December 2009, the album has sold 496,000 copies in the U.S. since 1991 according to Nielsen SoundScan, which does not count albums sold through clubs like the BMG Music, where she sold 883,000. Combined, it has sold over 6,379,000 copies in the U.S. Since its debut, Control has sold over 10 million copies worldwide.

The album's lead single, "What Have You Done for Me Lately", peaked at number four on the Billboard Hot 100 singles chart and at number one on the Hot Black Singles chart. The single was certified gold by the RIAA in November 1990. The song was compared favorably to similar recordings of female empowerment released by black women, such as "New Attitude" by Patti LaBelle, "Better Be Good to Me" by Tina Turner, and "Sisters Are Doin' It for Themselves" by The Eurythmics and Aretha Franklin. Oprah Winfrey commented: "What you're seeing in all the areas of arts and entertainment is black women internalizing the idea of black power and pride ... Black women started listening to their inner cues, rather than society or even the black community's idea of what they are supposed to be and can be." "Nasty", the album's second single, beat "What Have You Done for Me Lately" by one position, peaking at number three on the Hot 100 and at number one on the Hot Black Singles chart. It was certified gold in November 1990. Critic Jon Bream noted "the songwriters have slyly juxtaposed a nasty-sounding groove and the repetition of the word 'nasty' with a subtle antinasty message."

"When I Think of You" reached number one on the Hot 100, becoming Jackson's first single to top the chart, and was certified gold in November 1990. The album's fourth single and title track, "Control", reached its peak position at number five on the Hot 100 and at number one on the Hot Black Singles chart, later certified gold by the RIAA in November 1990. "Let's Wait Awhile" reached number two on the Hot 100 and number one on the Hot Black Singles chart. Clarence Page of the Chicago Tribune commented in a similar vein as "Nasty", the ballad "throw[s] cold water on the passions of young love 'before we go too far'." Unlike the preceding singles, "The Pleasure Principle" did not reach within the top five on the Hot 100, instead peaking at number fourteen. It did, however, become Jackson's fifth number one single on the Hot Black Singles chart. Each of the album's singles excluding "Let's Wait Awhile" peaked in the top five of the Billboard Club Play Singles. "Funny How Time Flies (When You're Having Fun)" was not released as a commercial single in the United States. It peaked at number 59 on the UK Singles Chart.

== Critical reception ==
Professional ratings
Review scores
Source	Rating
AllMusic	5/5 stars
Christgau's Record Guide	B
Encyclopedia of Popular Music	4/5 stars
The Guardian	5/5 stars
Paste	8.7/10
The Rolling Stone Album Guide	4/5 stars
Slant Magazine	4/5 stars
Tom Hull – on the Web	B+

Upon its release, the album received widespread critical acclaim. Rolling Stone's Rob Hoerburger commented that the "sharp-tongued" Janet Jackson is "more concerned with identity than with playlists", as Control declares she is no longer the Jacksons' baby sister. Hoerburger wrote that tracks such as "Nasty" and "What Have You Done for Me Lately" erased the former "pop-ingénue image" of Jackson's first two albums, and that "Control is a better album than Diana Ross has made in five years and puts Janet in a position similar to the young Donna Summer's—unwilling to accept novelty status and taking her own steps to rise above it." Steven Ivory of Billboard wrote "[v]ocally, Jackson is more aggressive than ever. Indeed, her exhibition of sass and funkiness is certainly more provocative" compared with her previous work. NME wrote: "Jackson has gone a long way in shaking off the experience of being a shadow Jackson child. She is an artist in her own right." Newsweek stated "[i]n an era of big-voiced pop-soul divas ... her current hit album, is taut, funky, hard as nails, an alternative to sentimental balladry and opulent arrangements of Patti LaBelle and Whitney Houston." In The Village Voice, Robert Christgau "scoffed at Janet's claims of autonomy", but praised Jam and Lewis's beats as "their deepest ever" while finding Jackson's contribution entertaining enough. Los Angeles Times critic Connie Johnson wrote: "Though still a teen-ager, this singer's stance is remarkably nervy and mature. She has a snotty sort of assurance that permeates several cuts, plus the musical muscle to back it up." Jon Pareles of The New York Times noted that Control takes obvious influence from Prince, describing "[t]he album's pacing, its clipped vocal lines—even the spoken introduction that starts things off" as pure Minneapolis sound; he added "[b]ut where the Prince style is usually connected with heavy-breathing come-ons, Miss Jackson is cheerfully standoffish."

For the 29th Annual Grammy Awards, Control received four nominations: Album of the Year, Best R&B Song for "What Have You Done for Me Lately", Best Female R&B Vocal Performance, and Non-Classical Producer of the Year for Jimmy Jam and Terry Lewis. Jam and Lewis won Producer of the Year. The album earned a record-breaking 12 nominations from the American Music Awards, winning four. Jackson also won three Soul Train Music Awards and six Billboard Music Awards.

Later reviews remained favorable. Eric Henderson of Slant Magazine argued that the misconception that Control is Jackson's debut album only confirmed the album as the "quintessential statement on personal and artistic self-actualization" that it set out to accomplish. Henderson claimed critics who judged Jackson harshly for her thin voice "somehow missed the explosive 'gimme a beat' vocal pyrotechnics she unleashes all over "Nasty" ... Or that they completely dismissed how perfect her tremulous hesitance fits into the abstinence anthem "Let's Wait Awhile." However, Henderson also wrote that the "Jam-Lewis formula wasn't completely infallible" as "You Can Be Mine" and "Funny How Time Flies (When You're Having Fun)", were two of the album's less impressive misfires. William Ruhlmann of AllMusic wrote that Jackson "came across as an aggressive, independent woman", but asserted that the album's true value lies in the production talents of Jimmy Jam and Terry Lewis. In The New Rolling Stone Album Guide (2004), Laura Sinagra said that on Control, "Jam and Lewis perfected their melodic, full-blown funk attack", while Jackson "filled each track with a breathy believability" with vocal performances that ranged from yearning to seductive. In 2020, Rolling Stone ranked Control number 111 on the reboot of its list of The 500 Greatest Albums of All Time.

== Accolades ==
Organization	Country	Accolade	Year	Source
Billboard Year-End Charts	United States	Top Black Artist, Top Black Singles Artist, Top Dance Club Play Artist, Top Dance Sales Artist, Top Pop Singles Artist, Top Pop Singles Artist, Female	1986	
Grammy Awards	United States	Producer of the Year, Non-Classical	1987	
American Music Awards	United States	Favorite Soul/R&B Single ("Nasty"), Favorite Soul/R&B Female Video Artist	1987	
Soul Train Music Awards	United States	Best Music Video ("What Have You Done for Me Lately"), Album of the Year, Female (Control)	1987	
MTV Video Music Awards	United States	Best Choreography ("Nasty")	1987	
American Music Awards	United States	Favorite Soul/R&B Video ("When I Think of You"), Favorite Pop/Rock Video ("When I Think of You")	1988	
Soul Train Music Awards	United States	Best Music Video ("Control")	1988	
MTV Video Music Awards	United States	Best Choreography ("The Pleasure Principle")	1988	
Rolling Stone	United States	"Rolling Stone's 100 Best Albums of the Eighties" (ranked 28)	1989	
Vibe	United States	"100 Essential Albums of the 20th Century" (unranked)	1999	
Q	United Kingdom	"100 Women Who Rock the World" (ranked 72)	2002	
Slant Magazine	United States	"Vital Pop: 50 Essential Pop Albums" (unranked)	2003	
Slant Magazine	United States	"Best Albums of the '80s" (ranked 31)	2012	
Rock and Roll Hall of Fame	United States	"The Definitive 200: Top 200 Albums of All-Time" (ranked 86)	2007	
The Guardian	United Kingdom	"1000 Albums To Hear Before You Die" (unranked)	2007	
Vibe	United States	"The Unfadeable 51" (unranked)	2008	
Spin	United States	"The 300 Best Albums of the Past 30 Years (1985–2014)" (ranked 234)	2014	
Billboard	United States	"Greatest of All Time Top R&B/Hip-Hop Albums" (ranked 16)	2017	
NPR	United States	"Turning The Tables: The 150 Greatest Albums Made By Women" (ranked 17)	2017	
Pitchfork	United States	"The 200 Best Albums of the 1980s" (ranked 8)	2018	
Cleveland.com	United States	"The 80 greatest albums of the 1980s by Rock Hall Inductees" (ranked 9)	2020	
Rolling Stone	United States	"The 500 Greatest Albums of All Time" (ranked 111)	2020	
Apple Music	United States	"Apple Music 100 Best Albums" (ranked 42)	2024	

== Legacy ==
"Her 1986 album Control is important to the development of R&B for a number of reasons. The primary producers of Control, Jimmy Jam, Terry Lewis, and Jackson herself, crafted a new sound that fuses the rhythmic elements of funk and disco, along with heavy doses of synthesizers, percussion, sound effects, and a rap music sensibility."

— Richard J. Ripani, The New Blue Music, 2006

Control is widely considered to be the breakthrough in Jackson's career, establishing her independence and dominance in the realm of popular music. In The Sex Revolts: Gender, Rebellion, and Rock'n'roll (1996) author Simon Reynolds wrote that "Janet Jackson became a superstar with the immaculately designed soft-core feminism of Control." Jet magazine commented that although the Jackson family's musical legacy had given her an opportunity to tap into an international audience, Control was the turning point at which "her career took off and she became a bona fide superstar. Control showcased Janet as a person who was firmly and finally in control of her own life." Dennis Hunt of the Los Angeles Times wrote: "Previously, she had recorded two unsophisticated, kiddie soul albums. If you listened carefully to that kid stuff, there was a grown-up singer there somewhere struggling to get out. [Jimmy Jam and Terry Lewis] liberated the real Janet Jackson."

Lyrically, Jackson's album is said to exhibit a "politically driven feminist" message, as stated by Lilly Goren in You've Come A Long Way, Baby: Women, Politics, and Popular Culture (2009). Musically, according to Rickey Vincent, author of Funk: The Music, The People, and The Rhythm of The One (1996), Jam and Lewis's collaboration with her is said to be one of the high points of the 1980s, as they redefined dance music by mixing a youthful sound with industrial-strength beats. As documented by musicologist Richard J. Ripani, author of The New Blue Music: Changes in Rhythm & Blues, 1950–1999 (2006), Control is regarded as one of the most influential albums in the history of rhythm and blues and the first album to bridge the gap between R&B and rap music. Its success in both the mainstream R&B and pop music charts "led to the incorporation of many of the stylistic traits of rap over the next few years, and Janet Jackson was to continue to be one of the leaders in that development." Furthermore, the album's second single "Nasty" has been credited with influencing the new jack swing genre, pioneered by Teddy Riley. Laura Sinagra in The New Rolling Stone Album Guide wrote that the album impacted popular music with a "blockbuster momentum all its own", while Eric Henderson of Slant Magazine noted Control "was every bit the hit machine that her brother's Thriller was." Additionally, Control made Billboard Hot 100 history having the longest continuous run on the Hot 100 with singles from one album at 65 consecutive weeks, breaking her brother Michael's record by one week; Thriller by comparison charted singles for 64 consecutive weeks. Steve Morse of The Boston Globe commented: "All things considered, 1986 was a stellar year for the black female vocalist—the best, in fact, since the disco era of a decade back ... Black music crossed over to the pop charts in dramatic fashion, with Whitney Houston, Patti LaBelle and Janet Jackson each having No. 1 albums."

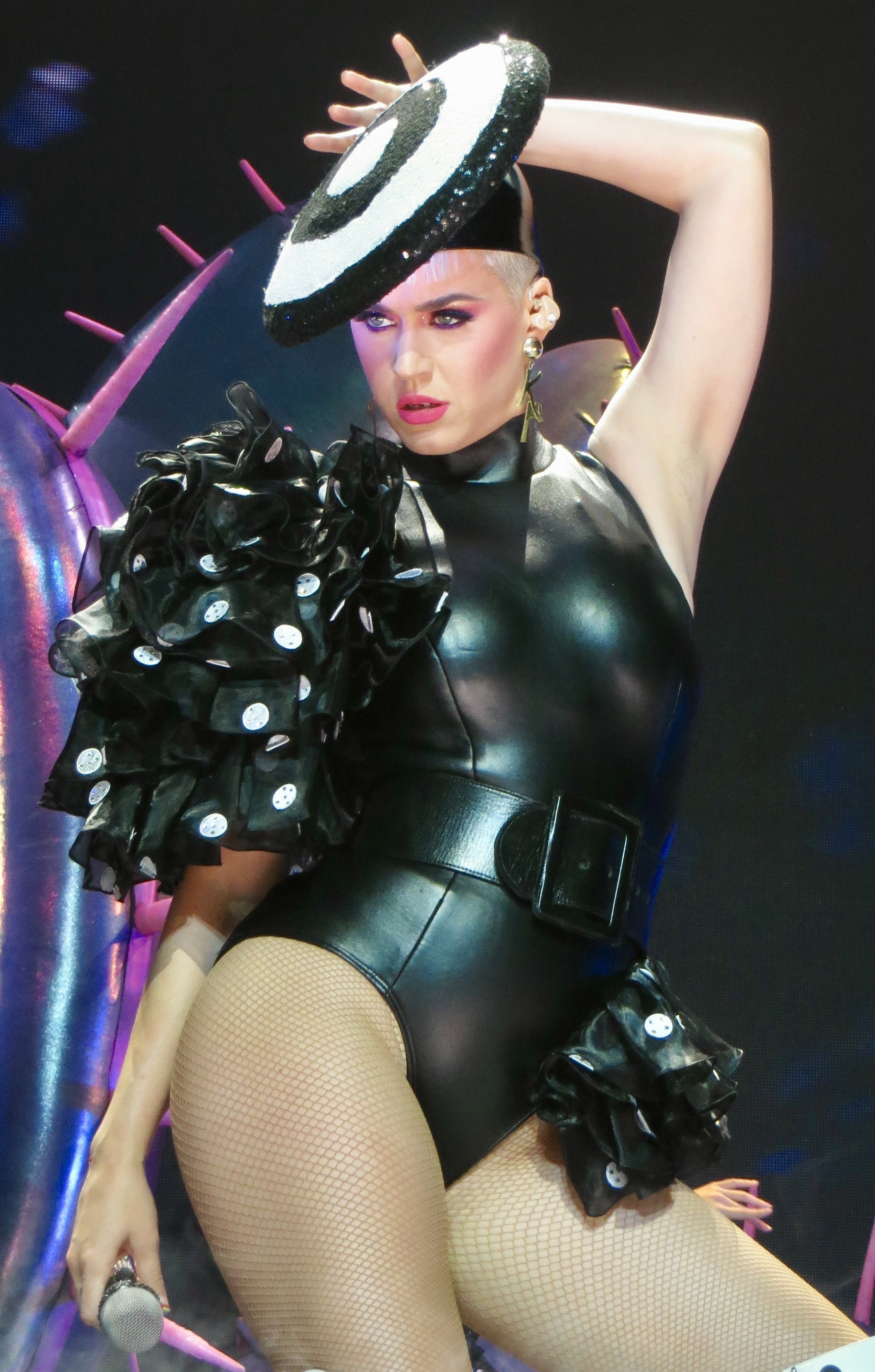
Katy Perry performing "What Have You Done for Me Lately" during Witness: The Tour at Madison Square Garden

In addition to stepping out of the Jackson family shadow, Control established Jackson as one of the pre-eminent female artists of popular music, rivaling fellow pop star Madonna, as critics began to acknowledge their influence on the record industry and younger artists. Continuum Encyclopedia of Popular Music of the World Volume 8: Genres: North America (2012) documents that both women redefined house music, repackaging it "as part of a global metropolitan pop aesthetic." Regarding singles marketing, Paul Grein of Billboard reported: "10 or 20 years ago you would have had two singles from an album at the most. Now we're in an era where Madonna is on her fifth single from the album True Blue and Janet Jackson is on her sixth from the LP Control." Jackson later became the first female artist to produce six top 40 hits on the Billboard Hot 100 from a single album. Los Angeles Times writer Paul Grein wrote an article titled "The influence of Madonna and Janet Jackson", reporting Debbie Gibson's manager Doug Breitbart claimed "Madonna has brought back a really strong, melodic component to pop music", while Teen Beat editor Maggie Murphy remarked "Janet Jackson may have started this more than anyone else." Anthony DeCurtis, author of Present Tense: Rock & Roll and Culture (1992) wrote that "Madonna and Janet Jackson have produced videos that explore the female gaze," and described Jackson's music video for "Nasty" as feminist theory on film that deconstructs the objectification of women. Laura Sinagra documented that within two years of the release of Control, "a new crop of female singers (such as Paula Abdul and Karyn White) were charged with imitating Janet." Anthony DeCurtis of Rolling Stone remarked: "Control—with its quintuple-platinum sales and string of hit singles—established" a then-twenty-year-old Jackson "as one of the most popular recording artists in the world." The Guardian described the album's release as one of the 50 key events in the history of R&B and hip hop.

Upon the 30th anniversary of the album's release, Julian Kimble of Billboard magazine wrote: "In hindsight, Control is both evolutionary and revolutionary. As Jackson's first album to land atop the Billboard 200, it marked professional and personal breakthroughs. Distancing herself from the immense Jackson family shadow, she created one of the most influential projects across contemporary R&B and pop music. And not only was Jackson's maiden voyage with producers Jimmy Jam and Terry Lewis at the forefront of R&B, pop and hip-hop’s intersection, it birthed a novel sound in the process." Morgan Y. Evans for PopMatters' wrote: "Janet Jackson's Control is worth reconsidering as, perhaps boldly, one of the top three or four pop records of the '80s... It is unquestionably the most coherent and powerful full album statement from any female solo pop artist during much of the '80s, some of Kate Bush's more eccentric triumphs that decade notwithstanding." Kyle Anderson of Entertainment Weekly commented: "The videos from Control were widely aired on MTV, and Janet established herself as an instantly dominant pop figure talked about in the same conversation as Madonna and her older brother Michael." MTV's Meaghan Garvey asserted "it's hard to overstate the significance of Control, whether in terms of the pop landscape, the evolution of the music video as a vessel for promotion and expression, or Top 40 feminist anthems." She also argued "it's important to note that Control's self-actualization anthems were expressions of Black female pride. Control spawned a whopping six videos—great ones, at that—which played an immeasurable role in the shift toward visible Black pop." Gerrick D. Kennedy of Los Angeles Times wrote that Jackson's continued influence was evident in the careers of Rihanna, Beyoncé, Ciara, FKA Twigs and Tinashe in that "all of them take cues from Jackson's blueprint. And all that began with Control." In 2016, a cassette of Control was added to the "Musical Crossroads" exhibition of the National Museum of African American History and Culture (NMAAHC).

== Track listing ==
All tracks written by Janet Jackson and Jimmy Jam and Terry Lewis, except where noted.

Side one
No.	Title	Co-producer(s)	Length
1.	"Control"	Jackson	5:53
2.	"Nasty"	Jackson	4:03
3.	"What Have You Done for Me Lately"	Jackson	4:59
4.	"You Can Be Mine"	Jackson; Jellybean Johnson	5:16

Side two
No.	Title	Writer(s)	Co-producer(s)	Length
5.	"The Pleasure Principle"	Monte Moir	Jackson; Steve Wiese	4:58
6.	"When I Think of You"		Jackson	3:56
7.	"He Doesn't Know I'm Alive"	Spencer Bernard	Jackson; Bernard	3:30
8.	"Let's Wait Awhile"	Harris; Lewis; Jackson; Melanie Andrews		4:37
9.	"Funny How Time Flies (When You're Having Fun)"		Jackson	4:29
Total length:				41:48

Japanese first pressing edition
No.	Title	Writer(s)	Producer(s)	Length
5.	"Start Anew"	Ralph McCarthy; Yuji Toriyama	30th Music	4:19
6.	"The Pleasure Principle"			4:58
7.	"When I Think of You"			3:56
8.	"He Doesn't Know I'm Alive"			3:30
9.	"Let's Wait Awhile"			4:37
10.	"Funny How Time Flies (When You're Having Fun)"			4:29
Total length:				46:07

== Personnel ==
- Janet Jackson – background vocals, bells, co-producer, keyboards, lead vocals, piano, producer, rhythm arrangements, synthesizers, vocal arrangements
- Melanie Andrews – background vocals, vocal arrangements
- Troy Anthony – saxophone
- Lyle Baker – project coordinator
- Chuck Beeson – art direction
- Jerome Benton – vocals
- Spencer Bernard – co-producer, guitar, rhythm arrangements, synthesizers, vocal arrangements
- Geoff Bouchieiz – guitar
- Mark Cardenas – synthesizers
- Roger Dumas – drums, programming
- Steve Hodge – assistant engineer, mixing, recording engineer
- Jimmy Jam – assistant engineer, background vocals, drums, keyboards, percussion, piano, producer, programming, rhythm arrangements, sampling, synthesizers, vocal arrangements, vocals
- Jellybean Johnson – co-producer, guitar, rhythm arrangements, vocals
- Lisa Keith – background vocals, vocal arrangements
- Terry Lewis – assistant engineer, background vocals, bass, drums, guitar, percussion, producer, programming, recording engineer, rhythm arrangements, vocal arrangements, vocals
- John McClain – executive producer
- Monte Moir – assistant engineer, drums, guitar, producer, programming, rhythm arrangements, synthesizers, vocal arrangements
- Melanie Nissen – art direction, design
- O'Nicholas Raths – acoustic and 12-string guitar
- David Rivkin – recording engineer
- Gwendolyn Traylor – background vocals
- Tony Viramontes – photography
- Hami Wave – background vocals
- Steve Weise – assistant engineer, co-producer, mixing, recording engineer

== Charts ==
=== Weekly charts ===
Chart (1986–89)	Peak position
Australia (Kent Music Report)	25
Canada Top Albums/CDs (RPM)	11
Dutch Albums (Album Top 100)	7
Dutch Albums (Stichting Nederlandse)	5
European Albums (Top 100)	24
German Albums (Offizielle Top 100)	36
Japanese Albums (Oricon)	57
New Zealand Albums (RMNZ)	5
South African Albums (RISA)	1
Swedish Albums (Sverigetopplistan)	47
Swiss Albums (Schweizer Hitparade)	28
UK Albums (Official Charts)	8
US Billboard 200	1
US Top R&B/Hip-Hop Albums (Billboard)	1

=== Year-end charts ===
Chart (1986)	Position
Australian Albums (Kent Music Report)	87
Canada Top Albums/CDs (RPM)	34
Dutch Albums (Album Top 100)	20
European Top 100 Albums (Music & Media)	63
New Zealand Albums (RMNZ)	39
US Billboard 200	6
US Top R&B/Hip-Hop Albums (Billboard)	2
Chart (1987)	Position
Canada Top Albums/CDs (RPM)	46
Dutch Albums (Album Top 100)	42
European Top 100 Albums (Music & Media)	87
UK Albums (OCC)	60
US Billboard 200	5
US Top R&B/Hip-Hop Albums (Billboard)	5

=== All-time chart ===
Chart	Position
US Billboard 200	72

== Certifications ==
Region	Certification	Certified units/sales
Canada (Music Canada)	Platinum	100,000^{^}
Netherlands (NVPI)	Platinum	100,000^{^}
New Zealand (RMNZ)	Gold	7,500^{^}
United Kingdom (BPI)	Platinum	324,000
United States (RIAA)	5× Platinum	6,379,000
Summaries
Worldwide	—	10,000,000
^{^} Shipments figures based on certification alone.

== See also ==
- List of best-selling albums by women

== Notes ==
a: Originally titled "Top R&B/Black Albums", the chart is now known as "Top R&B/Hip-Hop Albums"
b: Formerly titled "Hot Black Singles chart", the chart is now known as "Hot R&B/Hip-Hop Songs"
c: Originally titled "Club Play Singles", the chart is now known as "Dance Club Songs"
d: By 1990, Control had sold 5 million copies in the United States. As of December 2009, the album had sold 496,000 copies in the US since 1991, according to Nielsen SoundScan, which does not count albums sold through clubs like the BMG Music Club, where she sold 883,000. Combined, the album has sold over 6,379,000 copies in the US.
