= N.E. Heart Break (song) =

1989 single by New Edition

Single by New Edition

from the album Heart Break
- Released: June 16, 1989
- Recorded: 1987–1988; Flyte Time Studios (Edina, Minnesota)
- Genre: R&B, new jack swing
- Label: MCA
- Songwriters: James Harris, Terry Lewis
- Producers: Jimmy Jam and Terry Lewis, Jellybean Johnson

New Edition singles chronology
"Crucial" (1989)	"N.E. Heart Break" (1989)	"Hit Me Off" (1996)

Music video
- "N.E. Heart Break" on YouTube

"N.E. Heart Break" is a song performed by American R&B quintet New Edition. The song serves as the fifth and final single from their sixth studio album Heart Break (1988).

"N.E. Heart Break" peaked at number 13 on the Billboard R&B singles chart. The music video for the song depicts the group members riding mopeds after finishing their Heart Break tour. The music video featured cameos from Malcolm Jamal Warner (who also directed the video), Heavy D & The Boyz (The group's labelmate), Shanice Wilson, The Boys, Robert Townsend, Rob Stone, and Brooke Payne, who also appeared in the "If It Isn't Love" video. The version of the song featured in the music video is the single version of the Extended Club remix, rather than the one featured on the studio album.

== Personnel ==
- Ronnie DeVoe: lead vocals and background vocals
- Ricky Bell: lead vocals and background vocals
- Michael Bivins: background vocals, rap
- Ralph Tresvant: lead vocals & background vocals
- Johnny Gill: lead vocals and background vocals
