= Dancin' (Guy song) =

Single by Guy

from the album Guy III
- Released: October 30, 1999
- Genre: R&B
- Length: 4:08
- Label: MCA
- Songwriters: Gregory Silver (G-Wise), Delvis Damon, Edward Ferrell, Darren Lighty, Balewa Muhammad, Teddy Riley
- Producers: Eddie F, Darren Lighty, Gregory Silver (G-Wise), Teddy Riley

Guy singles chronology
"Let's Stay Together" (1992)	"Dancin'" (1999)	"Why You Wanna Keep Me from My Baby" (2000)

"Dancin'" is a song by American R&B group Guy recorded for their third studio album Guy III (2000). The song was released as the album's debut single in October 1999.

Although the group was long past their late-1980s/early-1990s heyday at this point, "Dancin'" would become Guy's highest-charting single on the Billboard Hot 100 (and their only song to crack the top 40) to date, reaching #19 on that chart. It was also a top 5 hit on the R&B chart.

== Track listing ==
12", CD, Maxi-Single, Vinyl

1. "Dancin'" - 4:11
2. "Dancin'" (Instrumental) - 4:11
3. "Dancin'" (Acapella) - 4:11

== Charts ==
=== Weekly charts ===
Chart (1999–2000)	Peak position
US Billboard Hot 100	19
US Hot R&B/Hip-Hop Songs (Billboard)	4
US Rhythmic Airplay (Billboard)	17

=== Year-end charts ===
Chart (2000)	Position
US Hot R&B/Hip-Hop Songs (Billboard)	58
