= Teddy's Jam =

Single by Guy

from the album Guy
- B-side: "Teddy's Jazz"
- Released: 1988
- Genre: New jack swing
- Length: 3:30
- Label: Uptown/MCA
- Songwriters: Aaron Hall, Teddy Riley, Timmy Gatling, Gene Griffin
- Producers: Gene Griffin, Teddy Riley

Guy singles chronology
| "Groove Me" (1988) | "Teddy's Jam" (1988) | "I Like" (1989) |

"Teddy's Jam" is an instrumental by American R&B group Guy, recorded for their debut studio album Guy (1988). The song was released as the album's third single in 1988.

== Track listing ==
=== 12", Vinyl (Promo) ===
1. "Teddy's Jam" (Extended Version)
2. "Teddy's Jam" (Bonus Beat)
3. "Teddy's Jam" (Radio Edit)
4. "Teddy's Jam" (Hype Mix)
5. "Teddy's Jazz"

=== 12", Vinyl ===
1. "Teddy's Jam" (Extended Version) - 7:50
2. "Teddy's Jam" (Club Mix) - 4:36
3. "Teddy's Jazz" - 4:45

== Personnel ==
- editing – Greg Royal
- mixing – Timmy Regisford
- production – Gene Griffin, Teddy Riley
- remixing – Gene Griffin, Teddy Riley

== Charts ==
| Chart (1988) | Peak position |
|---|---|
| U.S. Dance Music/Club Play Singles | 25 |
| U.S. Hot Dance Music/Maxi-Singles Sales | 8 |
| U.S. Hot R&B/Hip-Hop Singles & Tracks | 5 |
