= Guy (Guy album) =

Studio album by Guy
- Released: June 14, 1988
- Recorded: October 1987 – March 1988
- Studios: Chung King; Sound Works; Unique (New York City, New York); Hillside (Englewood, New Jersey); Quantum (Jersey City, New Jersey)
- Genre: New jack swing
- Length: 45:08
- Labels: Uptown; Geffen (2007 reissue)
- Producers: Gene Griffin; Teddy Riley

Guy chronology
Guy (1988)	The Future (1990)

Singles from Guy
- 1. "'Round and 'Round (Merry Go 'Round of Love)" Released: April 12, 1988; 2. "Groove Me" Released: May 31, 1988; 3. "Teddy's Jam" Released: September 21, 1988; 4. "I Like" Released: February 24, 1989; 5. "Spend the Night" Released: August 1, 1989

Guy is the debut studio album by American R&B band Guy, released on June 14, 1988, by Uptown Records. It was produced by group member Teddy Riley and manager Gene Griffin. The album peaked at number 27 on the Billboard 200 chart. In July 1994, it was certified double platinum by the Recording Industry Association of America, for shipments of two million copies in the United States. In 2007, to commemorate the 20th anniversary of the album, Geffen Records reissued the recording complete with a remastered version of the original album and a second CD of remixes.

== Background ==
The origins of Guy came about when Aaron Hall and Timmy Gatling worked at the same clothing store, Abraham & Straus in New York. Riley was introduced to Hall by way of Gatling and the three then decided to form a group. Riley and Gatling were in a group prior to forming Guy called Kids At Work. Producer and manager Gene Griffin introduced them to Uptown Records founder Andre Harrell, who immediately signed the trio. After they were signed, they moved to Washington, D.C. to live with Griffin. However, things went south as Griffin and Gatling fought constantly during the recording of the album. Gatling then left the group and was replaced by Aaron's younger brother Damion Hall. The reasons for Gatling's departure from the group centered on contractual and personal issues. He remains credited on the album and he earned royalties for his contributions.

== Recording ==
The album was recorded at several studios in New York—Chung King Studios, Sound Works Studios, and Unique Studios in New York City, Hillside Studios in Englewood, and Quantum Studios, Jersey City. The recording sessions were engineered by Tony Bennett's son Dae Bennett and Dave Kowalski. The album was mixed by Timmy Regisford, who would work with Riley on a number of projects over the next few years.

Guy was initially recorded at the house of Riley's mother. The reason for it was because the group had no money to record like they wanted in a professional studio. Although they did get around to recording in a professional setting, in the end, they used most of the vocals recorded from home because Riley felt they sounded better. One of the songs on the album- "You Can Call Me Crazy"- was originally intended for singer Al B. Sure! for his debut album In Effect Mode. Griffin took the song back as he felt the album needed to be filled. In the end, they decided to keep the song on the album with Sure!'s vocals still on the song.

Another song on the album "Piece of My Love" was the source of an urban legend for a number of years. It was assumed that Hall sang the words "dumb bitch" at the beginning of the track. The rumor was so widespread, it was even referenced by Common in his song "Reminding Me (Of Sef)", the first single from his 1997 album One Day It'll All Make Sense. In a 2000 interview with Vibe Magazine, Riley insisted that it wasn't what Hall was saying, but rather "come on, babe". To further support his claim, he played the master tapes and isolated Hall's vocals to prove otherwise. The album started recording in October 1987 and was completed in March 1988.

A new jack swing album, Guy incorporates hip hop, R&B, and funk styles.

== Commercial performance ==
Guy peaked at twenty-seven on the U.S. Billboard 200 and reached number one on the R&B Albums chart where it remained for five nonconsecutive weeks. The album was certified platinum in March 1989 and double platinum by July 1994. In addition, Guy was the highest charting R&B album on the Billboard Year-End chart for 1989.

== Critical reception ==
Professional ratings
Review scores
Source	Rating
AllMusic	5/5 stars
The Encyclopedia of Popular Music	4/5 stars
Pitchfork	9.0/10
The Village Voice	A−

Robert Christgau of The Village Voice gave the album an "A−" and recommended for listeners to "absorb the beats and focus in on Aaron Hall". He felt that the band "sound[s] like almost arrogantly anonymous light funksters" and found Riley and Hall underwhelming as soul singers, but stated, "where Bobby Brown and Al B. Sure! play the love man falsetto straight, Hall adds depth by straying toward the manly emotionalism of the church. And unlike most light funksters, Riley doesn't aspire to slow ones." John Leland of Spin viewed Guy as exemplary of contemporary new jack swing albums, which he felt all sound "low-budget, without effects or orchestra, but yet they're very sophisticated". Alex Henderson of AllMusic credited the album for doing "more than any other to make [new jack swing] so incredibly popular in the R&B world" and citing it as "one of the most seminal and influential releases of the late '80s".

== Track listing ==
No.	Title	Music	Length
1.	"Groove Me"	Gatling, Hall, Riley	4:34
2.	"Teddy's Jam"	Riley	3:35
3.	"Don't Clap... Just Dance"	Gatling, Hall, Riley	5:03
4.	"You Can Call Me Crazy"	Gatling, Riley	4:06
5.	"Piece of My Love"	Gatling, Hall, Riley	5:15
6.	"I Like"	Gatling, Hall, Riley	4:54
7.	"'Round and 'Round (Merry Go 'Round of Love)"	Hall, Riley, Griffin	4:17
8.	"Spend the Night"	Gatling, Hall, Riley	4:26
9.	"Goodbye Love"	Gatling, Hall, Riley	5:04
10.	"My Business"	Gatling, Hall, Riley	3:54

== Personnel ==
- Franklin D. – assistant engineer
- Alan Friedman – assistant engineer
- Alan Gregorie – assistant engineer
- Jay Henry – assistant engineer
- Dennis Mitchell – assistant engineer
- Mario Salvati – assistant engineer
- Dawn Thomas – composing
- Dae Bennett – engineer
- Dave Kowalski – engineer
- Guy – executive producer
- Andre Harrell – executive producer
- Timmy Gatling – Composer, vocals, producer
- Timmy Regisford – mixing
- Gene Griffin – vocals, producer, arranger
- Al B Sure – vocals
- Teddy Riley – vocals, producer, arranger, keyboards, drum programming
- Louil Silas, Jr. – remixing
- Aaron Hall – vocals
- Tammy Lucas – background vocals

== Charts ==
=== Weekly charts ===
Chart (1988–1989)	Peak position
US Billboard 200	27
US Top R&B/Hip-Hop Albums (Billboard)	1

=== Year-end charts ===
Chart (1988)	Position
US Top R&B/Hip-Hop Albums (Billboard)	45
Chart (1989)	Position
US Billboard 200	34
US Top R&B/Hip-Hop Albums (Billboard)	1

== Certifications ==
Region	Certification	Certified units/sales
United States (RIAA)	2× Platinum	2,000,000^{^}
^{^} Shipments figures based on certification alone.

== See also ==
- List of number-one R&B albums of 1989 (U.S.)
