= Guy III (album) =

Studio album by Guy
- Released: January 25, 2000
- Recorded: 1998–1999
- Studio: Future (Virginia Beach, Virginia)
- Genre: R&B; soul
- Length: 61:46
- Label: MCA
- Producer: Edward "DJ Eddie F" Ferrell; Aaron Hall; Damion Hall; Wesley Hodges; Darren Lighty; Rich Lightning; Darryl Marshall; Walter "Mucho" Scott; Leon F. Sylvers III; Eric Williams

Guy chronology
| The Future (1990) | Guy III (2000) |

Singles from Guy III
- 1. "Dancin'" Released: October 26, 1999; 2. "Why You Wanna Keep Me from My Baby" Released: March 22, 2000

Guy III is the third studio album by American R&B group Guy, released on January 25, 2000, by MCA Records. The album reached number five on the R&B Albums chart and peaked at number thirteen on the Billboard 200 chart.

== Background ==
The origins of Guy III started as far back as 1995, when the trio reunited to record the song "Tell Me What You Like" for the soundtrack to the Fox television series New York Undercover. The recording prompted the group to record another album. While recording in Trinidad, the album plans came to a halt when lead singer Aaron Hall refused to record the song "No Diggity", which would end up becoming a huge hit for Teddy Riley's second group Blackstreet the following year. The group reunited for a second time in 1999, recording the song "The Best" for the soundtrack to the Will Smith film Wild Wild West.

At the time of its release, not all of the members were on the same page for the release of Guy III. Founding member Teddy Riley remained hopeful that his group Blackstreet would record another album despite the friction between him and group member Chauncey Hannibal. Aaron Hall insisted on recording another solo album, while his brother Damion Hall was interested in an acting career. However, in a 2012 interview with Vibe Magazine, Riley blamed the failure of the album on the label. In the interview, he said:

"We tried to do a Guy reunion album. But I don’t think the record company did the third album any justice. MCA didn’t really get us at that point. And they were promoting us like we were jazz artists. They took us everywhere else, but to our audience. You have to know your demographics for that group. They didn’t get us on BET like they were supposed to. They were trying to get us on VH-1, but they weren’t checking for us. We had our radio record, ‘Dancin’’, that couldn’t get on BET. It was just a failure."

Their reunion turned out to be short-lived. By the time they released the second single "Why You Wanna Keep Me From My Baby", Riley left the group again. Only Aaron and Damion appeared in the video for the song. In an ironic twist on the album, a few of the songs were co-produced by Walter "Mucho" Scott and Daryl "Dezo" Adams. The two men were former members of Basic Black, a group discovered by Riley's former mentor/manager Gene Griffin a decade earlier. Guy initially derided the group as being copycats on the song "Gotta Be A Leader"- a song from Guy's second album The Future.

== Release and reception ==
Professional ratings
Review scores
| Source | Rating |
|---|---|
| AllMusic | 4/5 stars |
| NME | 4/5 stars |

Guy III reached number five on the R&B Albums chart and peaked at number thirteen on the U.S. Billboard 200 chart.

Keith Farley of AllMusic stated that "Guy III equals the extraordinary expectations that any new material from Guy provokes, occasionally exceeding their work in the past."

== Track listing ==
| No. | Title | Writer(s) | Length |
|---|---|---|---|
| 1. | "Intro" | | 2:35 |
| 2. | "We're Comin'" | Wesley Hogges, Teddy Riley, Eric Williams | 3:00 |
| 3. | "Dancin'" | Delvis Damon, Edward Ferrell, Darren Lighty, Balewa Muhammad, Teddy Riley | 4:08 |
| 4. | "Rescue Me" | Daryl Adams, James Brown, Aaron Hall, Betty Jean Newsome, Teddy Riley, Walter Scott, Jamal Smith | 5:58 |
| 5. | "Teddy's Jam III" | Teddy Riley, Roger Troutman, Larry Troutman | 4:48 |
| 6. | "Do It" | Antwone Dickey, Todd Gaither, Teddy Riley | 4:24 |
| 7. | "Why You Wanna Keep Me from My Baby" | Tony Rich, Teddy Riley | 5:01 |
| 8. | "Tellin' Me No" | Kazual, Teddy Riley, Walter Scott | 4:33 |
| 9. | "Not a Day" | Jacore Baptiste, Kandace Love, Teddy Riley | 3:17 |
| 10. | "Love Online" | Ray Hopkins Jr., Teddy Riley, Leon Sylvers III, Leon Sylvers IV, Alston Williams | 5:13 |
| 11. | "Spend Time" | Daryl Adams, Ricardo Brown, Edward Fletcher, Melvin Glover, Reggie Griffin, Teddy Riley, Sylvia Robinson, Walter Scott | 4:39 |
| 12. | "Don't U Miss Me" | Richard Fauntleroy, Julian Gilliam, Joi'e Chancellor, Teddy Riley | 4:20 |
| 13. | "2004" | Tony Rich, Teddy Riley, Vocalist= Jamal Smith | 3:27 |
| 14. | "Fly Away" | Terrell Burnside, Michael "Hype" Edwards, Daryl Marshall, Teddy Riley, Jamal Smith | 3:17 |
| 15. | "Someday" | Aaron Hall, Donny Hathaway, Edward Howard, Teddy Riley | 3:06 |

== Chart history ==
=== Weekly charts ===
| Chart (2000) | Peak position |
|---|---|
| US Billboard 200 | 13 |
| US Top R&B/Hip-Hop Albums (Billboard) | 5 |

=== Year-end charts ===
| Chart (2000) | Position |
|---|---|
| US Top R&B/Hip-Hop Albums (Billboard) | 86 |

== Personnel ==
- art direction – Drew FitzGerald
- assistant engineering – Joe Woods
- design – Drew FitzGerald
- engineering – George Mayers, Julian McBrowne, Teddy Riley, Franz Verna
- executive production – Teddy Riley
- guitar – Richard Williams
- hair stylist – Karim Oarnge
- make-up – Karim Oarnge
- mastering – Herb Powers
- mixing – George Mayers, Julian McBrowne, Teddy Riley, Franz Verna
- photography – Norman Jean Roy
- production – Edward "DJ Eddie F" Ferrell, Aaron Hall, Damion Hall, Wesley Hodges, Darrin Lightly, Rich Lightning, Darryl Marshall, Walter "Mucho" Scott, Leon F. Sylvers III, Eric Williams
- stylist – June Ambrose
- vocals – Joi'e Chancellor, Aaron Hall, Damion Hall, Markell Riley, Teddy Riley
- vocals (background) – Darryl Adams, Terrell Burnside, Delvis Damon, Guy, Aaron Hall, Damion Hall, Kazual, Clifton Lightly III, Veronica McKenzie, Balewa Muhammad, Terrell Phillips, Teddy Riley, Jamal Smith, Leon F. Sylvers III, Eric Williams, Michael Woolard
