= Let's Chill =

1991 single by Guy

Single by Guy

from the album The Future
- Released: February 18, 1991
- Recorded: 1990
- Genre: New jack swing
- Length: 5:23
- Label: MCA
- Songwriters: Bernard Belle, Teddy Riley
- Producer: Teddy Riley

Guy singles chronology
"Wanna Get with U" (1990)	"Let's Chill" (1991)	"Do Me Right" (1991)

"Let's Chill" is a song released by American R&B band Guy from the album The Future. Co-written by Bernard Belle and Teddy Riley, it was released as the second single from the album on February 18, 1991. It reached #41 on the U.S. Billboard Hot 100, #10 on the Hot Dance Singles Sales chart and #3 on the R&B/Hip-hop singles chart; it was the highest-charting single by Guy on the Hot 100 at the time, not to be beat until 1999's "Dancin'".

== Track list ==
Vinyl 12" promo

- Let's Chill (LP Version) – 5:23
- Let's Chill (edit) – 4:31
- Let's Chill (instrumental) – 6:52
- Let's Chill (suite) – 6:53

Vinyl, 12", promo

- Let's Chill (extended remix version) – 7:04
- Let's Chill (The Seduction Soliloguy) – 7:02
- Let's Chill (radio edit) – 4:49
- Let's Chill (chilled suite) – 6:30
- Let's Chill (chilled vocal version) – 6:30
- Let's Chill (Quiet Storm version) – 6:28

CD, maxi–single

- Let's Chill (extended remix version) – 7:04
- Let's Chill (The Seduction Soliloguy) – 7:02
- Let's Chill (chilled vocal version) – 6:30

12", vinyl

- Let's Chill (extended remix version) – 7:04
- Let's Chill (The Seduction Soliloguy) – 7:02
- Let's Chill (chilled vocal version) – 6:30

== Charts ==
=== Weekly charts ===
Chart (1991)	Peak position
US Billboard Hot 100	41
US Hot R&B/Hip-Hop Songs (Billboard)	3

=== Year-end charts ===
Chart (1991)	Position
US Hot R&B/Hip-Hop Songs (Billboard)	69
