= Control: The Remixes =

Remix album by Janet Jackson
- Released: November 6, 1987 (UK)
- Recorded: 1986–1987
- Length: 44:00 (European edition); 53:44 (UK edition); 58:14 (Japanese edition); 75:36 (2019 digital release)
- Label: A&M
- Producers: Jimmy Jam and Terry Lewis; Shep Pettibone

Janet Jackson chronology
Control (1986)	Control: The Remixes (1987)	Janet Jackson's Rhythm Nation 1814 (1989)

Professional ratings
Review scores
Source	Rating
AllMusic	3/5 stars
New Musical Express	1/10

Control: The Remixes (issued as More Control in Japan) is the first remix album by American singer Janet Jackson. Released on November 6, 1987 in the United Kingdom, Europe and Japan only, it contains remixes of singles from Control, following the success of the album. Several of the remixes, notably "When I Think of You" and "Control", were the versions featured in their respective music videos. Most of the remixes were also available as B-sides to the original versions. In 2019, the album was reissued on CD, vinyl and all digital platforms.

== Track listing ==
=== European release ===
CD (396 924-2) / Cassette (396 924-4)
No.	Title	Writer(s)	Remixer(s)	Length
1.	"Control" (video mix)	James Harris III, Terry Lewis, Janet Jackson	Steve Hodge	6:02
2.	"Nasty" (extended)	Harris, Lewis, Jackson		6:00
3.	"Nasty" (Cool Summer Mix Pt. 1)	Harris, Lewis, Jackson	Steve Hodge	7:57
4.	"What Have You Done for Me Lately" (extended mix)	Harris, Lewis, Jackson		7:00
5.	"When I Think of You" (extra beats)	Harris, Lewis, Jackson		2:00
6.	"When I Think of You" (dance mix)	Harris, Lewis, Jackson		6:25
7.	"Control" (a cappella)	Harris, Lewis, Jackson		3:55
8.	"Let's Wait Awhile" (remix)	Harris, Lewis, Jackson, Melanie Andrews		4:30

=== UK release ===
CD (MIXCD 1)
No.	Title	Writer(s)	Remixer(s)	Length
1.	"Control" (video mix)	Harris, Lewis, Jackson	Steve Hodge	6:02
2.	"When I Think of You" (dance mix)	Harris, Lewis, Jackson		6:25
3.	"The Pleasure Principle" (long vocal remix – The Shep Pettibone Mix)	Monte Moir	Shep Pettibone	7:23
4.	"What Have You Done for Me Lately" (extended mix)	Harris, Lewis, Jackson		7:00
5.	"Nasty" (Cool Summer Mix Pt. 2)	Harris, Lewis Jackson		10:09
6.	"Let's Wait Awhile" (remix)	Harris, Lewis, Jackson, Andrews		4:30
7.	"Nasty" (Cool Summer Mix Pt. 1)	Harris, Lewis, Jackson	Steve Hodge	7:57
8.	"The Pleasure Principle" (dub edit – The Shep Pettibone Mix)	Moir	Shep Pettibone	6:58

Cassette (MIXMC 1)
No.	Title	Writer(s)	Remixer(s)	Length
1.	"Control" (video mix)	Harris, Lewis, Jackson	Steve Hodge	6:02
2.	"When I Think of You" (dance mix)	Harris, Lewis, Jackson		6:25
3.	"The Pleasure Principle" (long vocal remix – The Shep Pettibone Mix)	Moir	Shep Pettibone	7:23
4.	"Nasty" (Cool Summer Mix Pt. 1)	Harris, Lewis, Jackson	Steve Hodge	7:57
5.	"What Have You Done for Me Lately" (extended mix)	Harris, Lewis, Jackson		7:00
6.	"Nasty" (Cool Summer Mix Pt. 2)	Harris, Lewis, Jackson		10:09
7.	"Let's Wait Awhile" (remix)	Harris, Lewis, Jackson, Andrews		4:30
8.	"The Pleasure Principle" (dub edit – The Shep Pettibone Mix)	Moir	Shep Pettibone	6:58

Vinyl (MIXLP 1)
No.	Title	Writer(s)	Remixer(s)	Length
1.	"Control" (video mix)	Harris, Lewis, Jackson	Steve Hodge	6:02
2.	"When I Think of You" (dance mix)	Harris, Lewis, Jackson		6:25
3.	"The Pleasure Principle" (long vocal remix – The Shep Pettibone Mix)	Moir	Shep Pettibone	7:23
4.	"What Have You Done for Me Lately" (extended mix)	Harris, Lewis, Jackson		7:00
5.	"Nasty" (Cool Summer Mix Pt. 2)	Harris, Lewis, Jackson		10:09
6.	"Let's Wait Awhile" (remix)	Harris, Lewis, Jackson, Andrews		4:30

=== Japan release (More Control) ===
CD (D32Y3148) / Cassette (28P31075)
No.	Title	Writer(s)	Remixer(s)	Length
1.	"What Have You Done for Me Lately" (extended mix)	Harris, Lewis, Jackson		7:00
2.	"Nasty" (extended mix)	Harris, Lewis, Jackson		6:07
3.	"When I Think of You" (dance mix)	Harris, Lewis, Jackson		6:24
4.	"Control" (extended version)	Harris, Lewis, Jackson		7:34
5.	"What Have You Done for Me Lately" (dub version)	Harris, Lewis, Jackson		6:38
6.	"Nasty" (Cool Summer Mix Pt. 2)	Harris, Lewis, Jackson		10:08
7.	"When I Think of You" (instrumental)	Harris, Lewis, Jackson		3:59
8.	"Control" (video mix)	Harris, Lewis, Jackson	Steve Hodge	6:02
9.	"Let's Wait Awhile" (remix)	Harris, Lewis, Jackson, Andrews		4:30

=== 2019 reissue ===
No.	Title	Writer(s)	Length
1.	"Control" (The Video Mix)	Harris, Lewis, Jackson	6:02
2.	"When I Think of You" (Dance Remix)	Harris, Lewis, Jackson	6:25
3.	"The Pleasure Principle" (Long Vocal Remix – Shep Pettibone Mix)	Moir	7:23
4.	"What Have You Done For Me Lately" (Extended Mix)	Harris, Lewis, Jackson	6:55
5.	"Nasty" (Cool Summer Mix / Pt. 2)	Harris, Lewis, Jackson	10:07
6.	"When I Think of You" (Extra Beats)	Harris, Lewis, Jackson	2:01
7.	"Control" (Extended Version)	Harris, Lewis, Jackson	7:33
8.	"Nasty" (Extended Version)	Harris, Lewis, Jackson	6:04
9.	"Let's Wait Awhile" (Remix)	Harris, Lewis, Jackson, Andrews	4:28
10.	"Nasty" (Cool Summer Mix / Pt. 1)	Harris, Lewis, Jackson	7:56
11.	"The Pleasure Principle" (Dub Edit – The Shep Pettibone Mix)	Moir	6:38
12.	"Control" (A Cappella)	Harris, Lewis, Jackson	3:54

Notes

- "Let's Wait Awhile (Remix)" & "The Pleasure Principle (Dub Edit - The Shep Pettibone Mix)" contain earlier fade outs on the 2019 release.

== Personnel ==
- Melanie Andrews – vocal arrangement
- Tuta Aquino – editing
- Mark Collen – compilation
- Steve Hodge – mixing, mixing engineer
- Janet Jackson – producer, vocal arrangement, rhythm arrangements
- Jimmy Jam – composer, producer, vocal arrangement, rhythm arrangements
- Terry Lewis – composer, producer, vocal arrangement, rhythm arrangements
- John McClain – executive producer
- Monte Moir – producer
- Shep Pettibone – editing, producer
- Fred McFarlane - remix keyboards, remix programming
- Bob Rosa – remixing
- Steve Wiese – producer

== Charts ==
Chart (1987)	Peak position
European Albums (Top 100)	74
UK Albums (Official Charts)	20

== Certifications ==
Region	Certification	Certified units/sales
United Kingdom (BPI)	Gold	100,000^{^}
^{^} Shipments figures based on certification alone.
