= Crucial (song) =

Single by New Edition

from the album Heart Break & License to Drive soundtrack
- Released: January 31, 1989
- Recorded: 1987–1988
- Genre: New jack swing
- Length: 4:33
- Label: MCA
- Songwriters: Jellybean Johnson, Lisa Keith
- Producers: Jellybean Johnson, Spencer Bernard, Jimmy Jam and Terry Lewis

New Edition singles chronology
| "Can You Stand The Rain" (1988) | "Crucial" (1989) | "N.E. Heart Break" (1989) |

"Crucial" is New Edition's fourth single from the Heart Break album. The single featured production from Jellybean Johnson, Spencer Bernard, and Jimmy Jam and Terry Lewis. "Crucial" hit No. 4 on the Billboard R&B singles chart. It was featured on the License to Drive soundtrack.

== Track listings ==
1. Crucial (12" Dance Remix) – 8:00
2. Crucial (12" Dub) – 5:10
3. Crucial (Acapella) – 4:30

== Personnel ==
- Ronnie DeVoe: background vocals
- Ricky Bell: background vocals
- Michael Bivins: background vocals
- Ralph Tresvant: lead and background vocals
- Johnny Gill: background vocals
