= Heart Break =

Studio album by New Edition
- Released: June 20, 1988
- Recorded: 1987–1988
- Genres: New jack swing; R&B
- Length: 51:41
- Label: MCA
- Producers: Jimmy Jam & Terry Lewis, New Edition, Jellybean Johnson

New Edition chronology
Under the Blue Moon (1986)	Heart Break (1988)	Home Again (1996)

Singles from Heart Break
- 1. "If It Isn't Love" Released: June 7, 1988; 2. "You're Not My Kind of Girl" Released: September 6, 1988; 3. "Can You Stand the Rain" Released: December 3, 1988; 4. "Crucial" Released: January 31, 1989; 5. "N.E. Heart Break" Released: June 16, 1989; 6. "Boys to Men" Released: 1991

Heart Break is the fifth studio album by American R&B quintet New Edition, released June 20, 1988, by MCA Records. It is the first album to return the Boston-reared band as a quintet after the public exit of original member Bobby Brown, and the first album to feature Johnny Gill as a member of the group. The album was certified double platinum by the Recording Industry Association of America (RIAA).

== Background ==
By 1987, New Edition was a group in transition. The band members were aging out of their teens into their twenties, and sought for their image and sound to reflect their coming of age. In addition to employing the famed production team of Jimmy Jam & Terry Lewis to help steer their music into a new direction, they also recruited Washington, D.C.–based baritone/tenor Johnny Gill—who, in 1984, had scored a hit with R&B singer Stacy Lattisaw on "Perfect Combination". The New Edition members had actually known Gill since they released their hit "Candy Girl" in 1983 and Gill released his R&B Top 30 hit "Super Love" that same year. They had joked that they would let him in the group if he could improve his dancing skills. Prompting Gill’s entrance into the group was when lead singer Ralph Tresvant considered recording a solo album. To circumvent New Edition being left without a lead singer, Michael Bivins suggested bringing in 20-year-old Gill to replace him. Gill accepted the invitation, joining the group in the spring of 1987. Tresvant, however, wasn’t ready to leave – resulting in New Edition, inadvertently, becoming a quintet again as they began production on their fifth album, Heart Break.

While most of Heart Break features principal vocals by Tresvant, with occasional solos by Ricky Bell, Gill’s voice is significantly displayed as the secondary lead throughout the album. Gill took the lead on the track “Boys to Men”- a song in which the singer initially resisted and resented recording, feeling it was too juvenile. "Boys To Men" became one of the album's most popular numbers, despite it never being officially released as a single. Another standout album track was "Competition", a song written by Tresvant that addresses the disappointment felt over the departure of Bobby Brown two years earlier.

One song, "Where It All Started", was a thinly veiled jab at New Kids on the Block. The group was discovered by their former producer Maurice Starr as a direct response to New Edition severing ties with him on less than amicable terms. In an ironic twist, Jam & Lewis—the writers and producers behind the song – would also work with New Kids on the Block's lead singer Jordan Knight on his 1999 self-titled debut a little over a decade later. The two groups would later team up for a duet on the latter's 2008 reunion album The Block and perform a medley together at the 49th Annual American Music Awards over a decade later.

== Critical reception ==
Professional ratings
Review scores
Source	Rating
AllMusic	4/5 stars
Los Angeles Times	3/4 stars
Richmond Times-Dispatch	(favorable)
The Rolling Stone Album Guide	3/5 stars

AllMusic editor Craig Lytle called Heart Break an "outstanding album overall" and found that it displayed "New Edition's growth and maturity due in part to the production work of Jimmy Jam and Terry Lewis, and the addition of group newcomer Johnny Gill." Similarly, Washington Post critic Joe Brown noted that "New Edition has grown up visibly and audibly, and it doesn't hurt that they've taken on D.C.'s own Johnny Gill as frontman. The lyrics on Heart Break exemplify the changes—as usual, Jam-Terry Lewis spent some time hanging out with the group, then tailored the tunes with an autobiographical slant."

== Commercial performance ==
Heart Break peaked at numbers twelve and three on the US Billboard 200 and R&B Albums Chart respectively, selling 500,000 copies by August 19, 1988. On September 28, 1988, it was certified platinum in sales by the Recording Industry Association of America (RIAA), following sales in excess of 1 million copies in the United States. After sales of 2 million, it earned double platinum certification from the RIAA in July 1994. Heart Break spun off five singles: "If It Isn't Love", "You're Not My Kind of Girl", "Can You Stand the Rain", "Crucial", and "N.E. Heart Break". "Boys to Men" was released as a sixth single on September 24, 1991.

=== Influence ===
Many have called this particular album the most seminal New Edition album. Four fans from Philadelphia in particular were inspired by one of the songs on the album. "Boys to Men", the song that Johnny Gill hated recording, ended up becoming the name of the group who changed their name to Boyz II Men. The group would end up being managed and mentored by Michael Bivins. Boyz II Men names New Edition as one of their most influential bands. The album also saw a successful concert tour for the group as well. Through 1988 and 1989, New Edition toured all over the world with opening acts, ex-New Edition member Bobby Brown (who had also found big time success with his breakthrough album, Don't Be Cruel) and Al B. Sure!.

R&B group Jagged Edge named their sophomore album J.E. Heartbreak as a tribute to Heart Break.

== Track listing ==
All tracks written and produced by James Harris III and Terry Lewis, unless otherwise stated.

No.	Title	Writer(s)	Producer(s)	Length
1.	"Introduction"			1:04
2.	"That's the Way We're Livin'"	Ricky Bell, Michael Bivins, Ronnie DeVoe, Johnny Gill, Ralph Tresvant	New Edition, Jellybean Johnson	4:02
3.	"Where It All Started"			3:31
4.	"If It Isn't Love"			5:09
5.	"N.E. Heart Break"			5:44
6.	"Crucial"	Garry Johnson, Lisa Keith	Johnson	4:33
7.	"You're Not My Kind of Girl"			4:01
8.	"Superlady"	Bell, Bivins, DeVoe, Gill, Tresvant		5:01
9.	"Can You Stand the Rain"			4:57
10.	"Competition"	Tresvant	Tresvant, Johnson, New Edition (co.)	4:28
11.	"I'm Comin' Home"			5:06
12.	"Boys to Men"		Jimmy Jam and Terry Lewis	4:10

Notes

- "If It Isn't Love", "Crucial", and "Competition" contain dialogue at the end of each song.
- "Where It All Started" is excluded on some vinyl releases of the album.
- "Superlady" was a bonus track not included on original vinyl and cassette copies of the album.

== Personnel ==
- James Harris, III: producer, arranger, keyboards, piano, synthesizers, drum programming, percussion
- Terry Lewis: producer, arranger, bass guitar, percussion, synthesizers
- Jellybean Johnson: producer, arranger, electric guitar, drum programming
- Steve Hodge: engineer, mixing
- New Edition: producer
- Ricky Bell: lead and background vocals
- Michael Bivins: rap, lead and background vocals
- Ronnie DeVoe: rap, lead and background vocals
- Johnny Gill: lead and background vocals
- Ralph Tresvant: lead and background vocals
- Jim Shea: Photography and music video director

== Charts ==
=== Weekly charts ===
Chart performance for Heart Break
Chart (1988)	Peak position
Australian Albums (Kent Music Report)	45
Canadian Albums (RPM)	11
New Zealand Albums (RIANZ)	50
US Billboard 200	12
US Top R&B/Hip-Hop Albums (Billboard)	2

== Certifications ==
Certifications for Heart Break
Region	Certification	Certified units/sales
United States (RIAA)	2× Platinum	2,000,000^{^}
^{^} Shipments figures based on certification alone.
