= You're Not My Kind of Girl =

"You’re Not My Kind of Girl"

Single by New Edition

from the album Heart Break
- Released: September 6, 1988
- Recorded: 1987–1988
- Genre: New jack swing
- Length: 4:01
- Label: MCA
- Songwriters: James Harris, Terry Lewis
- Producer: Jimmy Jam & Terry Lewis

New Edition singles chronology
"If It Isn't Love" (1988)	"You’re Not My Kind of Girl" (1988)	"Can You Stand the Rain" (1988)

"You’re Not My Kind of Girl" is a 1988 song by R&B/Pop group New Edition, and the second single from their fifth studio album, Heart Break.

== Overview ==
Written and produced by Jimmy Jam & Terry Lewis with Ralph Tresvant singing lead, Johnny Gill providing ad-libs and Ricky Bell leading the bridge, this mid-tempo song is about a man being fancied by a woman who he thinks is not his type, and is trying to gently let her down. His friends, meanwhile, can’t understand his lack of interest in the said female, who they believe is a catch.

== Release and reaction ==
Though the song was a sizable hit on urban radio, peaking at #3 on the R&B charts in the fall of 1988— unlike its predecessor, “If It Isn’t Love,” it failed to make the same impression on Billboard’s Hot 100 singles chart—where it peaked at #95.

== Music video ==
The music video for “You’re Not My Kind of Girl” is set to a concert performance of the song (which was led in by the music video for “If It Isn’t Love.”) The concert was held at Sony Pictures Studios in Culver City, California. New Edition held a radio contest for tickets to the taping, which were won by LA resident, Viveca McGuire. The version of the song featured in the music video is the single version of the Extended Version, rather than the one from the studio album.
