= If It Isn't Love =

Single by New Edition

from the album Heart Break
- Released: June 9, 1988
- Recorded: November 1987
- Studio: Flyte Tyme Studios (Minneapolis, Minnesota)
- Genre: R&B; new jack swing
- Length: 5:10 (album version); 3:48 (single version)
- Label: MCA
- Songwriter(s): James Harris III; Terry Lewis
- Producer(s): Jimmy Jam and Terry Lewis

New Edition singles chronology
"Count Me Out" (1985)	"If It Isn't Love" (1988)	"You're Not My Kind of Girl" (1988)

Music video
- "If It Isn't Love" on YouTube

"If It Isn't Love" is a song by American R&B quintet New Edition, and the first single from their fifth studio album, Heart Break (1988). The song was released on June 9, 1988 by MCA Records. It became the biggest hit from the album, reaching the top ten of the US Billboard Hot 100, peaking at number seven, becoming their first top 10 hit following the departure of Bobby Brown, and reaching the second position on the Hot Black Singles chart. The song and video is also notable for being the introduction of fellow R&B singer Johnny Gill as a new member of the R&B quintet. Its chart performance and well-received music video garnered the quintet their first, and to date, sole nomination for the Best R&B Performance by a Duo or Group with Vocals at the 31st Grammy Awards in February 1989.

== Overview ==
Written and produced by Jimmy Jam & Terry Lewis, the song spoke of a man who left a troubling relationship because he didn't want to fall in love, only to find out that he was in fact in love with his former girlfriend but is still in a dilemma over it: if it isn't love/why do I feel this way/why does she stay on my mind? The song has a memorable breakdown similar to that of The Jackson 5, where lead singer Ralph Tresvant admits that he made a mistake and he realizes he does love her, though his resolve is crushed as his bandmates then retort: You love her, what?! Though he is optimistic that he will get her back.

=== Release and reaction ===
This song returned New Edition to the top ten of both the pop and R&B singles charts, peaking at number seven and two, respectively. They were held off from the top spot of the Hot Black Singles chart by the same person that was voted out of the group just two years prior, Bobby Brown with his #8 pop hit "Don't Be Cruel". The music video for the song showcased the group along with their manager, Brooke Payne, going over rehearsal for a concert which has the band gearing up to hit the stage. The video ended with the group running towards the stage, and transitioned them into their next music video; a concert performance for the follow-up single, "You're Not My Kind of Girl."

== Track listing ==
1. If It Isn't Love (12" Club Mix) - (7:42)
2. If It Isn't Love (Instrumental) - (5:10)
3. If It Isn't Love (Low Key Mix) - (4:30)

== Personnel ==
- Ronnie DeVoe: background vocals
- Ricky Bell: background vocals
- Michael Bivins: background vocals
- Ralph Tresvant: lead vocals & background vocals
- Johnny Gill: background vocals.

== Charts ==
=== Weekly charts ===
Chart (1988)	Peak position
US Billboard Hot 100	7
US Hot Black Singles (Billboard)	2
US Dance Club Songs (Billboard)	20
US Hot Dance Singles Sales (Billboard)	10
UK Singles Chart	94

=== Year-end charts ===
Chart (1988)	Position
US Billboard Hot 100	67

== Certifications ==
Region	Certification	Certified units/sales
United States (RIAA)	Platinum	1,000,000^{‡}
^{‡} Sales+streaming figures based on certification alone.

== Trivia ==
- In their December 2, 2019 Monday Night Football game, four Seattle Seahawks, led by David Moore — and including Jaron Brown, Tyler Lockett, and DK Metcalf — used the dance from the video in their touchdown celebration.
- Beyoncé's video for her single "Love on Top" was inspired by the music video for "If It Isn't Love"
- Brooke Payne appears as the group's choreographer in the video.
- Sampled on rap group Kidz In The Hall 2008 release song "Whattup Wit Me".
- Sampled by Trick Daddy on his song "Ain't a Thug" from his album Thug Matrimony: Married to the Streets.
- Sung by Romeo, Bullethead and their singing group for a talent show on an episode of The Steve Harvey Show.
- The song is featured in the Wii game The Hip Hop Dance Experience.
- Sampled by Sevyn Streeter on her song "Fallen" (featuring Ty Dolla $ign and Cam Wallace) from her debut studio album Girl Disrupted.
- Sampled by Wale on his song "The One Time In Houston" from his album The Album About Nothing.
- Sampled by Kehlani on her song "In My Feelings" from her debut studio album SweetSexySavage.
