= Can You Stand the Rain =

1988 single by New Edition

Single by New Edition

from the album Heart Break
- Released: December 3, 1988
- Recorded: 1988
- Genre: New jack swing; R&B
- Length: 4:57
- Label: MCA
- Songwriter(s): James Harris III; Terry Lewis
- Producer(s): Jimmy Jam and Terry Lewis

New Edition singles chronology
"You're Not My Kind of Girl" (1988)	"Can You Stand the Rain" (1988)	"Crucial" (1989)

Music video
- "Can You Stand the Rain" on YouTube

"Can You Stand the Rain" is a ballad by R&B/pop group New Edition. The song was released on December 3, 1988 by MCA Records as the third single from their fifth studio album, Heart Break.

== Overview ==
Written and produced by Jimmy Jam and Terry Lewis with Johnny Gill, Ralph Tresvant and Ricky Bell on lead vocals and Michael Bivins with a spoken piece, "Can You Stand the Rain" is about a relationship presently going well, but the singer is asking his partner if he can count on her to remain by his side, in case things should ever become stormy.

== Release and reception ==
Despite "Can You Stand The Rain" failing to reach the Hot 100 top forty, peaking instead at number 44, it became New Edition's fourth single to top Billboard's R&B singles chart.

== Track listings ==
1. "Can You Stand the Rain" (Album Version) - 5:00
2. "Can You Stand the Rain" (Under the Lamppost/Quiet Storm Mix) - 4:35
3. "Can You Stand the Rain" (Extended Version) - 6:56

== Other versions ==
"Can You Stand the Rain" was interpolated by New Edition themselves for their 1996 song, "Home Again" from their album of the same name.

"Can You Stand the Rain" was covered by Boyz II Men for their 1997 album, Evolution.

In 2001, freestyle singers Safire & Cynthia turned the song into a freestyle/club jam, and the song was featured on Safire's CD "Bringing Back The Groove". In 2002, Tom Scott covered it on his smooth jazz album, "New Found Freedom". In 2003, the song was also covered by Guy Sebastian, the first winner of Australian Idol, on his debut album, Just as I am.

The song gained attention in Making the Band, when covered by contestants in the show.

In 2008, gospel group The Murrills covered the song with alternative lyrics for their album, Family Prayer.

"Can You Stand the Rain" was sampled by Big Sean for his single "My Last" featuring Chris Brown.

It was featured during the "Thanksgiving" episode of the second season of the Netflix series Master of None.

It was featured during the Lip-synching scene in the 2013 holiday film, The Best Man Holiday.

It was featured in the season 15 of The Voice performed by contestants DeAndre Nico and Funsho from Team Adam.

“Can You Stand the Rain" was sampled by K. Michelle for her single, The Rain for her album All Monsters Are Human

“Can You Stand the Rain” is used as an official theme song used with respect by Late Night Vibes on “ TikTok ” hosted by realthugdrama and hizcupcake.

It was performed in the miniseries The New Edition Story on BET, by Algee Smith, Bryshere Y. Gray, Elijah Kelley, Keith Powers, & Luke James.

“Can You Stand the Rain" was sampled by Rod Wave for his single, Already Won featuring Lil Durk for his deluxe album Soulfly.

== Charts ==
=== Weekly charts ===
Chart (1988–1989)	Peak position
US Billboard Hot 100	44
US Hot Black Singles (Billboard)	1

=== Year-end charts ===
Chart (1989)	Position
US Hot Black Singles (Billboard)	32

== Certifications ==
Region	Certification	Certified units/sales
United States (RIAA)	2× Platinum	2,000,000^{‡}
^{‡} Sales+streaming figures based on certification alone.
