= Bullethead (band) =

Australian rock band

- Bullethead

Background information
- Origin: New South Wales, Australia
- Genres: rock, metal, modern rock
- Label: MGM
- Members: Alex Hermescec; Graham Young; Josh Kynaston

BulletHead is an Australian rock band that formed in 2000 under the name Rubikon. Its members consist of Alex Hermescec, Graham Young and Josh Kynaston. The band's music is influenced by Tool, Killswitch Engage, Metallica, Killing Joke and Helmet.

BulletHead's film clip Love N War has been featured on ABC's Rage, and numerous other music network TV and Radio stations such as Triple M. In 2006, music critic from the Naked Dwarf declared BulletHead as one of the best heavy rock bands to come out of Australia. In 2007, Alex Hermescec also known as Skuey was declared an alternative guitar hero by NME magazine.

== Career ==
Bullethead’s debut album, Know Your Enemy, is a compilation of 11 tracks of hard core, heavy rock music. It reached some success in the United States and Europe; however, it did not do so well in Australia. It was written by Alex Hermescec and Graham Young. Know Your Enemy was published in 2006 through MGM.

Rubikon was well known for breaking attendance records at the main room Metro Theatre and other live venues across Australia.

In 2007, the band were set to record recorded their second album GAIA with 25 Gold and Platinum record producer of Prince, Red Hot Chili Peppers, Johnny Cash, System of a Down, TOOL, Smashing Pumpkins producer Shivvy. Unfortunately the band dissolved after the Know Your Enemy release and half way through the "Get Head" Tour. "After years of hard slogging through the Australian hard rock terrains, we had exhausted ourselves". In Skueys mind, Know Your Enemy was a disappointing failure.

== Discography ==
=== Album ===
==== Know Your Enemy ====
Song Title	Year
Love & War	2006
Apache	2006
Difference	2006
The Prophet	2006
I AM	2006
Misery	2006
Living Lie	2006
Where it begins	2006
The Darkness	2006
Promise made	2006
Fight for me	2006

=== Singles ===
Song Title	Year
Defender of the Faith	2011
