= Spencer Bernard (songwriter) =

American songwriter

Spencer Bernard is an American songwriter, record producer, and musician. He is a long-time associate of hitmakers Jimmy Jam and Terry Lewis and a part of the Flyte Tyme Productions crew. Throughout his career he has done session work for Janet Jackson, Cherrelle, Nona Hendryx, and New Edition. He also wrote songs for his wife Lisa Keith (who was also a part of the Flyte Tyme Productions crew), Janet Jackson, and many others. He first joined Flyte Tyme while the bass player for Minneapolis-based band King's English.

Spencer is a pastor at Evergreen Church in Bloomington, Minnesota.
