= New jack swing =

Fusion genre of music

- Other names: New jack; swingbeat
- Stylistic origins: Contemporary R&B; funk; hip-hop; jazz; dance-pop
- Cultural origins: 1985–1987, United States
- Typical instruments: Vocals; keyboard; synthesizer; drum machine; sampler
- Derivative forms: Hip-hop soul

Other topics
- List of artists; hip house; G-funk; Golden age of hip-hop

New jack swing, new jack, or swingbeat is a fusion genre of the rhythms and production techniques of hip-hop and dance-pop, and the urban contemporary sound of R&B. Spearheaded by producers Teddy Riley, Bernard Belle, Jimmy Jam and Terry Lewis, and Dallas Austin, new jack swing was most popular from the late 1980s to early 1990s.

New jack swing can be defined as "pop music usually performed by black musicians that combines elements of jazz, funk, rap, and rhythm and blues." New jack swing producers created synthesized tunes and sampled beats, using digital synthesizers (such as the Yamaha DX7 and Roland D50), drum machines (such as the Roland TR-808 and LinnDrum, and frequently the Roland R-8) and samplers (such as the SP-1200 and Akai samplers), to lay an "insistent beat under light melody lines and clearly enunciated vocals." The TR-808 in particular was sampled to create distinctive, syncopated, swung rhythms, with its snare sound being especially prominent.

== Etymology ==
The term "new jack swing" was coined in an October 18, 1987, Village Voice profile of Teddy Riley by Barry Michael Cooper. "New Jack" was a slang term (meaning "Johnny-come-lately") used in a song by Grandmaster Caz of the Cold Crush Brothers, and "swing" was intended by Cooper to draw an "analogy between the music played at the speak easies of F. Scott Fitzgerald's time to the crack-houses of Teddy Riley's time".

The term "new jack swing" describes the sound produced and engineered by R&B/hip hop artist and producer Teddy Riley. Riley is an American R&B and hip-hop singer-songwriter, musician, and record producer, who led the band Guy in the late 1980s and Blackstreet in the 1990s. Riley said, "I define the term [new jack swing] as a new kid on the block who's swinging it." The defining feature of Riley's music was the introduction of swingbeats, "a rhythmic pattern using offbeat accented 16th note triplets". In an interview with Revolt TV in 2017, Andre Harrell called Riley the inventor of the sound, hailing him "the king of New Jack Swing, because he invented it".

== History ==
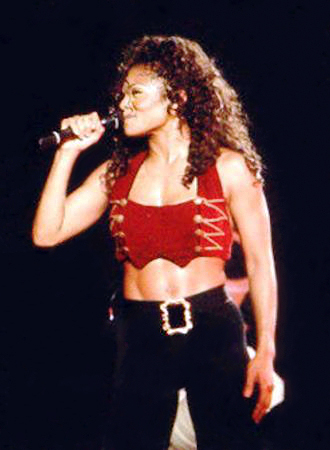
Janet Jackson's Control, released in 1986, was one of the most critically acclaimed albums of the 1980s.

Producer Kyle West remembered 1985 as the year he listened to new jack swing with Teddy Riley. According to English singer-songwriter and producer Junior Giscombe, Riley as well as drummer Lenny White, credited the start of new jack swing to his 1985 single "Oh Louise". Some music critics said Full Force's "Alice, I Want You Just for Me" (1985) was the first new jack swing song. Jimmy Jam and Terry Lewis produced Janet Jackson's digital R&B album, Control (1986). Musicologist Richard J. Ripani PhD, author of The New Blue Music: Changes in Rhythm & Blues, 1950–1999 (2006), observed that the album was one of the first successful records to influence the rise of new jack swing by creating a fusion of R&B, rap, funk, disco and synthesized percussion. The new jack swing sound is particularly evident in the second single, "Nasty". The success of Control, according to Ripani, bridged the gap between R&B and rap music. He asserts that "since Jackson's album was released in 1986 and was hugely successful, it is not unreasonable to assume that it had at least some impact on the new jack swing creations of Teddy Riley."

Music website VH1.com notes that, while "hip-hop and R&B are kissing cousins" in the 2000s, "the two genres were seldom mentioned in the same breath" in the early 1980s. However, in the late 1980s, "during the era of high-top fades, and parachute pants, producer Teddy Riley and label boss Andre Harrell successfully fused and marketed the two sounds in a sexy, exclamatory music that critics termed new jack swing. It sparked a revolution." Riley stated that before new jack swing, "rappers and singers didn't want anything to do with one another", because "singers were soft, rappers were street." Riley's new style blended "sweet melody and big beats". The sensibilities of Riley's fusion of the styles would forever change pop music/hip-hop music pairing and was further popularized with Bad Boy's dominance of the late '90s through much of the same techniques. Riley, a 19-year-old man from Harlem, quickly became an A-list producer and commanded big fees to add his sound to major artist projects.

== Influences ==
The 1989 film Ghostbusters II helped spread new jack swing with its theme song, "On Our Own" by Bobby Brown (written by L.A. Reid, Babyface and Daryl Simmons), who was along with Riley nicknamed "The King of New Jack Swing". NBC sitcom The Fresh Prince of Bel-Air also boosted the spread of this culture, as the star of the show, Will Smith, was known initially for his hip-hop duo with DJ Jazzy Jeff. During the first episode of the series, Will Smith dances to the Soul II Soul new jack swing single "Back to Life (However Do You Want Me)". In other episodes, he sings "Teddy's Jam" and "Rump Shaker". A Different World, Waynehead and In Living Color are other television programs of the era which exhibit influences from the new jack swing style. Video Soul, Soul Train, Showtime at the Apollo as well as the late night talk show The Arsenio Hall Show also helped to promote these acts.

To date the most successful new jack swing album is Dangerous, released in 1991 by Michael Jackson, produced by Jackson and Riley, which has sold over 30 million copies worldwide.

== Golden age ==
"You Called and Told Me"
Produced by Dave Hall, the gold-certified single by Jeff Redd was featured on the soundtrack album to the 1991 film Strictly Business.

Many songs with elements of new jack swing peaked in the top 10 of the U.S. R&B and U.S. Billboard Hot 100 chart throughout the late 1980s and early 1990s. The height of its popularity was 1988–1993, with it reaching its peak in 1990.

In 1987, Keith Sweat's first new jack swing song "I Want Her" peaked at number 5 on the U.S. Billboard Hot 100 chart. It is considered the first new jack swing hit. A few months later, Bobby Brown's "My Prerogative" would take the genre even further.

The musician and record producer Teddy Riley's group Guy, a group which was one of the early pioneers of hip-hop and R&B had a hit with the song "Groove Me", which went to number 4 in the US R&B charts, and the 1988 song "Teddy's Jam", which ranked number 5 in the US R&B charts. Single "My Fantasy" was from the OST Do the Right Thing. "New Jack City" was on the soundtrack for the film of the same title. Johnny Kemp's "Just Got Paid" also cracked the top 10 on the Billboard Hot 100 in 1988 and went to number 1 on the Hot Dance Music/Club Play. Musician Al B. Sure! had success with "Nite and Day" and two other singles that went to the Top 5 of the R&B chart in 1988.

In 1988, Bobby Brown began his string of Top 10 Billboard hits from his second album, Don't Be Cruel, which ranked number 1 in the US. In that same year, Paula Abdul had the US number 1 hit "Straight Up". Tony! Toni! Toné! had three songs in the top ten of the Hot R&B/Hip-Hop Singles & Tracks, including "Little Walter" which hit number 1. New Edition after being in a transition due to the departure of Bobby Brown recruited Johnny Gill as his placement, leading to the release of the Jimmy Jam and Terry Lewis produced album Heart Break, which spun off five hit singles "If It Isn't Love", "You're Not My Kind of Girl", "Can You Stand the Rain", "Crucial", and "N.E. Heartbreak".

In 1988, Wreckx-n-Effect, a Teddy Riley-produced group which garnered press attention regarding their use of bikini-clad women in their videos, released "New Jack Swing", helping to popularize the new name for the emerging style. That same year, Fenderella garnered a hit with "Mr. DJ", a song with featured Doug E. Fresh, who was known as the "human beatbox" for his realistic imitations of drum machines and other hip-hop sounds.

Jimmy Jam and Terry Lewis produced seven hit singles off the 1989 album Janet Jackson's Rhythm Nation 1814, which merged the Minneapolis sound with new jack swing. The album included a number of successful tracks, such as the number one Billboard Hot 100 hits "Miss You Much". Karyn White, also produced by the Flyte Time team also had hits in the late 1980s and early 1990s. Sheena Easton also had a few hits from her 1991 album What Comes Naturally produced by hitmaker Vassel Benford. Producer Babyface had a hit with his song "It's No Crime", which ranked number 7 in the US charts and number 1 on the US R&B charts. Another Teddy Riley–produced group, Today, had a hit with "Girl I Got My Eyes on You", which garnered a number 1 spot on the US R&B charts.

After the band New Edition broke up, its former members formed several splinter groups or acts, including Bell Biv DeVoe, Johnny Gill, Ralph Tresvant, and Bobby Brown. In 1990, several ex-New Edition members had hit songs. Bell Biv DeVoe's songs "Poison" and "Do Me!", as well as Johnny Gill's single "Rub You the Right Way", all made it to number 3 in the US top 100. Ralph Tresvant had a number 4 hit (US top 100 charts) and number 1 hit (US R&B) with his song "Sensitivity", with another on the House Party 2 soundtrack "Yo Baby Yo". Also in 1990 pop singer Whitney Houston recorded "I'm Your Baby Tonight", produced by Babyface & Antonio "L.A." Reid (later a record executive). The single topped the US Hot 100, giving Babyface his first produced number 1 song while further helping to bring the genre to the mainstream. The album's fourth single, "My Name Is Not Susan", also utilized the same style, peaking at number 20 on the US Top 100.

In 1990, "Hold On", produced by Denzil Foster and Thomas McElroy and co-written with members of En Vogue (the new Oakland, California girl group they co-founded), was released as the first single off the group's debut album, Born to Sing (1990). The song peaked at number 2 on the Billboard Hot 100, and number 1 on the Billboard Dance Club Play, 12-inch Singles Sales, and Hot Black Singles charts. "Hold On" was one of several tracks on their debut album and sophomore album Funky Divas (1992) to feature new jack swing. Both albums were certified triple platinum by the Recording Industry Association of America (RIAA).

Meanwhile, Samuelle, a former member of the disco-infused dance-urban group Club Nouveau had a number 1 R&B hit with "So You Like What You See". Troop also had a number 1 hit with a single from their second album, Attitude, entitled "Spread My Wings". "Feels Good" by the Oakland group Tony! Toni! Toné! reached number 1 on the R&B charts in 1990, and it also placed on the US top 100 (number 9) and on the dance charts (number 3). Today charted again in 1990 with "Why You Gettin' Funky on Me?", which reached number 2 on the R&B charts. "Let's Chill" by Guy garnered a number 3 spot on the US R&B charts.

"Feels Like Another One" is a 1991 single co-written and recorded by singer Patti LaBelle off her album, Burnin. The new jack swing-styled track was the leading track for LaBelle's eleventh solo album and featured a rap from rapper Big Daddy Kane. The track became successful on the R&B chart as it ended up peaking at number three on the Hot R&B Singles chart. The video for the song was shot at the Apollo Theater and also featured Kane, who appeared at LaBelle's show wearing a tux. The song would help LaBelle's album go gold. Color Me Badd had a number 1 hit with "I Wanna Sex You Up". That same year, Christopher Williams released a single "I'm Dreamin'" from the New Jack City soundtrack, which became a number 1 single on Billboard′s Hot R&B/Hip-Hop chart. Boyz II Men's debut single "Motownphilly" was a number 1 R&B and top 5 U.S. pop hit. "I Like the Way (The Kissing Game)" by Hi-Five garnered the US number 1 and R&B number 1 spots. Jodeci's debut album Forever My Lady garnered three number 1 R&B Hits in the fall of 1991 ("Forever My Lady", "Stay", and "Come and Talk To Me"). "Exclusivity" by Damian Dame charted as number-one R&B single, spending two weeks at the top position, a position also achieved by the Rude Boys with their song "Are You Lonely For Me".

In 1992, Michael Jackson's singles "Remember the Time" and "In the Closet" placed in the top 10 on the Billboard Hot 100, the top 2 in the Hot Dance Music/Club category, and reached number 1 in the Hot R&B/Hip-Hop category. "Jam" also reached the top 5 in Hot Dance Music/Club and Hot R&B/Hip-Hop. Joe Public's single "Live and Learn" hit number 4 on the U.S. Billboard Hot 100, number 3 on Billboard′s Hot R&B/Hip-Hop chart and becoming the group's most successful single. In 1993 Teddy Riley's new group Blackstreet got new jack swing hit "Baby Be Mine". Chuckii Booker scored a number 1 R&B hit with his song "Games". That same year, "She's Got That Vibe" by R. Kelly and Public Announcement reached the number 7 position on the R&B charts. "Weak" by SWV (Sisters With Voices) hit the number one spot on both the US top 100 and the R&B charts. In 1993: "Don't Walk Away" by Jade made it to number 4 and number 3 in the US top 100 and R&B charts, respectively. The New Jack R&B group II D Extreme scored a hit in 1993 with their New Jack ballad "Cry No More". TLC's debut album, Ooooooohhh... On the TLC Tip (1992) had several hits, including "What About Your Friends", "Ain't 2 Proud 2 Beg" and "Baby-Baby-Baby".

In 1994, Aaliyah released her debut album, Age Ain't Nothing but a Number, at just 15 years old. The album received generally favorable reviews from critics, many of whom praised Aaliyah's vocal ability and the lyrical content, and she was credited with helping redefine contemporary R&B by blending her smooth, understated vocal style with R. Kelly’s new jack swing production. Age Ain’t Nothing but a Number peaked at number 18 on the Billboard 200 and was certified double platinum by the Recording Industry Association of America (RIAA), selling over three million copies in the United States and six million copies worldwide. The album produced two top-ten singles on the Billboard Hot 100—“Back & Forth” and a cover of the Isley Brothers’ 1976 hit “(At Your Best) You Are Love”—both of which were certified gold by the RIAA. Aaliyah was among the first teenage female R&B artists to achieve major commercial success in the mid-1990s, representing a late-stage evolution of New Jack Swing that blended smooth vocals with contemporary swing-based production. Her success helped pave the way for other young female performers, including Brandy, Monica, Mýa, and eventually Britney Spears, who debuted in the years following.

In 1995, Montell Jordan had a number one new jack swing hit, in "This is How We Do It", which after its release saw the popularity of the genre decline. As hip-hop culture became increasingly ubiquitous, the pop-crossover approach and perceived artifice of new jack swing began to lose its appeal with young urban listeners. Even the creator of the New Jack Swing, Teddy Riley, made his sound evolve with his second supergroup BLACKStreet, with their 1994's eponymous first album. A sound he sometimes called "Heavy R&B" in interviews.

The last hit single of the classic new jack swing era was Michael Jackson's "Blood on the Dance Floor", released in 1997.

== Incorporation into pop music ==
Australian pop singer Kylie Minogue incorporated a strong new jack swing sound into her 1991 album Let's Get to It, most notably the lead single "Word Is Out". The album and singles achieved notable success in the UK, Australia and throughout Europe.

== Revival ==
American pop singer Bruno Mars infused elements into his 2016 third album 24K Magic, with fifth single "Finesse" being completely influenced by new jack swing. The song was a commercial success, peaking at number two in New Zealand, number three in the United States and Canada, and the top ten of Australia, Ireland, the Netherlands and the United Kingdom.

Many artists would attempt to revive new jack swing through the late 2010s and early 2020s, to limited avail. PrettyMuch's 2017 single "#WOULDYOUMIND" reached 40 in the US pop chart, as well as 100 in the UK pop chart.

New Jack Swing's revival received much greater traction in the K-pop scene. In 2018, "Lady" by girl group EXID reached number 37 in South Korean billboard charts. 2024's "Supernatural" by "NewJeans" reached number 2 in US Billboard's World Digital Songs chart.

== See also ==
- List of funk musicians
