= Ralph Tresvant discography =

This is the discography documenting albums and singles released by American R&B/pop singer Ralph Tresvant.

== Studio albums ==
Year	Album details	Peak chart positions						Certifications (sales threshold)
Year	Album details	US	US R&B	AUS	CAN	NZ	UK	Certifications (sales threshold)
1990	Ralph Tresvant: Release date: November 27, 1990; Label: MCA Records	17	1	107	42	22	37	RIAA: Platinum
1994	It's Goin' Down: Release date: January 19, 1994; Label: MCA Records	131	24	—	—	—	—	
2006	Rizz-Wa-Faire: Release date: March 7, 2006; Label: Xzault Records	—	88	—	—	—	—	
"—" denotes releases that did not chart or were not released in that territory.

== Singles ==
=== As lead artist ===
Year	Single	Peak chart positions									Certifications (sales threshold)	Album
Year	Single	US	US R&B	US Dance	AUS	CAN	CAN Dance	IRL	NZ	UK	Certifications (sales threshold)	Album
1990	"Sensitivity"	4	1	19	62	2	8	29	6	18	RIAA: Gold	Ralph Tresvant
1991	"Stone Cold Gentleman"	34	3	28	83	—	—	—	25	78		Ralph Tresvant
1991	"Do What I Gotta Do"	—	2	26	—	—	—	—	—	—		Ralph Tresvant
1991	"Rated R"	—	69	—	158	—	—	—	—	—		Ralph Tresvant
1991	"Yo, Baby, Yo!"	—	31	—	—	—	—	—	—	—		House Party 2 (soundtrack)
1992	"Money Can't Buy You Love"	54	2	—	93	—	—	—	—	—		Mo' Money (soundtrack)
1993	"Who's the Mack"	—	35	—	—	—	—	—	—	—		It's Goin' Down
1994	"When I Need Somebody"	—	45	—	—	—	—	—	—	—		It's Goin' Down
2006	"My Homegirl"	—	60	—	—	—	—	—	—	—		Rizz-Wa-Faire
2009	"It Must Be You"	—	—	—	—	—	—	—	—	—		Non-album song
2020	"All Mine" (featuring Johnny Gill)	—	—	—	—	—	—	—	—	—		Non-album song
"—" denotes releases that did not chart or were not released in that territory.

=== As featured artist ===
Year	Title	Peak chart positions					Certifications	Album
Year	Title	US	IRE	NOR	NZ	SWE	Certifications	Album
1991	"Word to the Mutha!" (Bell Biv DeVoe featuring Bobby Brown, Ralph Tresvant and Johnny Gill)	—	—	—	—	—		WBBD-Bootcity!: The Remix Album
1992	"The Best Things in Life Are Free" (Luther Vandross and Janet Jackson featuring Bell Biv DeVoe and Ralph Tresvant)	10	6	—	6	36		Mo' Money
2015	"Old Thing Back" (Matoma and The Notorious B.I.G. featuring Ja Rule and Ralph Tresvant)	—	74	2	25	11	RMNZ: 3× Platinum	Non-album single
"—" denotes releases that did not chart or were not released in that territory.

== Music videos ==
Year	Video	Director
1991	"Voices That Care" (Various)	David S. Jackson
