= 1991 Soul Train Music Awards =

Music awards ceremony in Los Angeles, US

Soul Train Music Awards
- Date: March 12, 1991
- Location: Shrine Auditorium, Los Angeles, California
- Country: United States
- Hosted by: Dionne Warwick, Patti LaBelle and Luther Vandross
- First award: 1987

Highlights
- Most awards: Mariah Carey and MC Hammer (3)
- Website: soultrain.com

Television/radio coverage
- Network: WGN America

The 1991 Soul Train Music Awards aired live on March 12, 1991 (and was later syndicated in other areas), honoring the best in R&B, soul, rap, jazz, and gospel music from the previous year. The show was held at the Shrine Auditorium in Los Angeles, California and was hosted by Patti LaBelle, Luther Vandross and Dionne Warwick.

== Special awards ==
=== Heritage Award for Career Achievement ===
- Smokey Robinson

=== Sammy Davis Jr. Award for Entertainer of the Year ===
- M.C. Hammer

== Winners and nominees ==
Winners are in bold text.

=== Best R&B/Urban Contemporary Album of the Year – Male ===
- **Johnny Gill – Johnny Gill**
  - Al B. Sure! - Private Times...and the Whole 9!
  - MC Hammer – Please Hammer Don't Hurt 'Em
  - Keith Sweat – I'll Give All My Love to You

=== Best R&B/Urban Contemporary Album of the Year – Female ===
- **Mariah Carey – Mariah Carey**
  - Anita Baker – Compositions
  - Michel'le – Michel'le
  - Lisa Stansfield – Affection

=== Best R&B/Urban Contemporary Album of the Year – Group, Band, or Duo ===
- **Bell Biv Devoe – Poison**
  - En Vogue – Born to Sing
  - Tony! Toni! Toné! – The Revival
  - The Whispers – More of the Night

=== Best R&B/Urban Contemporary Single – Male ===
- **Johnny Gill – "My, My, My"**
  - Babyface – "Whip Appeal"
  - MC Hammer – "U Can't Touch This"
  - James Ingram – "I Don't Have the Heart"

=== Best R&B/Urban Contemporary Single – Female ===
- **Mariah Carey – "Vision of Love"**
  - Anita Baker – "Talk to Me"
  - Janet Jackson – "Alright"
  - Lisa Stansfield – "All Around the World"

=== Best R&B/Urban Contemporary Single – Group, Band or Duo ===
- **En Vogue – "Hold On"**
  - After 7 – "Ready or Not"
  - Bell Biv DeVoe – "Poison"
  - Quincy Jones (featuring El DeBarge, Al B Sure!, James Ingram and Barry White) – "The Secret Garden (Sweet Seduction Suite)"

=== Best R&B/Urban Contemporary Song of the Year ===
- **MC Hammer – "U Can't Touch This"**
  - Johnny Gill – "My, My, My"
  - Mariah Carey - "Vision Of Love"
  - En Vogue – "Hold On"

=== Best Music Video ===
- **Janet Jackson – "Alright"**
  - En Vogue – "Hold On"
  - MC Hammer – "U Can't Touch This"
  - Public Enemy – "911 Is a Joke"

=== Best R&B/Urban Contemporary New Artist ===
- **Mariah Carey**
  - Oleta Adams
  - En Vogue
  - Vanilla Ice

=== Best Rap Album ===
- **MC Hammer – Please Hammer Don't Hurt 'Em**
  - Ice Cube – Amerikkka's Most Wanted
  - LL Cool J – Mama Said Knock You Out
  - Public Enemy – Fear of a Black Planet

=== Best Gospel Album ===
- **The Winans – Return**
  - Commissioned – State of Mind
  - Tramaine Hawkins – Live
  - Take 6 – So Much to Say

=== Best Jazz Album ===
- **Najee – Tokyo Blue**
  - Anita Baker – Compositions
  - Branford Marsalis Quartet and Terence Blanchard – Music from Mo Better Blues
  - Take 6 – So Much to Say

== Performers ==
- Johnny Gill – "Rub You the Right Way"
- Ralph Tresvant – "Sensitivity"
- Bell Biv DeVoe – "She's Dope!"
- En Vogue – "Hold On"
- LL Cool J – "Around the Way Girl"
- Dionne Warwick – "Night and Day"
- Teddy Pendergrass – "Make It With You"
- Smokey Robinson Tribute:
  - Luther Vandross – "Since I Lost My Baby"
  - Patti LaBelle – "Ooo Baby Baby"
  - Gladys Knight – "The Tracks of My Tears"
- MC Hammer – Medley: "Let's Get It Started" / "Turn This Mutha Out" / "Here Comes the Hammer"

== Presenters ==
- Heavy D, Anita Pointer, and Al Jarreau - Presented Best Urban Contemporary New Artist
- Sheena Easton and The Boys - Presented Best Gospel Album
- Fred Hammond, Oleta Adams, and Tony! Toni! Tone! - Presented Best Jazz Album
- Altovise Davis - Presented Sammy Davis Jr. For Entertainer of the Year
- James Ingram, Tramaine Hawkins, and Run DMC - Presented Best R&B Urban Contemporary Single Female
- David Peaston, Queen Latifah, and After 7 - Presented Best Music Video
- The Winans, Michel'le, and Ice-T - Presented Best R&B Urban Contemporary Single Group, Band, or Duo
- BeBe and CeCe Winans, John Tesh, and Vanessa Williams - Presented Best Rap Album
- Whoopi Goldberg - Presented Outstanding Award For Career Achievement
- Barry White, Cree Summer, and Big Daddy Kane - Presented Best R&B Urban Contemporary Single Male
- Take 6, Vanity, and Will Smith - Presented Urban Contemporary Song of the Year
- Holly Robinson Peete, Stephanie Mills, and Guy - Presented Best R&B Urban Contemporary Album Female
- Jody Watley, Mario Van Peebles, and Kid 'n Play - Presented Best R&B Urban Contemporary Album Male
- Sinbad, Rosie Perez, and Jeffrey Osborne - Presented Best R&B Urban Contemporary Album Group, Band, or Duo
