= WBBD-Bootcity!: The Remix Album =

Remix album by Bell Biv DeVoe
- Released: August 27, 1991
- Recorded: 1991
- Genre: Hip hop; R&B
- Length: 55:23
- Label: MCA
- Producer: Ronnie DeVoe; Gary G-Wiz; Hank Shocklee; Marley Marl; Wolf & Epic

Bell Biv DeVoe chronology
Poison (1990)	WBBD-Bootcity!: The Remix Album (1991)	Hootie Mack (1993)

Professional ratings
Review scores
Source	Rating
AllMusic	2.5/5 stars
The Encyclopedia of Popular Music	3/5 stars
The Rolling Stone Album Guide	3/5 stars

WBBD - Bootcity!: The Remix Album is a remix album released by R&B group Bell Biv DeVoe. It was released on August 27, 1991 via MCA Records, and was composed of remixes of songs from the group's debut album Poison. The album reached No. 18 on the Billboard 200. It was certified gold on October 23, 1991.

Bobby Brown, Johnny Gill, and Ralph Tresvant appear on "Word to the Mutha!", making for a New Edition reunion.

== Critical reception ==
The Rolling Stone Album Guide wrote that "the beefed up beats are generally a plus," but panned the New Edition reunion. The Sun Sentinel called the album "unimaginative," writing that "buried underneath all this remixing, heavy studio gimmickry, scratching and technological gymnastics, the group's vocals are barely audible." The Globe and Mail wrote that "deejays and those who live to dance will revel in the furious, bottom-heavy rhythms."

== Track listing ==
No.	Title	Writer(s)	Producer(s)	Length
1.	"Intro/D.J. Opening"	Dallas Austin; Michael Bivins; Jeff Gill; Ronnie DeVoe	Ron DeVoe	0:54
2.	"Word to the Mutha!" (featuring Bobby Brown, Ralph Tresvant and Johnny Gill)	Ricky Bell; Bivins; DeVoe; Bret "Epic" Mazur; Richard Wolf	Wolf & Epic; New Edition^{[a]}	6:38
3.	"Ain't Nut'in' Changed!"	Keith Shocklee; Hank Shocklee; Eric Sadler; Darrol Durant	Hank Shocklee; Eric "Vietnam" Sadler; Keith Shocklee; Robert "Money Walker" DeVoe^{[b]}; Roland "Rizzo Destroyer" DeVoe^{[b]}; Donald "Smooth Mellow" D. Harrison^{[b]}	2:23
4.	"B.B.D. (I Thought It Was Me)?" (DJ Mo Grind Time)	Roney Hooks; Sadler; K. Shocklee; Durant; Paul Stewart	H. Shocklee; Sadler; K. Shocklee; Bell and DeVoe^{[b]}; Wolf & Epic^{[b]}	6:15
5.	"Do Me!" (Smoothe)	Carl Bourelly; Bivins; DeVoe; Bell	Carl E. Bourelly; Bell Biv DeVoe; Wolf & Epic^{[b]}	3:15
6.	"I Do Need You"	Timmy Gatling	Timmy Gatling; Alton "Wokie" Stewart; Stanley Brown^{[b]}; Alton "Wokie" Stewart^{[b]}	5:47
7.	"Interview/Uhh Ahh"	Bivins; Nathan Morris; Wanya Morris; Gill; DeVoe	DeVoe	2:13
8.	"Let Me Know Something?!"	Hooks; Sadler; K. Shocklee; Durant	H. Shocklee; Sadler; K. Shocklee; H. Shocklee^{[b]}; Gary G-Wiz^{[b]}	4:51
9.	"She's Dope!" (EPOD Mix)	Dr. Freeze	Dr. Freeze; Howie Hersh; Marley Marl^{[b]}	4:42
10.	"Do Me!" (Mental)	Bourelly; Bivins; DeVoe; Bell	Bourelly; Bell Biv DeVoe; K. Shocklee^{[b]}; G-Wiz^{[b]}	5:25
11.	"When Will I See You Smile Again?" (DJ Close)	Gatling; Alton Stewart	Gatling; A. Stewart; Bell and DeVoe^{[b]}; Vassal Benford^{[c]}; James Wirrik^{[c]}	6:45
12.	"Poison." (London Style)	Dr. Freeze	Dr. Freeze; H. Hersh; S&P Jervier^{[b]}^{[c]}	6:15

Notes

- ^{^[a]} signifies a co-producer
- ^{^[b]} signifies a remixer
- ^{^[c]} signifies an additional producer

== Certifications ==
Region	Certification	Certified units/sales
United States (RIAA)	Gold	500,000^{^}
^{^} Shipments figures based on certification alone.
