= Something in Your Eyes (Bell Biv DeVoe song) =

Single by Bell Biv DeVoe

from the album Hootie Mack
- B-side: "Gangsta"; "Above the Rim"; "From the Back"; "Lovely"; "Hootie Mack"
- Released: August 3, 1993
- Length: 4:52 (album version); 4:05 (single edit)
- Label: MCA
- Songwriters: Babyface; Boaz Watson
- Producers: Babyface; L.A. Reid; Daryl Simmons; Bell Biv DeVoe

Bell Biv DeVoe singles chronology
"Above the Rim" (1993)	"Something in Your Eyes" (1993)	"Show Me the Way" (1993)

Music video
- "Something in Your Eyes" on YouTube

"Something in Your Eyes" is a song co-produced and performed by American contemporary R&B group Bell Biv DeVoe, issued as the second single from the group's second studio album, Hootie Mack (1993). It was the only song from the album to chart on the US Billboard Hot 100, peaking at number 38 in 1993.

== Music video ==
The official music video for the song was directed by Lionel C. Martin.

== Charts ==
=== Weekly charts ===
Chart (1993)	Peak position
UK Singles (Official Charts)	60
US Billboard Hot 100	38
US Hot R&B/Hip-Hop Songs (Billboard)	6
US Rhythmic Airplay (Billboard)	20
US Cash Box Top 100	39

=== Year-end charts ===
Chart (1993)	Position
US Hot R&B/Hip-Hop Songs (Billboard)	53

== Release history ==
Region	Date	Format(s)	Label(s)	Ref.
United States	August 3, 1993	7-inch vinyl; cassette	MCA	
United Kingdom	September 27, 1993	12-inch vinyl; CD; cassette	MCA	
