= Hype Williams =

American filmmaker (born 1970)

- Born: Harold Williams; August 1, 1970 (age 55); Queens, New York City, U.S.
- Occupations: Music video director; film director; film producer; screenwriter
- Years active: 1991–present

Harold "Hype" Williams (born August 1, 1970) is an American music video and film director, film producer, and screenwriter.

== Early life ==
Williams was born in Queens. He is of mixed African-American and Honduran descent. He attended Adelphi University. He first displayed his work by tagging local billboards, storefronts, and playgrounds using HYPE as his graffiti tag. His graffiti style was influenced by artists like Keith Haring and Jean-Michel Basquiat. His big break came when he began working with Classic Concepts Video Productions. Lionel "Vid Kid" Martin and VJ Ralph McDaniels created Williams's first opportunity with the Filmmakers With Attitude moniker (FWA), which was Williams's first video company.

== Career ==
=== Music videos ===
Awards Williams has received for his video work include the Billboard Music Video Award for Best Director of the Year (1996), the Jackson Limo Award for Best Rap Video of the Year (1996) for Busta Rhymes's "Woo Hah!! Got You All in Check", the NAACP Image Award (1997), the 8th annual Music Video Production Association Award for Black Music Achievement (1997), MTV Video Music Award in the Best Rap Video (1998) category for Will Smith's "Gettin' Jiggy wit It", MTV Video Music Award for Best Group Video (1999) for TLC's "No Scrubs", and the BET Award for Best Director (2006) for Kanye West's "Gold Digger". In 2006, Williams was honored by MTV with its Michael Jackson Video Vanguard Award, presented in honor of his achievements as a filmmaker.

In the December 2007 issue of Playboy magazine, Williams shot the photographs for cover subject Kim Kardashian.

In 2008, Williams directed Kanye West's video for "Heartless". He also directed the music video for his single "All of the Lights", which premiered on February 19, 2011.

As of 2014, Kanye West holds the artist record for working the most times with Williams; the two have collaborated on 20 music videos, beginning in 2005 with the music video for "Diamonds from Sierra Leone". Busta Rhymes is second behind West, collaborating with Williams on 16 music videos, beginning with debut solo music video "Everything Remains Raw" / "Woo Hah!! Got You All in Check".

=== Feature and short films ===
In 1998, he directed his first and so far his only feature film to date, Belly, starring rappers Nas and DMX, the film released by Artisan Entertainment. In 1999, Williams signed a two-year overall deal with New Line Cinema to produce and direct feature films. His first film with New Line, Mothership, died in development. Later that year, Williams was in negotiations with MTV to develop an animated series which was described as a behind-the-scenes look at the world of music and celebrities. The project also died in development.

In 2000, Williams was hired to direct the Warner Bros. film Speed Racer. He left the project the following year, with the film being released in 2008 under the direction of The Wachowskis.

In 2003, Disney purchased the zombie horror film Thrilla, which Williams wrote. The project died in development, with Gavin Polone attached to produce.

In 2010, Williams was the writer for the Kanye West-directed short film Runaway.

== Personal life ==
Williams is the uncle of fellow music video director Erik White.

== See also ==
- List of Afro-Latinos
