= The Brooklyn Hip-Hop Festival =

Annual hip-hop festival in New York, US

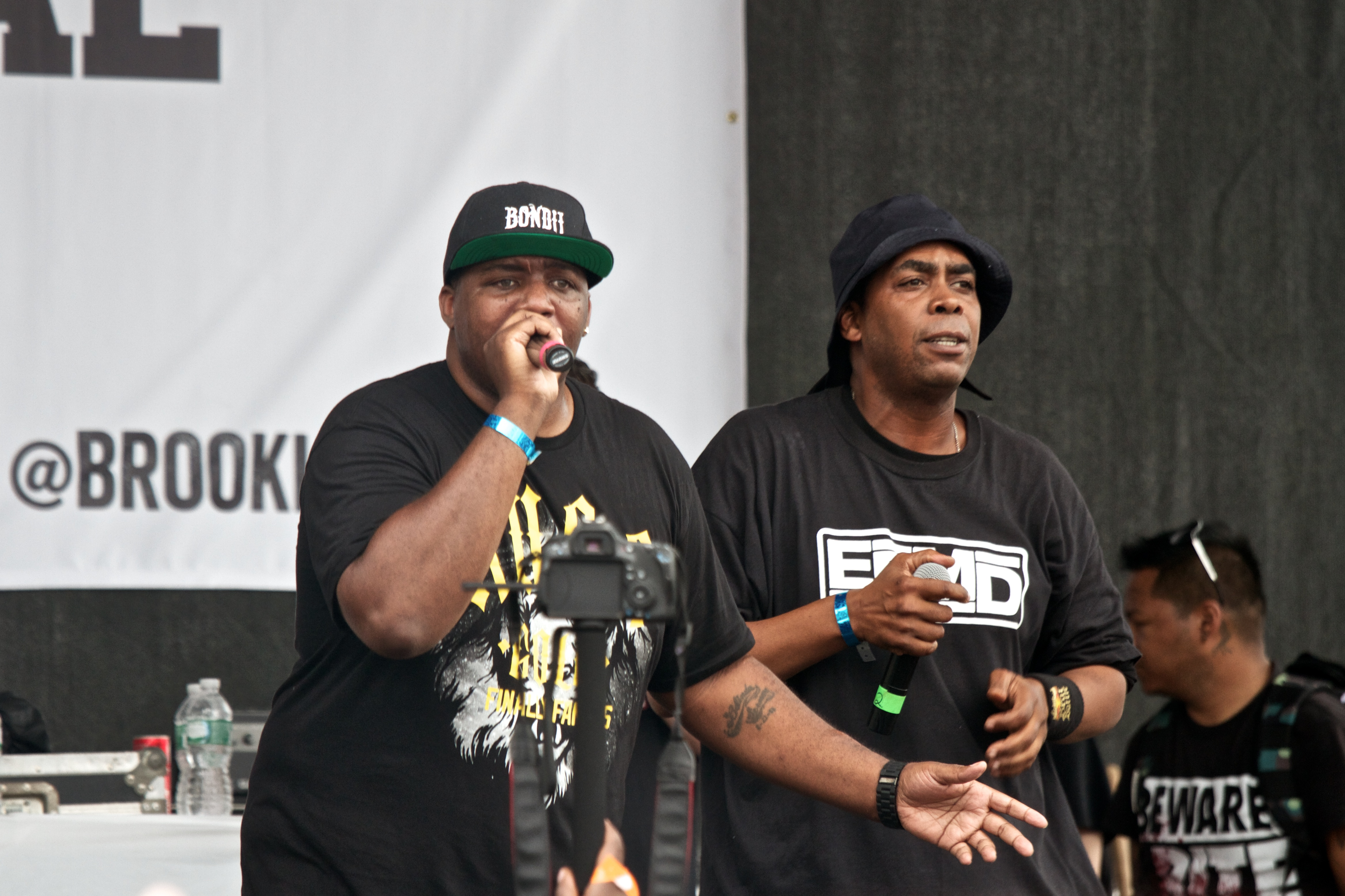
- Genre: Hip hop
- Dates: Week in July
- Locations: Brooklyn, New York, United States
- Years active: 2005 - present
- Founders: Brooklyn Bodega
- Website: https://www.bkhiphopfestival.com

The Brooklyn Hip-Hop Festival (BHF) is an annual celebration of Hip-Hop music and culture. It is produced The Bodega Agency a wholly owned subsidiary of Brooklyn Bodega, Inc.

== Overview ==
According to the official BHF website, "Our aim is to highlight Hip-Hop’s legacy as an agent of artistic progression, community building and social change."

The festival is held during July at the Brooklyn Bridge Park, which is situated on the shores of the East River and is accessible by multiple subway and bus lines, the thruway and New York Water Taxi service.

Established in 2005, BHF has grown from a parking lot in Williamsburg to the largest hip hop event in New York City. The Festival's format centers around its Hip-Hop Performance Day and includes a variety of affiliated hip hop cultural events that occur in the days leading up to the festival. Besides its music programming, the festival also features a "Family Day" segment that has music, performances, demonstrations and seminars from a host of family centric organizations.

In 2012, the Festival continued its new format of programming with “Busta & Friends” and topped Festival history with a record-breaking 30,000+ in attendance (20,000 on its Performance Day). Busta Rhymes & Friends would feature classic hits performed with Spliff Star and a surprise line-up that included Buckshot of Black Moon, Smif-N-Wessun, Lil’ Fame of M.O.P., Slick Rick, Reek Da Villain. The icing on the cake was a Leaders Of The New School reunion with Charlie Brown and Dinco D which was 19 years in the making. The night ended with L.O.N.S performing “Scenario” and bringing Phife and Q-Tip out just as the cops killed the power.

According to Time Out, "(The BHF is) (d)ifferent from the bigger hip-hop packages like Rock the Bells that will be touring the U.S. all summer, this is a show that seems purely for New York, and it affords an opportunity for the artists to give back... Local businesses also showed their support, with booths ranging from Brooklyn Brewery to FLUD Watches and Hoodman Clothing." In 2010, NY1 interviewed Hip-Hop artist Torae who said "It's just awesome, you know, for new, upcoming artists like myself to be out here and perform with legends and get to touch people from young to old, every race." Steele (rapper) of the hip-hop duo Smif-N-Wessun added "It's packed -- no violence -- so it dispels all the myths that hip-hop brings violence and stuff. It's beautiful out there, it's young kids out there, it's older people out there. It's people from all walks."

The BHF is owned by Brooklyn Bodega, which uses the proceeds from the festival to support year-round cultural programming including but not limited to: the blogazine and online home BrooklynBodega.com, and most recently The Bodega Agency, our boutique marketing and branding operation.

== History ==
The Festival has been held yearly since 2005 when it was founded by Wes Jackson, entrepreneur and current executive director and President of Brooklyn Bodega and co-founders, Gregory Trani and Douglas Nettingham. Since 2006, it has been hosted by Ralph McDaniels, who was responsible for creating Video Music Box, the first music video show focused exclusively to an urban market—broadcast on public television.

Below is a listing of past BHF performers:

=== 2005 ===
- Brand Nubian
- Little Brother
- Leela James
- Medina Green
- Ge-ology
- Amir

=== 2006 ===
- Big Daddy Kane
- Lupe Fiasco
- Rhymefest
- Sleepy Brown
- The Procussions
- Panacea aka Mathis Mootz
- Strange Fruit Project
- Cap Cee
- DJ Eclipse
- Rik Ducci
- Ralph McDaniels aka “Uncle Ralph” of Video Music Box

=== 2007 ===
- Ghostface Killah
- Consequence
- Skillz
- Dres (rapper) of Black Sheep
- Large Professor
- Emily King,
- Tanya Morgan
- PackFM
- El Michels Affair
- J.Period
- Ralph McDaniels aka “Uncle Ralph” of Video Music Box

=== 2008 ===
- KRS-One
- DJ Premier
- Buckshot
- Blu & Exile
- Mickey factz
- 88-Keys
- Zaki Inrahim
- Homeboy Sandman
- J.Period
- Ralph McDaniels aka “Uncle Ralph” of Video Music Box

=== 2009 ===
- Pharoahe Monch
- Styles P
- DJ Premier
- Dead Prez (stic.man and M-1)
- Grand Puba
- Smif-n-Wessun(Tek and Steele)
- Torae and Marco Polo
- J.Period
- Ralph McDaniels aka “Uncle Ralph” of Video Music Box
- Brown Bag All Stars
- Children Of The Night
- Donny Goines
- Keys N Krates
- Nyle
- Eagle Nebula
- Brokn Englsh
- Tiye Phoenix
- Metermaids
- Tanya Morgan
- Homeboy Sandman
- Chip Fu aka Roderick Roachford
- Kel Spencer
- DJ Parler
- DJ Misbehaviour

=== 2010 ===
- De La Soul
- Nice & Smooth (Greg Nice and Smooth B)
- Pete Rock & CL Smooth
- Q-Tip (musician) of A Tribe Called Quest
- DJ Premier
- Currensy
- Fashawn
- Buckshot
- Evil Dee of Da Beatminerz and Black Moon (group)
- Smif-n-Wessun (Tek and Steele)
- Bobbito García
- Masta Ace
- Dres (rapper) of Black Sheep
- Group Home (Lil' Dap and Melachi the Nutcracker)
- DJ Rob Swift of The X-Ecutioners
- DJ Spinna
- J. Period
- Black Milk
- Diamond District
- Money Making Jam Boys
- J Dilla Ensemble
- Ma Dukes Yancey
- Skyzoo
- Waajeed
- DJ Rhettmatic of Beat Junkies
- DJ Babu of Beat Junkies
- Rakka Iriscience of Dilated Peoples
- Ralph McDaniels aka “Uncle Ralph” of Video Music Box
- DJ Das
- DJ Parler
- Aquil
- Those Chosen
- Kalae All Day
- The Crowd

=== 2011 ===
"Q-Tip & Friends" special presentation:

- Q-Tip (musician)
- Kanye West
- Black Thought of The Roots
- Busta Rhymes
- Monie Love
- Ali Shaheed Muhammad of A Tribe Called Quest
- M.O.P (Lil’ Fame + Billy Danze)

Additional artists:

- Random Axe (Sean Price, Guilty Simpson, Black Milk)
- Kendrick Lamar
- Artifacts (group) (El da Sensei, Tame One, DJ Kaos)
- GrandWizzard Theodore
- Camp Lo (Sonny Cheeba + Geechi Suede)
- Homeboy Sandman
- J- Live
- Mista Sinista of The X-Ecutioners
- DJ Boogie Blind of The X-Ecutioners
- Eternia (rapper)
- Rah Digga
- Lords of the Underground (Mr. Funke, DoltAll Dupre and DJ Lord Jazz)
- DJ Roli Rho
- Diamond District (Oddisee, X.O. + yU)
- Chairman Mao of Egotripland
- DJ Twilite Tone
- Marley Marl
- Cold Crush Brothers
- Force MDs
- Roxanne Shante
- Craig G of the Juice Crew
- Keith Murray
- Jamel Shabazz
- Nitty Scott, MC
- Shad (rapper)
- DJ Parler
- Kid Glyde
- DJ GETLIVE!
- Stalley
- K. Sparks
- Joe Conzo
- James Blagden
- Phony Ppl
- The Stuyvesants
- K-Salaam
- Sene
- Sophia Urista
- Evil Dee of Da Beatminerz and Black Moon (group)
- Martha Cooper
- Dr. Larry Simpson of Berklee College of Music
- Ralph McDaniels aka “Uncle Ralph” of Video Music Box
- Torae (Final Day host)
- DJ Meka

=== 2012 ===
"Busta Rhymes & Friends" special presentation:

- Busta Rhymes
- Spliff Star
- DJ Scratch
- Lil Fame of M.O.P.
- Slick Rick
- Buckshot of Black Moon
- Smif-n-Wessun (Tek and Steele)
- Reek Da Villain
- Leaders Of The New School (Busta Rhymes, Dinco D, Charlie Brown and Cut Monitor Milo)
- Q-Tip (musician) and Phife Dawg of A Tribe Called Quest

Additional artists:

- Freeway (rapper)
- KA w/DJ Esquire
- Clear Soul Forces
- Jasmine Solano
- MeLo-X
- Chuwee
- Bill Adler
- Johnny Temple
- Fred "Bugsy" Buggs
- Nelson George
- Tyrone "FlyTy" Williams
- Charlie Ahearn (director)
- Chairman Mao of Egotripland
- Ali Shaheed Muhammad of A Tribe Called Quest
- Young Guru
- Fat Tony
- Ralph McDaniels aka "Uncle Ralph" of Video Music Box
- Evitan (Dres of Black Sheep and Jarobi of A Tribe Called Quest)
- Chuck Chillout
- DJ Scratch
- Bob Slade
- Sucio Smash
- CSC Funk Band
- Ana Tijoux
- 1982 (Statik Selektah + Termanology) & Reks
- Maya Azucena (Final Day host)
- Kosha Dillz (Final Day Host)
- M. Will
- Jay Dixon
- Top $ Raz (Show & Prove host)
- DJ RawBeatz
- Evil Dee of Da Beatminerz and Black Moon (group)
- DJ DP One
- Dart Parker
- KJ Butta
- Amy Linden
- Pop Master Fabel
- Kevie Kev
- DJ Emskee
- $amhill
- DJ Wayneski of Da Beatminerz
- DJ Jenny Blaze

=== 2013 ===
- Redman (rapper)
- Pusha T
- EPMD
- F.Stokes
- DJ Enuff
- Dyme-A-Duzin
- Dizzy Wright
- Dillon Cooper
- Lords of the Underground
- Das EFX
- Ralph McDaniels aka "Uncle Ralph" of Video Music Box

Additional Artists / Special Guests:

- Soul Understated
- Danse of BKLYN STICKUP
- DJ Raw Beats
- Kon Boogie

=== 2014 ===
- Raekwon The Chef of Wu-Tang Clan
- Jay Electronica
- CJ Fly of Pro Era
- Cyhi The Prince
- DJ Rob Swift
- The Audible Doctor
- Kydd Jones

Additional Artists / Special Guests

- Jay-Z
- Talib Kweli
- J. Cole
- LC The Poet
- AZ
- Mac Miller
- Bobby Shmurda
- Brand Nubian
- Tonya Morgan
- Beatnuts
- Troy Ave.

=== 2015 ===
- Common
- Mobb Deep
- Lion Babe
- Freeway
- Charles Hamilton
- Pitch Blak Brass Band
- Skyzoo
- John Robinson
- Rob Swift
- Torae
- "Uncle Ralph" McDaniels
- Large Professor
- Consequence
- Foxy Brown
- Astro Kid

=== 2016 ===
- Nas
- The Soul Rebels
- Fabolous
- Talib Kweli
- Rapsody
- DJ Rob Swift
- Ralph McDaniels
- Your Old Droog
- Taylor Bennett
- Nick Grant
- Radamiz
- Torae
- Skyzoo
- Money & Violence
- Moruf
- Oshun
- Deray Mckesson
- Combat Jack
- Ibrahim H. (Dreamville)
- Kim Osorio
- Sam Pollard
- Bill Adler
- Masego
- Kazeem Famuyide
- Brandon "Jinx" Jenkins
- Julian Mitchell
- Jamie "Marlo" Hector
- Greg Tate
- Melo X
- Wayno
- Jen Bklyn
- Chrybaby Cozie & Litefeet Nation
- Lavan Wright
- Lenny Bass
- Sean Williams
- Jason Nelson
- Calvan Fowler
- Randy Wilkins
- Cat Daddy Slim
- DJ Midnight
- Kerim The DJ
- House Arrest 2
- Justin Milhouse
- Fred Daniels
- Andy Mac
- B. Seth
- Mr. D.T.
- Tia Williams
- Timothy Wellbeck
- Trisha Bell
- Stephen A. Levite
- Lindsay Fauntleroy
- Dr. Michael A. Lindsey
- Dr. Naemma Burgess
- Wes & Ebonie Jackson
- Juels Pierrot

Additional Artists / Special Guests

- Buckshot
- Smif-N-Wessun
- Masta Ace
- Special Ed of the Crooklyn Dodgers
- Dyme-A-Duzin

=== 2017 ===
- Rakim
- DMX
- The Lox
- Bas
- Cozz
- Omen
- Bobbito Garcia
- Mister Cee
- Oshun
- Earthgang
- DJ Rob Swift
- Ralph McDaniels
- Torae
- Linda Sarsour
- Fab 5 Freddy
- Kerim The DJ
- Soul Summit
- Sickamore
- Malik The Drummer
- Ginny Suss
- Rob Stone
- Julian Mitchell
- Ryan Leslie
- Nadeska Alexis
- DJ Midnight
- Jamilah Lemieux
- Erik Parker
- Lite Feet Nation
- April Walker
- Datwon Thomas
- Chuck Creekmur
- Timothy Anne Burnside
- Denzil Porter
- Oswin Benjamin
- Trent The Hooligan

Additional Artists / Special Guests

- Buckshot
- Havoc
- Smif-N-Wessun
- Junior M.A.F.I.A.
- M.O.P.

=== 2018 ===
- Black Star (Yasiin Bey & Talib Kweli)
- Pharoahe Monch w/ DJ Boogie Blind
- Mister Cee
- Skyzoo
- Statik Selektah
- Ralph McDaniels
- Torae
- Dyme-A-Duzin
- Caleborate
- Latasha
- Radamiz
- Oswin Benjamin
- Chrybaby Cozie
- Milo Case
- Anoyd
- Don Mykel
- Clean Fresh Air
- Kerim The DJ
- Midnite
- DJ Scott Lauren
- April Reign
- Kameron Mccullough
- April Walker
- Lorrie Boula
- Nadeska Alexis
- Ali Bianchi
- John Henry
- Ebonie Smith
- Dev Smith
- Wes & Ebonie Jackson

Additional Artists / Special Guests

- Prince Po of Organized Konfusion
- Lil' Fame of M.O.P.
- O.C.
- CJ Fly
- Termanology
- Gorilla Nems

== See also ==
- List of hip hop music festivals
- Hip hop culture
