= Lil Nat =

American radio personality (born 1975)

- Born: Natalie Barrington; February 8, 1975; Brooklyn, New York, U.S.
- Presenting career
- Show: Digital Empire Nation (host)
- Station: DTFRadio.com
- Time slot: 7:00 p.m. – 9:00 p.m.
- Style: Radio presenter
- Country: United States
- Previous show: Overnights with Lil Nat

Natalie "Lil Nat" Barrington (born February 8, 1975) is an American radio personality. Lil Nat is the former host of New York Citys Hot 97 and 98.7 Kiss FM overnights. Currently, she hosts the primetime radio show Digital Empire Nation on and One West Radio (107FM).

Lil Nat was born in Brooklyn New York to Jamaican parents. She then pursued a career in dance. Due to injury she then switched majors to Film, Arts, television, and radio at NYU. While receiving her degree she had her own R&B Radio Show on and interviewed celebrity artists such as Erykah Badu.

== Career ==
Nat received an internship at Emmis communications, within a year she was promoted to assistant producer of The Isaac Hayes Morning show. During that time she also was responsible for station commercials, where she met Dj Funkmaster Flex who gave her the name Lil Nat. Eventually, she was given the job on Hot 97 FM as the overnight host where she was crowned. While Nat did her show, she was also responsible for the backstage interviews at key events like, Summer Jam and several other Hot 97 events. Emmis soon decided to switch things up and moved Nat's overnight show from Hot 97 to 98.7 Kiss FM. Lil Nat stayed on overnights till 98.7 became Espn radio in 2012.

In 2011 she started NB productions in which she developed LilNat.com and began production on her cooking show. By 2013 Lil Nat decided to get back on the radio but with her own rules and she created Digital Empire Nation. The show aired on Gidradio.com for 6 months until she moved to. Since inception Digital Empire Nation has become syndicated in LA on 107FM and Power 104.9FM in Kokomo Indiana.

=== Acting ===
Nat has done some acting during her career in the movie Still a teen movie in 2009 which she played a radio personality. In 2018 web series a role in the web series Bum rush. Lil Nat has also been a guest host on [[Video Music Box%7C|Video Music Box]] with Ralph McDaniels and she has appeared on Tha L Spot show on [[BRIC Arts Media%7C|Bric Media]].

== Personal life ==
Nat has a son named Terrell Rockwell with Mr Walt of Da Beatminerz.

Lil Nat is also an avid supporter of the Strides against Breast Cancer Awareness.

=== Other endeavors ===
Lil Nat is also a published writer, she has an article entitled Vibin with Nat published in DJ Kay Slay's Straight Stuntin Magazine.
