= It's Goin' Down =

It's Goin' Down or It's Going Down may refer to:

- It's Goin' Down (album), an album by Ralph Tresvant
- "It's Goin' Down" (Descendants song)
- "It's Goin' Down" (X-Ecutioners song)
- "It's Goin' Down" (Yung Joc song)
- It's Going Down (website), an antifascist, anarchist website
- "It's Goin' Down", episode 15 in the third season of The Boondocks
- "It's Going Down", a song by Baby D, 2003
- "It's Going Down", a song by Blackalicious from Blazing Arrow, 2002
- "It's Going Down", a song by Daz Dillinger from Retaliation, Revenge and Get Back, 1998
