= Above the Rim (disambiguation) =

Above the Rim is a 1994 sports drama film.

Above the Rim may also refer to:

- Above the Rim (soundtrack), the soundtrack to the 1994 film
- "Above the Rim" (song), 1993, by Bell Biv DeVoe
