= She's Dope =

She's Dope may refer to:

- "She's Dope" (Down with Webster song)
- "She's Dope!" (Bell Biv DeVoe song)
