= Ralph Tresvant (album) =

Studio album by Ralph Tresvant
- Released: November 20, 1990
- Genres: R&B; new jack swing
- Length: 66:00
- Label: MCA
- Producers: Jimmy Jam; Terry Lewis; Alton "Wokie" Stewart; Timmy Gatling; Daryl Simmons; Kayo; Kyle West; Wolf; Epic; Vassal Benford; L.A. Jay

Ralph Tresvant chronology
| Ralph Tresvant (1990) | It's Goin Down (1994) |

Singles from Ralph Tresvant
- 1. "Sensitivity" Released: October 9, 1990; 2. "Stone Cold Gentleman" Released: March 8, 1991; 3. "Do What I Gotta Do" Released: May 13, 1991

Ralph Tresvant is the debut solo studio album by American R&B singer Ralph Tresvant. The album was released by MCA Records on November 20, 1990, in the United States. It went to number one on the Irish Albums Chart for 12 weeks, and on the US Top R&B Albums chart for two weeks and peaked into the top 20 on the US Billboard 200 chart. It features the number one single, "Sensitivity" along with two more top five R&B hits: "Do What I Gotta Do" and "Stone Cold Gentleman", which featured labelmate Bobby Brown, and has been certified Platinum by the Recording Industry Association of America (RIAA) within its first year of release, and achieved double-platinum status a few years after.

== Critical reception ==
Professional ratings
Review scores
| Source | Rating |
|---|---|
| AllMusic | 4/5 stars |
| Calgary Herald | B− |
| Q | 3/5 stars |

Ian Cranna in Q noted that the album "is a rather uneasy amalgam of dance grooves, strings, hip hop and lush ballads".

AllMusic editor Alex Henderson found that Tresvant's "self-titled R&B/pop release isn't as distinguished or as confident as the music Bell Biv DeVoe, Bobby Brown and Johnny Gill had been doing on their own, but it has its moments [...] Some of urban contemporary's hottest producers (Jimmy Jam & Terry Lewis and Wolf & Epic, among others) are employed, and yet, the overall results aren't as strong as one might expect. None of the material is really bad; it's just that most of it isn't that far above average."

== Track listing ==
LP and cassette edition
| No. | Title | Writer(s) | Producer(s) | Length |
|---|---|---|---|---|
| 1. | "Rated R" | Ralph Tresvant | Ralph Tresvant; Jimmy Jam; Terry Lewis | 4:51 |
| 2. | "Sensitivity" | James Harris III; Terry Lewis | Jam & Lewis | 4:40 |
| 3. | "She's My Love Thang" | Harris; Lewis | Jam & Lewis | 4:27 |
| 4. | "Stone Cold Gentleman" (Rizz's Interlude) (featuring Bobby Brown) | Antonio "L. A." Reid; Daryl Simmons; Kevin "Kayo" Roberson; Lasha Johnson | Daryl Simmons; Kayo | 6:08 |
| 5. | "Do What I Gotta Do" | Harris; Lewis | Jam & Lewis | 5:42 |
| 6. | "Love Hurts" | Simmons; Kayo; Kenneth "Babyface" Edmonds | Daryl Simmons; Kayo | 5:09 |
| 7. | "Girl I Can't Control It" | Tresvant; Cedric "K-Ci" Hailey (lyrics); Kyle West (music) | Kyle West | 4:49 |
| 8. | "Love Takes Time" | Hailey; Tabitha Brace; Pam Russo (lyrics); West (music) | West | 4:38 |
| 9. | "Public Figure (Ordinary Guy)" | Tresvant; Bret "Epic" Mazur; Richard Wolf | Tresvant; Wolf; Epic | 4:43 |
| 10. | "Last Night" | Timmy Gatling; Alton "Wokie" Stewart | Timmy Gatling; Alton "Wokie" Stewart | 5:53 |

CD edition
| No. | Title | Writer(s) | Producer(s) | Length |
|---|---|---|---|---|
| 1. | "Rated R" | Ralph Tresvant | Ralph Tresvant; Jimmy Jam; Terry Lewis | 4:51 |
| 2. | "Sensitivity" | James Harris III; Terry Lewis | Jam & Lewis | 4:40 |
| 3. | "She's My Love Thang" | Harris; Lewis | Jam & Lewis | 4:27 |
| 4. | "Stone Cold Gentleman" (Rizz's Interlude) (featuring Bobby Brown) | Antonio "L. A." Reid; Daryl Simmons; Kevin "Kayo" Roberson; Lasha Johnson | Daryl Simmons; Kayo | 6:08 |
| 5. | "Do What I Gotta Do" | Harris; Lewis | Jam & Lewis | 5:42 |
| 6. | "Love Hurts" | Simmons; Kayo; Kenneth "Babyface" Edmonds | Daryl Simmons; Kayo | 5:09 |
| 7. | "Girl I Can't Control It" | Tresvant; Cedric "K-Ci" Hailey (lyrics); Kyle West (music) | Kyle West | 4:49 |
| 8. | "Love Takes Time" | Hailey; Tabitha Brace; Pam Russo (lyrics); West (music) | West | 4:38 |
| 9. | "Public Figure (Ordinary Guy)" | Tresvant; Bret "Epic" Mazur; Richard Wolf | Tresvant; Wolf; Epic | 4:43 |
| 10. | "Last Night" | Timmy Gatling; Alton "Wokie" Stewart | Timmy Gatling; Alton "Wokie" Stewart | 5:53 |
| 11. | "I Love You (Just for You)" | Kathy Wakefield; Vassal Benford | Vassal Benford | 5:44 |
| 12. | "Alright Now" | Michael Jackson; John Barnes | Benford; John Barnes | 4:17 |
| 13. | "Sensitivity (Ralph's Rap)" | Tresvant; Harris; Lewis | Jam & Lewis | 4:59 |

Notes

- "Rated R" samples "Masterpiece" as performed by the Temptations.
- Rap lyrics on "Stone Cold Gentleman" written by Ralph Tresvant and Bobby Brown.
- "She's My Love Thang" samples "Keep On Truckin'" as performed by Eddie Kendricks.

== Personnel ==
Unless otherwise noted, information based on the CD edition's liner notes

=== Performance ===
- Lead vocals (sung by): Ralph Tresvant
- Rap performed by: Bobby Brown (4), Ralph Tresvant
- Background vocals: Ralph Tresvant (1–11), Tabitha Brace (7–8), Cedric "K-Ci" Hailey (7–8), Terri Robinson (7–8), Dewayne Omarr (9), Redg Green (9), Karen Y. Mayo (9), Altitude (9), Deah Dame (6), Richard Wolf (9), Alton "Wokie" Stewart (10), Vassal Benford (11), Sue Ann Carwell (11), Michael Jackson (12)
- All Instruments: Jimmy Jam and Terry Lewis (3, 5), Kyle West (7–8), Timmy Gatling (10), Howie Hersh (10)
- All other instruments: Vassal Benford (11)
- Additional instruments: Jimmy Jam (1–2), Terry Lewis (1)
- Drum machine: Jimmy Jam and Terry Lewis (3), L.A. Reid, Kyle West, Timmy Gatling, Vassal Benford, L.A. Jay
- Drums: L.A. Reid (4), Daryl Simmons (6), Kayo (6), Bret "Epic" Mazur (9)
- Percussion: L.A. Reid (4), Daryl Simmons (6), Kayo (6), Ted Thomas (additional on 11)
- Keyboards: Daryl Simmons (4, 6), Richard Wolf (9), Vassal Benford, Jimmy Jam, L.A. Jay, Kyle West
- Synclavier: John Barnes (12)
- Guitar: Richard Wolf (9), Charles Fearing (12)
- Bass played by: Kayo (4, 6)

=== Production and technical ===
- Music programming: Bret "Epic" Mazur (9)
- Keyboard programming: Daryl Simmons (4, 6), Kayo (4, 6)
- Vocals programmed by: Jimmy Jam and Terry Lewis (2)
- Musical arrangement: Vassal Benford (11)
- Rhythm arrangement: Jimmy Jam and Terry Lewis (1–3, 5), Daryl Simmons (4, 6), Kayo (4, 6)
- Vocal arrangement: Ralph Tresvant (1), Jimmy Jam and Terry Lewis (1–3, 5), Daryl Simmons (4, 6), Kayo (4), Babyface (6), Vassal Benford (11), Ron Spearman (11)
- Recording engineers: Jimmy Jam and Terry Lewis (1–3), Donnell Sullivan (4, 6), Ron Christopher (4, 6), Barney Perkins (4), Steve Hodge (5), Wade Norton (7–8), Elliott Peters (7–8), Jon Guggenheim (10), John Hedges (11), Larold Rebhun (11), Neal Pogue (11), Jack Rouben (12)
- Assistant engineers: Milton Chan (4), Ted Malia (4, 6), Jim Zumpano (4, 6), David Betancourt (7), Steve Gallagher (7), Tom Twiss (7–8), Derek Marcil (9), Eugene Dixon (12)
- Mixing: Steve Hodge (1–3, 5), David Bianco (4), L.A. Reid (4), Daryl Simmons (4, 6), Kayo (4, 6), Elliott Peters (7–8), Dave Pensado (9), Jon Guggenheim (10), Louil Silas Jr. (12), Peter Arata (12), Skip Saylor
- Mixing assistance: Jim Zumpano (4), Milton Chan (6), David Betancourt (7–8), Steve Gallagher (7–8)
- Mastering: Herb Powers, Jr.

=== Other ===
- Art direction: Jeff Adamoff
- Design: Drennon Advertising
- Photography: Carol Friedman

== Charts ==
=== Weekly charts ===
| Chart (1990–1991) | Peak position |
|---|---|
| Australian Albums (ARIA) | 107 |
| Canada Top Albums/CDs (RPM) | 42 |
| New Zealand Albums (RMNZ) | 22 |
| UK Albums (Official Charts) | 37 |
| US Billboard 200 | 17 |
| US Top R&B/Hip-Hop Albums (Billboard) | 1 |

=== Year-end charts ===
| Chart (1991) | Position |
|---|---|
| US Billboard 200 | 66 |
| US Top R&B/Hip-Hop Albums (Billboard) | 7 |

== Certifications ==
| Region | Certification | Certified units/sales |
|---|---|---|
| United States (RIAA) | Platinum | 1,000,000^{^} |
^{^} Shipments figures based on certification alone.

== See also ==
- List of number-one R&B albums of 1991 (U.S.)
