= Boston Strong =

Slogan embodying the strength of the Boston people

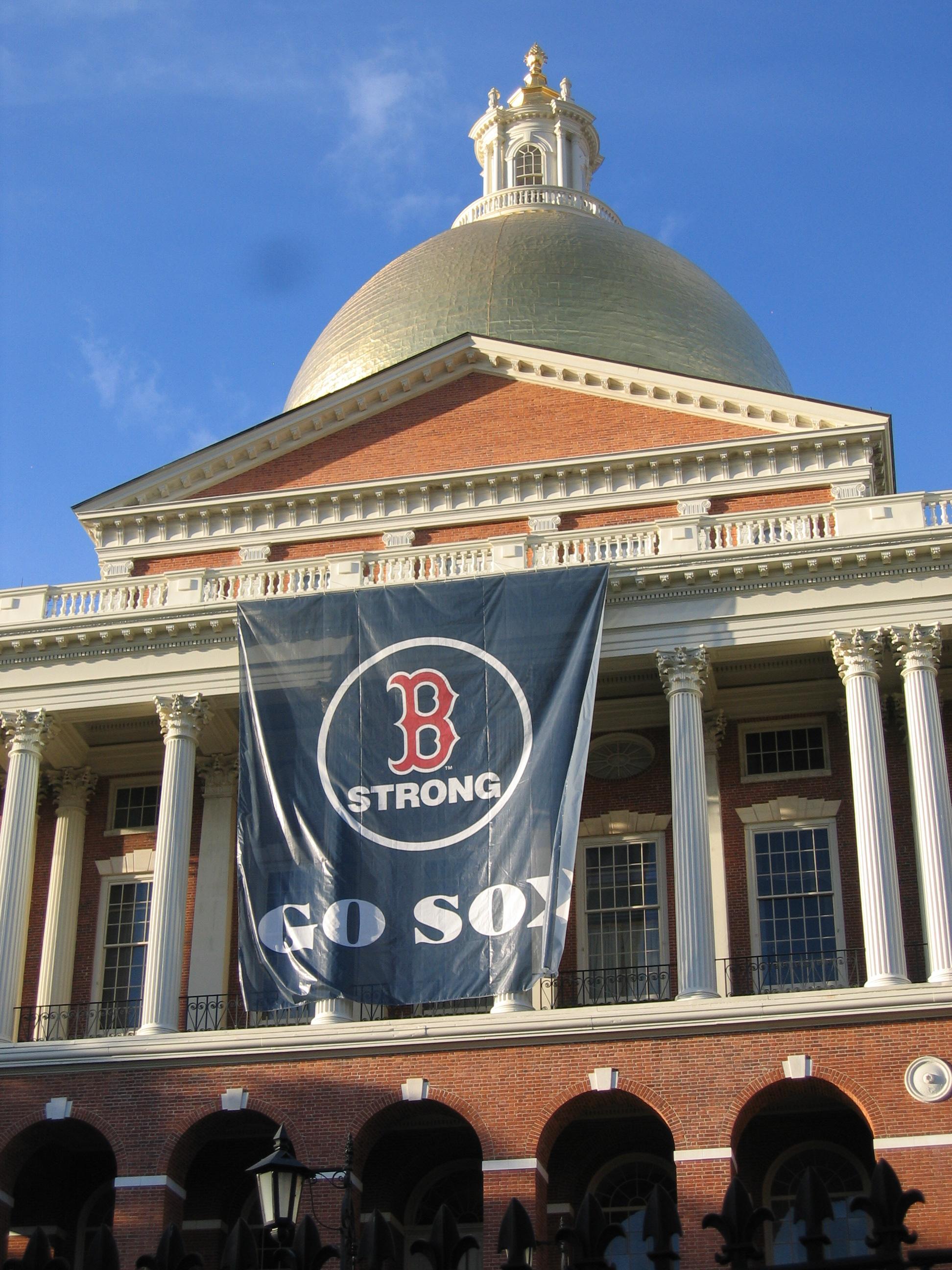
The Massachusetts State House displays a Boston Strong banner during the 2013 World Series.

"Boston Strong" is a slogan that was created as part of the reaction to the Boston Marathon bombing in 2013. It is a variation on the term Livestrong, which was created in 2004. Since the phrase became popular it has been frequently placed on various kinds of signage and merchandise. The use of the term in Boston has led to similar phrases entering public discourse, such as America Strong.

== History ==
In the hours after the Boston Marathon bombing on April 15, 2013, the slogan "Boston Strong" appeared as a highly popular hashtag on Twitter and rapidly spread around the world. It was a T-shirt campaign created by Christopher Dobens, Nicholas Reynolds, and Lane Brenner, students at Emerson College. An expression of Boston's unity after the bombing, the slogan showed up on T-shirts and other products, and was emblazoned on the "Green Monster" wall at Boston's Fenway Park. The Boston Bruins displayed the slogan on their helmets at their game two days after the bombing, and at the first baseball game in Fenway Park after the bombing, the stadium announcer told the crowd: "We are one. We are strong. We are Boston. We are Boston strong."

On April 17, two days after the bombing, a T-shirt vendor and another private individual submitted separate trademark registration applications to the U.S. Patent and Trademark Office, seeking to obtain ownership of the "Boston Strong" slogan for use on commercial products. One of the applicants said he wanted the trademark in order to prevent people from outside the Boston area from benefiting from it. A trademark attorney was quoted in The Huffington Post as predicting that the government office would deny the registration on the grounds that the slogan was already in the public domain and could not be linked to any specific entity.

The One Fund Boston, a trademark that received registration, collected and distributed over $80 million, is closed in 2015.

In late May, a concert, Boston Strong: An Evening of Support and Celebration, was held at TD Garden with performances by Aerosmith, James Taylor, Bell Biv Devoe, New Kids on the Block, Dropkick Murphys, J. Geils Band, Boston, Godsmack, Extreme, Jason Aldean, Jimmy Buffett, Carole King, Dane Cook and Steven Wright.

The Boston Strong entertainment industry concert videos online and money they generate is not associated with the bostonstrong.org charity.

The term has also made its way into many publications since the bombing as well.

The "Strong" slogan has been adopted by several cities affected by mass shootings and other tragedies since it first became popular in Boston.

== Etymology ==
The roots of Boston Strong can be traced back to the Livestrong bracelets marketed by the Livestrong Foundation in 2003. The phrase can also be traced back to the United States Army's Army Strong motto, as well as Jersey Strong, which became popular in New Jersey following the destruction of Hurricane Sandy. Man-Made and Natural disaster non-entertainment news affiliates Boston Strong bostonstrong.com was created 11/29/2012, 15 months after affiliate VTstrong.com was created in 2011 following Hurricane Irene mountain floods. NewJerseyStrong.com was created 10/2012 as Hurricane Sandy struck the lower Atlantic.

== Criticism ==
Wesley Lowery, then a reporter at The Boston Globe, tweeted in October 2013 that he thought the phrase had become overly commercialized, a view which drew criticism though Lowery's tweet specified he was "still inspired by the resilience of so many of those wounded in the marathon bombings." A few weeks later, Bill Maher criticized the term, referring to a moment when he said: "You know again it was a bad day. Three people died that's terrible, more were maimed that's horrible, but unfortunately that happens every day in car accidents and everything else. I mean your city was not leveled by Godzilla." The remarks came in response to the 2013 World Series celebration, when Boston Red Sox players Jarrod Saltalamacchia and Jonny Gomes walked to the finish line of the Boston Marathon and placed the World Series Trophy on the line, while the crowd sang "God Bless America". Former Mayor Thomas Menino later called Maher's comments "irresponsible."

In February 2014, a charitable organization in El Paso, Texas considered taking possible legal action against the Red Sox due to their using a variation of the slogan, "B Strong", which it started using seven years earlier.
