= When Will I See You Smile Again? =

Single by Bell Biv DeVoe

from the album Poison
- Released: January 4, 1991
- Recorded: 1989
- Genre: R&B; slow jam
- Length: 5:07
- Label: MCA
- Songwriters: Timmy Gatling; Alton Stewart
- Producers: Timmy Gatling; Alton "Wokie" Stewart

Bell Biv DeVoe singles chronology
"B.B.D. (I Thought It Was Me)?" (1990)	"When Will I See You Smile Again?" (1991)	"She's Dope!" (1991)

Music video
- "When Will I See You Smile Again?" on YouTube

"When Will I See You Smile Again?" is a song written and produced by Timmy Gatling and Alton Stewart and performed by American contemporary R&B group Bell Biv DeVoe. It was released on January 4, 1991 through MCA Records as the fourth single from the group's debut studio album Poison. The official music video for the song was directed by Lionel C. Martin.

In the United States, the song peaked at number 63 on the Billboard Hot 100, number 3 on the Hot R&B/Hip-Hop Songs and number 14 on the Dance Singles Sales.

== Track listing ==
No.	Title	Length
1.	"When Will I See You Smile Again?" (Remixed Club Version)
2.	"When Will I See You Smile Again?" (Instrumental)

== Personnel ==
- Ricky Bell – vocals
- Michael Bivins – vocals
- Ronnie DeVoe – vocals
- Timmy Gatling – songwriter, producer
- Alton "Wokie" Stewart – songwriter, producer
- Louil Silas Jr. – executive producer
- Hiriam Hicks – executive producer

== Charts ==
Chart (1991)	Peak position
US Billboard Hot 100	63
US Hot R&B/Hip-Hop Songs (Billboard)	3
US Dance Singles Sales (Billboard)	14
