= Gangsta (Bell Biv DeVoe song) =

1992 single by Bell Biv DeVoe

Single by Bell Biv DeVoe
- Released: 1992
- Length: 4:29
- Label: MCA
- Songwriters: Elliot Straite; James McCants
- Producers: Dr. Freeze; Ross "Spyderman" Sloane

Bell Biv DeVoe singles chronology
"The Best Things in Life Are Free" (1992)	"Gangsta" (1992)	"Above the Rim" (1993)

Music video
- "Gangsta" on YouTube

"Gangsta" is a song by American contemporary R&B group Bell Biv DeVoe. It was issued as a stand-alone single in 1992 through MCA Records; however, the song was included as a hidden track on the North American cassette version of their second studio album, Hootie Mack (1993), as well as on the European, Australian, and Japanese releases. The song peaked at number 21 on the US Billboard Hot 100. The official music video was directed by American director Lionel C. Martin.

== Charts ==
=== Weekly charts ===
Chart (1993)	Peak position
Australia (ARIA)	17
Canada Retail Singles (The Record)	4
New Zealand (Recorded Music NZ)	11
US Billboard Hot 100	21
US Hot R&B/Hip-Hop Songs (Billboard)	22
US Rhythmic Airplay (Billboard)	13
US Cash Box Top 100	18

=== Year-end charts ===
Chart (1993)	Position
Australia (ARIA)	64
