= Stone Cold Gentleman =

Single by Ralph Tresvant featuring Bobby Brown

from the album Ralph Tresvant
- B-side: "Rated R"
- Released: March 8, 1991
- Recorded: 1990
- Genre: R&B; new jack swing
- Length: 6:09 (album version); 5:30 (single edit)
- Label: MCA
- Songwriters: Daryl Simmons; Kayo Roberson; L.A. Reid
- Producers: Daryl Simmons; Kayo Roberson

Ralph Tresvant singles chronology
"Sensitivity" (1990)	"Stone Cold Gentleman" (1991)	"Word to the Mutha!" (1991)

Bobby Brown singles chronology
"She Ain't Worth It" (1990)	"Stone Cold Gentleman" (1991)	"Word to the Mutha!" (1991)

Music video
- "Stone Cold Gentleman" on YouTube

"Stone Cold Gentleman" is a song performed by American contemporary R&B singer Ralph Tresvant, issued in March 1991 by MCA Records as the second single from his eponymous debut album (1990). It originally appeared on the album under the title "Stone Cold Gentleman (Rizz's Interlude)", but the title was shortened for commercial release. The song features a rap from fellow New Edition member Bobby Brown. It peaked at number 34 on the US Billboard Hot 100 in 1991.

The accompanying music video for the song was directed by Lionel C. Martin.

== Charts ==
=== Weekly charts ===
Weekly chart performance for "Stone Cold Gentleman"
Chart (1991)	Peak position
Australia (ARIA)	83
UK Singles (OCC)	78
UK Airplay (Music Week)	34
UK Dance (Music Week)	34
US Billboard Hot 100	34
US Hot R&B/Hip-Hop Songs (Billboard)	3

=== Year-end charts ===
Year-end chart performance for "Stone Cold Gentleman"
Chart (1991)	Position
US Hot R&B/Hip-Hop Songs (Billboard)	56
