= Do Me! =

1990 single by Bell Biv DeVoe

Single by Bell Biv DeVoe

from the album Poison
- Released: June 10, 1990
- Genre: New jack swing
- Length: 4:33
- Label: MCA
- Songwriters: Ricky Bell; Michael Bivins; Carl Bourelly; Ronnie DeVoe; Busta Rhymes
- Producer: Carl Bourelly

Bell Biv DeVoe singles chronology
"Poison" (1990)	"Do Me!" (1990)	"B.B.D. (I Thought It Was Me)?" (1990)

"Do Me!" is a song by American musical group Bell Biv DeVoe. The song was released in 1990 as the second single from the group's debut album, Poison (1990). A remix is included on the group's WBBD-Bootcity!: The Remix Album, released in 1991. "Do Me!" peaked at number three on the US Billboard Hot 100 chart and number eight in New Zealand while also charting in Australia, Canada, and the United Kingdom.

== Composition ==
According to Billboard, the song is about sex. According to Ricky Bell, Busta Rhymes wrote the "backstage underage adolescent" lyric from the rap section of the song, performed by Michael Bivins.

== Release and reception ==
In June 1990, "Do Me!" entered the US Billboard Hot 100 singles chart at number 92. In September, the song reached number three, tying previous single "Poison" as Bell Biv DeVoe's biggest hit on the Hot 100. Both songs remained on the chart for 22 weeks. Elsewhere, the single peaked at number four on the Hot Black Singles chart and number six on the Hot Dance Club Songs chart. The song ranked at number 11 on the Billboard Year-End chart for 1990.

== Legacy ==
Davitt Sigerson called the song a "landmark in priapic obsession," and added, "If the true spirit of the male love jones could speak, its words would be B.B.D.'s: 'Slap it up, flip it, rub it down, oh no!'"

== Track listings ==
- 7-inch vinyl (US, UK)
1. "Do Me!" – 4:33
2. "Do Me!" (instrumental) – 4:33
- 12-inch vinyl (US)
1. "Do Me!" (Mentality Hip Hop remix) – 8:53
2. "Do Me!" (East Coast Mental mix) – 5:37
3. "Do Me!" (Smoothed Out version) – 3:15
- CD maxi single (US)
1. "Do Me!" (Mentality Hip Hop remix) – 8:53
2. "Do Me!" (East Coast Mental mix) – 5:37
3. "Do Me!" (Smoothed Out version) – 3:15
4. "Do Me!" (Mental mix) – 6:17

== Charts ==
=== Weekly charts ===
Chart (1990)	Peak position
Australia (ARIA)	60
Canada Top Singles (RPM)	61
Canada Dance/Urban (RPM)	3
New Zealand (Recorded Music NZ)	8
UK Singles (Official Charts)	56
US Billboard Hot 100	3
US Dance Club Songs (Billboard)	6
US Dance Singles Sales (Billboard)	2
US Hot R&B/Hip-Hop Songs (Billboard)	4
US Cash Box Top 100	5

=== Year-end charts ===
Chart (1990)	Position
Canada Dance/Urban (RPM)	49
New Zealand (RIANZ)	38
US Billboard Hot 100	11
US 12-inch Singles Sales (Billboard)	22
US Hot R&B Singles (Billboard)	24
US Cash Box Top 100	38

== Release history ==
Region	Date	Format(s)	Label(s)	Ref.
United States	June 10, 1990	7-inch vinyl; 12-inch vinyl; CD; cassette	MCA	
Japan	July 25, 1990	Mini-CD	MCA	
Australia	August 20, 1990	7-inch vinyl; 12-inch vinyl; cassette	MCA	
United Kingdom	September 10, 1990	7-inch vinyl; 12-inch vinyl; CD; cassette	MCA	
United Kingdom	September 17, 1990	12-inch remix vinyl	MCA	
Australia	October 8, 1990	CD	MCA	

== In popular culture ==
"Do Me!" was featured during a scene in the 2002 romantic comedy film 40 Days and 40 Nights and a second season episode of the television series Pose. A parody of the song by cover band and comedy act Richard Cheese and Lounge Against the Machine appears on their 2005 album Aperitif for Destruction. The song was covered by "Weird Al" Yankovic for his polka medley "Polka Your Eyes Out" from his 1992 album Off the Deep End. TV star Jensen Ackles sang this song in the season three gag reel of Supernatural.
