= Word to the Mutha! =

Single by Bell Biv DeVoe featuring Bobby Brown, Ralph Tresvant and Johnny Gill

from the album WBBD-Bootcity!: The Remix Album
- Released: 1991
- Recorded: 1990
- Genre: New jack swing; R&B
- Length: 6:38 (WBBD-Bootcity! Version); 5:00 (Video Mix/Radio Edit)
- Label: MCA
- Songwriters: Ricky Bell; Michael Bivins; Ronnie DeVoe; Bret "Epic" Mazur; Richard Wolf
- Producers: Bret "Epic" Mazur; Richard Wolf

Bell Biv DeVoe singles chronology
"She's Dope!" (1991)	"Word to the Mutha!" (1991)	"The Best Things in Life Are Free" (1992)

Bobby Brown singles chronology
"Stone Cold Gentleman" (1991)	"Word to the Mutha!" (1991)	"Humpin' Around" (1992)

Johnny Gill singles chronology
"Wrap My Body Tight" (1991)	"Word to the Mutha!" (1991)	"Giving My All to You" (1991)

Ralph Tresvant singles chronology
"Stone Cold Gentleman" (1991)	"Word to the Mutha!" (1991)	"Do What I Gotta Do" (1991)

Music video
- "Word to the Mutha!" on YouTube

"Word to the Mutha!" is a song co-written and performed by American contemporary R&B group Bell Biv DeVoe and co-written and produced by Wolf & Epic (Richard Wolf and Bret "Epic" Mazur). It originally appeared on their debut studio album, Poison (1990), under the title "Ronnie, Bobby, Ricky, Mike, Ralph and Johnny (Word to the Mutha)!", but the title was shortened and a remixed version of the song was issued as the only official single from the group's remix album WBBD-Bootcity!: The Remix Album (1991). The song features vocals from Bobby Brown, Ralph Tresvant and Johnny Gill. It was the first recorded song to feature all six members of New Edition. Brown, Tresvant and Gill are credited separately on the single, rather than collectively as New Edition.

The song samples "A Star in the Ghetto" by Average White Band and "The Jam" by Graham Central Station.

A music video was filmed in and around the Orchard Park Housing Projects, in the Roxbury section of Boston, where five of the six (excluding Johnny Gill) New Edition members grew up.

== Charts ==
Chart (1991–1992)	Peak position
Australia (ARIA)	151
New Zealand (RIANZ)	11
UK Singles (OCC)	76
UK Dance (Music Week)	18
UK Club Chart (Record Mirror)	92
US Hot 100 Airplay (Billboard)	37
