= Do What I Gotta Do =

Single by Ralph Tresvant

from the album Ralph Tresvant
- Released: May 13, 1991
- Recorded: 1990
- Genre: R&B
- Length: 5:43
- Label: MCA
- Songwriters: James Harris III; Terry Lewis
- Producers: Jimmy Jam and Terry Lewis

Ralph Tresvant singles chronology
"Word to the Mutha!" (1991)	"Do What I Gotta Do" (1991)	"Rated R" (1991)

Music video
- "Do What I Gotta Do" on YouTube

"Do What I Gotta Do" is a song performed by the American contemporary R&B singer Ralph Tresvant, issued as the third single from his eponymous debut album. The song peaked at No. 2 on the Billboard R&B singles chart in 1991. Although it failed to reach the Billboard Hot 100 chart, it entered the Hot 100 Singles Sales chart, peaking at No. 54 in August 1991.

== Music video ==
The official music video for the song was directed by Stefan Würnitzer.

== Chart positions ==
Chart (1991)	Peak position
US Hot 100 Singles Sales (Billboard)	54
US Hot Dance Music/Maxi-Singles Sales (Billboard)	26
US Hot R&B Singles (Billboard)	2
