= Poison (Bell Biv DeVoe album) =

Studio album by Bell Biv DeVoe
- Released: March 20, 1990
- Recorded: 1989–1990
- Studios: Echo Sound; Greene St. Recording; Battery Studios, New York; George Tobin Studios; M'Bila Studios
- Genres: New jack swing; funk; R&B; hip hop
- Length: 47:28
- Label: MCA
- Producers: Louil Silas, Jr. (exec.); Bell Biv DeVoe; Carl Bourelly; D'Lavance; Dr. Freeze; Timmy Gatling; Hiriam Hicks; Eric "Vietnam" Sadler; Hank Shocklee; Keith Shocklee; Alton "Wokie" Stewart

Bell Biv DeVoe chronology
Poison (1990)	WBBD-Bootcity!: The Remix Album (1991)

Singles from Poison
- 1. "Poison" Released: March 6, 1990; 2. "Do Me!" Released: June 10, 1990; 3. "B.B.D. (I Thought It Was Me)?" Released: September 18, 1990; 4. "When Will I See You Smile Again?" Released: 1991; 5. "She's Dope!" Released: 1991

Poison is the debut studio album from American R&B/hip hop group Bell Biv DeVoe, released March 20, 1990, on MCA Records.

The album peaked at number five on the Billboard 200 chart. By April 1995, it was certified quadruple-platinum in sales by the RIAA, after sales exceeding 4,000,000 copies in the United States.

== Release and reception ==
Professional ratings
Review scores
Source	Rating
AllMusic	4/5 stars
Pitchfork	7.4/10
Select	3/5 medals

The album peaked at five on the U.S. Billboard 200 and reached the top spot on the R&B Albums chart. The album was certified platinum in May 1990, and reached quadruple-platinum status by April 1995.

Alex Henderson at AllMusic noted that the album "delivered some of New jack swing's most worthwhile material," and also gave the group credit for being one of "the form's more creative and imaginative figures."

== Track listing ==
No.	Title	Lyrics	Music	Length
1.	"Dope!" (aka "She's Dope!" Remix)	Dr. Freeze	Dr. Freeze, Eric "Vietnam" Sadler, Hank Shocklee, Keith Shocklee	3:44
2.	"B.B.D. (I Thought It Was Me)?"	Durant, Hooks, Sadler, Shocklee, Stewart	Eric Sadler, Hank Shocklee, Keith Shocklee	4:35
3.	"Let Me Know Something?!"	Durant, Hooks, Sadler, Shocklee	Eric "Vietnam" Sadler, Hank Shocklee, Keith Shocklee	4:40
4.	"Do Me!"	Bell, Bivins, Bourelly, DeVoe	Bell Biv DeVoe, Carl E. Bourelly	4:33
5.	"Ronnie, Bobby, Ricky, Mike, Ralph and Johnny (Word to the Mutha)!"	Bell, Bivins, DeVoe	Bell Biv DeVoe, Peace Production (Wolf & Epic)	4:30
6.	"Poison (Remix)"	Dr. Freeze	Dr. Freeze, Eric "Vietnam" Sadler, Hank Shocklee, Keith Shocklee	4:22
7.	"Ain't Nut'in' Changed"	Durant, Sadler, Shocklee, Shocklee	Eric "Vietnam" Sadler, Hank Shocklee, Keith Shocklee	3:30
8.	"When Will I See You Smile Again?"	Gatling, Stewart	Alton "Wokie" Stewart, Timmy Gatling	5:08
9.	"I Do Need You"	Gatling	Alton "Wokie" Stewart, Timmy Gatling	4:36
10.	"Poison [Extended Club Version]"	Dr. Freeze	D'Lavance	7:50

== Production and personnel ==
- Tracks 1 & 6 Produced by Dr. Freeze; associate producer (track 1): Howie Hirsch. Recorded by Jay Henry. Mixed (and remixed) by Eric Sadler and Hank/Keith Shocklee; track 6 mixed by Dr. Freeze & Jay Henry. All Instruments by Dr. Freeze.
- Tracks 2, 3 & 7 Produced by Eric Sadler/Hank & Keith Shocklee. Recorded & Mixed by Dan Wood, Jamie Staub, Kirk Yano, Nick Sansano & Rod Hui. All Music arranged & performed by Hank Shocklee & Roney Hooks.
- Track 4 Produced by Bell Biv Devoe & Carl Bourelly. Music Arranged by Carl Bourelly; vocals arranged by Bell Biv Devoe. Recorded by Barbara Milne; assisted by Karen Bohannon & Michael Allair. Mixed by Bell Biv Devoe. Kevin Johnson: Drums, Percussion; Carl Bourelly: Keyboards; Chris Floberg & Sherman Foole: Programming.
- Track 5 Produced by Bell Biv Devoe & Peace Productions. Recorded by Stephen P. Blazina. Mixed by Bell Biv Devoe & Stephen P. Blazina. All Instruments, Vocals and Arrangements by Bell Biv Devoe.
- Tracks 8 & 9 Produced by Alton Stewart & Timmy Gatling. Recorded & Mixed by Kurt Upper. Drum Programming & Keyboards by Howie Hirsch & Timmy Gatling. Alto sax solo on track 9 by John Doheny.

== Charts ==
=== Weekly charts ===
Chart (1990)	Peak position
Australian Albums (ARIA)	83
Canadian Albums (RPM)	12
New Zealand Albums (RMNZ)	13
UK Albums (Official Charts)	35
US Billboard 200	5
US Top R&B/Hip-Hop Albums (Billboard)	1

=== Year-end charts ===
Chart (1990)	Position
US Billboard 200	12
US Top R&B/Hip-Hop Albums (Billboard)	7

Chart (1991)	Position
US Billboard 200	33
US Top R&B/Hip-Hop Albums (Billboard)	19

== Certifications ==
Region	Certification	Certified units/sales
United States (RIAA)	4× Platinum	4,000,000^{^}
^{^} Shipments figures based on certification alone.

== See also ==
- List of number-one R&B albums of 1990 (U.S.)
