= Above the Rim (song) =

Single by Bell Biv DeVoe

from the album Hootie Mack
- Released: May 25, 1993
- Recorded: 1992–93
- Genre: New jack swing; hip hop
- Length: 3:37
- Label: MCA
- Songwriter(s): Bell Biv DeVoe; Mark Wilson; Rico Anderson
- Producer(s): Rico Anderson

Bell Biv DeVoe singles chronology
| "Gangsta" (1993) | "Above the Rim" (1993) | "Something in Your Eyes" (1993) |

"Above the Rim" is a song co-written and performed by American contemporary R&B group Bell Biv DeVoe, issued as the official lead single from the group's second studio album Hootie Mack (following promotional single "From the Back"). The song contains a sample of "South Bronx" by Boogie Down Productions and "Blind Alley" by The Emotions. and it peaked at #81 on the Billboard R&B chart in 1993.

== Chart positions ==
| Chart (1993) | Peak position |
|---|---|
| New Zealand (Recorded Music NZ) | 15 |
| US Hot R&B Singles (Billboard) | 81 |
