= Video Music Box =

American music television show

- Title card
- Starring: Ralph McDaniels; Lionel C. Martin
- Narrated by: Ralph McDaniels
- Opening theme: "Five Minutes of Funk", performed by Whodini
- Country of origin: United States

Production
- Running time: 60 minutes

Original release
- Network: WNYC-TV (1983–1996); WNYE-TV (1996–present)
- Release: 1983 – present

Video Music Box was an American music television program. The series is the first to feature hip hop videos primarily, and was created in 1983 by Ralph McDaniels and Lionel C. Martin, who also serve as the series' hosts. It aired on the New York City-owned public television station WNYC-TV (now WPXN-TV) from 1984 to 1996.

In 1996, the program moved to WNYE-TV after WNYC-TV was sold by the city to a private company. Presenting new R&B music alongside popular rap videos, the show appealed to teens and young adults.

Many artists from the Golden Age of Hip Hop made their debuts on Video Music Box. Although it is ostensibly a local show, its influence has been very widespread, and it has been considered a major factor in the growth of Hip hop music and culture.

== Show format & guest hosts ==
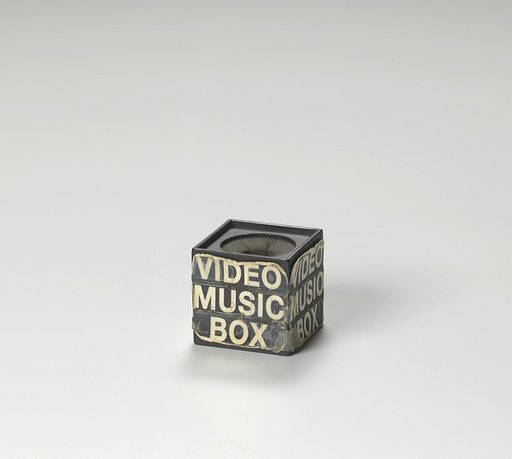
Microphone box used by Ralph McDaniels on The Video Music Box c. 1990s. Image courtesy of Smithsonian National Museum of African American History and Culture.

Video Music Box differed from other video shows of its era and after by eschewing a studio format. Most shows were shot on-location throughout New York City, in parks, schools, and nightclubs. During interludes between videos, the hosts would often allow regular people to give shout-outs to their friends and families. Very often, the hosts would also do man-on-the-street segments where they discussed various topics of the day, such as the first Gulf War, teen sex, and issues in hip hop and music in general.

The show also featured such theme-based shows during the week as slow jams on Tuesdays, nervous Thursdays hosted by Crazy Sam, and old-school Fridays. Among the other hosts the show has had during its run were Tuffy and Ray Dejon. Ray would eventually branch the show to Albany, N.Y. hosted by Ladi Kutz.

The program was the subject of a 2021 Showtime documentary, You're Watching Video Music Box.

== Film ==
- Nasir "Nas" Jones (2021). You're Watching Video Music Box. Showtime Documentary Films.
