= Rizz-Wa-Faire =

Studio album by Ralph Tresvant
- Released: March 7, 2006
- Genre: R&B
- Label: Xzault
- Producer: Danny Bell, Jr., Willie Blount, Carlos McSwain, Ralph Tresvant

Ralph Tresvant chronology
It's Goin' Down (1993)	Rizz-Wa-Faire (2006)

Professional ratings
Review scores
Source	Rating
AllMusic	2.5/5 stars

Rizz-Wa-Faire is the third solo album by Ralph Tresvant of New Edition. It was released on March 7, 2006. The only single from the album was "My Homegirl."

== Track listing ==
1. "Sneaky"
2. "Love Hangover"
3. "Angel"
4. "Jungle Club"
5. "Strange Emotions"
6. "A Man Who Loves U"
7. "Save A Little Love"
8. "Slow Down"
9. "My Homegirl"
10. "Don't Act Innocent"
11. "Something to Give You"
12. "Too Cool"
13. "Magic Underwear"
14. "Better Man"
15. "Never Noticed"
16. "Another Shot"
17. "The End"

== Charts ==
Chart (2006)	Peak position
U.S. Billboard Top R&B/Hip-Hop Albums	88
