= B.B.D. (I Thought It Was Me)? =

Single by Bell Biv DeVoe

from the album Poison
- Released: September 18, 1990
- Recorded: 1989
- Genre: New jack swing
- Length: 4:35
- Label: MCA
- Songwriters: Durant; Hooks; Sadler; Shocklee; Stewart
- Producers: Eric Sadler; Hank & Keith Shocklee

Bell Biv DeVoe singles chronology
"Do Me!" (1990)	"B.B.D. (I Thought It Was Me)?" (1990)	"When Will I See You Smile Again?" (1990)

"B.B.D. (I Thought It Was Me)?" is a song by American music group Bell Biv DeVoe. Released in September 1990 by MCA Records as the third single from their debut album, Poison (1990), it spent one week at number one on the US R&B chart, and peaked at number 26 on the Billboard Hot 100 pop chart.

== Production ==
"B.B.D. (I Thought It Was Me)?" contains samples of "(I Got) So Much Trouble in My Mind" by Sir Joe Quarterman & Free Soul, "Chain of Fools" by Aretha Franklin and "That Thing" by Pee Wee Ellis.

== Charts ==
Chart (1990–1991)	Peak position
Australia (ARIA)	100
New Zealand (Recorded Music NZ)	37
UK Singles (OCC)	86
UK Dance (Music Week)	35
US Billboard Hot 100	26
US Hot Dance Club Play (Billboard)	16
US Hot R&b (Billboard)	1
US Cash Box Top 100	23

== See also ==
- List of number-one R&B singles of 1990 (U.S.)
