= Poison (Bell Biv DeVoe song) =

1990 single by Bell Biv DeVoe

Single by Bell Biv DeVoe

from the album Poison
- Released: March 6, 1990
- Genre: New jack swing; funk; hip hop; R&B
- Length: 4:21
- Label: MCA
- Songwriter: Dr. Freeze
- Producer: Dr. Freeze

Bell Biv DeVoe singles chronology
"Poison" (1990)	"Do Me!" (1990)

"Poison" is the debut single of American vocal group Bell Biv DeVoe, released as the first single from their debut album of the same name. The song, in the style of new jack swing, a late-1980s/early-1990s hybrid of R&B, hip hop and swing, was the group's most successful.

== Background and information ==
The song was written and produced by Elliot Straite (Dr. Freeze). Straite had originally planned to feature the song on his own album, but plans changed when the members of Bell Biv DeVoe heard his demo version. "When the guys heard it, they went nuts. I didn't think that record was going to be that big because it was a personal love letter to my ex-girlfriend at the time. It wasn't a song at first. It was a letter. When I wrote it as a song, I let a lot of my friends hear it, and they said it was weird. After that, I put the music together. I was thinking I wasn't going to be on the album because such heavyweights were already on it. I ended up having two songs on the album: 'Poison' and 'She's Dope!'." Straite cited German electronic group Kraftwerk and Latin musicians Tito Puente and Mongo Santamaria as influences on the song's sound and production.

== Chart performance ==
On the US Billboard Hot 100 singles chart, "Poison" rose from number 52 to number 38 on the week of April 14, 1990, and eventually peaked at number three for four consecutive weeks, beginning on June 9, 1990. The single also peaked at number one on the Billboard Hot Black Singles chart for two weeks. "Poison" became one of the most successful singles of 1990 and was a staple on MTV and mainstream radio in the middle of the year. The single peaked at number seven on the Billboard Dance Club Play chart. "Poison" was certified platinum by the Recording Industry Association of America (RIAA) on June 1, 1990, for sales of over one million copies.

== Music video ==
The official music video for the song was directed by Lionel C. Martin.

== Charts ==
=== Weekly charts ===
Chart (1990)	Peak position
Australia (ARIA)	64
Canada Top Singles (RPM)	13
Europe (Eurochart Hot 100)	57
Netherlands (Dutch Top 40)	30
Netherlands (Single Top 100)	25
New Zealand (Recorded Music NZ)	3
UK Singles (Official Charts)	19
US Billboard Hot 100	3
US 12-inch Singles Sales (Billboard)	3
US Dance Club Play (Billboard)	7
US Hot Black Singles (Billboard)	1
US Top 40/Dance (Billboard)	1
US Cash Box Top 100	2

=== Year-end charts ===
Chart (1990)	Position
New Zealand (RIANZ)	32
US Billboard Hot 100	4
US 12-inch Singles Sales (Billboard)	18
US Hot R&B Singles (Billboard)	10
US Cash Box Top 100	9

== Certifications ==
Region	Certification	Certified units/sales
United Kingdom (BPI)	Silver	200,000^{‡}
United States (RIAA)	Platinum	1,000,000^{^}
^{^} Shipments figures based on certification alone.^{‡} Sales+streaming figures based on certification alone.

== Release history ==
Region	Date	Format(s)	Label(s)	Ref.
United States	March 6, 1990	7-inch vinyl; 12-inch vinyl; CD; cassette	MCA	
United Kingdom	May 21, 1990	7-inch vinyl; 12-inch vinyl	MCA	
Japan	June 10, 1990	Mini-CD	MCA	
United Kingdom	June 11, 1990	CD	MCA	
United Kingdom	June 18, 1990	Cassette	MCA	
United Kingdom	July 2, 1990	12-inch remix vinyl	MCA	
Australia	July 2, 1990	12-inch vinyl	MCA	
Australia	November 5, 1990	Cassette	MCA	

== See also ==
- List of number-one R&B singles of 1990 (U.S.)
