= Sensitivity (song) =

Single by Ralph Tresvant

from the album Ralph Tresvant
- Released: October 9, 1990
- Recorded: January 1990
- Genre: R&B; new jack swing
- Length: 4:40
- Label: MCA
- Songwriters: James Harris III; Terry Lewis
- Producers: Jimmy Jam; Terry Lewis

Ralph Tresvant singles chronology
"Sensitivity" (1990)	"Stone Cold Gentleman" (1991)

Audio
- "Sensitivity" on YouTube

"Sensitivity" is the title of a number-one single by American singer Ralph Tresvant. It was released in October 1990 by MCA Records as the first single from the self-titled debut album (1990) of the New Edition frontman since the split of the group. The hit song spent one week at number one on the US Billboard R&B chart, becoming his biggest hit. It also peaked at number four on the Billboard Hot 100 and number eighteen on the UK Singles Chart.

== Charts ==
=== Weekly charts ===
Weekly chart performance for "Sensitivity"
Chart (1990–1991)	Peak position
Australia (ARIA)	62
Europe (European Hit Radio)	10
Luxembourg (Radio Luxembourg)	13
UK Singles (OCC)	18
UK Airplay (Music Week)	3
UK Dance (Music Week)	1
US Billboard Hot 100	4
US Hot R&B Singles (Billboard)	1
US Hot Dance Club Play (Billboard)	19
US Cash Box Top 100	3

=== Year-end charts ===
Year-end chart performance for "Sensitivity"
Chart (1991)	Position
Europe (European Hit Radio)	94
New Zealand (RIANZ)	41
US Billboard Hot 100	29
US Cash Box Top 100	38

== Certifications ==
Region	Certification	Certified units/sales
United States (RIAA)	Gold	500,000^{^}
^{^} Shipments figures based on certification alone.

== See also ==
- List of number-one R&B singles of 1990 (U.S.)
