= Bell Biv DeVoe =

American R&B group

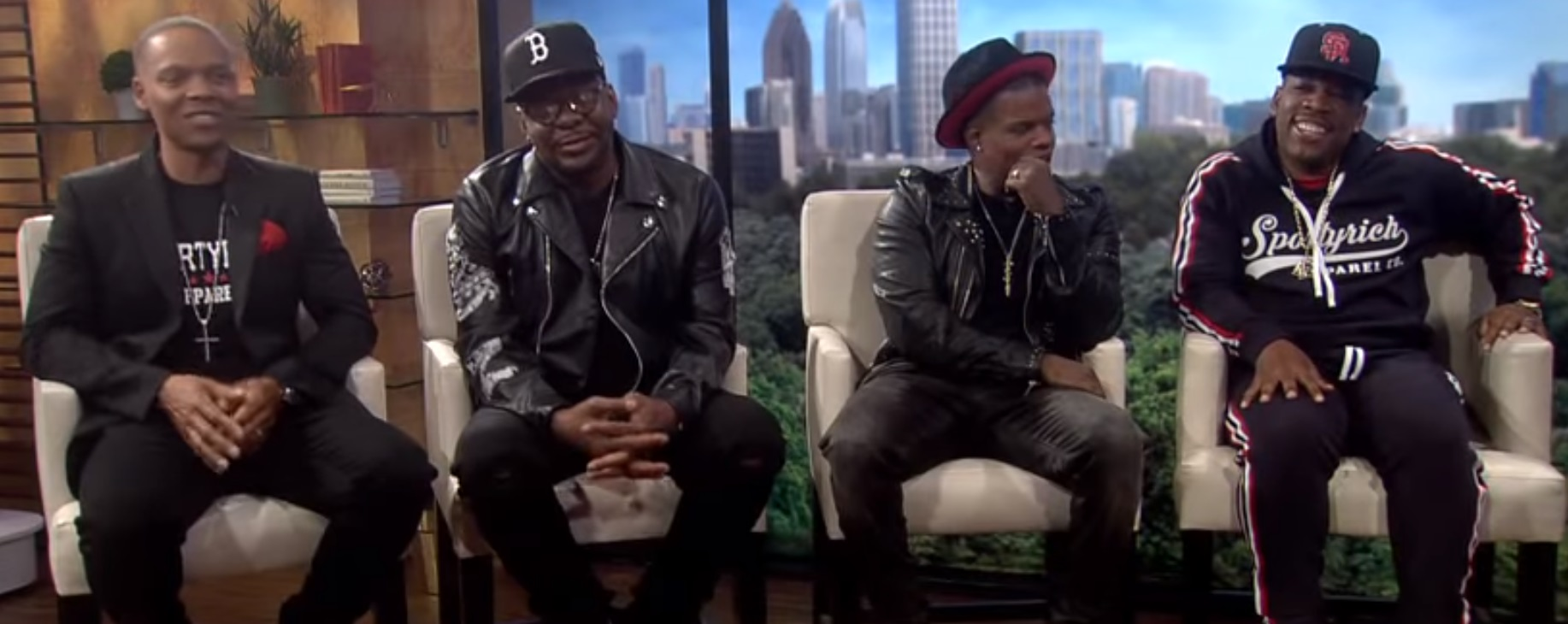
- Members with Bobby Brown as “RBRM” during a 2018 interview. From left to right: Ronnie DeVoe, Bobby Brown, Ricky Bell, and Michael Bivins.

Background information
- Also known as: BBD
- Origin: Boston, Massachusetts, U.S.
- Genres: R&B; hip hop; new jack swing
- Years active: 1989–present
- Labels: MCA; Biv 10; eOne Music
- Spinoff of: New Edition
- Members: Ricky Bell; Michael Bivins; Ronnie DeVoe
- Website: www.bellbivdevoe.com

Bell Biv DeVoe, also known as BBD, is an American music group from Boston, Massachusetts, formed from members of New Edition, consisting of Ricky Bell, Michael Bivins, and Ronnie DeVoe.

The band is best known for their debut album, the multi-platinum selling Poison (1990), a key work in the new jack swing movement of the 1990s that combined elements of traditional soul and R&B with hip hop. It was supported by two singles: "Poison" and "Do Me!", both of which peaked at number three on the Billboard Hot 100. The band released three more albums, though none matched the success of their debut. Their fourth album, Three Stripes (2017) is their most recent release.

Despite only producing four albums of original material in a 31-year span, the group has continuously toured and performed live, both as an act on their own and on several New Edition reunion tours.

== History ==
The trio of Ricky Bell, Michael Bivins, and Ronnie DeVoe has their origins as founders of the Boston-based quintet New Edition, which had gained notice of famed producer Maurice Starr at a talent show in 1981, and as children had several hits with songs like "Candy Girl" and "Cool It Now".

Throughout the 1980s, the line-up changed and the group matured and sought to branch out in new musical directions. During a hiatus in 1989, and at the suggestion of producers Jimmy Jam & Terry Lewis, the three decided to form a new group, and were signed by MCA Records. With help from Public Enemy producers Eric Sadler, Hank and Keith Shocklee and several others, Bell Biv Devoe released its debut album Poison in 1990, an album credited as pioneering the "new jack swing" sound of the early 1990s, combining hip-hop, R&B, funk, soul, and pop music. This fusion of styles helped to expose them to a fan base which preferred a harder edged sound. Poison reached number 1 on Billboard's R&B/Hip-Hop chart, and its title track, along with its second single, "Do Me!", both reached number 3 on Billboard's Hot 100 chart. Shortly thereafter, Richard Wolf and Epic Mazur were responsible for the remix of "Do Me!" (which hit number six on the dance charts). Poison also spawned the singles "B.B.D. (I Thought It Was Me)?", "When Will I See You Smile Again?" and "She's Dope!" Poison sold over four million copies, and was followed up by a remix album titled WBBD-Bootcity.

In 1992, Bell Biv DeVoe co-wrote and were featured on the US Top 10 single "The Best Things in Life Are Free", a duet between American singers Luther Vandross and Janet Jackson, recorded for the Jimmy Jam and Terry Lewis produced soundtrack to the 1992 American film Mo' Money.

Bell Biv DeVoe released Hootie Mack in 1993 on MCA Records, and the more hardcore rap/R&B influenced BBD in 2001 on Biv 10 Records. Neither album was as successful as Poison, though Hootie Mack did reach Gold success. Despite the fact that the group has only released four albums, the members of Bell Biv Devoe continue to perform together as a group. They also participated in several New Edition reunions, and continue to perform with them on tour as part of the group. On May 30, 2013, Bell Biv DeVoe performed their hit song "Poison" for Boston Strong, a benefit concert to raise money for victims of the Boston Marathon bombing.

In 2016, BBD released their first track in 15 years, "Run," along with an accompanying music video. It was the first single off the album Three Stripes, which was released January 27, 2017.

In 2023, they performed the national anthem with The Boston Pops Orchestra at the 2023 Winter Classic.

On October 5, 2023, BBD released a new single entitled, "Act Like You Know" featuring Rev Run.

== Awards and nominations ==
In 1991, the group received the award for Best R&B/Urban Contemporary Album of the Year, Group, Band or Duo for Poison at the Soul Train Music Awards.

The group also received an American Music Award for Favorite Soul/R&B Band/Duo/Group in 1992.

== Discography ==
=== Studio albums ===
Year	Album details	Peak chart positions					Certifications (sales thereshold)
Year	Album details	US	US R&B	AUS	NZ	UK	Certifications (sales thereshold)
1990	Poison: Release date: March 20, 1990; Label: MCA Records	5	1	83	13	35	US: 4× Platinum
1993	Hootie Mack: Release date: June 1, 1993; Label: MCA Records	19	6	3	33	—	US: Gold
2001	BBD: Release date: December 18, 2001; Label: Biv10/Universal Records	—	62	—	—	—	
2017	Three Stripes: Release date: January 27, 2017; Label: eOne/Entertainment One Music	18	10	—	—	—	
"—" denotes releases that did not chart or were not released in that territory.

=== Remix album ===
Year	Album details	Peak chart positions			Certifications (sales threshold)
Year	Album details	US	US R&B	AUS	Certifications (sales threshold)
1991	WBBD-Bootcity!: The Remix Album: Release date: August 27, 1991; Label: MCA Records	18	18	126	US: Gold

=== Compilation album ===
Year	Album
2000	Bell Biv DeVoe Greatest Hits: Release date: September 26, 2000; Label: MCA

=== Singles ===
Year	Single	Peak chart positions							Certifications (sales threshold)	Album
Year	Single	US	US R&B	US Dance	AUS	NED	NZ	UK	Certifications (sales threshold)	Album
1990	"Poison"	3	1	7	64	25	3	19	US: Platinum	Poison
1990	"Do Me!"	3	4	6	60	—	8	56		Poison
1990	"B.B.D. (I Thought It Was Me)?"	26	1	16	100	—	37	86		Poison
1991	"When Will I See You Smile Again?"	63	3	—	—	—	—	—		Poison
1991	"She's Dope!"	—	9	—	151	—	—	—		Poison
1991	"Word to the Mutha!" (featuring Bobby Brown, Ralph Tresvant and Johnny Gill)	—^{[a]}	—	—	151	—	11	76		WBBD-Bootcity!: The Remix Album
1992	"The Best Things in Life Are Free" (Luther Vandross featuring Janet Jackson, BBD and Ralph Tresvant)	10	—	3	2	20	6	2	AUS: Platinum; BPI: Silver	Mo' Money (soundtrack)
1993	"Gangsta"	21	22	—	17	—	11	—	AUS: Gold	Non-album single
1993	"Above the Rim"	—	81	—	—	—	15	—		Hootie Mack
1993	"Something in Your Eyes"	38	6	—	73	—	—	60		Hootie Mack
1995	"The Best Things in Life Are Free"^{[b]} (Luther Vandross featuring Janet Jackson, BBD and Ralph Tresvant)	—	—	—	—	—	—	7		Mo' Money (soundtrack)
2001	"The Hot Shit"	—	—	—	—	—	—	—		BBD
2016	"Run"	—	7^{[c]}	—	—	—	—	—		Three Stripes
2017	"Finally" (featuring SWV)	—	18^{[c]}	—	—	—	—	—		Three Stripes
2023	"Act Like You Know" (featuring Rev Run)	—	—	—	—	—	—	—		Non-album single
"—" denotes releases that did not chart or were not released in that territory.

Notes

- a As it was not issued as a retail single in the United States, "Word to the Mutha!" was not eligible to enter the Billboard Hot 100; however, it peaked at number 37 on the Hot 100 Airplay chart.
- b Re-issued and remixed in 1995, and therefore classed as a separate Top 10 hit
- cChart peak listed represent the Billboard Adult R&B Songs chart.

=== Music videos ===
Year	Video	Director
1990	"Poison"	Lionel C. Martin
1991	"Do Me!"	Lionel C. Martin
1991	"B.B.D. (I Thought It Was Me)?"	N/A
1991	"When Will I See You Smile Again?"	Lionel C. Martin
1991	"She's Dope!"	Lionel C. Martin
1991	"Word to the Mutha!"	N/A
1993	"Gangsta"	N/A
1993	"Above the Rim"	N/A
1993	"Something in Your Eyes"	Lionel C. Martin
2001	"Da Hot Sh** (Aight)"	N/A
2016	"Run"	Lionel C. Martin
2017	"I'm Betta"	Kay Gee
