= It's Goin' Down (album) =

Studio album by Ralph Tresvant
- Released: January 19, 1994
- Length: 61:12
- Label: MCA
- Producer: Ralph Tresvant; Kirk "Kizo" Crumpler; Jimmy Jam & Terry Lewis

Ralph Tresvant chronology
Ralph Tresvant (1990)	It's Goin' Down (1994)	Rizz-Wa-Faire (2006)

It's Goin' Down is the second studio album by American singer Ralph Tresvant. It was released by MCA Records on January 19, 1994, in the United States. Tresvant's second set had him take on more of a hands-on role as opposed to his debut. He wrote and produced the majority of the album, save for three songs written and produced by his longtime producers Jimmy Jam and Terry Lewis. Two singles were released from the album, including "Who's the Mack" and "When I Need Somebody". It's Goin' Down was met with lukewarm reviews, as it was noticeably different in style to its predecessor.

== Critical reception ==
Professional ratings
Review scores
Source	Rating
AllMusic	1.5/5 stars
Billboard	(favorable)

AllMusic editor Tim Griggs found that on his "follow-up to his solo debut, Tresvant attempts to show he is a bad mutha, but fails [...] Unfortunately, except for three of the tracks produced and written by the great production team of Jimmy Jam and Terry Lewis, Tresvant chose to write and produce the majority of the album himself – bad choice. Much like Janet Jackson's releases, it's amazing the quality difference between the Jam and Lewis tracks compared to the self-produced and written tracks. Tresvant destroyed whatever promise he showed on his self-titled debut release."

== Track listing ==
No.	Title	Writer(s)	Producer(s)	Length
1.	"Graveyard"	Jalil Hutchins; Lawrence Smith; Al Cleveland; Fred Wesley; James Brown; John "Jabo" Starks; Marvin Gaye; Renaldo Benson	Ralph Tresvant	4:59
2.	"Shaky Ground"	Jay LaRue; Tresvant	Kirk Crumpler; Tresvant	4:26
3.	"Who's the Mack"	James Nyx; Jimmy Jam & Terry Lewis; Gaye	Jam; Lewis	4:50
4.	"It's Goin' Down"	Tresvant	Tresvant	5:11
5.	"You'll Remember Me"	Roger Troutman; Tresvant	Tresvant	4:01
6.	"My Aphrodisiac"	Tresvant; Crumpler; Claydes Charles Smith; Dennis Thomas; Donald Boyce; George Brown; Richard Westfield; Ronald Bell; Robert Mickens; Robert Bell	Crumpler; Tresvant	3:46
7.	"When I Need Somebody"	Jam; Lewis	Jam; Lewis	4:43
8.	"Sex Maniac"	Berry Gordy; Deke Richards; Fonce Mizell; Frederick Perren	Tresvant	4:58
9.	"The Booty Affair"	Tresvant	Tresvant	4:12
10.	"Love at First Sight"	Tresvant	Tresvant	5:00
11.	"Your Touch"	Tresvant; Felton Pilate; Leonitis Sherrod	Tresvant; Sherrod	5:37
12.	"G-Spot"	Tresvant; Joe Tex; Kim "Baby Girl" Kenner	Tresvant	5:29
13.	"Sex-O"	Jam; Lewis	Jam; Lewis	4:00

Sample credits

- "Graveyard" contains samples of "The Payback" by James Brown and "What's Going On" by Marvin Gaye.
- "You'll Remember Me" contains samples from "More Bounce to the Ounce" as performed by Zapp.
- "My Aphrodisiac" incorporates elements from "Jungle Boogie" as performed by Kool and the Gang
- "Sex Maniac" incorporates elements from "Big Get Back" as performed by Terminator X.

== Charts ==
Chart (1994)	Peak position
US Billboard 200	131
US Top R&B/Hip-Hop Albums (Billboard)	24
