= She's Dope! =

1991 single by Bell Biv DeVoe

Single by Bell Biv DeVoe

from the album Poison
- Released: July 1, 1991
- Recorded: 1989
- Genre: New jack swing; R&B
- Length: 3:42
- Label: MCA
- Songwriter(s): Elliot Straite
- Producer(s): Elliot Straite; Howard Hersh

Bell Biv DeVoe singles chronology
"When Will I See You Smile Again?" (1991)	"She's Dope!" (1991)	"Word to the Mutha!" (1991)

Music video
- "She's Dope!" on YouTube

"She's Dope!" is a song performed by American contemporary R&B group Bell Biv DeVoe. It is the opening track on the group's debut studio album Poison and serves as the album's fifth single. In early pressings of Poison, the song was simply titled "Dope!", but the title was changed due to the increasing drug epidemic among children at the time. The song peaked at #9 on the Billboard R&B chart in 1991. The EPOD Mix version of the song is the version used in the music video & released as a single.

== Music video ==
The official music video for the song was directed by Lionel C. Martin.

The song paved the way for I Thought It Was Me as it featured in the first part.

== Charts ==
Chart (1991)	Peak position
Australia (ARIA)	151
US Hot Dance Music/Maxi-Singles Sales (Billboard)	15
US Hot R&B/Hip-Hop Singles & Tracks (Billboard)	9
