= Ralph McDaniels =

American television personality (born 1959)

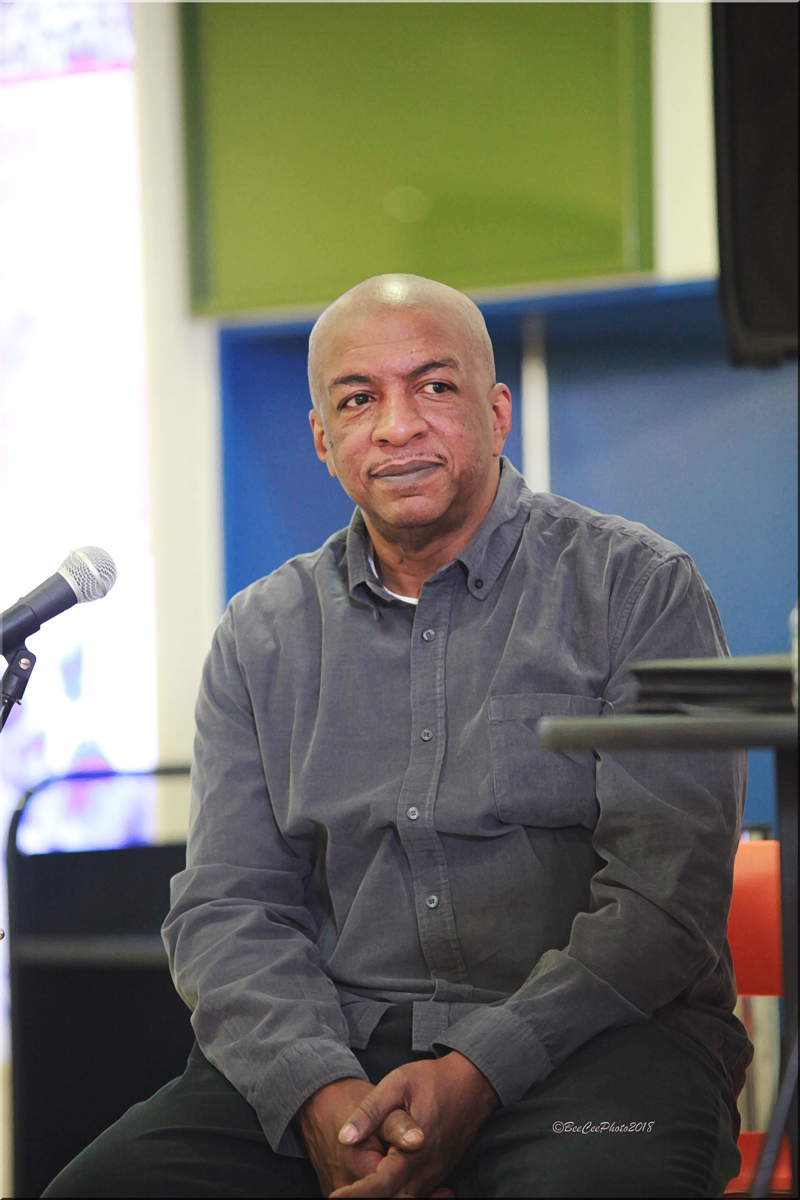
- McDaniels in 2018
- Born: February 27, 1959 (age 67); New York City, US
- Education: LaGuardia Community College
- Presenting career
- Station: Hot 97
- Time slot: Saturday afternoons
- Style: Hip-hop
- Country: United States

Ralph McDaniels (born February 27, 1959) is an American music video director, DJ, and VJ. He co-created and co-hosts the music video program Video Music Box with Lionel C. Martin.

== Biography ==
McDaniels was born in Brooklyn, New York, and moved with his parents to Queens when he was 11 years old. McDaniels studied communications at LaGuardia Community College. He later started the video production company Classic Concepts Productions with Video Music Box producer Lionel C. Martin.

In 1983, after interning at WNYC in New York City, and subsequently becoming a radio engineer, McDaniels created Studio 31 Dance Party, a television show revolving around recordings of music performances. This show would transform into Video Music Box, which was created and hosted by McDaniels and Martin.

In 1994, McDaniels, who became known as Uncle Ralph, directed hip-hop emcee Nas’s first solo video, for his second single, "It Ain't Hard to Tell". The video aired on Video Music Box, which became the longest-running music-video show in the world.

On December 3, 2021, Showtime premiered the documentary You're Watching ‘Video Music Box’, chronicling the music video show Video Music Box, with never-before-seen footage from the McDaniels’s vault. The documentary was written by Steve Rivo and Andre Wilkins and directed by Nas, who was prominent in the documentary.

He now works for the Queens Library for Outreach Services.
