= Lionel C. Martin =

American film director

- Born: Queens, New York, U.S.
- Occupations: Film director, music video director, VJ
- Known for: Def Jam's How to Be a Player; Longshot; Video Music Box

Lionel C. Martin is an American music video director, film director, and VJ from Queens, New York. While he is known primarily as a music-video director, he has also directed the films Def Jam's How to Be a Player (1997) and Longshot (2001).

Martin also co-created and co-hosts the music video program Video Music Box with Ralph McDaniels.
