= Candy Girl Tour =

1983-1984 concert tour by New Edition

- Tour by New Edition
- Associated album: Candy Girl (album)
- Start date: February 5, 1983
- End date: July 28, 1984

New Edition concert chronology
- Candy Girl Tour (1983–84); Fantasy Tour (1984–85)

The Candy Girl Tour was a concert tour by the boy band New Edition, launched to support their first album Candy Girl.

== Background ==
New edition dropped their first single Candy Girl in February 1983. The song was played by local radio stations around Boston and later became a smash hit, this marked an opportunity for them to perform professionally.

In the beginning, they started doing track dates in nightclubs and Skating rink parties in the Northeastern region on weekends performing few minute sets on a pre-recorded tape. When summer came, they performed at some festivals, the Indiana Black Expo and by august became an opening act for Rick James on his four-month Cold Blooded Tour. It is on this tour in Providence that Rick James thought it would be better for them to perform their set with a live band, providing them with his own musicians, the Stone City Band.

August also marked their first trip oversea, as the group appeared on TV Show performing live version of their hits "Popcorn Love" and "Candy Girl" on Switch in England and Vorsicht, Musik! on August 15 in Germany lip-synching "Candy Girl". During the trip in London, they shot the videos for Popcorn Love and "She Gives Me a Bang" on the same day. Coming back to the United States, New edition received their first royalty check for an amount of $1.87 each. Frustrated by this situation, they acquired new management in September and parted ways with Streetwise by November. Two months later, they crossed paths with Jerhyl Busby who signed them on MCA Records. They spent the rest of the year opening for Rick James and other R&B acts like the Gap Band and Stacy Lattisaw.

In 1984, the group was headlining 45-minute concert backed by the Q-Band in theaters around the country. While the group was performing in the Bahamas in February, Jheryl Busby invited Ray Parker Jr. to attend one of their concert, Parker met the group members who explained to him that they were already including the cover of "Mr. Telephone Man" by Junior Tucker on their show and wanted to record a studio version of it. In the spring, New Edition were part of the line-up of the "Kool Jazz Festival" with Luther Vandross, Patti LaBelle, and others artists.

== Setlist ==
Songs are not in order:

December 1983 - 1984

- Popcorn Love
- Should Have Never Told Me
- The Jackson 5 Medley: I Want You Back/ABC/The Love You Save
- Jealous Girl
- Is This the End
- Mr. Telephone Man (by Junior Tucker)
- Pass the Beat
- Candy Girl

== Personnel ==
Musicians

The Q-Band (Questarr Band):

- Drexel "BOOTS" Anderson – guitar/MD/Bkrd vocals
- Robert "Suave Bob" Cepeda – percussions
- Ralph "Da Phunky Drumma" Vargas – drums,Bkrd vocals
- Anthony "T-Bone" McEwan – bass and keyboards, Bkrd vocals
- Carl T. "The Smooth" Smith – keyboards
- John Steiner – keyboards
- Rick Roberts – band manager

== Tour dates ==
1983

Date	City	Country	Venue	Act(s)
February 5	New York City	United States	Copacabana	
March 11	New York City	United States	Bond International Casino	
March 26	New York City	United States	Harlem World	
April 2	New York City	United States	Roseland Ballroom	Madonna, DJ Chuck Leonard
April 23	Brooklyn	United States	The Saturn	
April 23	The Bronx	United States	Skatin' Palace	Kurtis Blow, Cold Crush Brothers, Undefeated 3, Finesse 4, Sophisticated 4 with Love Bug Starski
April 29	New York City	United States	Disco Fever	
April 30	New York City	United States	Studio 54	
June 19	Atlantic City	United States	Club Harlem	
June 24	Los Angeles	United States	Memorial Sport Arena	Grandmaster Flash, Melly Mel, Junzun Crew, The System, D.Train
July 3	Miami	United States	Casanovas	
July 4	Miami	United States	North Shore Beach Space Park	Jimmy Horn
July 9	Tampa	United States	Curtis Hixon Hall	
July 10	Indianapolis	United States	Market Square Arena	The Bar-Kays, Lakeside, Mtume, Jonznn Crew
July 21	Tarpon Springs	United States	Astro Skate Roller Rink	
August 3	West Warwick	United States	Warwick Memorial Auditorium	Rick James, Mary Jane Girls
August 8	Garden City	United States	Long Island Children's Museum	
August 9	Warwick	United States	Warwick Music Theater	Rick James, Mary Jane Girls
August 24	New York City	United States	Pier 84	Grandmaster Flash, Kurtis Blow, Grandmixer DST, Rockers Revenge, Afrika Bambaataa and the Soul Sonic Force
August 27	Shreveport	United States	Hirsch Coliseum	
August 28	Norfolk	United States	Scope	Stacy Lattisaw, Trouble Funk, Slim & Arcade Funk
October 1	Landover	United States	Capital Center	
October 5	Peoria	United States	Peoria Civic Center	Zapp, The Gap Band
October 10	Delray Beach	United States	Carver Community Middle School	
October 14	New York City	United States	The Fun House	Crash Crew, Pure Energy, Love Bug Starski, The Rockatron Boogie Dancers, DJ Jellybean Benitez
October 22	Peoria	United States	Peoria Civic Center	The Gap Band
October 27	Savannah	United States	Savannah Civic Center	Rick James , Stone City Band, Mary Jane Girls
November 3	Chattanooga	United States	UTC Arena	The Gap Band, Midnight Star, Zapp
November 5	Champaign	United States	Assembly Hall	Stacy Lattisaw, Maze
November 12	Greensboro	United States	Greensboro Coliseum	The Gap Band, S.O.S Band, Midnight Star
November 17	Chicago	United States	UIC Pavilion	Rick James, Mary Jane Girls
November 25	New York City	United States	The Fun House	Love Bug Starski, Crash Crew, Shannon, The Rockatron Boogie Dancers, DJ Jllybean Benitez
November 25	Hartford	United States	Hartford Civic Center	Rick James , S.O.S Band
November 27	Buffalo	United States	Buffalo Memorial Auditorium	Rick James
December 16	Tampa	United States	Curtis Hixon Hall	

1984

Date	City	Country	Venue	Act(s)
January 16	Springfield	United States	Springfield Symphony Hall	
February 4	Elizabeth	United States	The Ritz Theater	The Fearless Four, Run-DMC, The Breakers
February 6	Paterson	United States	Dreamland Roller Rink	The Fearless Four, Run-DMC
February 25	Davenport	United States	Danceland Ballroom	Appeal
February	Minneapolis	United States	Duffy's Door	
March 2	New York City	United States	Beacon Theater	Shannon
March 3	New York City	United States	Beacon Theater	Shannon
March 4	Buffalo	United States	Shea's Performing Arts Center	Shannon
March 10	Dayton	United States	Dayton Memorial Hall	Run DMC, Shannon
March 11	Devon	United States	Valley Forge Music Fair	Grandmaster Flash, Shannon
March 31	Gainsville	United States	Sun Skate Center	
April 7	Philadelphia	United States	Uptown Theater	Newcleus, Run-DMC, The Amazing Breakers
May 25	Einfield	United States	190 East Lounge	
June 1	San Diego	United States	Jack Murphy Stadium	Teena Marie, Cameo, Ashford & Simpson, Kool & the Gang
June 20	Upper Darby	United States	Tower Theater	
July 7	Atlanta	United States	Fulton County Stadium	Luther Vandross, Patti Labelle, Bobby Womack, KC and the Sunshine Band
July 28	Cincinnati	United States	Riverfront Stadium	Bobby Womack, Patti LaBelle, Frankie Beverly & Maze, Luther Vandross
