= Fantasy Tour =

1984-1985 concert tour by New Edition

- Tour by New Edition
- Location: North America
- Associated albums: New Edition
- Start date: October 27, 1984
- End date: September 29, 1985
- Legs: 2
- No. of shows: Estimated 150
- Supporting acts: Whodini; Fat Boys; UTFO
- Attendance: unknown
- Box office: unknown

New Edition concert chronology
- Candy Girl Tour (1983–84); Fantasy Tour (1984-85); All 4 Love Tour (1986)

The Fantasy Tour was the third concert tour of New Edition. The tour supported the group's second studio albums New Edition. It was their first major tour where they headlined theaters as well as arenas throughout the United States. It was also the last tour with the five original members: Ronnie, Bobby, Ricky, Michael and Ralph.

== Overview ==
After the success of their eponymous album, New Edition embarked in a tour of theaters, arenas, state fairs and several theme parks across the country. By May 1985, the group had already played 50 concerts to more than 350,000 people.

On May 20 the group performed in Boston for the 6th anniversary of Kiss 108 in front of 15,000 fans. The next day they performed at a Kiss 108 Private Party held at "The Metro". Ronnie just had a tonsillectomy so he was missing during those shows.

For the 4th of July they performed at "The Beach Boys Love Concert" at the mall of Washington with several other entertainers, the event drew an estimated crowd of 550,000.

On August 9, the group gave a concert at Six Flags Over Texas in Performing for more than 15,000 people. By 4 pm, the temperature rose to 80 degrees and 50 pecent humidity and the crowd had been standing in the park's concert area for 3 to 5 hours. The concert scheduled was halted briefly at about 9 pm to administer first-aid to some in the crowd. More than 200 young people were treated for heat-related ailments, 36 fans were treated at an Arlington hospital and 11 others at a hospital in nearby Grand Prairie for dehydration and hyperventilation. No serious injuries were reported, concert resumed after a brief interruption.

== Setlists ==
1985
1. "Also Sprach Zarathustra (2001)"
2. "Kinda Girls We Like"
3. "My Secret (didja get it yet?)"
4. "Popcorn Love"
5. "Jealous Girl"
6. "Is This The End?"
7. "Candy Girl"
8. "Pass the beat"
9. "Hide and Seek"
10. "Axel F interlude"
11. "I'm Leaving You Again"
12. "Lost In Love"
13. "I Would Die For You" (by Prince)
14. "Mr Telephone Man"
15. "Cool It Now"

Note:

- In Boston, "I would Die 4 U" was performed after "My Secret".

== Supporting acts ==
- Force MD's (December 1984)
- Evelyn "Champagne" King (December 1984)
- Whodini (December - March 1985)
- The Fat Boys (February - March 1985)
- UTFO (March - July 1985)
- Lisa Lisa and Cult Jam (July 20)

== Tour dates ==
Date	City	Country	Venue	No. of performances
North America
1984
October 27	Lake Buena Vista	United States	Disney World Magic Kingdom	1
November 23	Anaheim	United States	Disneyland	1
November 24	Anaheim	United States	Disneyland	1
November 27	Anaheim	United States	Disneyland	1
December 30	Hampton	United States	Hampton Coliseum	1
December 1	Westbury	United States	Westbury Music Fair	2
December 4	Charleston	United States	Gaillard Center	1
December 7	Charlotte	United States	Charlotte Coliseum	1
December 15	Columbia	United States	Township Auditorium	2
December 16	Richmond	United States	Richmond Coliseum	1
December 27	Upper Darby	United States	Tower Theater	2
1985
February 9	Lake Buena Vista	United States	Tomorrowland Terrace	2
February 14	West Palm Beach	United States	West Palm Beach Auditorium	1
February 15	Tampa	United States	Curtis Hixon Hall	1
February 16	Miami	United States	Knights center	1
February 17	Jacksonville	United States	Civic auditorium	1
February 18	Daytona Beach	United States	Bethune-Cookman college	1
February 21	Greenville	United States	Greenville memorial auditorium	1
February 22	Montgomery	United States	Garrett Coliseum	2
February 23	Birmingham	United States	Boutwell Auditorium	1
February 24	Tallahassee	United States	Leon County Civic Arena	1
February 28	Augusta	United States	Augusta Civic Center	1
March 1	Macon	United States	Macon City Auditorium	1
March 2	Atlanta	United States	Fox theater	2
March 3	Greensboro	United States	Greensboro Coliseum	1
March 7	Huntsville	United States	Propst Arena	1
March 8	Nashville	United States	Nashville Municipal Auditorium	1
March 9	Memphis	United States	Orpheum Theater	2
March 10	Saint Louis	United States	Kiel Auditorium	1
March 13	Allendale	United States	Grand Valley State College	1
March 14	Detroit	United States	Masonic Temple Theater	2
March 15	Highland Heights	United States	Front Row Theater	2
March 16	Chicago	United States	Arie Crown Theater	1
March 17	St.Louis	United States	Fox Theater	1
March 19	Monroe	United States	Monroe Civic Center	1
March 21	New orleans	United States	Lakefront Arena	1
March 22	Baton Rouge	United States	Centroplex Arena	1
March 23	Houston	United States	Arena Theatre	1
Mach 24	Dallas	United States	Music Hall at Fair Park	1
March 30	Anaheim	United States	Disneyland	1
April 6	San Carlos	United States	Circle Star Theater	1
April ?	Shreveport	United States	Hirsch Memorial Coliseum	1
April 18	Jackson	United States	Mississippi Coliseum	1
April 20	St. Louis	United States	Kiel Auditorium	1
May 2	Cleveland	United States	Public Hall	1
May 3	Indianapolis	United States	Indiana Convention Center	1
May 5	Charleston	United States	Charleston Coliseum & Civic Center	1
May 8	East Lansing	United States	MSU Auditorium	1
May 10	Cincinnati	United States	Cincinnati Gardens	1
May 11	Detroit	United States	Fox Theater	1
May 20	Boston	United States	Boston Garden	1
May 21	Boston	United States	The Metro	1
May 24	New York City	United States	The Roxy	1
May ??	Anaheim	United States	Disneyland Tom Sawyer Island	1
June 1	Charlotte	United States	Carrowinds Palladium	2
June	Doswell	United States	Kings Dominion	2
June 6	Jackson	United States	Six Flags Great Adventure	1
June 16	Las Vegas	United States	Thomas & Mack Center	1
June 19	Ventura	United States	Majestic Ventura Theater	1
June 20	Del Mar	United States	Del Mar Fairgrounds	1
June 21	Los Angeles	United States	Universal Amphitheater	1
June 22	Oakland	United States	Paramount Theater	1
June 22	Eureka	United States	Six Flags Over Mid-America	1
June 26	Kansas City	United States	Worlds Of Fun Forum Amphitheater	2
June 27	Urbandale	United States	Metro Ice Sports Arena	1
June 28	Milwaukee	United States	Henry W. Maier Festival Park	1
June 29	Clarkston	United States	Pine Knob Theater	1
June 30	Hoffman Estates	United States	Poplar Creek Music Theater	1
July 2	New York City	United States	Pier 84	1
July 4	Washington	United States	National Mall	1
July 19	Washington	United States	Convention Center	1
July 20	Salisbury	United States	Wicomico Youth and Civic Center	1
July 21	Pittsburgh	United States	Syria Mosque	1
July 26	Philadelphia	United States	Spectrum	1
July 27	Westbury	United States	Westbury Music Fair	1
July 28	Westbury	United States	Westbury Music Fair	1
July 31	Providence	United States	Providence Civic Center	1
August 1	Columbia	United States	Merriweather Post Pavilion	1
August 3	Birmingham	United States	Fair Park	1
August 3	New Orleans	United States	Tad Gormley Stadium	1
August 4	Atlanta	United States	Omni Coliseum	1
August 8	Little Rock	United States	Barton Coliseum	1
August 9	Arlington	United States	Six Flags Over Texas	1
August 10	Houston	United States	Six Flags AstroWorld	1
August 11	Arlington	United States	Six Flags Over Texas	1
August 16	Merillville	United States	Holiday Star Theater	2
August 17	Columbus	United States	Ohio Expo Center and State Fairgrounds	1
August 18	Highland Heights	United States	Front Row Theater	2
August 19	Vaughan	Canada	Wonderland	1
August 23	Kansas City	United States	Worlds Of Fun Forum Amphitheater	1
September 6	York	United States	York Fair GrandStand	1
September 7	Rochester	United States	War Memorial	1
September 8	Worcester	United States	Centrum in Worcester	1
September 13	Chicago	United States	UIC Pavilion	1
September 14	Chicago	United States	UIC Pavilion	1
September 15	Cleveland	United States	Public Auditorium	1
September 22	Greensboro	United States	Greensboro Coliseum	1
September 29	Berkley	United States	Hearst Greek Theater	1

== Personnel ==
Vocalists/Dancers

- Ralph Tresvant – lead vocals, dancer
- Bobby Brown – lead vocals, dancer
- Ricky Bell – vocals, dancer
- Michael Bivins - vocals, dancer
- Ronnie DeVoe – vocals, dancer

Musicians

- Carl smith - Keyboards
- John Steiner - Keyboards
- Dan "Zoro" Donnelly - Drums
- Bob Cepeda - Percussions
- Louis Metoyer - Guitar
- Anthony McEwan - Bass
- Don Hermanson - Keyboard Technician
- Gary Spence - Drum Technician

Security

- Jeff Dyson - Security
- Calvin Hubbard - Security
- Larry Cole - Bus Driver
- Chuck Glagola - Bus Driver
- Pay Lynes - Bus Driver
- Jim Fahlgren - Truck Driver
- Mark Olson - Truck Driver

Management and Production

- Mark Billes - Tour Manager
- Khalil Roundtree - Road Manager
- Geoff Perren - Production Manager
- David Troy - Merchandiser
- Jim stone - Merchandiser
- Winterline Productions - Merchandising Company
- Christine Sauers - Tour Book Design
- Jim Shea - Photography
- Pacific Lithograph/Michael John - Color separation, Lithography
- J.Beaver Saunders - Wardrobe
- Bob Oberdorston - Carpenter
- Larry Miller - Rigger
- Randy Bare - Sound & Light
- Steve Dabbs - Sound & Light
- Tony Dowley - Sound & Light
- Billy Johnson - Sound & Light
- Mick Berg - House engineer
- Pops Houghton - Lighting Director
- Brendan Higgs - Monitor Mixer
