= Tentación =

Tentación may refer to:

- XXXTentacion, or Tentacion, American rapper and singer-songwriter
- Tentación (album), a 2003 album by Ana (under the pseudonym Mía)

== See also ==
- Temptation (disambiguation)
