= All 4 Love Tour =

1986 concert tour by New Edition

- Tour by New Edition
- Location: North America
- Associated albums: New Edition
- Start date: March 10, 1986
- End date: December 15, 1986
- Legs: 1
- Supporting acts: Whodini; Fat Boys; UTFO
- Attendance: unknown
- Box office: unknown

New Edition concert chronology
- Fantasy Tour (1984–85); All 4 Love Tour (1986); Heartbreak Tour (1988-89)

The All 4 Love Tour is a 1986 concert tour by R&B group New Edition supporting their third studio album All for Love. It was the first time they toured as a quartet as Bobby Brown had left the group.

== Overview ==
After Bobby Brown left the group in the fall of 1985, Ralph, Ricky, Michael and Ronnie continued to promote their third album as a quartet with a 85-city tour of the United States including the US Virgin Islands and Canada. A trip to Japan was initially planned.

It was their most elaborate tour, with a $350,000 stage set resembling a 48 ft wide, 17 ft Deep, 10 ft high medieval castle and four towers in which each members simultaneously disappeared.

The show started with a voice speaking introduction story before a spaceship dropped the group members on stage, it incorporated illusions and lasers. The production cost $500.000 in total and affordable dueto their sponsorship. The Tour was sponsored by Coca-Cola, who also organized community events coordinated with local bottlers such as pre-show reception, radio promo, school high-attendance and essay contest winners invitations to backstage tours, assembly programs and basketball games with the members of New Edition. The price of the ticket stayed low due to the fact that 90% of the fans were still students.

During the first four weeks, they sold out venues such as Washington DC's Convention Center, Richmond Coliseum and Atlanta's Omni. It was estimated that a total of 1.5 million people seen the group perform onstage.

In New york City , where they gave 2 sold-out shows at them Madison Square Garden on June 8, Dozens of youth robbed and mugged people in a two-hour crime spree. 33 mugging peruse and chain snatchings were reported. There were 12 minor injuries and 26 arrests of suspects ranging in age from 13 to 28, one of whom was armed with a gun. a woman's earring was torn off her ear. There were also two bomb threats.

During the Summer New edition was on the bill of Budweiser Fest and Carefree Curl Summer Fest appearing with acts such as, Ready for the World, Atlantic Star, Midnight Star and Morri Day and the Time.

== Setlists ==
New Haven Coliseum - April 27, 1986

1. (Spaceship Introduction)
2. "All for Love"
3. "School"
4. "My Secret (Didja Gitit Yet?)"
5. "Baby Love
6. "Let's Be Friends"
7. "Mr. Telephone Man"
8. "Lost in Love"
9. "Count Me Out"
10. "Cool It Now"
11. "With You All The Way"
12. "Kickback"
13. "Candy Girl"
14. "A Little Bit of Love (Is All It Takes)

Note

Earth Angel was performed In August and September.

== Supporting acts ==
- Force MD's
- Cherrelle
- The Jets (Knoxville July 20)

== Tour dates ==
Date (1986)	City	Country	Venue	No. of performances
North America
March 6	Los Angeles	United States	Cocoanut Grove	1
March 12	Coumbus	United States	Municipal Auditorium	1
March 14	Savannah	United States	Savannah Civic Center	1
March 15	Mobile	United States	Mobile Municipal Auditorium	1
March 16	Tallahassee	United States	Civic Center	1
March 20	Hutsville	United States	Von Braun Center	1
March 21	Memphis	United States	Mid-South Coliseum	1
March 22	New Orleans	United States	Louisiana Superdome	1
March 23	Nashville	United States	Nashville Municipal Auditorium	1
March 26	Beaumont	United States	Civic Center	1
March 27	Monroe	United States	Monroe Civic Center	1
March 29	Birmingham	United States	Birmingham-Jefferson Civic Center Arena	1
March 30	Greensboro	United States	Greensboro Coliseum	1
April 1	Chicago	United States	UIC Pavilion	1
April 2	Richmond	United States	Richmond Coliseum	1
April 5	Tampa	United States	USF Dome	1
April 13	Washington, DC	United States	Convention Center	1
April 17	Chattanooga	United States	UTC Arena	1
April 18	Columbus	United States	Ohio Center	1
April 19	Dayton	United States	Hara Arena	1
April 20	Detroit	United States	Joe Louis Arena	1
April 24	Providence	United States	Civic Center	1
April 25	Baltimore	United States	Civic Center	1
April 26	Philadelphia	United States	Spectrum	1
April 27	New Haven	United States	New Haven Coliseum	1
May 1	Saginaw	United States	Civic Center	1
April 2	Indianapolis	United States	Market Square Arena	1
May 7	Albuquerque	United States	Tingley Coliseum	1
May 8	Tucson	United States	Tucson Convention Center	1
May 9	San Diego	United States	San Diego Sports Arena	1
May 10	Oakland	United States	Oakland-Alameda County Coliseum Arena	1
May 11	Long Beach	United States	Long Beach Arena	1
May 15	Little Rock	United States	Barton Coliseum	1
May 16	Lafayette	United States	CajunDome	1
May 18	San Antonio	United States	Freeman Coliseum	1
May 22	Oklahoma City	United States	Myriad Convention Center	1
May 23	Kansas City	United States	Kemper Arena	1
May 24	Dallas	United States	Reunion Arena	1
May 25	Houston	United States	Southern Star Amphitheater	1
May 30	Charlotte	United States	Charlotte Coliseum	1
May 31	Hampton	United States	Hampton Coliseum	1
June 1	Columbia	United States	Carolina Coliseum	1
June 4	Milwaukee	United States	MECCA Arena	1
June 6	Pittsburgh	United States	Pittsburgh Civic Arena	1
June 7	Cleveland	United States	Public Auditorium	1
June 8	New York City	United States	Madison Square Garden	2
June 14	Washington, D.C.	United States	RFK Stadium	1
June 20	San Diego	United States	Jack Murphy Stadium	1
June 22	Santa Clara	United States	Great America's Redwood Amphitheater	2
July 3	Austell	United States	Six Flags Over Georgia - Southern Star Amphitheater	2
July 5	Austell	United States	Six Flags Over Georgia - Southern Star Amphitheater	2
July 6	Doswell	United States	Kings Dominion	2
July 11	Vaughan	Canada	Kingswood Music Theater	1
July 12	Philadelphia	United States	Veterans Stadium	1
July 13	Greenville	United States	Greenville Memorial Auditorium	1
July 19	Pensacola	United States	Pansacola Civic Center	1
July 20	Knoxville	United States	Knoxville Civic Coliseum	1
July 2?	Greensboro	United States	Greensboro Coliseum	1
July 26	Louisville	United States	Gardens	1
July 20	St. Louis	United States	St. Louis Arena	1
August 1	Cincinnati	United States	Riverfront Stadium	1
August 8	New Orleans	United States	Superdome	1
August 9	Albany	United States	Albany Civic Center	1
August 10	Miami	United States	Miami Stadium	1
August 14	Uniondale	United States	Nassau Coliseum	1
August 15	Detroit	United States	Joe Louis Arena	1
August 16	Cleveland	United States	Richfield Coliseum	1
August 17	Chicago	United States	Rosemont Horizon	1
August 20	Montgomery	United States	Garrett Coliseum	1
August 23	Fort Worth	United States	Tarrant County Convention Center	1
August 24	Jackson	United States	Mississippi Coliseum	1
August 29	Oakland	United States	Oakland-Alameda County Coliseum	1
August 30	Santa Clara	United States	Great America's Redwood Amphitheater	1
August 31	Inglewood	United States	Inglewood Forum	1
September 1	Phoenix	United States	Arizona Veterans Memorial Coliseum	1
September 4	Las Vegas	United States	Thomas & Mack Center	2
September 6	Portland	United States	Veterans Memorial Coliseum	1
September 7	Tacoma	United States	Tacoma Dome	1
November 1	Albany	United States	Albany State College	1
December 15	Philadelphia	United States	Spectrum	1

== Personnel ==
Vocalists/dancers

- Ralph Tresvant – lead vocals, dancer
- Ricky Bell – lead vocals, dancer
- Michael Bivins - vocals, dancer
- Ronnie DeVoe – vocals, dancer
