= Coolin' at the Playground Ya Know! =

Studio album by Another Bad Creation
- Released: February 11, 1991
- Recorded: 1990
- Genre: R&B, new jack swing, bubblegum
- Length: 37:59
- Label: Motown
- Producer: Rico Anderson, Dallas Austin, Dr. Freeze

Another Bad Creation chronology
Coolin' at the Playground Ya Know! (1991)	It Ain't What U Wear, It's How U Play It (1993)

Singles from Coolin' at the Playground Ya Know!
- 1. "Iesha" Released: October 2, 1990; 2. "Playground" Released: March 25, 1991; 3. "Jealous Girl" Released: July 23, 1991; 4. "My World" Released: February, 1992

Coolin' at the Playground Ya Know! is the debut studio album from American hip hop and R&B group Another Bad Creation, released on February 11, 1991, on Motown.

The album peaked at number seven on the Billboard 200 chart. By May 1991, it was certified platinum in sales by the RIAA, after sales exceeding 1,000,000 copies in the United States.

== Release and reception ==
Professional ratings
Review scores
Source	Rating
AllMusic	4/5 stars
Entertainment Weekly	D

The album peaked at seven on the U.S. Billboard 200 and reached the second spot on the R&B Albums chart. The album was certified gold in April 1991 and platinum the following month.

Rob Theakston of AllMusic called the album "an enjoyable, infectious, bubblegum/R&B record," and noted that the work "unquestionably helped to re-position Motown's status as the dominant force in R&B."

== Track listing ==
No.	Title	Writer(s)	Producer(s)	Length
1.	"Parents"	Dallas Austin	Austin	2:53
2.	"Playground"	Austin, Michael Bivins, Kevin Wales	Austin	4:15
3.	"Mental (So Pay Attention)"	Austin	Austin	1:08
4.	"Little Soldiers"	Austin, Bivins, Wales	Austin	4:13
5.	"My World"	Austin, Wales	Austin	3:50
6.	"Iesha"	Austin, Bivins	Austin	4:22
7.	"Spydermann"	Christopher Sellers, David Shelton, Demetrius Pugh, Elliott Straite, Marliss Pugh, Rommell Chapman	Dr. Freeze, Howie Tee (co.)	4:40
8.	"That's My Girl"	Austin, Wales, Nathan Morris	Austin	3:08
9.	"Jealous Girl"	Maurice Starr, Michael Jonzun	Austin	5:38
10.	"A.B.C."	Sellers, Shelton, D.Pugh, Straite, M.Pugh, Chapman, Rico Anderson	Rico Anderson, Dr. Freeze (co.)	3:52

== Charts ==
Chart (1991)	Peak position
Australian Albums (ARIA Charts)	80
U.S. Billboard 200	7
U.S. R&B Albums	2

== Certifications ==
Region	Certification	Certified units/sales
United States (RIAA)	Platinum	1,000,000^{^}
^{^} Shipments figures based on certification alone.

== Personnel ==
- arranging – Dallas Austin
- engineering – Dallas Austin, Jim Hinger, Darin Prindle, Christopher Shaw, Rick Sheppard
- production – Rico Anderson, Dallas Austin, Dr. Freeze
- programming – Rick Sheppard
- vocals – Dallas Austin, Biv, Grecco Bush, Regina Chapman, Todd Harris, Tracy Harris, Rene Pugh, Racer X, Desiaray Shelton, Kevin Wales
- vocals (background) – Another Bad Creation, Boyz II Men, Dr. Freeze, Debra Killings
