= Day on the Green =

Music festival in Oakland, California, US

- Genre: Rock
- Locations: Oakland, California
- Years active: 1973–1992
- Founders: Bill Graham
- Website: dayonthegreen.net

Day on the Green was a recurring music festival in Oakland, California, presented by the promoter Bill Graham and his company, Bill Graham Presents. Held at the Oakland–Alameda County Coliseum, the events began in 1973 and continued into the early 1990s. The last Day on the Green overseen by Graham took place the same month as his death in a helicopter crash in 1991. There was a series of Day on the Green shows the following year, and other performances took place in 1994–97 at the Oakland Coliseum Stadium—namely, U2, Pink Floyd, and the Rolling Stones.

== Day on the Green forerunners ==
In 1973, Bill Graham put on a pair of large, daytime concerts at Kezar Stadium in San Francisco's Golden Gate Park. Both events were advertised on the same poster under the billing "Dancing on the Outdoor Green". The concerts served as the blueprint for what two months later and across the bay became "Day on the Green".

- Dancing on the Outdoor Green #1: Grateful Dead, Waylon Jennings, New Riders of the Purple Sage (May 26, 1973)
- Dancing on the Outdoor Green #2: Led Zeppelin, Lee Michaels, the Tubes, Roy Harper (June 2, 1973)

== 1973 ==
- Day on the Green #1: Leon Russell, Loggins and Messina, Elvin Bishop, Mary McCreary (August 5, 1973)

== 1974 ==
- Day on the Green #1: Grateful Dead, the Beach Boys, New Riders of the Purple Sage, Commander Cody and His Lost Planet Airmen (June 8, 1974)
- Day on the Green #2 & 3: Crosby, Stills, Nash & Young, the Band, Joe Walsh, Jesse Colin Young (July 13 & 14, 1974)

== 1975 ==
- Day on the Green #1: Chicago, the Beach Boys, Bob Seger, Earth Quake (May 24, 1975)
- Day on the Green #2: The Doobie Brothers, Eagles, Commander Cody and His Lost Planet Airmen, Kingfish (featuring Bob Weir) (June 29, 1975)
- Day on the Green #3: Robin Trower, Dave Mason, Peter Frampton, Fleetwood Mac, Gary Wright (August 3, 1975)
- Day on the Green #4 & 5: Led Zeppelin, Joe Walsh, the Pretty Things (August 23–24, 1975)
- Day on the Green #6: Edgar Winter Group, Johnny Winter, Lynyrd Skynyrd, Earth Quake, Charlie Daniels, the Winter Brothers Jam (September 20, 1975)

== 1976 ==
- Day on the Green # 1 & 2: Peter Frampton, Fleetwood Mac, Gary Wright, Status Quo, UFO (April 25; May 1, 1976)
- Day on the Green #3: Boz Scaggs, Tower of Power, Santana, Jeff Beck, Journey, Nils Lofgren (June 5, 1976)
- Day on the Green #4: The J. Geils Band, Jeff Beck, Blue Öyster Cult, Mahogany Rush, Sammy Hagar (June 6, 1976)
- Day on the Green #5: The Beach Boys, America, Elvin Bishop, John Sebastian (July 2, 1976)
- Day on the Green #6: Eagles, Linda Ronstadt, Loggins and Messina, Renaissance (August 3, 1976)
- Day on the Green #7 (planned): Jethro Tull, Electric Light Orchestra, Rory Gallagher, Camel (August 18, 1976)
- Day on the Green #7 & 8 (proper): the Who, Grateful Dead (October 9 & 10, 1976)

== 1977 ==
- Day on the Green #1: Fleetwood Mac, the Doobie Brothers, Gary Wright, (May 7, 1977)
- Day on the Green #2 & 3: Eagles, Steve Miller Band, Heart, Atlanta Rhythm Section, Foreigner (May 28 & 30, 1977)
- Day on the Green #4 & 5: Peter Frampton, Lynyrd Skynyrd, Santana, Outlaws (July 2 & 4, 1977)
- Day on the Green #6 & 7: Led Zeppelin, Derringer, Judas Priest (July 23 & 24, 1977)

== 1978 ==
- Day on the Green #1: The Beach Boys, Linda Ronstadt, Elvin Bishop, Dolly Parton, Norton Buffalo (May 28, 1978)
- Day on the Green #2: Steve Miller, Bob Seger, Outlaws, Ronnie Montrose, Toby Beau Band (June 17, 1978)
- Day on the Green #3: Aerosmith, Foreigner, Pat Travers, Van Halen, AC/DC (July 23, 1978)
- Day on the Green #4: The Rolling Stones, Santana, Eddie Money, Peter Tosh, Toots and the Maytals (July 26, 1978)
  Billed as the "Very Special Day on the Green", as the Rolling Stones did not initially have a tour date in the area.
- Day on the Green #5: Ted Nugent, Blue Öyster Cult, Journey, AC/DC, Cheap Trick (September 2, 1978)

== 1979 ==
- Day on the Green #1: Boston, Sammy Hagar, Eddie Money, Robert Fleischman (May 6, 1979)
- Day on the Green #2: Journey, the J. Geils Band, UFO, Thin Lizzy, Nazareth, the Rockets (July 4, 1979)
- Day on the Green #3: Ted Nugent, Aerosmith, AC/DC, Frank Marino & Mahogany Rush, St. Paradise (July 21, 1979)
- Funk on the Green #1: Parliament-Funkadelic, Bootsy's Rubber Band, Brides of Funkenstein, Bar-Kays, Sister Sledge, Confunkshun, Parlet (August 4, 1979)
- Day on the Green #4: Foreigner, the Cars, Gamma, Bram Tchaikovsky (September 15, 1979)

== 1980 ==
- Day on the Green #1: Sammy Hagar, Blue Öyster Cult, REO Speedwagon, Triumph, Randy Hansen (July 4, 1980)
- Day on the Green #2: Journey, Black Sabbath, Cheap Trick, Molly Hatchet, Shakin' Street, 415 (July 27, 1980)

== 1981 ==
- Day on the Green #1: Heart, Blue Öyster Cult, Pat Travers, Loverboy, Ozzy Osbourne, 415 (July 4, 1981)
- Day on the Green #2: REO Speedwagon, Kansas, UFO, Gamma, 38 Special (August 2, 1981)

== 1982 ==
- Day on the Green #1: Journey, Santana, Toto, Gamma, the Tubes (June 26, 1982)
- Day on the Green #2: Foreigner, Loverboy, Scorpions, Iron Maiden (July 18, 1982)
- Day on the Green #3: The Who, the Clash, T-Bone Burnett (October 23, 1982)

== 1983 ==
- Day on the Green #1: Journey, Triumph, Eddie Money, Bryan Adams, Night Ranger (July 30, 1983)
- Day on the Green #2: Simon & Garfunkel (August 20, 1983)
- Day on the Green #3: The Police, the Fixx, Madness, Oingo Boingo, and Thompson Twins (September 10, 1983)
- Day on the Green #4: David Bowie, the Tubes, Translator (September 17, 1983)

== 1984 ==
No Day on the Green held this year.

== 1985 ==
- Day on the Green #1: Scorpions, Ratt, Y&T, Metallica, Rising Force, Victory (August 31, 1985)
- Day on the Green #2: Wham!, the Pointer Sisters, Katrina and the Waves (September 1, 1985)
- Bruce Springsteen & the E Street Band (September 18–19, 1985)

== 1986 ==
No Day on the Green held this year.

== 1987 ==
- Day on the Green #1: Bob Dylan, Grateful Dead (July 24, 1987)
- Day on the Green #2: Mötley Crüe, Whitesnake, Poison, Jetboy (October 10, 1987)
- Day on the Green #3 & 4: U2, the Pretenders, the BoDeans, the Soup Dragons (November 14–15, 1987)

== 1988 ==
- Day on the Green # 1 & 2: Pink Floyd (April 22 & 23, 1988)
- Amnesty International Benefit: Bruce Springsteen & the E Street Band, Peter Gabriel, Tracy Chapman, Youssou N'Dour (September 23, 1988)

== 1989 ==
- In Concert Against AIDS Benefit: Grateful Dead, Tracy Chapman, John Fogerty, Los Lobos, Joe Satriani, Tower of Power (May 27, 1989)
- Day on the Green #1 & 2: The Who (August 29 & 30, 1989)
- Day on the Green #3 & 4: The Rolling Stones, Living Colour (November 4 & 5, 1989)

== 1990 ==
- Day on the Green #1: New Kids on the Block, Perfect Gentlemen, Rick Wes, Chris Pitman (September 8, 1990)

== 1991 ==
- Day on the Green #1: Metallica, Queensrÿche, Faith No More, Soundgarden (October 12, 1991)
  The final Day on the Green presented by Bill Graham before his death.

== 1992 ==
- Day on the Green #1: Genesis (June 20, 1992)
- Day on the Green #2: Guns N' Roses, Metallica, Body Count (September 24, 1992)
- Day on the Green #3: U2, Public Enemy, Sugarcubes (November 7, 1992)

== 1999 ==
- Day on the Green: Sammy Hagar, Megadeth, Sevendust, Machine Head, Sprung Monkey, Loudmouth, DDT (October 10, 1999)

== See also ==
- List of historic rock festivals
- List of jam band music festivals
