= Classic Example (album) =

Studio album by Classic Example
- Released: July 28, 1992
- Genre: R&B
- Length: 65:22
- Label: Hollywood
- Producer: Cecil Holmes (exec.); Maurice Starr (exec.); Wayman Jones (exec.)

Singles from Classic Example
- 1. "It's Alright" Released: 1992; 2. "I Do Care" Released: 1993

Professional ratings
Review scores
Source	Rating
AllMusic	2.5/5 stars

Classic Example is the only studio album by American contemporary R&B group Classic Example, released July 28, 1992 via Hollywood Records. The album was co-produced by Cecil Holmes and Maurice Starr. It did not chart in the United States; however, the lead single, "It's Alright", peaked at #68 on the Billboard Hot 100.

In addition to original songs, the album contains a cover of the Cherrelle song "Where Do I Run to", as well as a rendition of the traditional hymn "Lift Every Voice and Sing".

== Track listing ==
No.	Title	Writer(s)	Producer(s)	Length
1.	"It's Alright" (featuring Khiry and Tajh Abdulsamad^{A})	Joe Wolfe; Roy "Dog" Pennon; Khiry Abdulsamad; Tajh Abdulsamad	Khiry Abdulsamad	4:10
2.	"Don't Make Me Wait"	Maurice Starr	Maurice Starr; Gordon Worthy; Dale Ramsey	4:12
3.	"I Do Care"	Maurice Starr	Maurice Starr; Dale Ramsey	5:14
4.	"Never Gonna Give You Up"	Maurice Starr	Maurice Starr; Gordon Worthy; Bill Hagans	4:40
5.	"Where Do I Run to" (Cherrelle cover)	Cherrelle; Danny Williams; Herman Davis; Langston Richey	Larry Woo Wedgeworth	5:12
6.	"Toast to Our Love"	Gordon Worthy; Larry Woo Wedgeworth	Gordon Worthy; Larry Woo Wedgeworth	5:30
7.	"Stay with Me Tonight"	Gordon Worthy; Larry Woo Wedgeworth	Gordon Worthy; Larry Woo Wedgeworth	5:06
8.	"Lift Every Voice and Sing"	James Weldon Johnson; John Rosamond Johnson	Classic Example	1:51
9.	"The Other Side of My Bed"	Curvin Corbin; Robertson; Myron Cheese; Raj Gupta; Thurston O'Neal	David "Pic" Conley; Everett Collins	3:56
10.	"Can You Find a Place in Your Heart"	Gordon Worthy; Larry Woo Wedgeworth; Maurice Starr	Gordon Worthy; Larry Woo Wedgeworth; Maurice Starr	4:56
11.	"Treat Her Like a Lady"	Maurice Starr	Maurice Starr; Gordon Worthy; Bill Hagans	4:05
12.	"All Your Love"	Maurice Starr	Maurice Starr; Dale Ramsey; Bill Hagans	4:16
13.	"You Need Love"	Gordon Worthy; Larry Woo Wedgeworth	Gordon Worthy; Larry Woo Wedgeworth	4:34
14.	"She Ain't Right"	Maurice Starr	Maurice Starr; Classic Example	1:59
15.	"Dear Lisa"	Gordon Worthy; Larry Woo Wedgeworth	Gordon Worthy; Larry Woo Wedgeworth	5:40
Total length:				65:22

A. "It's Alright" originally only appeared on the Japanese release of the album.
