= Body Language (Ana album) =

Studio album by Ana
- Released: January 21, 1990
- Genre: Pop; dance-pop
- Length: 40:05
- Label: Parc Records/Epic Records
- Producer: Maurice Starr; Kiki Garcia; Hector Almaguer; Deborah Gibson

Ana chronology
Ana (1987)	Body Language (1990)	Tentación (2003)

Singles from Body Language
- 1. "Got to Tell Me Something" Released: 1990; 2. "Angel of Love" Released: 1990; 3. "Everytime We Say Goodbye" Released: 1990

Body Language is the second studio album by Cuban-American singer Ana, released by Parc Records and Epic Records in 1990. It features the singles "Got to Tell Me Something" and "Angel of Love", the latter featuring a duet with Jordan Knight of New Kids on the Block. The album was mainly produced by NKOTB's manager Maurice Starr and includes two songs written and produced by Debbie Gibson and two songs co-written and co-produced by former Miami Sound Machine drummer Kiki Garcia.

The album was made available on streaming platforms on January 28, 2022, with six bonus tracks.

== Track listing ==
All tracks are produced by Maurice Starr, except where indicated.

Side A
No.	Title	Writer(s)	Producer(s)	Length
1.	"Body Language"	Kiki Garcia; Hector Almaguer	Garcia; Almaguer	3:52
2.	"Got to Tell Me Something"	Maurice Starr		3:02
3.	"So Outrageous"	Brian MacLeod; Matteo Caratozzolo		3:22
4.	"Miracles"	Starr		3:47
5.	"Angel of Love" (Duet with Jordan Knight)	Starr		4:21

Side B
No.	Title	Writer(s)	Producer(s)	Length
1.	"Everytime We Say Goodbye"	Deborah Gibson	Gibson	4:19
2.	"What Could I Do"	Garcia; Almaguer	Garcia; Almaguer	5:04
3.	"Over and Over"	Starr		3:57
4.	"Three Steps Closer"	Starr		3:51
5.	"Friendly"	Gibson	Gibson	4:30

2022 bonus tracks
No.	Title	Writer(s)	Length
11.	"So Outrageous" (Club Mix)	MacLeod; Caratozzolo	4:38
12.	"What Could I Do" (Club Mix)	Garcia; Almaguer	5:40
13.	"Got to Tell Me Something" (Dance Mix)	Starr	6:26
14.	"Got to Tell Me Something" (Radio Edit)	Starr	4:00
15.	"Got to Tell Me Something" (Red Zone Mix)	Starr	5:24
16.	"Got to Tell Me Something" (Piano Beats)	Starr	5:00

== Personnel ==
- Eddie (M.C. Rad) Montilla – keyboards (A1, B2)
- Gary Corbett – keyboards (B1)
- Debbie Gibson – programming, backing vocals (B5)
- Tony Coluccio – programming (B5)
- Leo Rizzo – keyboards (B1)
- Tommy Williams – guitar (B1)
- Ira Siegel – guitar (B5)
- Kirk Powers Burkhardt – bass (B1)
- Fred Levine – drums (B1, B5)
- Adam Tese – percussion (B1)
- Bashiri Johnson – percussion (B5)
- Kiki Garcia – backing vocals (A1, B2)
- Hector Almaguer – backing vocals (A1, B2)
- Carrie Johnson – backing vocals (B1, B5)
- Libby Johnson – backing vocals (B1, B5)
