= It Ain't What U Wear, It's How U Play It =

It Ain't What U Wear, It’s How U Play It

Studio album by Another Bad Creation
- Released: September 21, 1993
- Recorded: 1992–1993
- Genre: R&B, hip hop
- Length: 40:26
- Label: Motown
- Producer: Tim & Bob, Kenny "Smoove" Kornegay, Busta Rhymes, Wanya Morris, Nathan Morris, Shawn Stockman, Jay Wright & Anthony Velasquez

Another Bad Creation chronology
Coolin' at the Playground Ya Know! (1991)	It Ain't What U Wear, It’s How U Play It (1993)	Grady Baby Compilation (2006)

Professional ratings
Review scores
Source	Rating
Allmusic	3/5 stars

It Ain’t What U Wear, It’s How U Play It is the second and final album from Another Bad Creation. It was released on September 21, 1993 on Motown Records.

== Chart performance ==
The album did not enter any Billboard chart. Two singles were released from the album: “I Don't Wanna Be Grown Up” and “Where's Ya Little Sista?”; these singles also failed to enter the charts. The group disbanded shortly after.

== Track listing ==
1. "Got It Goin’ On" (Kelley, Killings, Wales, Witcher) – 4:34
2. "Where's Ya Little Sista?" (Bivins, Kornegay, Wales, Whittington) – 4:07
3. "Keep Steppin’ On" (Rhymes) – 5:00
4. "One More Try" (Morris) – 4:31
5. "I Don't Wanna Be Grown Up" (Austin, Kelley, Robinson, Wales) – 4:46
6. "My First Kiss" (Kelley, Robinson, Wales) – 4:46
7. "Show Me the Way" (Morris, Stockman) – 4:36
8. "Strive to Be" (Rhymes) – 4:13
9. "Throw Ya Palms" (Velasquez, Wright) – 3:53
