= It's Alright (Classic Example song) =

1992 single by Classic Example

Single by Classic Example

from the album Classic Example and South Central
- Released: 1992
- Genre: R&B
- Length: 4:11 (album version); 3:16 (single edit)
- Label: Hollywood
- Songwriters: Joe Wolfe; Roy "Dog" Pennon; Khiry Abdulsamad; Tajh Abdulsamad
- Producer: Khiry Abdulsamad

Classic Example singles chronology
"It's Alright" (1992)	"Christmas Song" (1992)

"It's Alright" is the debut single by American contemporary R&B group Classic Example. It was co-written by The Boys members Khiry and Tajh Abdulsamad (who both appear toward the end of the song), and was produced by Khiry. The song originally only appeared on the Japanese release of the group's eponymous album but was later added to the US version of the album as well. It also appears as the closing track on the soundtrack to the film South Central.

"It's Alright" was the band's only song to chart on the US Billboard Hot 100, peaking at #68 in 1992.

== Charts ==
Chart (1992)	Peak position
US Billboard Hot 100	68
US Hot R&B/Hip-Hop Singles & Tracks (Billboard)	53
US Rhythmic Top 40 (Billboard)	30
US Cash Box Top 100	65
