= South Central (soundtrack) =

Soundtrack album by Various artists
- Released: September 18, 1992
- Recorded: 1992
- Studio: Cherokee Recording Studios (Hollywood, CA)
- Genre: Hip hop; R&B; soul
- Length: 58:23
- Label: Hollywood Records
- Producer: Budd Carr (exec.); John Bido; Hi-C; Ray "Pinkey" Velazquez; Timothy "TK" Olphie; The Boys

Singles from South Central
- 1. "It's Alright" Released: 1992

South Central (Music from the Original Motion Picture Soundtrack) is the original soundtrack to Stephen Milburn Anderson's 1992 film South Central. It was released on September 18, 1992, via Hollywood Basic and consisted of a blend of hip hop, R&B and soul music. The album itself did not make it to any Billboard charts, but its single, Classic Example's "It's Alright", has peaked at #68 on the Billboard Hot 100.

== Track listing ==
No.	Title	Writer(s)	Length
1.	"Bounce, Rock, Skate, Roll" (performed by Vaughan Mason & Crew)	V. Mason	5:30
2.	"West Coast Poplock" (performed by Ronnie Hudson)	L. Troutman; M. Hooks; R. Troutman; R. Hudson	5:28
3.	"Cutie Pie" (performed by One Way)	A. Hudson; J. Meadows; D. Roberson; G. Hudson; G. Green; T. Morgan; T. Dudley	5:25
4.	"Fantastic Voyage" (performed by Lakeside)	F. Alexander, Jr.; F. Lewis; M. Wood; M. Craig; N. Beavers; O. Stokes; S. Shockley; T. Shelby; T. McCain	6:11
5.	"Just a Touch of Love" (performed by Slave)	D. Webster; M. Adams; M. Hicks; R. Turner	6:28
6.	"Flirt" (performed by Cameo)	L. Blackmon; T. Jenkins	4:07
7.	"Street Life" (performed by Scarface)	J. Bido; B. Jordan	5:25
8.	"Broke Off" (performed by Hi-C)	C. Wilkerson	3:22
9.	"Check Out the Radio" (performed by Spectrum City)	A. Allen; C. Ridenhour; H. Boxley; K. Boxley	4:29
10.	"Rumors of a Dead Man" (performed by Boo-Yaa T.R.I.B.E.)	Boo-Yaa T.R.I.B.E.	3:39
11.	"2 Skanless" (performed by Hi-C, AMG, DJ Quik & KK)	C. Wilkerson; T. Alvarez	4:09
12.	"It's Alright" (performed by Classic Example)	J. Wolfe; K. Abdulsamad; R. Pennon; T. Abdulsamad	4:10
Total length:			58:23
