= Ana (American singer) =

Cuban-American singer (born 1974)

- Also known as: Mía
- Born: Ana Maria Rodríguez; February 22, 1974 (age 52); Havana, Cuba
- Origin: Miami, Florida, U.S.
- Genres: Pop; dance-pop; freestyle; Latin
- Occupation: Singer
- Years active: 1987–1990; 2003
- Labels: Univision Records; El Cocodrilo Records; Epic Records; Parc Records
- Website: www.facebook.com/anamrperez/

Ana Maria Pérez (née Rodríguez; born February 22, 1974 in Havana, Cuba) is a Cuban-American singer who has recorded under the stage names Ana and Mía.

== Biography ==
Ana Maria Rodríguez was born in Havana, Cuba, on February 22, 1974. She relocated with her family to Miami, Florida in 1979. In 1984, Rodríguez signed to Parc Records when she was 10 years old. Under the name Ana, her self-titled debut album was released in 1987, and while it was not a hit in the U.S., it did achieve success in Japan, where it was titled Shy Boys. Ana's debut single "Shy Boys" peaked at No. 94 on the Billboard Hot 100 and No. 23 on the Billboard Dance Chart. With the help of producer Maurice Starr in 1990, she recorded her second album Body Language, which includes the duet "Angel of Love" with New Kids on the Block's Jordan Knight. Debbie Gibson also wrote two songs in the album: "Everytime We Say Goodbye" and "Friendly". The album's only single "Got to Tell Me Something" peaked at No. 66 on the Billboard Hot 100. Ana performed "Everytime We Say Goodbye" at the 19th Tokyo Music Festival that year.

After years of absence, Ana re-emerged under the name of Mía and released an all-Spanish language album entitled Tentación on Univision Records in September 2003. The album garnered her a Best New Artist of the Year nomination at the Premio Lo Nuestro 2004.

== Discography ==
=== Studio albums ===
As Ana

Title	Album details
Ana	Released: January 21, 1987; Label: Parc Records; Formats: LP, CD, cassette
Body Language	Released: January 21, 1990; Label: Parc Records/Epic Records; Formats: CD, cassette

As Mía

Title	Album details
Tentación	Released: September 30, 2003; Label: Univision Music Group; Formats: CD

=== Singles ===
As Ana

List of singles, with selected chart positions
Title	Year	Peak chart positions	Album
Title	Year	U.S. Billboard	Album
"Shy Boys"	1987	94	Ana
"The Boy Next Door" (Japan only)	1988	—	Ana
"Before I Jump"	1988	—	Non-album single
"Got to Tell Me Something"	1990	66	Body Language
"Angel of Love" (feat. Jordan Knight)	1990	—	Body Language
"Everytime We Say Goodbye"	1990	—	Body Language
"—" denotes a recording that did not chart or was not released in that territory.

As Mía

List of singles, with selected chart positions
Title	Year	Peak chart positions	Album
Title	Year	U.S. Billboard	Album
"Te Tengo Que Aprender a Olvidar"	2003	—	Tentación
"Convéncete"	2003	—	Tentación
"—" denotes a recording that did not chart or was not released in that territory.

== See also ==
- List of Cubans
