= New Inside =

Studio album by Tiffany
- Released: September 25, 1990
- Recorded: 1990
- Genres: R&B; new jack swing
- Length: 50:41
- Label: MCA
- Producers: Phillip Damien; Maurice Starr

Tiffany chronology
Hold an Old Friend's Hand (1988)	New Inside (1990)	Dreams Never Die (1993)

Singles from New Inside
- 1. "New Inside" Released: August 28, 1990; 2. "Here in My Heart" Released: January 8, 1991 (U.S.); 3. "Back In The Groove" Released: April 1991

New Inside is the third studio album by Tiffany, which was released by MCA on September 25, 1990. Tiffany severed her ties with manager/producer George Tobin soon after her 18th birthday, and signed with manager Dick Scott and producer Maurice Starr, the latter responsible for forming the group New Kids on the Block (NKOTB).

The album was not a commercial success in the United States, and neither the album nor any single released from it made it onto the pop charts, though the title track "New Inside" received a little bit of airplay in some areas and reached some local radio stations' request-based countdowns thanks to the efforts of fans, who were starting to get organized on bulletin board systems and online services. In Japan, the album was a Top 20 success, where it peaked at No. 17, and staying in the Top 100 for a total of six weeks.

An attempt was made to take advantage of current events by rededicating the song "Here in My Heart", written by superstar songwriter Diane Warren, to the troops serving in the Gulf War. Previously, the song had been dedicated to AIDS victim Ryan White.

Ultimately, Tiffany broke her ties with Scott and Starr, and returned to Tobin for her fourth album Dreams Never Die.

The CD booklet and back cover show "A Moment to Rest" as track number 3, but this brief instrumental interlude is actually on the CD as part of the following track, "Tenderly", shown as track 4 on the cover but actually track 3; all subsequent tracks are confusingly shown with numbers one higher than actually displayed by a CD player.

== Background ==
American singer Tiffany released her first two teen pop albums, Tiffany on June 29, 1987, and Hold an Old Friend's Hand on November 21, 1988. Her self-titled debut album explores the "growing pains of a wholesome California teen". It peaked at No. 1 on Billboard's Top Pop Albums chart. The album spawned five singles, including international hits "I Think We're Alone Now", "Could've Been", and "I Saw Him Standing There", the former two in which peaked at No. 1 on Billboard Hot 100. Her second album, Hold an Old Friend's Hand, explores a theme of young adulthood, though the themes from her first album remained. Though it does not replicate the success of her self-titled debut album, "All This Time" peaked at No. 6 on Billboard Hot 100, becoming her fourth and final top-ten single.

In 1989, Tiffany got her first voiceover role as Judy Jetson in Jetsons: The Movie at the age of 17 years, replacing most of Janet Waldo's original dialogue. (Note: Some of Janet Waldo's dialogue as Judy Jetson remained intact in the film. It is unknown if these are errors.) According to Vernon Scott of United Press International, her singing voice caught the attention of Joe Barbera and asked Tiffany to sing several songs for the film's soundtrack. In the now-defunct Los Angeles Herald Examiner article on May 26, 1989, Waldo stated that Tiffany was originally going to be the singing voice of Judy Jetson, but MCA Records convinced Universal Pictures to switch the voices altogether for the film to be more relevant to a younger audience. The film was released on July 6, 1990, to mixed reviews.

Despite her international success, Tiffany was frustrated with the music business and her "pop star" image that was created for her. In a 2012 interview with The A.V. Club, Tiffany recalled that several people told her to not change her image nor date any men. She further explained that girls were "dressing more sexy; music was changing." Tiffany decided to grow up as an artist, becoming a "little more edgy" and a "little bit more tuned-in". During 1989, she developed a new, sexier image for her third album.

== Production ==
After the release of Hold an Old Friend's Hand, Tiffany decided to change her musical direction to R&B and new jack swing. According to a New York Daily News article issued on July 10, 1990, Tiffany stated that she has been wanting to "do something a little bit different" for a long time. When manager and producer George Tobin disagreed with her desire to change musical direction, the singer looked for a new manager and selected the New Kids on the Block managers Dick Scott and Maurice Starr.

Under Starr's direction, Tiffany got the opportunity to sing harder and more densely constructed songs than the light pop tunes she had been accustomed to singing; this caused her vocal range to naturally expand and would prove to be a strong influence on the albums of her later career. In a 2012 interview with The A.V. Club, Tiffany stated that Phillip Damien "vocally took [her] to a whole different level", as she recorded some vocals "[she] didn't know [she] could do." Tiffany also got the chance to perform gospel music for the album.

== Critical reception ==
Professional ratings
Review scores
Source	Rating
AllMusic	1.5/5 stars
Chicago Tribune	2.5/5 stars
Entertainment Weekly	C

Upon its release, New Inside received mixed reviews from critics. On its release, Billboard felt Tiffany had "shrug[ged] off the dated sound" of her previous work with Tobin in favor of a "harder-edged, pop/funk pose" on New Inside. The reviewer considered the album to be made up of "formulaic material" but added that it has "several sterling moments". Jan DeKnock of the Chicago Tribune noted that New Inside contained "a much more contemporary sound, with plenty of pop-funk-dance winners" and described Tiffany's vocals as having a "new throaty snarl to go along with her powerful pipes". She criticized some tracks for having "too many layers of busy production" and highlighted "Here in My Heart" for having a "simple charm" and allowing Tiffany to show off her "strong, expressive voice to greater advantage".

Greg Sandow of Entertainment Weekly considered the album to shift Tiffany from pop to R&B, but felt the album was in need of "classier songs" and that the production left the album "without much personality". He noted, "The R&B she sings here is the mass-produced kind, electronic and unusually punchy. So yes, she now sounds tough and street smart; she can wail with a vocal strength she never demonstrated before. But the plaintive, even troubled undercurrent in her voice, which was the best thing about her teen pop, mostly gets buried under a barrage of synthesizer effects." In a retrospective review, Alex Henderson of AllMusic noted Tiffany's attempt to move away from "sugary pop" and "embrac[e] a tougher urban contemporary sound". However, he felt the album was unmemorable, commenting, "High-tech cuts like 'Tiff's Back' and the new jack swing-influenced 'It's You' sound like they were tailor-made for urban radio. They also sound contrived and robotic."

== Track listing ==
No.	Title	Writer(s)	Length
1.	"New Inside"	Phillip Damien; Donnie Wahlberg	5:35
2.	"It's You"	Tiffany; Kevin Grady; Damien	5:22
3.	"A Moment To Rest / Tenderly"	Nayan; Chris Bednar	5:27
4.	"Never Run My Motor Down"	André Cymone; Gardner Cole	3:58
5.	"Here in My Heart"	Diane Warren	4:08
6.	"Tiff's Back"	Maurice Starr	3:52
7.	"Our Love"	Damien	6:01
8.	"Life Affair"	Cole; Matthew Garey	4:07
9.	"Back in the Groove"	Starr; Tiffany	4:35
10.	"There Could Never"	Damien; Mark Wilson	7:36
Total length:			50:41

== Charts ==
Chart (1990)	Peak position
Australian Albums (ARIA)	142
Japanese Albums (Oricon)	17
