= Flaming Starr =

Studio album by Maurice Starr
- Released: 1980
- Recorded: 1979
- Studio: Intermedia Studios, Boston, Massachusetts; Boston International Recorders, Boston; Northern Studios, Maynard, Massachusetts
- Label: RCA
- Producer: Maurice Starr; Michael Jonzun

Maurice Starr chronology
Flaming Starr (1980)	Spacey Lady (1983)

Professional ratings
Review scores
Source	Rating
AllMusic	4/5 stars

Flaming Starr is the debut album by Maurice Starr. It was released in 1980.

== Critical reception ==
AllMusic wrote that "when Starr really turns up the funk and emphasizes keyboards and synthesizers, Flaming Starr predicts the synth-funk/electro-hop era; that is especially true on "Moving on Up" and the infectious "Dance to the Funky Groove"." The Boston Globe declared that "Side 1 ... contains almost no excess - its songs make their point, grab a place in the listener's memory, and end."

== Track listing ==
All tracks composed, arranged and produced by Maurice Starr and Michael Jonzun

No.	Title	Length
1.	"Moving On Up"	5:37
2.	"I Wanna Dance with You"	3:13
3.	"Come See Me Sometime"	5:30
4.	"Start All Over"	6:41
5.	"Dance to the Funky Groove"	6:08
6.	"When I Say I Love You"	4:21
7.	"You're the One (What's Your Name?)"	4:33
8.	"It's My Life"	3:34
