= Rockin' Radio =

Studio album by Tom Browne
- Released: 1983
- Recorded: 1982
- Studio: Unique Recording Studios, Intergalactic Studios and Secret Sound (New York City, New York)
- Genre: Jazz; R&B; Funk
- Length: 44:33
- Label: Arista
- Producer: Maurice Starr; Michael Jonzun; Dave Grusin; Larry Rosen; David Spradley; Ted Currier

Tom Browne chronology
| Yours Truly (1981) | Rockin' Radio (1983) | Tommy Gun (1984) |

Professional ratings
Review scores
| Source | Rating |
|---|---|
| Allmusic | 2.5/5 stars |

Rockin' Radio is a 1983 album by Jazz trumpeter Tom Browne, released on Arista Records. It is his fifth album. His prior album, Yours Truly had success on the charts, but no charting single. Rockin Radio was different. The album peaked at #24 on the R&B album charts and #147 on the Billboard 200 (both lower than Yours Truly), but the title track hit #11 on the R&B charts and #33 on the dance charts. "Crusin'" hit #63 on the R&B charts.

Michael Jonzun and Maurice Starr of The Jonzun Crew both helped write the title track.

== Track listing ==
All tracks composed and arranged by Tom Browne, except where indicated.

1. "Rockin' Radio" (Michael Jonzun, Maurice Starr) – 6:14
2. "Cruisin'" (David Spradley) – 6:29
3. "Turn It Up (Come on Y'all)" (David Spradley, Tom Currier) – 6:30 (featuring Evan Rogers)
4. "Angeline" – 4:40
5. "Brighter Tomorrow" (Cliff Branch) – 6:18
6. "Never My Love" (Richard Addrisi, Donald Addrisi) – 4:18
7. "Mr. Business" – 5:46
8. "Feel Like Making Love" (Mick Ralphs, Paul Rodgers) – 4:17

== Personnel ==
- Tom Browne – arrangements, horns (1), horn arrangements (1), trumpet (2–8), flugelhorn (4–8), Korg synthesizer (4–8), Oberheim OB-X (4–8), Prophet-5 (4–8), LinnDrum (4–8), percussion (4–8), backing vocals (4–8)
- Maurice Starr – keyboards (1), synthesizers (1), electric funk bass (1), electronic drums (1), drum programming (1), percussion (1)
- David Spradley – keyboards (2, 3), synthesizers (2, 3), E-mu Emulator (2, 3), drum programming (2, 3)
- Cliff Branch – acoustic piano (4–8), Fender Rhodes (4–8), Oberheim OB-X (4–8), percussion (4–8), backing vocals (4–8), arrangements (5)
- Bernard Wright – acoustic piano (4–8), Fender Rhodes (4–8), Korg synthesizer (4–8), Oberheim OB-X (4–8), Prophet-5 (4–8), percussion (4–8), backing vocals (4–8)
- Bobby Broom – guitars (7, 8)
- Victor Bailey – electric bass (6)
- Ted Currier – drum programming (2, 3)
- Jimmy Johnson – congas (1)
- Alvin "Wink" Flythe Jr. – horns (1)
- Evan Rogers – lead vocals (3)
- Carol Woods – lead vocals (5)
- Amy London – backing vocals (5)
- Majorie Barnes – lead and backing vocals (7)

=== Production ===
- Cherrie Shepherd – executive producer (2, 3)
- Maurice Starr – producer (1)
- Michael Jonzun – co-producer (1)
- Ted Currier – producer (2, 3)
- David Spradley – producer (2, 3)
- Dave Grusin – producer (4–8)
- Larry Rosen – producer (4–8)
- Chris Lord-Alge – engineer (2), mixing (2)
- Jay Burnett – engineer (2, 3), mixing (2, 3)
- Josiah Gluck – recording (4–8)
- Scott Noll – recording (4–8), mixing (4–8)
- Nina Siff – recording (4–8), mixing (4–8)
- Tom Browne – mixing (4–8)
- Damon Bates – recording assistant (4–8)
- Debbie Rebhun – recording assistant (4–8)
- Howie Weinberg – mastering at Masterdisk (New York, NY)
- Donn Davenport – art direction
- Vincent Hughes Frye – photography
- Lisa Daurio – stylist
- Florentini – male clothes
- Bill Ditfort Designs – male sweater
- Samantha Robbins – female clothes
- Jamaican Flower Associates Inc. – management
- Beverly Ainsworth – management
