= Iesha =

Single by Another Bad Creation

from the album Coolin' at the Playground Ya Know!
- Released: October 2, 1990
- Recorded: Early 1990
- Genre: R&B, hip hop, new jack swing
- Length: 3:57
- Label: Motown
- Songwriters: Dallas Austin; Michael Bivins
- Producer: Dallas Austin

Another Bad Creation singles chronology
"Iesha" (1990)	"Playground" (1991)

Music video
- "Iesha" on YouTube

"Iesha" is the debut single by American hip-hop and new jack swing group Another Bad Creation, from their debut album, Coolin' at the Playground Ya Know! (1991). Released on October 2, 1990, the song reached #9 on the US Billboard Hot 100 chart and #6 on the R&B chart.

== Track listings ==
US Vinyl, 12"

- 1 Iesha [LP Version] 4:20
- 2 Iesha [Stupid Club 12" Mix] 7:13
- 3 Iesha [Mental Mix] 4:21

UK Vinyl, 12"

- 1 Iesha [Stupid Club 12" Mix] 7:13
- 2 Iesha [7" Version] 3:10
- 3 Iesha [House Mix] 4:19
- 4 Iesha [After Hours Mix] 4:19
- 5 Iesha [After Hours Instrumental] 4:26

== Charts ==
=== Weekly charts ===
Chart (1990–1991)	Peak position
Australia (ARIA)	17
US Billboard Hot 100	9
US R&B Singles (Billboard)	6
US Cash Box Top 100	25

=== Year-end charts ===
Chart (1991)	Position
US Billboard Hot 100	54

== Certifications ==
Region	Certification	Certified units/sales
United States (RIAA)	Gold	500,000^{^}
^{^} Shipments figures based on certification alone.
