= Here in My Heart (Tiffany song) =

Single by Tiffany

from the album New Inside
- Released: 1990 (Japan); January 8, 1991 (U.S.)
- Genre: Pop
- Length: 4:09
- Label: MCA (U.S.); WEA (Japan)
- Songwriter: Diane Warren
- Producer: Phillip Damien

Tiffany singles chronology
"New Inside" (1990)	"Here in My Heart" (1990)	"Back in the Groove" (1991)

"Here in My Heart" is a song by American singer Tiffany, which was released as the second single from her third studio album New Inside (1990). The song was written by Diane Warren and produced by Phillip Damien. Originally dedicated to AIDS victim Ryan White, it was re-dedicated to troops serving in the Gulf War. The track began receiving airplay in late November 1990 before being released on January 8, 1991, via a one-track cassette single in the United States. "Here in My Heart" failed to garner any success.

== Background ==
"Here in My Heart" was originally dedicated to AIDS victim Ryan White; however, as an attempt to take advantage of current events, it was rededicated to the troops serving in the Gulf War and became the official USO song.

The song was released in America and Japan only as a promotional single and was therefore ineligible to chart. Although the New Inside album was a commercial failure, the song gained popularity on the compilation album Greatest Hits (1996) in the United States as well as various compilation albums released in Japan.

== Release ==
In America, the song was released as a one-track promotional CD single and commercial cassette single via MCA Records, aiming for radio station play only in 1991. For the 1990 Japanese promotional single, "Here in My Heart" was released via WEA Music K.K. as a 3inch CD with a snap-pack picture sleeve design and a promotional sticker on reverse. It featured the B-side track "Our Love" which was taken from the New Inside album. The sleeve design featured a photograph of Tiffany while having a pink background color.

Following the original release on the New Inside album and as a single, the song has also appeared on five Tiffany compilation albums, including the 1992 MCA Victor Japanese release Best 16, the 1996 Universal/MCA Japanese release Best One, All the Best, released via MCA in Japan and Singapore only in 1996, as well as the 1996 Hip-O release Greatest Hits which was released in America.

== Promotion ==
A music video was created for the song - the only track from the New Inside album to have an official music video. The music video was directed by Doug Nichol and was filmed at the Royal Nouveau Hotel in Paris, France, the same hotel where Madonna's "Justify My Love" was filmed.

The song was performed live around the album's release and a professionally filmed recording of the song was live at Poland's Sopot Festival in 1990. An unofficial audience recording of the song has appeared on YouTube of Tiffany performing the song live on October 27, 2009, at Upright Cabaret. Other audience recorded videos exist on YouTube, along with a live performance of the song at the Lancaster Opera House on November 20, 2011, which featured Ivan Docenko on piano.

== Reception ==
=== Critical reception ===
Chicago Tribune writer Jan DeKnock stated "Throughout, Tiffany shows off a new throaty snarl to go along with her powerful pipes, which, unfortunately, sometimes must fight against too many layers of busy production. The simple charm of the album's only true ballad, Diane Warren's "Here in My Heart", shows that Tiffany's true calling may prove to be country/rock, where her strong, expressive voice (sometimes reminiscent of Brenda Lee) could be shown off to greater advantage." The Fresno Bee reviewed the album on November 2, stating "There's nothing here that would embarrass somebody like Cher. Tiffany even cops some of Cher's chops for "Here in My Heart" - no surprise, given that it was written by Diane Warren." Billboard said of the track: "Evocative power ballad from former teen queen is dedicated to U.S. troops in Saudi Arabia. Could score with top 40 programmers who passed on the previous "New Inside.""

=== Commercial reception ===
Although it was labeled under "New & Active" on the Radio & Records Adult Contemporary chart, the track did not enter any chart from Billboard, Radio & Records, the Gavin Report, or Cashbox.

== Track listing ==
US single-sided cassette single
No.	Title	Writer(s)	Producer(s)	Length
1.	"Here in My Heart"	Diane Warren	Phillip Damien	4:09

Japanese mini-CD single
No.	Title	Writer(s)	Producer(s)	Length
1.	"Here in My Heart"	Diane Warren	Phillip Damien	4:09
2.	"Our Love"	Damien	Damien	6:09

== Cover versions ==
- In 1994, Spanish singer Paloma San Basilio released a Spanish version with the title of "Luna del Mar" in her album Al Este Del Edén.
- Also in 1994, Dutch singer René Froger released his own version of the song for his eighth studio album Walls of Emotion. It was released as a CD single via Dino Music that year as well in Europe. The single peaked at No. 12 on the Dutch Singles Chart and stayed on the chart for a total of eight weeks.
- In 1997, a Diane Warren promotional six-disc set titled A Passion for Music featured four CDs of the hits of Diane Warren from 1983 to 1997 and two CDs of hidden classics in their original demo form. Amongst the demo versions was the original demo of "Here in My Heart", performed by Susie Benson.
- In 2000, German hard rock band Scorpions and the Berlin Philharmonic Orchestra released a version of the song on the album Moment of Glory. That version peaked at No. 91 on the UK Singles Chart.
