= New Inside (song) =

Single by Tiffany

from the album New Inside
- Released: August 28, 1990
- Genre: R&B; new jack swing; funk pop
- Length: 5:35 (album version); 4:53 (7"/radio edit); 4:13 (German/Australian 7" edit)
- Label: MCA
- Songwriters: Phillip Damien; Dennis Cheese
- Producer: Phillip Damien

Tiffany singles chronology
"I Always Thought I'd See You Again" (1990)	"New Inside" (1990)	"Here in My Heart" (1990)

"New Inside" is a song by American singer Tiffany, which was released by MCA on August 28, 1990, as the lead single from her third studio album New Inside. The song was written by Phillip Damien and Dennis Cheese, and produced by Damien.

== Background ==
Both "New Inside" and the album of the same name marked a change of musical direction for Tiffany as she moved towards an urban and contemporary R&B sound. In a 2012 interview with The A.V. Club, Tiffany said of the song's message, "Of course, we made it about a love relationship, but the song is really more about busting down walls, changing things, being open-minded, pushing yourself a little bit and being a little 'new inside'."

== Critical reception ==
On its release, Billboard considered "New Inside" to be "astonishingly potent funk-pop" and described Tiffany's vocals as "assured and assertive". Music & Media felt the song was "in the tradition" of Janet Jackson and Paula Abdul and noted the "hard-core dance beat". They added that Tiffany "sound[s] a lot rougher than usual".

== Track listing ==
7-inch single (German/Australian release)

1. "New Inside" – 4:13
2. "New Inside (Radio Edit)" – 4:53

12-inch and CD single (North American release)

1. "New Inside (12" Extended Mix)" – 6:27
2. "New Inside (7" Edit)" – 4:53
3. "New Inside (Instrumental)" – 5:54
4. "New Inside (Bonus Beats)" – 2:06

12-inch single (German release)

1. "New Inside (12" Extended Mix)" – 6:27
2. "New Inside (Instrumental)" – 5:44
3. "New Inside (Bonus Beats)" – 2:06

CD single (German release)

1. "New Inside (Extended Version)" – 6:27
2. "New Inside (7" Version)" – 4:13
3. "New Inside (Radio Edit)" – 4:53

CD single (Japanese release)

1. "New Inside" – 4:53
2. "New Inside (Extended Vox)" – 6:27

== Charts ==
Chart (1990)	Peak position
Australia (ARIA Charts)	159
