= Ana (Ana album) =

Studio album by Ana
- Released: January 21, 1987
- Genres: Pop; freestyle
- Length: 37:27
- Label: Parc Records
- Producers: Frank Wildhorn; Karl Richardson

Ana chronology
Ana (1987)	Body Language (1990)

Singles from Ana
- 1. "Shy Boys" Released: 1987; 2. "The Boy Next Door" Released: 1988

Japan release cover

Ana is the debut studio album by Cuban-American singer Ana, released by Parc Records in 1987. It features her debut single, "Shy Boys", which peaked at No. 94 on the Billboard Hot 100 and No. 23 on the Billboard Dance Chart. The album was released in Japan by CBS Sony as Shy Boys.

The album was made available on streaming platforms on January 28, 2022, with eight bonus tracks, including the 1988 stand-alone single "Before I Jump".

== Track listing ==
All tracks are written by Frank Wildhorn and Sue Shifrin, except where indicated.

Side A
No.	Title	Writer(s)	Length
1.	"Shy Boys"		3:12
2.	"Loveline"	Wildhorn; S. Richardson; B. Marlette	3:48
3.	"If You Were Mine"		4:10
4.	"One More Night"	Wildhorn; B. Potter	3:44
5.	"Love Is the Winner"		3:47

Side B
No.	Title	Writer(s)	Length
1.	"The Boy Next Door"	Wildhorn; Potter	3:23
2.	"Innocent Girl"	D. Bugatti; S. von Wollenmann	4:05
3.	"I Can See It in Your Eyes"		3:58
4.	"I'd Like to Get to Know You"		3:32
5.	"Learn to Love Again"		3:48

2022 bonus tracks
No.	Title	Writer(s)	Length
11.	"Shy Boys" (12" Mix)		5:31
12.	"Shy Boys" (Dub Mix)		3:59
13.	"Shy Boys" (Special 12" Remix)		6:17
14.	"The Boy Next Door" (Special 12" Remix)	Wildhorn; Potter	5:22
15.	"Before I Jump" (12" Club Mix)	Ana Rodríguez; Wildhorn; Shifrin	6:30
16.	"Before I Jump" (7" Single Mix)	Rodríguez; Wildhorn; Shifrin	3:30
17.	"Before I Jump" (Power Radio Mix)	Rodríguez; Wildhorn; Shifrin	4:53
18.	"Before I Jump" (12" Club Dub)	Rodríguez; Wildhorn; Shifrin	6:03

== Personnel ==
- Frank Wildhorn – keyboards
- Tim Pierce – guitar
- Michael "Benny" Benedict – saxophone
- Marissa Benedict – trumpet
- Denny Fongheiser – drums
- Lynn Davis – backing vocals
- Alex Brown – backing vocals
- Josie James – backing vocals
- Marcy Levy – backing vocals
