= Another Bad Creation =

American hip hop group

- Also known as: ABC
- Origin: Atlanta, Georgia, U.S.
- Genres: Hip-hop, new jack swing
- Years active: 1988–1995, 2003, 2006-2007, 2019-present
- Labels: Biv 10 Records; Another Bad Creation LLC
- Past members: Romell Chapman; Demetrius Pugh; Marliss Pugh; Christopher Sellers; David Shelton; Adrian Witcher

Another Bad Creation (sometimes called ABC for short) was an American hip-hop and new jack swing group from Atlanta who were active in the early 1990s.

They were one of the first major pre-teen boy bands in the early 1990s and were discovered by Michael Bivins of Bell Biv DeVoe. The group consisted of Chris Sellers, Marliss (Mark), Demetrius Pugh (Red), David Shelton, Romell Chapman, Adrian Witcher (G.A.).

ABC rose to fame with their debut album, Coolin' at the Playground Ya Know! (1991), which featured hit singles "Iesha" and "Playground". Their music blended New Jack Swing with youthful, playful lyrics, often depicting childhood crushes and schoolyard life.

The group was signed to Biv 10 Records, a label founded by Michael Bivins under Motown Records. They were also part of The East Coast Family, a collective of Bivins' artists that included Boyz II Men, Bell Biv DeVoe, MC Brains, and later 702. In 1992, they participated in the collaborative single "1-4-All-4-1", which showcased the talent on Biv 10 Records.

ABC's success directly influenced later young rap and R&B acts, including Kris Kross and IMx. They also paved the way for younger hip-hop duos such as Illegal and Kronic, who adopted a tougher rap style while maintaining the youthful energy that ABC introduced. ABC continue to regroup on occasion, such as March 2026 Atlanta date of New Edition's Way Tour.

== History ==
ABC consisted of David "Li'l Dave" Shelton (b. November 11, 1982 from Boston, Massachusetts), cousins Romell "RoRo" Chapman (b. June 15, 1978 from Atlanta, Georgia) and Christopher "Chris" Sellers (b. October 19, 1978 from Cleveland, Ohio), and brothers from Atlanta, Georgia Demetrius "Red" (b. September 23, 1979) and Marliss "Mark" (b. April 15, 1982) Pugh, as well as Adrian "G.A." (General Austin) Witcher (b. September 7, 1978). They were discovered by Michael Bivins. ABC's debut album Coolin' at the Playground Ya Know! was released on February 11, 1991. The album's two biggest singles were the first and second singles: "Iesha" and "Playground" respectively, which reached the top ten on both the R&B and pop charts (the latter was also the group's only showing on the Dance chart). A cover of New Edition's song "Jealous Girl" followed, as well as the singles "Spydermann" and "My World". The album reached #7 on the Billboard 200 and eventually went platinum.

During this time, Mark and Dave appeared among other children (including Macaulay Culkin) in a scene of Michael Jackson's video "Black or White". Also during the same time, all the members of ABC made their only movie appearance to date, as characters in The Meteor Man (which also featured appearances from various other musicians). They dyed their hair blonde for the movie, a style they also showcased in the video for the East Coast Family's only collective song, "1-4-All-4-1".

On March 3, 1991, Another Bad Creation appeared on the sketch comedy show In Living Color singing "Iesha". Keenen Ivory Wayans introduced them by comparing them to The Jackson 5, New Edition, and The Boys.

ABC's second album It Ain't What U Wear, It's How U Play It was released on September 21, 1993. The album and the singles did not chart on a Billboard chart.

== Discography ==
=== Albums ===
Year	Title	Chart positions			Certifications (sales thresholds)
Year	Title	US	U.S. R&B	AUS	Certifications (sales thresholds)
1991	Coolin' at the Playground Ya Know!: Released: February 11, 1991; Label: Motown	7	2	80	US: 2× Platinum
1993	It Ain't What U Wear, It's How U Play It: Released: September 21, 1993; Label: Motown	–	–	–	

=== Singles ===
Year	Song	U.S. Hot 100	U.S. R&B	U.S. D/C	AUS	Album
1990	"Iesha"	9	6	9	17	Coolin' at the Playground Ya Know!
1991	"Playground"	10	4	6	138	Coolin' at the Playground Ya Know!
1991	"Jealous Girl"	-	25	-	-	Coolin' at the Playground Ya Know!
1992	"Spydermann"	-	-	-	-	Coolin' at the Playground Ya Know!
1992	"My World"	-	77	-	195	Coolin' at the Playground Ya Know!
1993	"I Don't Wanna Be Grown Up"	-	-	-	-	It Ain't What U Wear, It's How U Play It
1993	"Where's Ya Little Sista?"	-	-	-	-	It Ain't What U Wear, It's How U Play It
