= Playground (song) =

Single by Another Bad Creation

from the album Coolin' at the Playground Ya Know!
- Released: March 25, 1991
- Recorded: Early 1990
- Genre: New jack swing
- Label: Motown
- Songwriters: Dallas Austin, Michael Bivins, Kevin Wales
- Producer: Dallas Austin

Another Bad Creation singles chronology
"Iesha" (1990)	"Playground" (1991)	"Jealous Girl" (1991)

"Playground" is a single by Another Bad Creation, from the album Coolin' at the Playground Ya Know! Released on March 25, 1991, the song reached #10 on the Billboard Hot 100 chart, #4 on the R&B chart, and #36 on the Dance chart.

== Track listings ==
US Single

- 1 Playground [7" Mix]
- 2 Playground [Acappella Mix]

US Vinyl, 12"

- A Playground [12" Mix] 5:18
- B1 Playground [7" Mix] 4:16
- B2 Playground [Acappella Mix] 3:53

UK Vinyl, 7"

- A Playground [Radio Remix] 3:50
- B Playground [Original 7" Mix] 4:16

UK Vinyl, 12"

- A1 Playground [12" Mix] 5:18
- A2 Playground [7" Mix] 4:16
- B1 Playground [Dub Mix] 5:38
- B2 Playground [Mo' Beats] 4:11
