= Rick Wes =

American singer

- Born: Craig Gendreau; Fall River, Massachusetts
- Genres: Pop
- Occupation: Singer
- Instrument: Vocals
- Years active: 1990–1991
- Labels: Epic (1990); Boston/Hollywood (1991)

Craig Gendreau, better known by his stage name Rick Wes, is an American singer who was active from 1990 to 1991.

== Career ==
Craig Gendreau was discovered at a talent show in Nashua, New Hampshire by songwriter and producer Maurice Starr, who was looking for "a white soul kid." Despite Gendreau having no singing background or stage experience, Starr envisioned him as "like James Dean -- only better, with a touch of Elvis." While figuring out how to market Gendreau, Starr gave him the first name "Rick" after Rick Springfield, and the last name "Wes" after getting lost somewhere between Providence, Rhode Island and Westford, Massachusetts and seeing a "North South East West" road sign.

Wes released his debut album North, South, East, Wes through Epic Records in 1990. Greg Sandow of Entertainment Weekly gave the album an F, calling it: "nine of the lamest songs ever recorded, dance music blended with a watery memory of Elvis and so vapidly produced that you have to wonder whether Starr now thinks he can create hits without doing any real work."

In 1991, Wes released his second album Possession through Boston Records/Hollywood Records. Like its predecessor, the album was also a commercial failure.

== Discography ==
=== Albums ===
- North, South, East, Wes (1990)
- Possession (1991)

=== Singles ===
- "North, South, East, West" (1990)
- "Don'tchu Wanna Rock" (1990)
- "Possession" (1991)
- "It's You" (1991)
