= Temptation (disambiguation) =

A temptation is an act that looks appealing to an individual.

Temptation may also refer to:

== Film ==
- Temptation (1915 film), directed by Cecil B. DeMille
- Temptation (1923 film), an American silent film
- Temptation (1929 film), a French silent film
- Temptation (1930 film), an American romance film
- Temptation (1934 film), a British-French musical comedy film
- Temptation (1935 film), an American drama film
- Temptation (1936 film), a French drama film
- Temptation (1942 film), a Hungarian drama film
- Temptation (1946 film), an American drama film noir
- Temptation (1959 film), a French drama film
- Temptation (1968 film), an Italian film of 1968
- Temptation (2004 film), a 2004 film musical
- Temptation: Confessions of a Marriage Counselor, a 2013 film

== Television ==
- Temptation (1967 American game show)
- Temptation (Australian game show), revival of the Reg Grundy Sale of the Century franchise
  - Temptation (2007 U.S. game show), based on the Grundy version of Sale of the Century
- The Temptations (miniseries), a 1998 NBC television miniseries about the Motown singing group
- Temptation (2003 film), Australian TV movie
- Temptation (2014 TV series), a South Korean television series
- "Temptation", TV series episode of Code Lyoko, see list of Code Lyoko episodes
- Temptation, a pricing game on The Price Is Right

== Literature ==
- Temptation of Christ, a passage from the New Testament
- Temptation (novella), a story by David Brin
- Temptation (play), a Faustian play written by Czech playwright Václav Havel in 1985

== Music ==
- The Temptations, a U.S. Motown group
- The Temptations (New York vocal group), an earlier US group best known for their 1960 hit "Barbara"

=== Albums ===
- Temptation (Holly Cole album), 1995
- Temptation (Harisu album), 2001
- Temptation (Monrose album), 2006
- Temptation (Shelby Lynne album), 1993
- Temptation (Brenda K. Starr album), 2002
- Temptation – The Best of Heaven 17, 1999

=== Songs ===
- "Temptation" (Nacio Herb Brown and Arthur Freed song), 1933, covered by Perry Como. the Everly Brothers and others
- "Temptation" (Heaven 17 song), 1983
- "Temptation" (New Order song), 1982
- "Temptation", a song by Elvis Costello & The Attractions from the 1980 album Get Happy!!
- "Temptation" (Joan Armatrading song), 1985
- "Temptation", a song by Prince from the 1985 album Around the World in a Day
- "Temptation", a song by Tom Waits from the 1987 album Franks Wild Years
- "Temptation" (Wet Wet Wet song), 1988
- "Temptation" (Corina song), 1991
- "Temptations" (song), a 1995 song by 2Pac
- "Temptation" (The Tea Party song), 1997
- "Temptation" (Arash song), 2005
- "Temptation" (Emigrate song), 2007
- "Temptation" (Joey Badass song), 2017
- "Temptation", a song by P-Square from the 2005 album Get Squared
- "Temptation", a song by Godsmack from IV
- "Temptation", a song by Destiny's Child from the 1999 album The Writing's on the Wall
- "Temptation", a song by Ellie Goulding from the deluxe edition of her 2023 album Higher Than Heaven

== Sports ==
- Los Angeles Temptation, a team in the Lingerie Football League
