= Tentación (album) =

Studio album by Mía
- Released: September 30, 2003
- Recorded: May – July 2003
- Studio: Farm House Recording Studio; Gemelli Recording Studios; L&M Recording Studio; The Hit Factory (Critiera) (Miami, Florida); North Bay Recording Studios (Miami Beach, Florida)
- Genre: Latin pop; dance-pop; latin ballad
- Length: 36:35
- Language: Spanish
- Label: Univision
- Producer: Rudy Pérez · José Behar (Executive producer)

Mía chronology
Body Language (1990)	Tentación (2003)

Singles from Tentación
- 1. "Te Tengo Que Aprender a Olvidar" Released: August 4, 2003; 2. "Convéncete" Released: November 24, 2003

Tentación (Spanish: Temptation) is the third studio album recorded by Cuban-American recording artist Ana (under the pseudonym Mía), This album was released by Univision Records on September 30, 2003 (see 2003 in music). Produced by renowned Latin musician and producer Rudy Pérez, it features the singles "Te Tengo Que Aprender a Olvidar" and "Convéncete". The album garnered Mía a Best New Artist of the Year nomination at the Premio Lo Nuestro 2004.

== Track listing ==
No.	Title	Writer(s)	Length
1.	"Tentación"	Billy Mann; Rudy Pérez	3:11
2.	"Acariciame"	Juan Carlos Calderón	3:53
3.	"Ahora te Dejo yo"	Pérez	3:55
4.	"Convéncete"	Mario Patiño	3:21
5.	"Tonto Orgullo"	Patiño; Pérez	3:57
6.	"Te Tengo Que Aprender a Olvidar"	Juan Marcelo; Paula de Jesús	3:38
7.	"No Tienes Mi Perdón"	Jorge Luis Piloto; Pérez	3:40
8.	"Villa Miseria"	Piloto	3:43
9.	"Presentimiento"	Patiño; Pérez	3:48
10.	"Es el Amor"	Roberto Livi; Pérez	3:16
Total length:			36:35

== Credits and personnel ==
=== Personnel ===
- Rudy Pérez – guitar, backing vocals
- Dan Warner – guitar
- Manny López – guitar
- Piero Gemelli – guitar
- Beppe Gemelli – keyboards, drums
- Clay Perry – keyboards
- Joel Numa – keyboards
- Manny López – keyboards
- Julio Hernández – bass
- Lee Levin – drums
- Orlando Hernández – drums
- Edwin Bonilla – percussion
- Richard Bravo – percussion
- Ed Calle – saxophone
- Teddy Mulet – trumpet, trombone
- Jim Hacker – trumpet
- John Kricker – trombone
- Catalina Rodríguez – backing vocals
- Jeannie Cruz – backing vocals
- Ramiro Teran – backing vocals
- Vicky Echeverri – backing vocals
- Wendy Pedersen – backing vocals
- Miami Symphonic Strings – orchestra
