= Classic Example =

American contemporary R&B group

- Genres: R&B
- Years active: 1990s
- Labels: Hollywood
- Past members: Darin Campbell; Gerald Alston; Jami Thomson; Marvin Harris; Robert Rose

Classic Example was an American contemporary R&B group that was active in the early 1990s. The group consisted of Darin Campbell, Gerald Alston, Jami Thomson, Marvin Harris and Robert Rose.

The group's only charting single was their debut single "It's Alright", which peaked at #68 on the Billboard Hot 100 in 1992. The single appeared on the soundtrack to the film South Central as well as on the group's eponymous debut album, but neither album charted in the United States.

== Discography ==
=== Albums ===
- Classic Example (1992)

=== Singles ===
Year	Song	Peak chart positions			Album
Year	Song	U.S. Hot 100	U.S. R&B	U.S. Rhythmic	Album
1992	"It's Alright"	68	53	30	Classic Example / South Central (soundtrack)
1992	"Christmas Song"	—	—	—	Non-album single
1993	"I Do Care"	—	—	—	Classic Example
