= Maurice Starr =

American musician, songwriter, and record producer

- Born: Larry Curtis Johnson; November 19, 1953 (age 72); Deland, Florida, United States
- Genres: R&B; electro; funk; pop
- Occupations: Record producer; musician; songwriter
- Instruments: Piano; guitar
- Years active: 1970s–present

Larry Curtis Johnson (born November 19, 1953), better known by his stage name Maurice Starr, is an American musician, songwriter, and record producer. He is best known for his production work for boy bands New Edition and New Kids on the Block. He was fired by New Edition for embezzling funds.

== Biography ==
=== Early life ===
Originally from DeLand, Florida, Johnson moved to Boston, Massachusetts, in the early 1970s.

=== Career ===
Johnson was a member of the Johnson Brothers (not to be confused with the Brothers Johnson from Los Angeles, California) and the seminal electro group known as the Jonzun Crew with brothers Michael Jonzun and Soni Jonzun. In 1980, Johnson changed his name to Maurice Starr and recorded two R&B albums, Flaming Starr and Spacey Lady. Unsuccessful as a solo artist, and described as "a cross between Berry Gordy and P. T. Barnum," Starr decided to create a band to perform the songs that he wrote.

In 1982, Starr discovered the band New Edition on his talent show. He co-wrote and co-produced its debut album with the hits "Candy Girl", "Is This the End", and "Popcorn Love". Despite the album's success, and a lengthy tour, New Edition members received royalty payments of only $1.87 each, and they fired Starr in late 1983, accusing him of embezzlement. Retaining industry attorney Steven Machat, the band sued Starr for damages and won, also winning the right to continue using their group name. Signed to a new label, New Edition produced more hit singles throughout the 1980s.

In 1986, Starr created New Kids on the Block, a band consisting of five male teenagers: brothers Jonathan and Jordan Knight, Joey McIntyre, Donnie Wahlberg, and Danny Wood. Starr intended NKOTB to be a white version of New Edition; he stated "I honestly believe that if they'd been white, [New Edition] would have been 20 times as big." By 1989, NKOTB was the fastest-rising act in the United States. Starr handled the group's lucrative marketing of posters, T-shirts, and other spin-offs. By the fall of 1989, the New Kids on the Block were so huge that their holiday album Merry, Merry Christmas catapulted into the Top Ten upon its release, reaching double-platinum status not long afterward. The album spawned the top-ten single "This One's for the Children", which was produced and recorded at Tony Rose's Hit City Recording Studio in Roxbury, Massachusetts.

Starr later attempted to repeat his success with artists such as Perfect Gentlemen, Rick Wes, Homework, the Superiors, Heart Body & Soul, Classic Example, Tommy Page, and Ana. None of these acts attained anything like the massive popularity of New Edition and New Kids on the Block. Starr also attempted to revitalize Tiffany's faltering career with her third album New Inside, but it failed to chart in the U.S.

Starr affected a persona he called the General, wearing various quasi-military uniforms in black, white or red, emblazoned with medals and gold piping. In an interview, he admitted he did not earn the medals by way of military service.

=== 2000s ===
Starr manages NK5, another boy band he assembled. Like his earlier successful boy bands, he produces and writes the group's songs.

== Discography ==
=== Albums ===
- Flaming Starr (1980)
- Spacey Lady (1983)

=== Production ===
- Candy Girl - New Edition (1983)
- Rockin' Radio - Tom Browne (1983) - wrote the title track
- Electric Lady - Con Funk Shun (1985)
- New Kids on the Block - New Kids on the Block (1986)
- Hangin' Tough - New Kids on the Block (1988)
- Step by Step - New Kids on the Block (1990)
- Rated PG - Perfect Gentlemen (1990)
- Homework - Homework (1990)
- New Inside - Tiffany (1990)
- Body Language - Ana (1990)
- North, South, East, Wes - Rick Wes (1990)
