= Is This the End =

Single by New Edition

from the album Candy Girl
- Released: May 15, 1983
- Recorded: 1982
- Studio: Unique Recording Studios
- Length: 4:11
- Label: Streetwise/Warlock
- Songwriter(s): Michael Jonzun, Maurice Starr
- Producer(s): Maurice Starr

New Edition singles chronology
"Candy Girl" (1983)	"Is This the End" (1983)	"Popcorn Love" (1983)

Music video
- "Is This the End" (Audio) on YouTube

"Is This the End" is a 1983 song by R&B/pop group New Edition, written and produced by Maurice Starr, and is the second single from their debut album, Candy Girl.

An R&B hit, the single peaked at number eight on the R&B singles chart and at number eighty-five pop. Ralph Tresvant sings primary lead, with Ricky Bell handling the outro.

== Charts ==
Chart (1983)	Peak position
U.S. Billboard Hot 100	85
U.S. Billboard Hot Black Singles	8
