= Candy Girl (album) =

Studio album by New Edition
- Released: July 19, 1983
- Recorded: 1982
- Studio: Unique Recording Studios
- Genre: R&B, pop
- Length: 43:40
- Label: Streetwise
- Producer: Maurice Starr (also exec.), Arthur Baker, Paul McCraven (exec.), Michael Jonzun

New Edition chronology
Candy Girl (1983)	New Edition (1984)

Singles from New Edition
- 1. "Candy Girl" Released: February 24, 1983; 2. "Is This the End" Released: May 15, 1983; 3. "Popcorn Love" Released: August 6, 1983; 4. "She Gives Me a Bang" Released: January 1984

Professional ratings
Review scores
Source	Rating
Allmusic	4/5 stars
Robert Christgau	B
Rolling Stone	4/5 stars

Candy Girl is the debut album of New Edition, released by Streetwise Records on July 19, 1983. The album was produced by Maurice Starr and Arthur Baker.

== Production and conception ==
New Edition was created by Bobby Brown after a failed talent show due to his stage fright. Bobby put the group together by adding Ricky Bell and Michael Bivins in 1978. With need for an additional singer, Ralph Tresvant was added in 1981. The name New Edition was given to them by Brooke Payne, choreographer and uncle of Ronnie DeVoe who decided the group would be better choreographed with five members so he added Ronnie, but only after proving he was able to make the cut. Maurice Starr wrote and produced the title song seeing New Edition perform at a talent show. He signed them and had them record Candy Girl in a small studio in Roxbury, Massachusetts, in 1982. By the time the title song "Candy Girl" was released, the group had hit their stride, so much so that Kurtis Blow, a rather popular rapper at that time, served as their opening act. The band members were between the ages of 14 and 16 when the song was released.

== Release and promotion ==
The lead single of the album, "Candy Girl", while being a massive hit on black radio stateside and overseas, struggled for consistent plays on pop radio and the video failed to crack the rotation at MTV in the U.S. despite strong sales numbers and being number one on Billboard's Hot Black Singles (R&B) chart, surpassing George Clinton's "Atomic Dog" and Michael Jackson's "Billie Jean" while staving off "Beat It" on May 14, 1983, spending 18 straight weeks on the Hot Black Singles chart. It ended up peaking at only number 46 on Billboard's Hot 100 pop singles chart.

The album Candy Girl was released on July 19, 1983, and was one of Billboard's Top Album in the July 23, 1983 issue. "Candy Girl" first entered Billboard's Black LPs chart at number 44 the week of August 13, 1983.

The title track was followed up with the singles "Is This the End" (number eight R&B and number 85 on the Hot 100) and "Popcorn Love" (number 100 R&B).

In the UK, the album was released on September 23, 1983, and the title song went to number one on the UK singles chart. The follow-up singles "Popcorn Love" and "Is This the End" also charted at number 43 and number 83 respectively.

Although New Edition's Candy Girl album spent 43 straight weeks on the Black LPs chart and 33 straight weeks on Billboard's Top LPs & Tapes chart beginning on September 23, 1983, with a peak position of number 90, neither the hit single "Candy Girl" nor the LP Candy Girl received RIAA Gold or Platinum certification due to questionable accounting practices. Disputes over sales and revenue generated by the "Candy Girl" single and album led to New Edition's families seeking representation to sue their label Streetwise Records and wrest control of the group from Bostonian songwriter/producers Maurice Starr, Michael Jonzun and Arthur Baker.

== Track listing ==
All songs written by Maurice Starr and Michael Jonzun, except where noted.

No.	Title	Writer(s)	Producer(s)	Length
1.	"Gimme Your Love"		Maurice Starr, Baker^{[a]}	4:15
2.	"She Gives Me a Bang"		Starr, Baker^{[a]}	4:00
3.	"Is This the End"		Starr, Baker^{[a]}	4:11
4.	"Pass the Beat"	Arthur Baker, Maurice Starr, M.C. Globe	Baker, Starr	4:38
5.	"Popcorn Love"		Starr, Baker^{[a]}	4:52
6.	"Candy Girl"		Starr, Baker^{[a]}	3:54
7.	"Ooh Baby"	Arthur Baker, Tina Klein-Baker, Maurice Starr	Baker, Starr	3:56
8.	"Should Never Have Told Me"		Starr, Baker^{[a]}	4:06
9.	"Gotta Have Your Lovin'"	Arthur Baker, Maurice Starr, Michael Jonzun	Starr, Baker^{[a]}	4:50
10.	"Jealous Girl"		Starr, Baker^{[a]}	4:58
Total length:				43:40

25th Anniversary edition bonus tracks
No.	Title	Length
11.	"Candy Girl (12" Edit)"	7:20
12.	"Candy Girl (Singalong Version)"	7:08
Total length:		58:08

Notes

- ^a signifies a co-producer

== Personnel ==
- Arthur Baker – executive producer, producer, mixer, Roland and Linn drums, sound effects
- Maurice Starr – producer, arrangement, mixer, bass guitar, lead guitar, synthesizer, Fender Rhodes, acoustic piano, drums, vocoder
- Paul McCraven – executive producer
- Michael Jonzun – co-arrangement, producer
- Fred Torchio – recording
- James Mace – recording
- Frank Heller – engineer, mix engineer, tambourine
- Bobby Brown – lead and backing vocals
- Michael Bivins – lead and backing vocals
- Ralph Tresvant – lead and backing vocals
- Ricky Bell – lead and backing vocals
- Ronnie DeVoe – lead and backing vocals
- Tina B. – additional vocals
- Bashiri Johnson – percussion
- Jimmy Johnson Jr. – percussion
- Gordon Worthy – keyboards

== Charts ==
Chart (1983)	Peak position
US Billboard Top LPs & Tape	90
