= Popcorn Love =

1983 single by New Edition

Single by New Edition

from the album Candy Girl
- B-side: "Jealous Girl"
- Released: August 6, 1983
- Recorded: 1982
- Studio: Unique Recording Studios
- Genre: R&B; soul; bubblegum pop
- Length: 4:52 (album version); 3:45 (single version); 7:27 (instrumental version)
- Label: Streetwise
- Songwriters: Maurice Starr, Michael Jonzun
- Producer: Maurice Starr

New Edition singles chronology
"Is This the End" (1983)	"Popcorn Love" (1983)	"She Gives Me a Bang" (1984)

Music video
- "Popcorn Love" on YouTube

"Popcorn Love" is a single by New Edition, released on August 6, 1983. It was released as the third single from their debut album, Candy Girl on the Streetwise label. The single read #25 on the R&B chart.

== Charts ==
Chart (1983–84)	Peak position
Australia (Kent Music Report)	73
UK Singles Chart	43
U.S. Billboard Hot Black Singles	25

== Cover versions and samples ==
"Jealous Girl"

Single by Another Bad Creation

from the album Coolin' at the Playground Ya Know!
- Released: July 23, 1991
- Recorded: Spring 1990
- Genre: R&B
- Length: 5:38
- Label: Motown
- Songwriters: Maurice Starr, Michael Jonzun

Another Bad Creation singles chronology
"Playground" (1991)	"Jealous Girl" (1991)	"Spydermann" (1991)

Harlem World sampled Popcorn Love in their song I Really Like It. Another Bad Creation covered "Popcorn Love"'s flip side, "Jealous Girl" (in a slightly extended version) on July 23, 1991, which also reached #25 on the R&B chart. Mase recorded a parody of "Jealous Girl" for his Harlem World album, called "Jealous Guy", with him, 112 and Puff Daddy singing like New Edition but with altered lyrics.
