= Candy Girl (New Edition song) =

Single by New Edition

from the album Candy Girl
- Released: February 24, 1983
- Recorded: 1982
- Studio: Unique Recording Studios, New York City
- Genre: R&B, bubblegum pop, funk, post-disco
- Length: 3:52; 6:58 (12')
- Label: Streetwise; Warlock
- Songwriters: Maurice Starr; Michael Jonzun
- Producers: Maurice Starr; Michael Jonzun

New Edition singles chronology
| "Candy Girl" (1983) | "Is This the End" (1983) |

Music video
- "Candy Girl" on YouTube

"Candy Girl" is the debut single by New Edition from their debut album of the same name. It was released as a single in late February 1983 and the song hit number one on the UK Singles Chart, becoming the 31st-best-selling single of the year. It also peaked at number 1 on the Hot Black Singles chart, passing Michael Jackson’s song "Beat It" on May 14, 1983.

"Candy Girl" established New Edition as a bubblegum pop group with stylings from contemporary R&B.

== History ==
New Edition was first discovered and mentored by their manager Brooke Payne. He entered them in a local talent show where they met songwriter/producer Maurice Starr who wrote "Candy Girl" for the group, envisioning them as a 1980s answer to the Jackson 5. Ralph Tresvant was positioned as the lead singer, because Starr considered his childish high tenor as reminiscent of a younger Michael Jackson, while having members Ricky Bell and Bobby Brown sharing alternate leads.

The 12" version features producers Starr and Michael Jonzun doing some additional instrumentation in the outro.

=== Release and reaction ===
Released as a single in February 1983 before the album was released, the song made a slow ascent up the chart, peaking on June 25, 1983, at number 46 on the Billboard Hot 100 singles chart singles chart, and number 1 on the R&B singles chart in the US. It was most successful in the UK, where it peaked at number 1 for one week in May 1983.

== Personnel ==
- Ralph Tresvant: lead and background vocals; rap
- Bobby Brown: lead and background vocals; rap
- Ricky Bell: lead and background vocals; rap
- Michael Bivins: rap and background vocals
- Ronnie DeVoe: rap and background vocals

== Charts ==
=== Weekly charts ===
| Chart (1983–1984) | Peak position |
|---|---|
| Australia (Kent Music Report) | 10 |
| Belgium (Ultratop 50 Flanders) | 13 |
| Canada Top Singles (RPM) | 11 |
| Ireland (IRMA) | 2 |
| Netherlands (Dutch Top 40) | 13 |
| Netherlands (Single Top 100) | 16 |
| New Zealand (Recorded Music NZ) | 2 |
| South Africa (Springbok Radio) | 1 |
| Spain Airplay (Top 40 Radio) | 32 |
| UK Singles (Official Charts) | 1 |
| US Billboard Hot 100 | 46 |
| US Dance Club Songs (Billboard) | 17 |
| US Hot Black Singles (Billboard) | 1 |
| West Germany (GfK) | 22 |

=== Year-end charts ===
| Chart (1983) | Position |
|---|---|
| Australia (Kent Music Report) | 76 |
| New Zealand (Recorded Music NZ) | 24 |
| South Africa (Springbok Radio) | 12 |
| UK Singles (Official Charts Company) | 33 |

== Certifications ==
| Region | Certification | Certified units/sales |
|---|---|---|
| United Kingdom (BPI) | Silver | 250,000^{^} |
^{^} Shipments figures based on certification alone.
