= Lip Sync Battle. Ustawka =

2016 Polish reality TV series

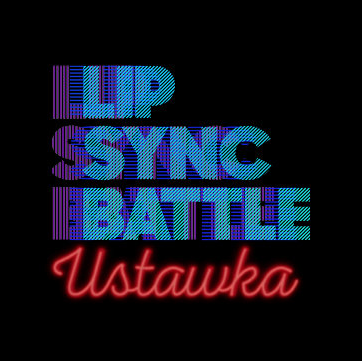
- Genre: Reality competition
- Based on: Lip Sync Battle (U.S. TV series)
- Presented by: Natalia Jakuła; Piotr Kędzierski
- Country of origin: Poland
- Original language: Polish
- No. of series: 1
- No. of episodes: 12

Production
- Running time: 25 minutes
- Production company: Golden Media Polska

Original release
- Network: Player.pl
- Release: 27 January – 6 April 2016

Lip Sync Battle. Ustawka is a Polish reality competition series based on the American show of the same name. It premiered on Player.pl on 27 January 2016. It is hosted by Natalia Jakuła and Piotr Kędzierski.

The concept of lip syncing was introduced on the American chat show Late Night with Jimmy Fallon, in which celebrities battle each other with lip sync performances. It has been used as a recurring segment on The Tonight Show Starring Jimmy Fallon before being developed as a separate show.

== Episodes ==
=== Season 1 (2016) ===
Winners are listed in bold

No.	Contestants	Original release date
1	**Krystian Wieczorek** vs. Maja Bohosiewicz	January 27, 2016
Wieczorek: "You're Beautiful" by James Blunt "Cztery osiemnastki" by Tomasz Niecik Bohosiewicz: "Dirty Diana" by Popek "My Humps" by The Black Eyed Peas
2	**Sylwester Wardęga** vs. Maffashion	January 27, 2016
Wardęga: "Cancion del Mariachi" by Los Lobos & Antonio Banderas "The Fox (What Does the Fox Say?)" by Ylvis Maffashion: "Granda" by Monika Brodka "Problem" by Ariana Grande & Iggy Azalea
3	**Michał Koterski** vs. Edyta Herbuś	February 3, 2016
Koterski: "I Want To Break Free" by Queen "Chandelier" by Sia Herbuś: "Joe le taxi" by Vanessa Paradis "Barbie Girl" by Aqua
4	Michał Baryza vs. **Barbara Kurdej-Szatan**	February 10, 2016
Baryza: "Hera Koka Hasz LSD" by Karolina Czarnecka "Sexy and I Know It" by LMFAO Kurdej-Szatan: "Smells Like Teen Spirit" by Nirvana "Fancy" by Iggy Azalea
5	**Stuu** vs. Saszan	February 17, 2016
Stuu: "The Lazy Song" by Bruno Mars "Wrecking Ball" by Miley Cyrus Saszan: "Crazy In Love" by Beyoncé "Bitch Better Have My Money " by Rihanna
6	**Czesław Mozil** vs. Osi Ugonoh	February 24, 2016
Mozil: "I Kissed a Girl" by Katy Perry "La Isla Bonita" by Madonna Ugonoh: "Naucz mnie" by Sarsa "Single Ladies (Put a Ring on It)" by Beyoncé
7	**Marta Wierzbicka** vs. Antoni Królikowski	March 2, 2016
Wierzbicka: "Thrift Shop" by Macklemore & Ryan Lewis "Nie mogę cię zapomnieć" by Agnieszka Chylińska Królikowski: "Hero" by Enrique Iglesias "Piękniejsza" by K.A.S.A.
8	**Adam Zdrójkowski** vs. Artur Kapecki	March 9, 2016
Zdrójkowski: Kapecki:
