= Stuart Burton =

Stuart Burton may refer to:

- Stuart Burton (politician)
- Stuart Burton (YouTuber)
