= List of Year in Search top searches =

Annual list of top browsing searches

Year in Search (formerly Google Zeitgeist) is an annual list compiled and published by Google since 2001. The report highlights the most popular online search trends of the year, based on aggregate data from searches conducted worldwide, as tracked by Google Trends. It includes top search queries in various categories, both at a global level and for individual countries.

Starting in 2010, Google uploaded their Year in Search videos to their YouTube channel.

== Year in Search lists ==
=== 2000s ===
Year	Category	Top Search	Note
2001	Male celebrities	"Nostradamus"	
2001	Female celebrities	"Britney Spears"	
2001	Consumer brands	"Nokia"	
2001	Movies	"Harry Potter"	
2001	TV shows	"Loft Story"	
2001	Music services	"Morpheus"	
2001	Musicians	"Beatles"	
2001	New products	"Windows XP"	
2001	News outlets	"CNN"	
2001	Retailers	"Amazon"	
2001	Games	"Counterstrike"	
2001	Sports	"Anna Kournikova"	
2002	Male celebrities	"Eminem"	
2002	Female celebrities	"Britney Spears"	
2002	Consumer brands	"Ferrari"	
2002	Movies	"Spiderman"	
2002	TV shows	"The Simpsons"	
2002	Fictional characters	"The Simpsons"	
2002	Musicians	"Eminem"	
2002	News	"World Cup"	
2002	Retailers	"IKEA"	
2002	Technology	"MP3"	
2002	Travel destination	"Paris"	
2002	Games	"The Sims"	
2002	Sports	"David Beckham"	
2003	Male celebrities	"Eminem"	"Britney Spears", the most searched term of the year.
2003	Female celebrities	"Britney Spears"	"Britney Spears", the most searched term of the year.
2003	Consumer brands	"Ferrari"	"Britney Spears", the most searched term of the year.
2003	Fictional characters	"The Simpsons"	"Britney Spears", the most searched term of the year.
2003	News	"Iraq"	"Britney Spears", the most searched term of the year.
2004	Public figures	"George W. Bush"	"Britney Spears", the most searched term of the year.
2004	Male celebrities	"Orlando Bloom"	"Britney Spears", the most searched term of the year.
2004	Female celebrities	"Britney Spears"	"Britney Spears", the most searched term of the year.
2004	Passings	"Nicholas Berg"	"Britney Spears", the most searched term of the year.
2004	Consumer brands	"eBay"	"Britney Spears", the most searched term of the year.
2004	Companies	"SCO"	"Britney Spears", the most searched term of the year.
2004	Entertainment	"Spa"	"Britney Spears", the most searched term of the year.
2004	TV shows	"The Simpsons"	"Britney Spears", the most searched term of the year.
2004	Fictional characters	"The Simpsons"	"Britney Spears", the most searched term of the year.
2004	News outlets	"CNN"	"Britney Spears", the most searched term of the year.
2004	Retailers	"Walmart"	"Britney Spears", the most searched term of the year.
2004	Hotel chains	"Holiday Inn"	"Britney Spears", the most searched term of the year.
2004	Foods	"Pizza"	"Britney Spears", the most searched term of the year.
2004	Technology	"Wallpaper"	"Britney Spears", the most searched term of the year.
2004	Sports	"David Beckham"	"Britney Spears", the most searched term of the year.
2005	Not published	N/A	"Janet Jackson", the most searched term of the year.
2006	Passings	"Aaron Spelling"	"Bebo", the most searched term of the year.
2006	News	"Paris Hilton"	"Bebo", the most searched term of the year.
2007	News	"American Idol"	
2008	Passings	"Heath Ledger"	
2008	News outlets	"Fox"	
2008	Social networks	"Facebook"	
2008	Movie trailers	"Dark Knight"	
2008	TV shows	"American Idol"	
2008	Olympic sports	"Gymnastics"	
2009	Entertainment	"Michael Jackson"	
2009	Food & Drink	"Acai Berry"	
2009	Sports	"Real Madrid"	

=== 2010s ===
Year	Category	Top Search	Note
2010	Entertainment	"Justin Bieber"	Justin Bieber, the most searched person of the year.
2010	Electronics	"iPad"	Justin Bieber, the most searched person of the year.
2010	Food & Drink	"MasterChef"	Justin Bieber, the most searched person of the year.
2010	Health	"HCG Diet"	Justin Bieber, the most searched person of the year.
2010	Sports	"Mundial 2010"	Justin Bieber, the most searched person of the year.
2011	Entertainment	"Rebecca Black"	Big Meech, the most searched person of the year.
2011	Electronics	"Amazon Kindle Fire"	Big Meech, the most searched person of the year.
2011	Food & Drink	"Wendy's"	Big Meech, the most searched person of the year.
2011	Sports	"Mayweather vs. Ortiz"	Big Meech, the most searched person of the year.
2012	Artists	"Whitney Houston"	"Whitney Houston", the most searched term of the year.
2012	Events	"Hurricane Sandy"	"Whitney Houston", the most searched term of the year.
2012	Airlines	"Southwest Airlines"	"Whitney Houston", the most searched term of the year.
2012	Electronics	"iPad 3"	"Whitney Houston", the most searched term of the year.
2012	Feature films	"The Hunger Games"	"Whitney Houston", the most searched term of the year.
2012	TV shows	"BBB12"	"Whitney Houston", the most searched term of the year.
2012	Videos	"Gangnam Style"	"Whitney Houston", the most searched term of the year.
2012	Images	"One Direction"	"Whitney Houston", the most searched term of the year.
2012	Athletes	"Jeremy Lin"	"Whitney Houston", the most searched term of the year.
2013	Artists	"Cory Monteith"	Nelson Mandela, the most searched person of the year.
2013	Events	"Boston Marathon"	Nelson Mandela, the most searched person of the year.
2013	Electronics	"iPhone 5s"	Nelson Mandela, the most searched person of the year.
2013	Movies	"Man of Steel"	Nelson Mandela, the most searched person of the year.
2013	TV shows	"Under the Dome"	Nelson Mandela, the most searched person of the year.
2013	Videos	"The Fox"	Nelson Mandela, the most searched person of the year.
2013	Athletes	"Oscar Pistorius"	Nelson Mandela, the most searched person of the year.
2014	Passings	"Robin Williams"	Jennifer Lawrence, the most searched person of the year. "Robin Williams", the most searched term of the year.
2014	News	"Ebola"	Jennifer Lawrence, the most searched person of the year. "Robin Williams", the most searched term of the year.
2014	Electronics	"iPhone 6"	Jennifer Lawrence, the most searched person of the year. "Robin Williams", the most searched term of the year.
2014	Videos	"Mutant Giant Spider Dog"	Jennifer Lawrence, the most searched person of the year. "Robin Williams", the most searched term of the year.
2014	Athletes	"James Rodriguez"	Jennifer Lawrence, the most searched person of the year. "Robin Williams", the most searched term of the year.
2015	Artists	"Adele"	"Lamar Odom", the most searched term of the year.
2015	Passings	"Bobbi Kristina"	"Lamar Odom", the most searched term of the year.
2015	Technology	"iPhone 6s"	"Lamar Odom", the most searched term of the year.
2015	News	"Charlie Hebdo"	"Lamar Odom", the most searched term of the year.
2015	Movies	"Jurassic World	"Lamar Odom", the most searched term of the year.
2015	TV shows	"Big Brother Brazil"	"Lamar Odom", the most searched term of the year.
2015	Sports events	"Copa America"	"Lamar Odom", the most searched term of the year.
2016	Artists	"Celine Dion"	Donald Trump, the most searched person of the year. Pokémon Go, the most searched term of the year.
2016	Passings	"Prince"	Donald Trump, the most searched person of the year. Pokémon Go, the most searched term of the year.
2016	Technology	"iPhone 7"	Donald Trump, the most searched person of the year. Pokémon Go, the most searched term of the year.
2016	News	"US Election"	Donald Trump, the most searched person of the year. Pokémon Go, the most searched term of the year.
2016	Movies	"Deadpool	Donald Trump, the most searched person of the year. Pokémon Go, the most searched term of the year.
2016	TV shows	"Stranger Things"	Donald Trump, the most searched person of the year. Pokémon Go, the most searched term of the year.
2016	Sports events	"Rio Olympics"	Donald Trump, the most searched person of the year. Pokémon Go, the most searched term of the year.
2017	Actors	"Meghan Markle"	Matt Lauer, the most searched person of the year. "Hurricane Irma", the most searched term of the year.
2017	Musicians	"Ariana Grande"	Matt Lauer, the most searched person of the year. "Hurricane Irma", the most searched term of the year.
2017	Passings	"Tom Petty"	Matt Lauer, the most searched person of the year. "Hurricane Irma", the most searched term of the year.
2017	Technology	"iPhone 8"	Matt Lauer, the most searched person of the year. "Hurricane Irma", the most searched term of the year.
2017	News	"Hurricane Irma"	Matt Lauer, the most searched person of the year. "Hurricane Irma", the most searched term of the year.
2017	Food recipes	"Chicken Breast"	Matt Lauer, the most searched person of the year. "Hurricane Irma", the most searched term of the year.
2017	Movies	"IT"	Matt Lauer, the most searched person of the year. "Hurricane Irma", the most searched term of the year.
2017	TV shows	"Stranger Things"	Matt Lauer, the most searched person of the year. "Hurricane Irma", the most searched term of the year.
2017	Songs	"Despacito"	Matt Lauer, the most searched person of the year. "Hurricane Irma", the most searched term of the year.
2017	Sports events	"Wimbledon"	Matt Lauer, the most searched person of the year. "Hurricane Irma", the most searched term of the year.
2018	Actors	"Sylvester Stallone"	Meghan Markle, the most searched person of the year. "World Cup", the most searched term of the year.
2018	Musicians	"Demi Lovato"	Meghan Markle, the most searched person of the year. "World Cup", the most searched term of the year.
2018	Passings	"Avicii"	Meghan Markle, the most searched person of the year. "World Cup", the most searched term of the year.
2018	News	"World Cup"	Meghan Markle, the most searched person of the year. "World Cup", the most searched term of the year.
2018	Movies	"Black Panther"	Meghan Markle, the most searched person of the year. "World Cup", the most searched term of the year.
2018	TV shows	"延禧攻略"	Meghan Markle, the most searched person of the year. "World Cup", the most searched term of the year.
2018	Athletes	"Tristan Thompson"	Meghan Markle, the most searched person of the year. "World Cup", the most searched term of the year.
2019	Actors	"Jussie Smollett"	Antonio Brown, the most searched person of the year. "India vs South Africa", the most searched term of the year.
2019	Passings	"Cameron Boyce"	Antonio Brown, the most searched person of the year. "India vs South Africa", the most searched term of the year.
2019	News	"Copa America"	Antonio Brown, the most searched person of the year. "India vs South Africa", the most searched term of the year.
2019	Movies	"Avengers: Endgame"	Antonio Brown, the most searched person of the year. "India vs South Africa", the most searched term of the year.
2019	TV shows	"Game of Thrones"	Antonio Brown, the most searched person of the year. "India vs South Africa", the most searched term of the year.
2019	Songs	"Old Town Road"	Antonio Brown, the most searched person of the year. "India vs South Africa", the most searched term of the year.
2019	Athletes	"Antonio Brown"	Antonio Brown, the most searched person of the year. "India vs South Africa", the most searched term of the year.

=== 2020s ===
Year	Category	Top Search	Note
2020	Actors	"Tom Hanks"	Joe Biden, the most searched person of the year. "Coronavirus", the most searched term of the year.
2020	Passings	"Kobe Bryant"	Joe Biden, the most searched person of the year. "Coronavirus", the most searched term of the year.
2020	News	"Coronavirus"	Joe Biden, the most searched person of the year. "Coronavirus", the most searched term of the year.
2020	Food recipes	"Dalgona Coffee"	Joe Biden, the most searched person of the year. "Coronavirus", the most searched term of the year.
2020	Concert	"Together at Home"	Joe Biden, the most searched person of the year. "Coronavirus", the most searched term of the year.
2020	Movies	"Parasite"	Joe Biden, the most searched person of the year. "Coronavirus", the most searched term of the year.
2020	TV shows	"Tiger King"	Joe Biden, the most searched person of the year. "Coronavirus", the most searched term of the year.
2020	Songs	"WAP"	Joe Biden, the most searched person of the year. "Coronavirus", the most searched term of the year.
2020	Games	"Among Us"	Joe Biden, the most searched person of the year. "Coronavirus", the most searched term of the year.
2020	Athletes	"Ryan Newman"	Joe Biden, the most searched person of the year. "Coronavirus", the most searched term of the year.
2021	Actors	"Alec Baldwin"	Alec Baldwin, the most searched person of the year. "Australia vs India", the most searched term of the year.
2021	Passings	"DMX"	Alec Baldwin, the most searched person of the year. "Australia vs India", the most searched term of the year.
2021	News	"Afghanistan"	Alec Baldwin, the most searched person of the year. "Australia vs India", the most searched term of the year.
2021	Foods	"Birria Tacos"	Alec Baldwin, the most searched person of the year. "Australia vs India", the most searched term of the year.
2021	Movies	"Eternals"	Alec Baldwin, the most searched person of the year. "Australia vs India", the most searched term of the year.
2021	TV shows	"Squid Game"	Alec Baldwin, the most searched person of the year. "Australia vs India", the most searched term of the year.
2021	Songs	"drivers license"	Alec Baldwin, the most searched person of the year. "Australia vs India", the most searched term of the year.
2021	Games	"PopCat"	Alec Baldwin, the most searched person of the year. "Australia vs India", the most searched term of the year.
2021	Athletes	"Christian Eriksen"	Alec Baldwin, the most searched person of the year. "Australia vs India", the most searched term of the year.
2021	Sports teams	"Real Madrid CF"	Alec Baldwin, the most searched person of the year. "Australia vs India", the most searched term of the year.
2022	Actors	"Johnny Depp"	Johnny Depp, the most searched person of the year. "Wordle", the most searched term of the year.
2022	Passings	"Queen Elizabeth"	Johnny Depp, the most searched person of the year. "Wordle", the most searched term of the year.
2022	News	"Ukraine"	Johnny Depp, the most searched person of the year. "Wordle", the most searched term of the year.
2022	Food recipes	"पनीर पसंदा"	Johnny Depp, the most searched person of the year. "Wordle", the most searched term of the year.
2022	Movies	"Thor: Love and Thunder"	Johnny Depp, the most searched person of the year. "Wordle", the most searched term of the year.
2022	TV shows	"Euphoria"	Johnny Depp, the most searched person of the year. "Wordle", the most searched term of the year.
2022	Songs	"Tak Ingin Usai"	Johnny Depp, the most searched person of the year. "Wordle", the most searched term of the year.
2022	Sports	"World Cup"	Johnny Depp, the most searched person of the year. "Wordle", the most searched term of the year.
2022	Athletes	"Novak Djokovic"	Johnny Depp, the most searched person of the year. "Wordle", the most searched term of the year.
2023	Actors	"Jeremy Renner"	Damar Hamlin, the most searched person of the year.
2023	Passings	"Matthew Perry"	Damar Hamlin, the most searched person of the year.
2023	News	"War in Israel and Gaza"	Damar Hamlin, the most searched person of the year.
2023	Food recipes	"Bibimbap"	Damar Hamlin, the most searched person of the year.
2023	Movies	"Barbie"	Damar Hamlin, the most searched person of the year.
2023	TV shows	"The Last of Us"	Damar Hamlin, the most searched person of the year.
2023	Musicians	"Shakira"	Damar Hamlin, the most searched person of the year.
2023	Songs	"アイドル"	Damar Hamlin, the most searched person of the year.
2023	Games	"Hogwarts Legacy"	Damar Hamlin, the most searched person of the year.
2023	Athletes	"Damar Hamlin"	Damar Hamlin, the most searched person of the year.
2023	Sports teams	"Inter Miami CF"	Damar Hamlin, the most searched person of the year.
2024	Actors	"Katt Williams"	Donald Trump, the most searched person of the Year. "Copa América", the most searched term of the Year.
2024	Passings	"Liam Payne"	Donald Trump, the most searched person of the Year. "Copa América", the most searched term of the Year.
2024	News	"U.S Election"	Donald Trump, the most searched person of the Year. "Copa América", the most searched term of the Year.
2024	Food recipes	"Olympic chocolate muffins"	Donald Trump, the most searched person of the Year. "Copa América", the most searched term of the Year.
2024	Movies	"Inside Out 2"	Donald Trump, the most searched person of the Year. "Copa América", the most searched term of the Year.
2024	TV shows	"Baby Reindeer"	Donald Trump, the most searched person of the Year. "Copa América", the most searched term of the Year.
2024	Musicians	"Diddy"	Donald Trump, the most searched person of the Year. "Copa América", the most searched term of the Year.
2024	Songs	"Not Like Us"	Donald Trump, the most searched person of the Year. "Copa América", the most searched term of the Year.
2024	Games	"Connections"	Donald Trump, the most searched person of the Year. "Copa América", the most searched term of the Year.
2024	Athletes	"Imane Khelif"	Donald Trump, the most searched person of the Year. "Copa América", the most searched term of the Year.
2024	Sports teams	"New York Yankees"	Donald Trump, the most searched person of the Year. "Copa América", the most searched term of the Year.
2025	Actors	"Mikey Madison"	D4vd, the most searched person of the Year. "Gemini", the most searched term of the Year.
2025	Passings	"Charlie Kirk"	D4vd, the most searched person of the Year. "Gemini", the most searched term of the Year.
2025	News	"Charlie Kirk assassination"	D4vd, the most searched person of the Year. "Gemini", the most searched term of the Year.
2025	Food recipes	"Hot Honey"	D4vd, the most searched person of the Year. "Gemini", the most searched term of the Year.
2025	Movies	"Anora"	D4vd, the most searched person of the Year. "Gemini", the most searched term of the Year.
2025	TV shows	"Monster: The Ed Gein Story"	D4vd, the most searched person of the Year. "Gemini", the most searched term of the Year.
2025	Books	"Regretting You"	D4vd, the most searched person of the Year. "Gemini", the most searched term of the Year.
2025	Games	"ARC Raiders"	D4vd, the most searched person of the Year. "Gemini", the most searched term of the Year.
2025	Athletes	"Terence Crawford"	D4vd, the most searched person of the Year. "Gemini", the most searched term of the Year.
2025	Sports teams	"Paris Saint-Germain FC"	D4vd, the most searched person of the Year. "Gemini", the most searched term of the Year.
