= Lip Sync Battle =

American musical reality competition television series

- Logo for the first three seasons
- Genre: Reality competition
- Created by: John Krasinski; Stephen Merchant
- Directed by: Beth McCarthy-Miller
- Presented by: LL Cool J Chrissy Teigen
- Theme music composer: Marc Bolan; Robert Ginyard
- Opening theme: "20th Century Boy" performed by T. Rex (seasons 1–3) "It Takes Two" performed by Rob Base & DJ E-Z Rock (season 4–5)
- Country of origin: United States
- Original language: English
- No. of seasons: 5
- No. of episodes: 91 (list of episodes)

Production
- Executive producers: John Krasinski; Jimmy Fallon; David Larzelere; Stephen Merchant; Casey Patterson; Jay Peterson; Rick Schwartz
- Producer: LL Cool J
- Camera setup: Multiple-camera setup
- Running time: 23 minutes
- Production companies: Eight Million Plus Productions; Matador Content; Sunday Night Productions; Four Eyes Entertainment; Casey Patterson Entertainment

Original release
- Network: Paramount Network (Note: Known as Spike until the Soul Train special, including the first 3 seasons. The first episode broadcast as Paramount Network was the Michael Jackson special.)
- Release: April 2, 2015 – June 27, 2019

Related
- Lip Sync Battle Shorties

Lip Sync Battle is an American musical reality competition television series that premiered on April 2, 2015, on the American cable network Spike, later known as Paramount Network. The show is based on an idea by Stephen Merchant and John Krasinski, in which celebrities battle each other with lip sync performances. The idea was introduced as a recurring segment on Late Night with Jimmy Fallon and later The Tonight Show Starring Jimmy Fallon, before being developed into a separate show.

The premiere episode was the highest-rated premiere in Spike's history. Lip Sync Battle has been a hit show for the network. The series' success has led to the creation of various international adaptations. In August 2018, the show was renewed for a fifth season which premiered on January 17, 2019.

On September 22, 2020, it was announced that the series would move to another ViacomCBS network as part of the Paramount Network's now-scrapped planned shift to films. However, no new home for the program was ever announced.

== Overview ==
Lip Sync Battle debuted on Spike on April 2, 2015. The game pits two celebrities against each other in a lip syncing battle, where each contestant lip syncs two songs as though they were actually singing them, with choreography, production values, etc, treating it like a full concert production. The host then asks the audience who won, with the winner being the contestant that gets the most and loudest cheering. The winner then receives a Lip Sync Battle belt reminiscent of the WCW Television Championship title belt. The program had a large number of celebrity contestants from all aspects of popular culture, including actors, singers, tv stars, movie stars, theater stars, most showing hidden talents for impersonating famous singers that the audience was previously unaware of.

It

was produced by John Krasinski and Stephen Merchant and hosted by rapper and actor LL Cool J. Model Chrissy Teigen serves as color commentator.

The show is a spin-off of a segment first introduced on Late Night with Jimmy Fallon. Merchant, Krasinski and Emily Blunt, were brainstorming ideas for Krasinski's upcoming appearance on Late Night when the idea took shape. Jimmy Fallon then developed it into a recurring segment on his show.

In 2014, Merchant, Krasinski and Fallon pitched the show to NBC, who passed on it, despite the attention the Late Night segment got, particularly when Emma Stone lip synched DJ Khaled's "All I Do Is Win". NBC's cable channels USA Network and Bravo also passed. The competition series was eventually picked up by Spike, which was then rebranding. "Part of what I wanted to do with Lip Sync Battle is increase co-viewing, but also add diversity to the network," said network president Kevin Kay.

Lip Sync Battle has been a major success for Spike. Its series premiere drew 2.2 million viewers, the channel's highest-rated non-scripted premiere. Kay described the show as "a television and viral rock star for Spike." The show was renewed for a second season of 20 episodes on April 22, 2015.

In January 2016, the network renewed the series for a third season consisting of another 20 episodes. "Lip Sync Battle is a multiplatform pop-culture phenomenon that has played an integral role in delivering a new and broader audience to Spike," Kay said. This season notably featured a contest between Zendaya and Tom Holland, then rumored to be a couple, with Holland winning by channeling Rihanna by wearing latex shorts, a halter-style top, fishnet stockings and bright red lipstick while lip synching to her song "Umbrella". Holland began the performance with a lip-sync to Gene Kelly's rendition of "Singin' in the Rain" from Singin' in the Rain (1952), before switching to "Umbrella".

In July 2016, the show received a Primetime Emmy Award nomination in the Outstanding Structured Reality Program category.

In 2017, it was announced that the show would air a live hour-long special (Lip Sync Battle Live: A Michael Jackson Celebration) on January 18, 2018, to coincide with the relaunch of Spike as the Paramount Network. Neil Patrick Harris, Taraji P. Henson and Hailee Steinfeld were announced as the first set of performers for the Michael Jackson-themed special, which originated from the Dolby Theatre and included a presentation from Cirque du Soleil's Las Vegas residency Michael Jackson: One.

On August 22, 2018, the show was renewed for a fifth season consisting of 12 episodes that premiered on January 17, 2019.

== Episodes ==
Season	Episodes	Originally released	
Season	Episodes	First released	Last released
1	18	April 2, 2015	August 20, 2015
Christmas		November 19, 2015	
2	21	January 7, 2016	June 23, 2016
Live		September 11, 2016	
3	24	October 12, 2016	July 19, 2017
Hip Hop		October 10, 2017	
Soul Train		November 25, 2017	
Michael Jackson		January 18, 2018	
4	17	January 25, 2018	October 29, 2018
5	13	January 17, 2019	June 27, 2019

== Reception ==
=== Critical response ===
Josef Adalian in Vulture said that Lip Sync Battle is "looking like a legitimate hit, both on TV and online." He also added that the show's creators "opted not to impose artificial demographic targets. They also went out of their way not to futz up the very simple premise that worked so well on Fallon’s late-night shows." Amy Amatangelo of The Hollywood Reporter said that the debut of the show "had moments of great fun," although she added that the series "still seems like it is better suited as an interlude on The Tonight Show," and that "some things are better in small doses." Adelle Platon of Vibe wrote that the show "is a welcome break from other singing shows crowding primetime," also adding that "with the in-house crowd serving as judges, the spirit of competition between both parties makes it a fun-for-all". Emily Yahr from The Washington Post was more negative towards the show by saying that "taking out all the spontaneity and replacing it with the cheesy-slick production values of an American Idol group medley, Lip Sync Battle will probably wear out its welcome soon."

=== Ratings ===
The series premiere of Lip Sync Battle delivered 2.2 million total viewers and a 1.3 rating in the Nielsen ratings 18–49 demographic. The episode notched the largest viewership for an unscripted series debut in the network's history and the largest average audience in the slot in more than eight years. The total audience for the first several episodes of the show, including DVR replays and multiple reruns, has climbed past 15 million television viewers. Spike has also stated that various performance clips from the first three half-hour episodes of the show had already generated nearly 100 million online streams, as of April 2015.

In Australia, the series premiere scored 1.124 million viewers in preliminary overnight viewership, making it the fourth most-watched program on free-to-air television for the evening. The second episode the following week scored 1.087 million preliminary overnight viewers and was ranked the fifth-highest-rated program on free-to-air television of the night. This success has led to suggestions by commentators that a local adaption could be imminent.

== International versions ==
Country	Title	Network	Host	Premiere
Brazil	Batalha do Lip Sync	TV Globo	Luciano Huck	August 14, 2022
Canada (Quebec)	Lip Sync Battle: Face à Face	MusiquePlus/V	Joel Legendre; Marie-Soleil Dion	October 2, 2015
Chile	Lip Sync Chile	TVN	Karen Doggenweiler	July 6, 2015
China	Lip Sync Battle; Chinese: 对口型大作战	Shenzhen TV/Sohu	Nic Li; Yu Shasha	January 29, 2016
Hungary	Playback párbaj	RTL Spike/RTL Klub	Laci Gáspár; Zsófi Szabó	December 2, 2016
Indonesia	Celebrity Lip Sync Battle	NET.	Ananda Omesh	October 12, 2015
India	Lip Sing Battle	Star Plus	Farah Khan	September 16, 2017
Italy	Lip Sync Battle (part of Tú sí que vales)	Canale 5	Martín Castrogiovanni; Alessio Sakara; Elisabetta Canalis	September 27, 2025
Mexico	Lip Sync Mexico	Comedy Central/Azteca 7	Nicky Jam; Adriana Ron Pedrique	July 6, 2016
Panama	Lip Sync Battle Panamá	TVMax	Ingrid De Ycaza; Miguel Oyola; Franklyn Robinson	July 28, 2016
Peru	Los reyes del playback	Latina	Cristian Rivero; Jesús Alzamora; Jazmín Pinedo	February 15, 2016
Philippines	Lip Sync Battle Philippines	GMA Network	Michael V. Iya Villania	February 27, 2016
Poland	Lip Sync Battle. Ustawka	player.pl	Natalia Jakuła; Piotr Kędzierski	January 27, 2016
Portugal	Lip Sync Portugal – Playback Total	SIC	César Mourão; João Manzarra	January 13, 2019
Russia	Короли фанеры Koroli fanery (Note: Plywood is a Russian slang term for "lip-sync record".)	Channel One Russia	Pavel Priluchnyy; Yana Koshkina	September 16, 2017
South Africa	Lip Sync Battle Africa	MTV Africa e.tv	Pearl Thusi; D'Banj	April 14, 2016
Thailand	Lip Sync Battle Thailand	ONE HD 31 (Season 1); GMM 25 (Season 2)	Niti Chaichitathorn; Panisara Arayasakul (Season 1); Thanakrit Panichwit (Season 2)	July 17, 2017
Ukraine	Ліпсінк батл Lipsync batl	1+1	Potap; Tina Karol (Season 1); Lesia Nikitiuk (Season 2)	March 6, 2021
United Kingdom	Lip Sync Battle UK	Channel 5	Mel B Professor Green	January 8, 2016
Vietnam	Kỳ Phùng Địch Thủ – Lip Sync Battle	HTV7	Vân Sơn; Ngọc Trinh; Trấn Thành	August 6, 2016

== Spin-off ==
A one-hour special, hosted by Sarah Hyland, aired on Nickelodeon on December 11, 2016 (followed by a repeat airing on Spike on December 14). In March 2017, a series order was announced for the kid-centered spin-off. In August 2017, it was announced that Nick Cannon would be replacing Sarah Hyland as the host and that JoJo Siwa would be joining him as his sidekick on Lip Sync Battle Shorties, which premiered in early 2018. It ended in 2019.

== See also ==
- Lip Service
- Your Face Sounds Familiar
