= List of Lip Sync Battle episodes =

Lip Sync Battle is an American musical reality competition television series that premiered on April 2, 2015, on the American cable network Spike, later known as Paramount Network. The show is based on an idea by Stephen Merchant and John Krasinski, in which celebrities battle each other with lip sync performances. The idea was introduced as a recurring segment on Late Night with Jimmy Fallon and later The Tonight Show Starring Jimmy Fallon, before being developed into a separate show. The premiere episode was the highest-rated premiere in Spike's history. Lip Sync Battle has been a hit show for the network. The series' success has led to the creation of various international adaptations. In August 2018, the show was renewed for a fifth season which premiered on January 17, 2019. In September 2020, it was announced that the series would move to another ViacomCBS network as part of the Paramount Network's now-scrapped planned shift to films. However, no new home for the program has been announced since then.

During the course of the series, 91 episodes of Lip Sync Battle aired over five seasons, including five specials.

== Series overview ==
Season	Episodes	Originally released	
Season	Episodes	First released	Last released
1	18	April 2, 2015	August 20, 2015
Christmas		November 19, 2015	
2	21	January 7, 2016	June 23, 2016
Live		September 11, 2016	
3	24	October 12, 2016	July 19, 2017
Hip Hop		October 10, 2017	
Soul Train		November 25, 2017	
Michael Jackson		January 18, 2018	
4	17	January 25, 2018	October 29, 2018
5	13	January 17, 2019	June 27, 2019

== Episodes ==
=== Season 1 (2015) ===
Note: Winners are listed in bold

No. overall	No. in season	Title	Celebrities	Song(s) performed	Original release date	US viewers (millions)
1	1	**Dwayne Johnson** vs. Jimmy Fallon	Johnson	"Shake It Off" by Taylor Swift "Stayin' Alive" by Bee Gees	April 2, 2015	2.20
1	1	**Dwayne Johnson** vs. Jimmy Fallon	Fallon	"Jump in the Line (Shake, Senora)" by Harry Belafonte "Like a Prayer" by Madonna	April 2, 2015	2.20
2	2	**Common** vs. John Legend	Common	"I Want You Back" by Jackson 5 "All Night Long" by Lionel Richie	April 2, 2015	2.00
2	2	**Common** vs. John Legend	Legend	"Slow Motion" by Juvenile "U Can't Touch This" by MC Hammer	April 2, 2015	2.00
3	3	**Anne Hathaway** vs. Emily Blunt	Hathaway	"Love" by Mary J. Blige "Wrecking Ball" by Miley Cyrus	April 9, 2015	1.83
3	3	**Anne Hathaway** vs. Emily Blunt	Blunt	"No Diggity" by Blackstreet "Piece of My Heart" by Big Brother and the Holding Company	April 9, 2015	1.83
4	4	**Anna Kendrick** vs. John Krasinski	Kendrick	"Steal My Girl" by One Direction "Booty" by Jennifer Lopez & Pitbull	April 16, 2015	1.75
4	4	**Anna Kendrick** vs. John Krasinski	Krasinski	"Bye Bye Bye" by NSYNC "Proud Mary" by Tina Turner	April 16, 2015	1.75
Special appearance by Jennifer Lopez.
5	5	**Terry Crews** vs. Mike Tyson	Crews	"Sucker M.C.'s" by Run–D.M.C. "A Thousand Miles" by Vanessa Carlton	April 23, 2015	1.51
5	5	**Terry Crews** vs. Mike Tyson	Tyson	"(I Can't Get No) Satisfaction" by The Rolling Stones "Push It" by Salt-N-Pepa	April 23, 2015	1.51
6	6	**Hoda Kotb** vs. Michael Strahan	Kotb	"Baby Got Back" by Sir Mix-a-Lot "Uptown Funk" by Mark Ronson & Bruno Mars	April 30, 2015	1.27
6	6	**Hoda Kotb** vs. Michael Strahan	Strahan	"London Bridge" by Fergie "Poison" by Bell Biv DeVoe	April 30, 2015	1.27
Special appearance by Bell Biv DeVoe.
7	7	**Stephen Merchant** vs. Malin Åkerman	Merchant	"Hero" by Enrique Iglesias "Dirrty" by Christina Aguilera feat. Redman	May 7, 2015	1.30
7	7	**Stephen Merchant** vs. Malin Åkerman	Åkerman	"Pour Some Sugar on Me" by Def Leppard "Talk Dirty" by Jason Derulo	May 7, 2015	1.30
8	8	**Julianne Hough** vs. Derek Hough	Julianne Hough	"All About That Bass" by Meghan Trainor "I Just Had Sex" by The Lonely Island	May 14, 2015	1.54
8	8	**Julianne Hough** vs. Derek Hough	Derek Hough	"Can't Hold Us" by Macklemore & Ryan Lewis "Chandelier" by Sia	May 14, 2015	1.54
Special appearance by Meghan Trainor.
9	9	**Sandra Denton** (Pepa) vs. Cheryl James (Salt)	Pepa	"Firework" by Katy Perry "I Will Survive" by Gloria Gaynor	May 21, 2015	1.35
9	9	**Sandra Denton** (Pepa) vs. Cheryl James (Salt)	Salt	"Since U Been Gone" by Kelly Clarkson "It's Tricky" by Run–D.M.C.	May 21, 2015	1.35
10	10	**Queen Latifah** vs. Marlon Wayans	Latifah	"My Lovin' (You're Never Gonna Get It)" by En Vogue "Rock the Bells" by LL Cool J	May 28, 2015	1.91
10	10	**Queen Latifah** vs. Marlon Wayans	Wayans	"Happy" by Pharrell Williams "Stay with Me" by Sam Smith	May 28, 2015	1.91
11	11	**Alison Brie** vs. Will Arnett	Brie	"Shoop" by Salt-n-Pepa "Bang Bang" by Jessie J, Ariana Grande, and Nicki Minaj	July 9, 2015	1.27
11	11	**Alison Brie** vs. Will Arnett	Arnett	"Who Let the Dogs Out?" by Baha Men "Everything Is Awesome" by Tegan and Sara featuring The Lonely Island	July 9, 2015	1.27
12	12	**Deion Sanders** vs. Justin Bieber	Sanders	"Play That Funky Music" by Wild Cherry "Like a Virgin" by Madonna	July 16, 2015	1.48
12	12	**Deion Sanders** vs. Justin Bieber	Bieber	"Big Girls Don't Cry" by Fergie "Crazy Train" by Ozzy Osbourne	July 16, 2015	1.48
13	13	**Willie Geist** vs. Andy Cohen	Geist	"9 to 5" by Dolly Parton "I Need Love" by LL Cool J	July 23, 2015	1.22
13	13	**Willie Geist** vs. Andy Cohen	Cohen	"I Found Someone" by Cher "Working for the Weekend" by Loverboy	July 23, 2015	1.22
14	14	**Gregg Sulkin** vs. Victoria Justice	Sulkin	"I Believe in a Thing Called Love" by The Darkness "Milkshake" by Kelis	July 30, 2015	1.16
14	14	**Gregg Sulkin** vs. Victoria Justice	Justice	"Total Eclipse of the Heart" by Bonnie Tyler "Hot in Herre" by Nelly	July 30, 2015	1.16
15	15	**Ilana Glazer** vs. Abbi Jacobson	Glazer	"Hey Ya!" by Outkast "It's Raining Men" by The Weather Girls	August 6, 2015	0.81
15	15	**Ilana Glazer** vs. Abbi Jacobson	Jacobson	"The Humpty Dance" by Digital Underground "And I'm Telling You I'm Not Going" by Jennifer Holliday	August 6, 2015	0.81
16	16	**Iggy Azalea** vs. Nick Young	Azalea	"Teenage Dirtbag" by Wheatus "Freak Me" by Silk	August 13, 2015	1.03
16	16	**Iggy Azalea** vs. Nick Young	Young	"Sugar" by Maroon 5 "Here I Go Again" by Whitesnake	August 13, 2015	1.03
17	17	Terrence Howard vs. Taraji P. Henson (Part 1)	Howard	"I'll Make Love to You" by Boyz II Men	August 20, 2015	1.42
17	17	Terrence Howard vs. Taraji P. Henson (Part 1)	Henson	"Just Fine" by Mary J. Blige	August 20, 2015	1.42
Special appearance by Mary J. Blige.
18	18	**Terrence Howard** vs. Taraji P. Henson (Part 2)	Howard:	"Brick House" by Commodores	August 20, 2015	1.38
18	18	**Terrence Howard** vs. Taraji P. Henson (Part 2)	Henson	"Material Girl" by Madonna	August 20, 2015	1.38
Special duet: "It's Hard out Here for a Pimp" (from Hustle & Flow) by Terrence Howard (as DJay) and Taraji P. Henson (as Shug), written by Three 6 Mafia and Frayser Boy

=== Christmas special (2015) ===
Title	Celebrities	Song(s) performed	Original release date	US viewers (millions)
**Joseph Gordon-Levitt** vs. Anthony Mackie	Gordon-Levitt	"Yeah" by Usher "Rhythm Nation" by Janet Jackson	November 19, 2015	1.13
**Joseph Gordon-Levitt** vs. Anthony Mackie	Mackie	"I Kissed a Girl" by Katy Perry "2 Legit 2 Quit" by MC Hammer	November 19, 2015	1.13
Special performance: "Christmas in Hollis" (originally performed by Run-DMC), by Joseph Gordon-Levitt, Anthony Mackie, Seth "Seth on a Shelf" Rogen & Run-DMC. The usual opening theme ("20th Century Boy" by T. Rex) was replaced with "Christmas Tree" by Lady Gaga featuring Space Cowboy for this episode.

=== Season 2 (2016) ===
Note: Winners are listed in bold

No. overall	No. in season	Title	Celebrities	Song(s) performed	Original release date	US viewers (millions)
19	1	**Channing Tatum** vs. **Jenna Dewan Tatum** (tie)	Tatum	"Let It Go" by Idina Menzel "Run the World (Girls)" by Beyoncé	January 7, 2016	2.50
19	1	**Channing Tatum** vs. **Jenna Dewan Tatum** (tie)	Dewan Tatum	"Cold Hearted" by Paula Abdul "Pony" by Ginuwine	January 7, 2016	2.50
Special appearances by Quentin Tarantino, Adam Rodriguez, Paula Abdul, Eva Longoria and Beyoncé.
20	2	**Olivia Munn** vs. Kevin Hart	Munn	"Dilemma" by Nelly and Kelly Rowland "Bad Blood" by Taylor Swift	January 14, 2016	2.29
20	2	**Olivia Munn** vs. Kevin Hart	Hart	"OMG" by Usher and will.i.am "Slam" by Onyx	January 14, 2016	2.29
Special appearances by Big Show, Chanel Iman, Charlotte McKinney and Jaime King.
21	3	**Tracee Ellis Ross** vs. Anthony Anderson	Ellis Ross	"Super Bass" by Nicki Minaj "Love Is a Battlefield" by Pat Benatar	January 21, 2016	1.42
21	3	**Tracee Ellis Ross** vs. Anthony Anderson	Anderson	"Do Me!" by Bell Biv DeVoe "Forget You" by CeeLo Green	January 21, 2016	1.42
22	4	**Josh Gad** vs. Kaley Cuoco	Gad	"How Will I Know" by Whitney Houston "I Touch Myself" by Divinyls	January 28, 2016	1.54
22	4	**Josh Gad** vs. Kaley Cuoco	Cuoco	"Move Bitch" by Ludacris featuring Mystikal and I-20 "I'm a Slave 4 U" by Britney Spears	January 28, 2016	1.54
Special appearance by Johnny Galecki.
23	5	**Tim Tebow** vs. Nina Dobrev	Tebow	"Take Your Time" by Sam Hunt "Eye of the Tiger" by Survivor	February 4, 2016	1.44
23	5	**Tim Tebow** vs. Nina Dobrev	Dobrev	"Let's Get It On" by Marvin Gaye "Cheerleader" by OMI	February 4, 2016	1.44
24	6	**Eva Longoria** vs. Hayden Panettiere	Longoria	"Low" by Flo Rida featuring T-Pain "Anaconda" by Nicki Minaj	February 11, 2016	1.24
24	6	**Eva Longoria** vs. Hayden Panettiere	Panettiere	"One Way or Another" by Blondie "Lady Marmalade" by Christina Aguilera, Lil' Kim, Mýa and Pink	February 11, 2016	1.24
Special appearance by Christina Aguilera.
25	7	**Gabriel Iglesias** vs. Randy Couture	Iglesias	"I Wanna Sex You Up" by Color Me Badd "Hot Stuff" by Donna Summer	February 18, 2016	1.35
25	7	**Gabriel Iglesias** vs. Randy Couture	Couture	"My Prerogative" by Bobby Brown "Physical" by Olivia Newton-John	February 18, 2016	1.35
26	8	**Gigi Hadid** vs. Tyler Posey	Hadid	"That's Not My Name" by The Ting Tings "Larger Than Life" by Backstreet Boys	February 25, 2016	1.02
26	8	**Gigi Hadid** vs. Tyler Posey	Posey	"Flagpole Sitta" by Harvey Danger "Take On Me" by A-ha	February 25, 2016	1.02
Special appearances by AJ McLean and Nick Carter from Backstreet Boys.
27	9	**Sonequa Martin-Green** vs. Lauren Cohan	Martin-Green	"I Wanna Dance with Somebody (Who Loves Me)" by Whitney Houston "Watch Me (Whip/Nae Nae)" by Silentó	March 31, 2016	1.04
27	9	**Sonequa Martin-Green** vs. Lauren Cohan	Cohan	"Sister Christian" by Night Ranger "Flashdance... What a Feeling" by Irene Cara	March 31, 2016	1.04
28	10	**Katharine McPhee** vs. Jason Derulo	McPhee	"Shake It Fast" by Mystikal "Want to Want Me" by Jason Derulo	April 7, 2016	1.09
28	10	**Katharine McPhee** vs. Jason Derulo	Derulo	"Pony" by Ginuwine "Super Freak" by Rick James	April 7, 2016	1.09
29	11	**NeNe Leakes** vs. Todd Chrisley	Leakes	"Respect" by Aretha Franklin "Supermodel (You Better Work)" by RuPaul	April 14, 2016	1.21
29	11	**NeNe Leakes** vs. Todd Chrisley	Chrisley	"Blurred Lines" by Robin Thicke "Man! I Feel Like a Woman!" by Shania Twain	April 14, 2016	1.21
30	12	**Clark Gregg** vs. Hayley Atwell	Gregg	"Rump Shaker" by Wreckx-n-Effect "Toxic" by Britney Spears	April 21, 2016	1.07
30	12	**Clark Gregg** vs. Hayley Atwell	Atwell	"Pretty Fly (for a White Guy)" by The Offspring "Bad Romance" by Lady Gaga	April 21, 2016	1.07
Special appearance by Jennifer Grey.
31	13	**Jim Rash** vs. Joel McHale	Rash	"Something He Can Feel" by En Vogue "So What" by P!nk	April 28, 2016	0.81
31	13	**Jim Rash** vs. Joel McHale	McHale	"I Bet My Life" by Imagine Dragons "It's Oh So Quiet" by Björk	April 28, 2016	0.81
32	14	**Snoop Dogg** vs. Chris Paul	Dogg	"Could You Be Loved" by Bob Marley and the Wailers "Don't Stop Believin'" by Journey	May 5, 2016	1.04
32	14	**Snoop Dogg** vs. Chris Paul	Paul	"Gin and Juice" by Snoop Dogg "Candy Girl" by New Edition	May 5, 2016	1.04
Special appearance by DeAndre Jordan.
33	15	**Gina Rodriguez** vs. Wilmer Valderrama	Rodriguez	"A Milli" by Lil Wayne "Free Your Mind" by En Vogue	May 12, 2016	0.99
33	15	**Gina Rodriguez** vs. Wilmer Valderrama	Valderrama	"Livin' la Vida Loca" by Ricky Martin "Everybody (Backstreet's Back)" by Backstreet Boys	May 12, 2016	0.99
34	16	**Josh Peck** vs. Christina Milian	Peck	"What Do You Mean?" by Justin Bieber "Thong Song" by Sisqo	May 19, 2016	0.86
34	16	**Josh Peck** vs. Christina Milian	Milian	"Baby" by Justin Bieber "Waiting for Tonight" by Jennifer Lopez	May 19, 2016	0.86
35	17	**CeeLo Green** vs. Russell Peters	Green	"Rapper's Delight" by The Sugarhill Gang "Rock and Roll All Nite" by Kiss	May 26, 2016	0.80
35	17	**CeeLo Green** vs. Russell Peters	Peters	"December, 1963 (Oh, What a Night)" by The Four Seasons "Every Little Step" by Bobby Brown	May 26, 2016	0.80
Special appearance by Mini Kiss
36	18	**Shaquille O'Neal** vs. Aisha Tyler	O'Neal	"Love Shack" by The B-52's "Maniac" by Michael Sembello	June 2, 2016	0.94
36	18	**Shaquille O'Neal** vs. Aisha Tyler	Tyler	"Basketball" by Kurtis Blow "Poker Face" by Lady Gaga	June 2, 2016	0.94
37	19	**Zoe Saldaña** vs. Zachary Quinto	Saldaña	"Stressed Out" by Twenty One Pilots "No Scrubs" by TLC	June 9, 2016	0.87
37	19	**Zoe Saldaña** vs. Zachary Quinto	Quinto	"Freedom! '90" by George Michael "Get Ur Freak On" by Missy Elliott	June 9, 2016	0.87
Special appearances by Cindy Crawford, Tionne "T-Boz" Watkins, and Rozonda "Chilli" Thomas.
38	20	**Michael Shannon** vs. Rachel Bloom	Shannon	"Here Comes Your Man" by Pixies "It's the End of the World as We Know It (And I Feel Fine)" by R.E.M.	June 16, 2016	0.92
38	20	**Michael Shannon** vs. Rachel Bloom	Bloom	"I Want It That Way" by Backstreet Boys "Teenage Dream" by Katy Perry	June 16, 2016	0.92
39	21	**Brent Morin** vs. Chris D'Elia	Morin	"Higher" by Creed "ABC" by The Jackson 5	June 23, 2016	1.12
39	21	**Brent Morin** vs. Chris D'Elia	D'Elia	"Cool for the Summer" by Demi Lovato "Wiggle" by Jason Derulo featuring Snoop Dogg	June 23, 2016	1.12

=== Live special (2016) ===
Title	Celebrities	Song(s) performed	Original release date	US viewers (millions)
Terry Crews vs. Olivia Munn vs. John Legend vs. **Michael Phelps**	Crews	"Fight the Power" by Public Enemy	September 11, 2016	0.81
Terry Crews vs. Olivia Munn vs. John Legend vs. **Michael Phelps**	Munn	"Cheap Thrills" by Sia	September 11, 2016	0.81
Terry Crews vs. Olivia Munn vs. John Legend vs. **Michael Phelps**	Legend	"Hey Ya!" by OutKast	September 11, 2016	0.81
Terry Crews vs. Olivia Munn vs. John Legend vs. **Michael Phelps**	Phelps	"Lose Yourself" by Eminem	September 11, 2016	0.81
Special performance: "Let's Get It Started" by Black Eyed Peas performed by the entire company Special appearances by Stephen Merchant, Simone Biles, Aly Raisman, Lynn and Rick Raisman, and Stevie Wonder.

=== Season 3 (2016–17) ===
Note: Winners are listed in bold

No. overall	No. in season	Title	Celebrities	Song(s) performed	Original release date	US viewers (millions)
40	1	**Ben Kingsley** vs. John Cho	Kingsley	"Every Breath You Take" by The Police "Rocket Man" by Elton John	October 12, 2016	0.86
40	1	**Ben Kingsley** vs. John Cho	Cho	"Da Ya Think I'm Sexy?" by Rod Stewart "Wanted Dead or Alive" by Bon Jovi	October 12, 2016	0.86
41	2	**America Ferrera** vs. Amber Tamblyn	Ferrera	"Gossip Folks" by Missy Elliott featuring Ludacris "Conga" by Miami Sound Machine	October 19, 2016	0.56
41	2	**America Ferrera** vs. Amber Tamblyn	Tamblyn	"You Oughta Know" by Alanis Morissette "I Wanna Sex You Up" by Color Me Badd	October 19, 2016	0.56
42	3	**Samira Wiley** vs. Laverne Cox	Wiley	"Un-Break My Heart" by Toni Braxton "O.P.P." by Naughty by Nature	October 26, 2016	0.58
42	3	**Samira Wiley** vs. Laverne Cox	Cox	"Roman's Revenge" by Nicki Minaj featuring Eminem "Lose My Breath" by Destiny's Child	October 26, 2016	0.58
Special appearances by Naughty by Nature and the UCLA Bruin Marching Band.
43	4	**Lupita Nyong'o** vs. Regina Hall	Nyong'o	"Bailando" by Enrique Iglesias "Whatta Man" by Salt-N-Pepa featuring En Vogue	November 2, 2016	0.50
43	4	**Lupita Nyong'o** vs. Regina Hall	Hall	"My Boo" by Ghost Town DJ's "Earned It" by The Weeknd	November 2, 2016	0.50
44	5	**Rob Riggle** vs. Jeff Dye	Riggle	"Express Yourself" by N.W.A "Girlfriend" by Avril Lavigne	November 9, 2016	0.53
44	5	**Rob Riggle** vs. Jeff Dye	Dye	"This Is How We Do It" by Montell Jordan "The Beautiful People" by Marilyn Manson	November 9, 2016	0.53
45	6	**Sam Richardson** vs. T.J. Miller	Richardson	"Part-Time Lover" by Stevie Wonder "Hot Blooded" by Foreigner	November 16, 2016	0.46
45	6	**Sam Richardson** vs. T.J. Miller	Miller	"Save the Best for Last" by Vanessa Williams "Just Dance" by Lady Gaga	November 16, 2016	0.46
46	7	**Dustin Lynch** vs. Cassadee Pope	Lynch	"What's Your Fantasy" by Ludacris "Mambo No. 5" by Lou Bega	December 21, 2016	0.84
46	7	**Dustin Lynch** vs. Cassadee Pope	Pope	"Complicated" by Avril Lavigne "I Write Sins Not Tragedies" by Panic! at the Disco	December 21, 2016	0.84
The usual opening theme ("20th Century Boy" by T. Rex) was replaced with "Run, Run Rudolph" for this episode. Special appearance by Brendon Urie.
47	8	**Don Cheadle** vs. Wanda Sykes	Cheadle	"Real Love" by Mary J. Blige "Mo Money Mo Problems" by The Notorious B.I.G. featuring Puff Daddy and Ma$e	January 12, 2017	0.84
47	8	**Don Cheadle** vs. Wanda Sykes	Sykes	"U.N.I.T.Y." by Queen Latifah "Faith" by George Michael	January 12, 2017	0.84
Special appearance by Ma$e.
48	9	**Craig Ferguson** vs. Jay Leno	Ferguson	"I Wanna Be Sedated" by Ramones "Take a Chance on Me" by ABBA	January 19, 2017	0.90
48	9	**Craig Ferguson** vs. Jay Leno	Leno	"Ballroom Blitz" by Sweet "My World Is Empty Without You" by The Supremes	January 19, 2017	0.90
49	10	**Milla Jovovich** vs. Ruby Rose	Jovovich	"Boyz-n-the-Hood" by Eazy-E "White Wedding" by Billy Idol	January 26, 2017	0.91
49	10	**Milla Jovovich** vs. Ruby Rose	Rose	"Bitch" by Meredith Brooks "Raise Your Glass" by P!nk	January 26, 2017	0.91
50	11	**Ray Lewis** vs. Tony Gonzalez	Lewis	"Let's Stay Together" by Al Green "Hot in Herre" by Nelly	February 2, 2017	0.63
50	11	**Ray Lewis** vs. Tony Gonzalez	Gonzalez	"The Humpty Dance" by Digital Underground "Whip It" by Devo	February 2, 2017	0.63
Special appearance by Nelly.
51	12	**Sarah Hyland** vs. DeAndre Jordan	Hyland	"Right Through You" by Alanis Morissette "Don't Cha" by The Pussycat Dolls	February 9, 2017	0.75
51	12	**Sarah Hyland** vs. DeAndre Jordan	Jorda	"Kiss from a Rose" by Seal "Panda" by Desiigner	February 9, 2017	0.75
Special appearance by Nicole Scherzinger.
52	13	**Ricky Martin** vs. Kate Upton	Martin	"Old Time Rock And Roll" by Bob Seger "Footloose" by Kenny Loggins	April 20, 2017	0.89
52	13	**Ricky Martin** vs. Kate Upton	Upton	"I'm Different" by 2 Chainz "…Baby One More Time" by Britney Spears	April 20, 2017	0.89
53	14	**Taye Diggs** vs. Ne-Yo	Diggs	"Let Me Love You (Until You Learn to Love Yourself)" by Ne-Yo "Vogue" by Madonna	April 27, 2017	0.65
53	14	**Taye Diggs** vs. Ne-Yo	Ne-Yo	"Candy" by Cameo "Motownphilly" by Boyz II Men	April 27, 2017	0.65
54	15	**Nicole Richie** vs. John Michael Higgins	Richie	"Ice Ice Baby" by Vanilla Ice "Good Vibrations" by Marky Mark and the Funky Bunch	May 4, 2017	0.64
54	15	**Nicole Richie** vs. John Michael Higgins	Higgins	"Owner of a Lonely Heart" by Yes "It's Not Unusual" by Tom Jones	May 4, 2017	0.64
55	16	**Tom Holland** vs. Zendaya	Holland	"Ride Wit Me" by Nelly featuring City Spud "Singin' in the Rain" by Gene Kelly/ "Umbrella" by Rihanna	May 7, 2017	0.69
55	16	**Tom Holland** vs. Zendaya	Zendaya	"Tyrone" by Erykah Badu "24K Magic" by Bruno Mars	May 7, 2017	0.69
This episode originally aired on MTV before the 2017 MTV Movie & TV Awards. Special appearance by John Legend.
56	17	**Matt McGorry** vs. Bellamy Young	McGorry	"Shake Your Groove Thing" by Peaches & Herb "Work from Home" by Fifth Harmony	May 11, 2017	0.66
56	17	**Matt McGorry** vs. Bellamy Young	Young	"On the Radio" by Donna Summer "Born This Way" by Lady Gaga	May 11, 2017	0.66
57	18	**Bryshere Gray** vs. Rumer Willis	Gray	"Summertime" by DJ Jazzy Jeff & The Fresh Prince "We Are Never Ever Getting Back Together" by Taylor Swift	May 18, 2017	0.75
57	18	**Bryshere Gray** vs. Rumer Willis	Willis	"Hit 'Em Up Style (Oops!)" by Blu Cantrell "If I Could Turn Back Time" by Cher	May 18, 2017	0.75
58	19	The cast of Stranger Things	Finn Wolfhard	"Buddy Holly" by Weezer	May 25, 2017	0.57
58	19	The cast of Stranger Things	Noah Schnapp	"Moves Like Jagger" by Maroon 5 featuring Christina Aguilera	May 25, 2017	0.57
58	19	The cast of Stranger Things	Gaten Matarazzo	"50 Ways to Say Goodbye" by Train	May 25, 2017	0.57
58	19	The cast of Stranger Things	**Caleb McLaughlin**	"I'm Bad" by LL Cool J	May 25, 2017	0.57
59	20	**Skylar Astin** vs. Metta World Peace	Astin	"Where Are Ü Now" by Jack Ü featuring Justin Bieber "M.I.L.F. $" by Fergie	June 21, 2017	0.57
59	20	**Skylar Astin** vs. Metta World Peace	World Peace	"Insane in the Brain" by Cypress Hill "Roar" by Katy Perry	June 21, 2017	0.57
60	21	**Danielle Brooks** vs. Uzo Aduba	Brooks	"1, 2 Step" by Ciara featuring Missy Elliott "Livin' on a Prayer" by Bon Jovi	June 28, 2017	0.64
60	21	**Danielle Brooks** vs. Uzo Aduba	Aduba	"B.O.B" by OutKast "Fight Song" by Rachel Platten	June 28, 2017	0.64
Special appearance by Rachel Platten.
61	22	**Ashley Graham** vs. Jermaine Fowler	Graham	"Treat You Better" by Shawn Mendes "That Don't Impress Me Much" by Shania Twain	June 28, 2017	0.66
61	22	**Ashley Graham** vs. Jermaine Fowler	Fowler	"Bohemian Rhapsody" by Queen "Flashing Lights" by Kanye West featuring Dwele	June 28, 2017	0.66
62	23	**Nick Swardson** vs. Theresa Caputo	Swardson	"Summer of '69" by Bryan Adams "Ex's & Oh's" by Elle King	July 12, 2017	0.67
62	23	**Nick Swardson** vs. Theresa Caputo	Caputo	"I Gotta Feeling" by The Black Eyed Peas "Girls Just Want to Have Fun" by Cyndi Lauper	July 12, 2017	0.67
63	24	**David Spade** vs. Nina Agdal	Spade	"White Lines (Don't Don't Do It)" by Grandmaster Melle Mel "Wake Me Up Before You Go-Go" by Wham!	July 19, 2017	0.76
63	24	**David Spade** vs. Nina Agdal	Agdal	"My Humps" by The Black Eyed Peas "Lose Control" by Missy Elliott featuring Ciara & Fat Man Scoop	July 19, 2017	0.76

=== Hip Hop special (2017) ===
Title	Celebrities	Song(s) performed	Original release date	US viewers (millions)
**Remy Ma** vs. T-Pain vs. Anika Noni Rose vs. Jay Pharoah	Remy Ma	"Put Your Hands Where My Eyes Could See" by Busta Rhymes	October 10, 2017	0.66
**Remy Ma** vs. T-Pain vs. Anika Noni Rose vs. Jay Pharoah	T-Pain	"Stand Up" by Ludacris	October 10, 2017	0.66
**Remy Ma** vs. T-Pain vs. Anika Noni Rose vs. Jay Pharoah	Rose	"Come Down" by Anderson Paak	October 10, 2017	0.66
**Remy Ma** vs. T-Pain vs. Anika Noni Rose vs. Jay Pharoah	Pharoah	"Jesus Walks" by Kanye West	October 10, 2017	0.66

=== Soul Train special (2017) ===
Title	Celebrities	Song(s) performed	Original release date	US viewers (millions)
Loni Love vs. Tank vs. Macy Gray vs. **Keyshia Cole**	Love	"My Prerogative" by Bobby Brown	November 25, 2017	0.76
Loni Love vs. Tank vs. Macy Gray vs. **Keyshia Cole**	Tank	"Give It to Me Baby" by Rick James	November 25, 2017	0.76
Loni Love vs. Tank vs. Macy Gray vs. **Keyshia Cole**	Gray	"WTF (Where They From)" by Missy Elliott	November 25, 2017	0.76
Loni Love vs. Tank vs. Macy Gray vs. **Keyshia Cole**	Cole	"Car Wash" by Rose Royce	November 25, 2017	0.76
Special appearance by Bobby Brown.

=== Michael Jackson Celebration (2018) ===
Title	Celebrities	Song(s) performed	Original release date	US viewers (millions)
Neil Patrick Harris vs. Laverne Cox vs. Taraji P. Henson vs. **Hailee Steinfeld**	Harris	"Smooth Criminal"	January 18, 2018	1.05
Neil Patrick Harris vs. Laverne Cox vs. Taraji P. Henson vs. **Hailee Steinfeld**	Cox	"Dirty Diana"	January 18, 2018	1.05
Neil Patrick Harris vs. Laverne Cox vs. Taraji P. Henson vs. **Hailee Steinfeld**	Henson	"Beat It"	January 18, 2018	1.05
Neil Patrick Harris vs. Laverne Cox vs. Taraji P. Henson vs. **Hailee Steinfeld**	Steinfeld	"The Way You Make Me Feel"	January 18, 2018	1.05
Special performances: "Wanna Be Startin' Somethin'" performed by the cast "Bad" performed by Michael Jackson: One from Cirque du Soleil Notes: This special was recorded live from the Dolby Theatre.; Special appearances by John Legend, Luna Stephens and Nuno Bettencourt.; First episode to be broadcast from the newly relaunched Paramount Network.

=== Season 4 (2018) ===
Note: Winners are listed in bold

No. overall	No. in season	Title	Celebrities	Song(s) performed	Original release date	US viewers (millions)
64	1	Christina Aguilera Tribute: **Taye Diggs** vs. Erika Jayne	Diggs	"Beautiful" "Candyman"	January 25, 2018	0.59
64	1	Christina Aguilera Tribute: **Taye Diggs** vs. Erika Jayne	Jayne	"Fighter" "Genie in a Bottle"	January 25, 2018	0.59
Note: Christina Aguilera herself appears as a guest of honor.
65	2	Fifth Harmony	Normani	"Bootylicious" by Destiny's Child	February 1, 2018	0.46
65	2	Fifth Harmony	Lauren Jauregui	"Rehab" by Amy Winehouse	February 1, 2018	0.46
65	2	Fifth Harmony	**Ally Brooke**	"Como la Flor" by Selena/"On the Floor" by Jennifer Lopez featuring Pitbull	February 1, 2018	0.46
65	2	Fifth Harmony	Dinah Jane	"You're Welcome" by Dwayne Johnson	February 1, 2018	0.46
66	3	**Johnny Weir** vs. Tara Lipinski	Weir	"My Heart Will Go On" by Celine Dion "Paparazzi" by Lady Gaga	February 8, 2018	0.44
66	3	**Johnny Weir** vs. Tara Lipinski	Lipinski	"All I Do Is Win" by DJ Khaled feat. T-Pain, Ludacris, Rick Ross and Snoop Dogg "Hollaback Girl" by Gwen Stefani	February 8, 2018	0.44
67	4	**LaVar Ball** vs. Lonzo Ball	LaVar Ball	"Hate Me Now" by Nas feat. Puff Daddy "Jungle Love" by The Time	February 15, 2018	0.44
67	4	**LaVar Ball** vs. Lonzo Ball	Lonzo Ball	"Humble" by Kendrick Lamar "Bad and Boujee" by Migos feat. Lil Uzi Vert	February 15, 2018	0.44
68	5	**Kathy Bates** vs. Tone Bell	Bates	"Hip Hop Hooray" by Naughty by Nature "That's What I Like" by Bruno Mars	February 22, 2018	0.63
68	5	**Kathy Bates** vs. Tone Bell	Bell	"Green Light" by John Legend "Party All the Time" by Eddie Murphy	February 22, 2018	0.63
69	6	**Luis Fonsi** vs. Joan Smalls	Fonsi	"Tubthumping" by Chumbawamba "It's Gonna Be Me" by NSYNC	March 1, 2018	0.49
69	6	**Luis Fonsi** vs. Joan Smalls	Smalls	"Despacito" by Luis Fonsi and Daddy Yankee "Black Beatles" by Rae Sremmurd feat. Gucci Mane	March 1, 2018	0.49
70	7	Pentatonix	Scott Hoying	"Side to Side" by Ariana Grande feat. Nicki Minaj	March 8, 2018	0.48
70	7	Pentatonix	Mitch Grassi	"Bon Appetit" by Katy Perry	March 8, 2018	0.48
70	7	Pentatonix	Kirstin Maldonado	"Look What You Made Me Do" by Taylor Swift	March 8, 2018	0.48
70	7	Pentatonix	**Kevin Olusola**	"Love Me Now" by John Legend	March 8, 2018	0.48
71	8	**Rob Schneider** vs. Jeff Ross	Schneider	"Jealous" by Nick Jonas "I Will Survive" by Gloria Gaynor	March 15, 2018	0.43
71	8	**Rob Schneider** vs. Jeff Ross	Ross	"American Girl" by Tom Petty and the Heartbreakers "Fat Bottomed Girls" by Queen	March 15, 2018	0.43
72	9	**Pete Davidson** vs. Michael Bolton	Davidson	"One Time" by Justin Bieber "Jack Sparrow" by The Lonely Island feat. Michael Bolton	March 22, 2018	1.35
72	9	**Pete Davidson** vs. Michael Bolton	Bolton	"Love Yourself" by Justin Bieber "Gangsta's Paradise" by Coolio feat. L.V.	March 22, 2018	1.35
73	10	**Rita Ora** vs. Charli XCX	Ora	"I'm Too Sexy" by Right Said Fred "Wannabe" by Spice Girls	March 29, 2018	2.13
73	10	**Rita Ora** vs. Charli XCX	XCX	"C'est la Vie" by B*Witched "Shape of You" by Ed Sheeran	March 29, 2018	2.13
Boy George appears as a guest DJ.
74	11	**Alicia Silverstone** vs. Mena Suvari	Silverstone	"Cryin'" by Aerosmith "Fancy" by Iggy Azalea featuring Charli XCX	June 14, 2018	2.48
74	11	**Alicia Silverstone** vs. Mena Suvari	Suvari	"Son of a Preacher Man" by Dusty Springfield "Groove Is in the Heart" by Deee-Lite	June 14, 2018	2.48
75	12	Shania Twain Tribute: **Derek Hough** vs. Nicole Scherzinger	Hough	"Any Man of Mine" "From This Moment On"	June 21, 2018	0.58
75	12	Shania Twain Tribute: **Derek Hough** vs. Nicole Scherzinger	Scherzinger	"You're Still the One" "Man! I Feel Like a Woman!"	June 21, 2018	0.58
Note: Shania Twain herself appears as a guest of honor.
76	13	**Melissa Gorga** vs. Ramona Singer	Gorga	"Before He Cheats" by Carrie Underwood "When I Grow Up" by The Pussycat Dolls	June 28, 2018	0.43
76	13	**Melissa Gorga** vs. Ramona Singer	Singer:	"Milkshake" by Kelis "Oops... I Did It Again" by Britney Spears	June 28, 2018	0.43
77	14	**Karrueche Tran** vs. Deon Cole	Tran	"Let Me Blow Ya Mind" by Eve feat. Gwen Stefani "Bodak Yellow (Money Moves)" by Cardi B	July 12, 2018	0.37
77	14	**Karrueche Tran** vs. Deon Cole	Cole	"I Ain't No Joke" by Eric B. & Rakim "Torn" by Natalie Imbruglia	July 12, 2018	0.37
78	15	**Rachel Lindsay** vs. Ben Higgins	Lindsay	"Shoop" by Salt-N-Pepa "Sorry Not Sorry" by Demi Lovato	July 19, 2018	0.35
78	15	**Rachel Lindsay** vs. Ben Higgins	Higgins	"Call Me Maybe" by Carly Rae Jepsen "You Give Love a Bad Name" by Bon Jovi	July 19, 2018	0.35
Special appearances by Nick Viall, Wells Adams and Bryan Abasolo
79	16	**Naya Rivera** vs. Lil Rel Howery	Rivera	"I Don't Fuck with You" by Big Sean feat. E-40 "Barbie Girl" by Aqua	July 26, 2018	0.40
79	16	**Naya Rivera** vs. Lil Rel Howery	Howery	"Redbone" by Childish Gambino "Ghostbusters" by Ray Parker Jr.	July 26, 2018	0.40
Special appearance by Ray Parker Jr.
80	17	**Melanie Field** vs. Brendan Scannell	Field	"I Have Nothing" by Whitney Houston "Confident" by Demi Lovato	October 29, 2018	0.28
80	17	**Melanie Field** vs. Brendan Scannell	Scannell	"Maybe This Time" by Liza Minnelli "Mamma Mia" by ABBA	October 29, 2018	0.28

=== Season 5 (2019) ===
Note: Winners are listed in bold

No. overall	No. in season	Title	Celebrities	Song(s) performed	Original release date	US viewers (millions)
81	1	Queer Eye	**Karamo Brown** and **Jonathan Van Ness**	"Telephone" by Lady Gaga feat. Beyoncé	January 17, 2019	0.50
81	1	Queer Eye	Bobby Berk, Antoni Porowski, and Tan France	"Work Bitch" by Britney Spears	January 17, 2019	0.50
Special performance: "Grown Woman" by Beyoncé performed by the cast
82	2	Mariah Carey Tribute: **Darren Criss** vs. Jermaine Dupri	Criss	"Heartbreaker"	January 24, 2019	0.54
82	2	Mariah Carey Tribute: **Darren Criss** vs. Jermaine Dupri	Dupri	"Shake It Off"	January 24, 2019	0.54
Special performance: "Emotions" performed by Criss and Dupri. Special appearance by Mariah Carey herself
83	3	**Brooklyn Decker** vs. Andy Roddick	Decker	"Insane in the Brain" by Cypress Hill "Sorry" by Beyoncé	January 31, 2019	0.42
83	3	**Brooklyn Decker** vs. Andy Roddick	Roddick	"Total Eclipse of the Heart" by Bonnie Tyler "Finesse" by Bruno Mars feat. Cardi B	January 31, 2019	0.42
Special appearance by Serena Williams
84	4	**Andy Grammer** vs. Vanessa Morgan	Grammer	"Dangerous Woman" by Ariana Grande "Pump Up the Jam" by Technotronic	February 7, 2019	0.39
84	4	**Andy Grammer** vs. Vanessa Morgan	Morgan	"Let Me Love You" by Mario "Candy Shop" by 50 Cent feat. Olivia	February 7, 2019	0.39
Note: John Legend acts as Chrissy Teigen's interpreter since she lost her voice.
85	5	**Nicole Ari Parker** vs. Boris Kodjoe	Parker	"Tell It to My Heart" by Taylor Dayne "P.I.M.P." by 50 Cent	February 14, 2019	0.42
85	5	**Nicole Ari Parker** vs. Boris Kodjoe	Kodjoe	"Untitled (How Does It Feel)" by D'Angelo "No Excuses" by Meghan Trainor	February 14, 2019	0.42
86	6	**Ben Feldman** vs. Lauren Ash	Feldman	"The Choice is Yours (Revisited)" by Black Sheep "It's All Coming Back to Me Now" by Celine Dion	February 21, 2019	0.45
86	6	**Ben Feldman** vs. Lauren Ash	Ash	"Call Your Girlfriend" by Robyn "Express Yourself" by Madonna	February 21, 2019	0.45
87	7	**Brandon Micheal Hall** vs. Marcus Scribner	Hall	"If It Isn't Love" by New Edition "DNA" by Kendrick Lamar	February 28, 2019	0.41
87	7	**Brandon Micheal Hall** vs. Marcus Scribner	Scribner	"Come & Get It" by Selena Gomez "Perm" by Bruno Mars	February 28, 2019	0.41
Special appearances by Bernard David Jones and Marcel Spears
88	8	**Big Bird (Matt Vogel)** vs. Jason Schwartzman	Big Bird	"Feeling Good" by Michael Bublé "I Gotta Feeling" by The Black Eyed Peas	May 30, 2019	0.43
88	8	**Big Bird (Matt Vogel)** vs. Jason Schwartzman	Schwartzman	"We Didn't Start the Fire" by Billy Joel "Just Like Fire" by P!nk	May 30, 2019	0.43
Special appearances by John Legend, Luna Stephens, Elmo (Ryan Dillon) and Cookie Monster (David Rudman).
89	9	**Nico Tortorella** vs. Molly Bernard	Tortorella	"Where Is the Love?" by The Black Eyed Peas "God Is a Woman" by Ariana Grande	June 6, 2019	0.28
89	9	**Nico Tortorella** vs. Molly Bernard	Bernard	"One Way or Another" by Blondie "Don't Rain on My Parade" by Barbra Streisand	June 6, 2019	0.28
Special appearances by Morgan McMichaels, Jessica Wild, Ongina and Mariah Paris Balenciaga.
90	10	**Matt Iseman** vs. Akbar Gbaja-Biamila	Iseman	"I'd Do Anything for Love (But I Won't Do That)" by Meat Loaf "Believe" by Cher	June 13, 2019	0.35
90	10	**Matt Iseman** vs. Akbar Gbaja-Biamila	Gbaja-Biamila	"On Bended Knee" by Boyz II Men "Bust a Move" by Young MC	June 13, 2019	0.35
91	11	**Dash Mihok** vs. Pooch Hall	Mihok	"There's Nothing Holdin' Me Back" by Shawn Mendes "Problem" by Ariana Grande featuring Iggy Azalea	June 20, 2019	0.37
91	11	**Dash Mihok** vs. Pooch Hall	Hall	"Parents Just Don't Understand" by DJ Jazzy Jeff & The Fresh Prince "Control" by Janet Jackson	June 20, 2019	0.37
92	12	**Prince Royce** vs. Lele Pons	Royce	"Versace on the Floor" by Bruno Mars "Fireball" by Pitbull feat. John Ryan	June 27, 2019	0.41
92	12	**Prince Royce** vs. Lele Pons	Pons	"Ain't Your Mama" by Jennifer Lopez "Gasolina" by Daddy Yankee	June 27, 2019	0.41
93	13	**Serayah** vs. Rotimi	Serayah	"Cool It Now" by New Edition "Work It" by Missy Elliott	June 27, 2019	0.34
93	13	**Serayah** vs. Rotimi	Rotimi	"Nice & Slow" by Usher "Three Little Birds" by Bob Marley and the Wailers	June 27, 2019	0.34
