= Stuart Burton (YouTuber) =

Polish YouTuber of British origin

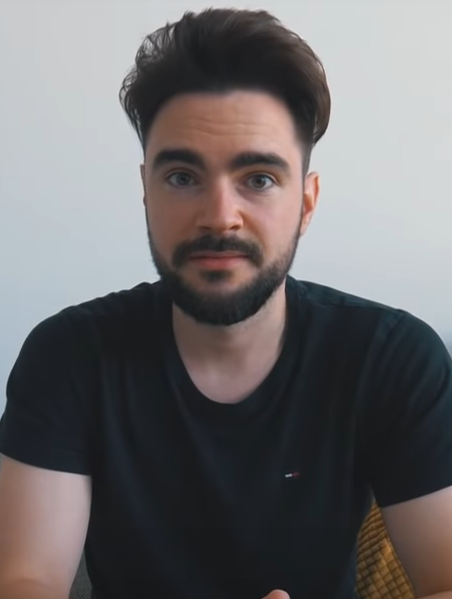
- Stuart Burton (2018)
- Born: 7 January 1992 (age 34); London
- Occupation: YouTuber
- Years active: 2011-2020
- Website: www.youtube.com/user/ThePolishPenguinPL

Stuart Alexander Kluz-Burton (born 7 January 1992) is a British YouTuber based in Poland, creating content mostly in the Polish language under the name Stuu, formerly Polski Pingwin (Polish Penguin).

== Biography ==
He initially published content in the English language, however he stopped due to illness. He returned two years later, creating in Polish as Polski Pingwin. His early content mostly concerned video games, especially Minecraft. He owned a main channel named Stuu, along with three side channels: Stuu PLUS, Stuu Gry (Stuu Games), and Stuu Charytatywnie (Stuu Charity). In 2016, his channel was the fifth most subscribed YouTube channel in Poland. As of May 2024, his main channel has 4.2 million subscribers.

He took part in the Polish dubbing of Sing and The Emoji Movie.

Between 2019 and 2020 he was a part of the Team X project, an influencer collective inspired by the American Team 10. Since 27 May 2020 he stopped being active on social media due to health concerns.

== Controversy ==
On 3 October 2023, Sylwester Wardęga published a YouTube video presenting evidence of Burton meeting up and having sexual conversations with girls below 15 years of age. (The age of consent in Poland is 15.) Wardęga stated that he had informed the authorities at the time of the video's publication. On 13 October 2023 the District Prosecutor's Office in Warsaw filed charges against Burton and made a provisional arrest request to Warsaw District Court. On 14 October 2023 Burton was detained by United Kingdom law enforcement. In late April 2024 an investigative journalism television series Superwizjer released an episode about Burton's case, in relation to a wider sexual grooming scandal in the Polish internet, which has been dubbed Pandora Gate. At the same time, it was revealed that there is an ongoing court case in order to extradite Burton to Poland. The High Court recommended in July 2026, that Burton be extradited to Poland, due to holding a dual citizenship.

In the evening on the 13th August 2026 Burton was extradited to Poland. If convicted, Burton faces a maximum sentence of 12 years in prison.
