= Mutant Giant Spider Dog =

2014 viral YouTube video

Mutant Giant Spider Dog is a YouTube video that went viral with more than 184 million views in 2014. The video was created by Polish YouTuber Sylwester Wardęga. The video features Wardęga's pet dog "Chica" wearing a large spider costume. According to the YouTube blog, "Mutant Giant Spider Dog" was the number one "top trending video" of 2014. As of December 2024, Wardęga's videos have garnered around 800 million views, while his channel has over 3.54 million subscribers.
