= Tiffany Darwish discography =

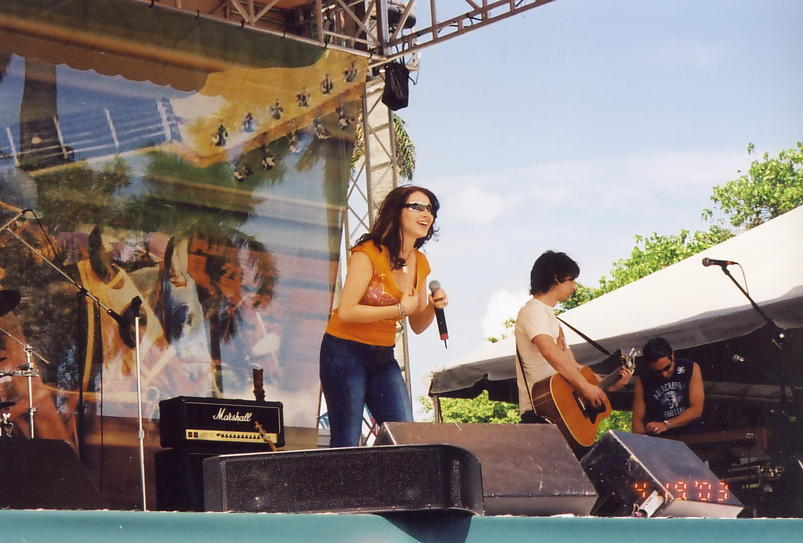
- Studio albums: 11
- Compilation albums: 8
- Singles: 44
- Music videos: 13

This is the discography for American pop singer Tiffany Darwish, known mononymously as Tiffany, who scored five US top 40 hits in the late 1980s, which included "I Think We're Alone Now" and "Could've Been", both of which reached number one on the US Billboard Hot 100.

== Albums ==
=== Studio albums ===
Title	Details	Peak chart positions								Certifications
Title	Details	US	AUS	CAN	JPN	NOR	NZ	SWE	UK	Certifications
Tiffany	Released: June 29, 1987; Label: MCA; Formats: LP, cassette, CD	1	6	1	12	13	1	35	5	RIAA: 4× Platinum; MC: 5× Platinum; BPI: Gold; RIANZ: Platinum
Hold an Old Friend's Hand	Released: November 21, 1988; Label: MCA; Formats: LP, cassette, CD	17	56	14	18	—	48	—	56	RIAA: Platinum; MC: 2× Platinum; BPI: Silver
New Inside	Released: September 25, 1990; Label: MCA; Formats: LP, cassette, CD	—	142	—	17	—	—	—	—	
Dreams Never Die	Released: November 21, 1993; Label: MCA; Formats: LP, cassette, CD	—	—	—	—	—	—	—	—	
The Color of Silence	Released: November 7, 2000; Label: Azil / Eureka; Formats: CD	—	—	—	—	—	—	—	—	
Dust Off and Dance	Released: May 31, 2005; Label: Backroom; Formats: CD	—	—	—	—	—	—	—	—	
Just Me	Released: June 3, 2007; Label: 10 Spot / Water Music; Formats: CD	—	—	—	—	—	—	—	—	
Rose Tattoo	Released: March 1, 2011; Label: Only the Girl Inc. Productions; Formats: CD, digital download	—	—	—	—	—	—	—	—	
A Million Miles	Released: May 27, 2016; Label: Formats: CD, digital download	—	—	—	—	—	—	—	—	
Pieces of Me	Released: September 21, 2018; Label: Go On Then; Formats: LP, CD, digital download	—	—	—	—	—	—	—	—	
Shadows	Released: November 25, 2022; Label: Deko Entertainment; Formats: LP, CD, digital download	—	—	—	—	—	—	—	—	
"—" denotes a recording that did not chart or was not released in that territory.

=== Compilation albums ===
Title	Details
Best 16	Hits compilation (Japan only); Released: November 26, 1992; Label: MCA Victor
Best of Best	Hits compilation (Japan only); Released: October 26, 1994; Label: MCA Victor
Best One	Hits compilation (Japan only); Released: October 27, 1995; Label: MCA Victor
All the Best	Hits compilation with 2 new songs (Asia only); Released: February 21, 1996; Label: MCA
Greatest Hits	Hits compilation; Released: October 22, 1996; Label: Hip-O
I Think We're Alone Now: '80s Hits and More	Re-recordings of 1980s hits; Released: May 3, 2007; Label: Cleopatra
Mimi's Kitchen	Compilation of older unreleased music; Released: 2008; Label: Self-released
Greatest Hits of the '80s and Beyond	Released: May 31, 2011; Label: Cleopatra; Formats: CD, digital download

== Extended plays ==
Title	Details	Peak chart positions
Title	Details	JPN
I Saw Him Standing There	Released: May 11, 1988; Label: MCA/Warner Music Japan	15

== Singles ==
List of singles, with selected chart positions and certifications, showing year released and album name
Year	Title	Peak chart positions								Certifications	Album
Year	Title	US	US AC	US Dance	AUS	NLD	UK	CAN	NZ	Certifications	Album
1987	"Danny"	—	—	—	—	—	—	—	—		Tiffany
1987	"I Think We're Alone Now"	1	38	26	13	2	1	1	1	MC: Gold; BPI: 2× Platinum; RIAA: Platinum; RMNZ: Platinum	Tiffany
1987	"Could've Been"	1	1	—	8	25	4	1	5	MC: Gold	Tiffany
1988	"I Saw Him Standing There"	7	—	—	10	—	8	4	3		Tiffany
1988	"Feelings of Forever"	50	43	—	—	—	52	41	—		Tiffany
1988	"All This Time"	6	10	—	120	—	47	4	—		Hold an Old Friend's Hand
1988	"Radio Romance"	35	—	—	65	53	13	—	16		Hold an Old Friend's Hand
1989	"Hold an Old Friend's Hand"	—	37	—	161	—	—	—	—		Hold an Old Friend's Hand
1989	"It's the Lover (Not the Love)"	—	—	—	—	—	—	—	—		Hold an Old Friend's Hand
1989	"Oh Jackie" ^{1}	—	—	—	—	—	—	—	—		Hold an Old Friend's Hand
1990	"I Always Thought I'd See You Again"	—	—	—	—	—	—	—	—		Jetsons: The Movie - Original Motion Picture Soundtrack
1990	"New Inside"	—	—	—	159	—	—	—	—		New Inside
1990	"Here in My Heart"	—	—	—	—	—	—	—	—		New Inside
1991	"Back in the Groove" ^{1}	—	—	—	—	—	—	—	—		New Inside
1991	"Voices That Care" (among various artists)	11	6	—	—	—	—	—	—		Non-album single
1993	"If Love Is Blind" ^{1}	—	—	—	—	—	—	—	—		Dreams Never Die
1994	"Can't You See" ^{1}	—	—	—	—	—	—	—	—		Dreams Never Die
2000	"I'm Not Sleeping"	—	—	—	—	—	—	—	—		The Color of Silence
2000	"Open My Eyes"	—	—	—	—	—	—	—	—		The Color of Silence
2005	"Be With U Tonite"	—	—	—	—	—	—	—	—		Dust Off And Dance
2006	"Na Na Na"	—	—	—	—	—	—	—	—		Dust Off And Dance
2006	"Ride It"	—	—	—	—	—	—	—	—		Dust Off And Dance
2006	"Fly"	—	—	—	—	—	—	—	—		Dust Off And Dance
2007	"Feels Like Love"	—	—	—	—	—	—	—	—		Just Me
2007	"Higher"	—	—	19	—	—	—	—	—		Non-album singles
2008	"Just Another Day"	—	—	28	—	—	—	—	—		Non-album singles
2009	"Dust Off and Dance" (Hydra Productions featuring Tiffany)	—	—	19	—	—	—	—	—		Hydra Productions: Liquid
2010	"We Got the Beat"	—	—	—	—	—	—	—	—		Greatest Hits of the '80s and Beyond
2010	"Running Up That Hill"	—	—	—	—	—	—	—	—		Greatest Hits of the '80s and Beyond
2010	"Livin' on a Prayer"	—	—	—	—	—	—	—	—		Greatest Hits of the '80s and Beyond
2010	"Toca's Miracle"	—	—	—	—	—	—	—	—		Greatest Hits of the '80s and Beyond
2010	"Silent Night"	—	—	—	—	—	—	—	—		Non-album single
2011	"Love Is a Battlefield"	—	—	—	—	—	—	—	—		Greatest Hits of the '80s and Beyond
2011	"Hold Me Now"	—	—	—	—	—	—	—	—		Greatest Hits of the '80s and Beyond
2011	"Serpentine"	—	—	—	—	—	—	—	—		Mega Python VS. Gatoroid Movie
2011	"Feel the Music"	—	—	—	—	—	—	—	—		Rose Tattoo
2016	"Right Here"	—	—	—	—	—	—	—	—		A Million Miles
2017	"Can't Stop Falling"	—	—	—	—	—	—	—	—		Non-album single
2018	"Worlds Away"	—	—	—	—	—	—	—	—		Pieces Of Me
2019	"Waste of Time"	—	—	—	—	—	—	—	—		Pieces Of Me
2019	"I Think We're Alone Now" (2019 Re-recording)	—	—	—	—	—	—	—	—		Non-album single
2020	"Angels"	—	—	—	—	—	—	—	—		Non-album single
2021	"Hey Baby"	—	—	—	—	—	—	—	—		Shadows
2022	"I Like the Rain"	—	—	—	—	—	—	—	—		Shadows
2022	"You're My Everything"	—	—	—	—	—	—	—	—		Shadows

Footnotes

- ^{1} Released in Asia only.

== Music videos ==
Year	Video	Director	Notes
1987	"I Think We're Alone Now"	George Tobin	Single version
1987	"Could've Been"		Extended version
1987	"I Saw Him Standing There"		Single version
1987	"Feelings of Forever"		Single version
1988	"All This Time"	George Tobin	Extended version
1988	"Radio Romance"		Single version
1990	"Here in My Heart"	Doug Nichol	Album version
1993	"If Love Is Blind"		Single version
1993	"Can't You See"		Album version
2001	"Open My Eyes"		Single version
2001	"Christening"		Album version
2007	"Feels Like Love"	Michael Stratigakis	Album version
2019	"I Think We're Alone Now"	Marc Trojanowski	2019 version
2019	"Beautiful"		Album version
