= Greatest Hits (Tiffany album) =

Greatest hits album by Tiffany
- Released: October 22, 1996
- Recorded: 1987–1990
- Genres: Teen pop; pop rock
- Length: 51:04
- Label: Hip-O
- Producers: George Tobin; Maurice Starr; Phillip Damien

Tiffany chronology
Dreams Never Die (1993)	Greatest Hits (1996)	The Color of Silence (2000)

Greatest Hits is a compilation album by American former teen idol singer Tiffany. The compilation features all of her singles from her first three albums Tiffany (1987), Hold an Old Friend's Hand (1988), and New Inside (1990) except "Oh Jackie" and "New Inside". It was released on October 22, 1996, via Hip-O Records and distributed through Tiffany's former label, MCA Records. Although no new material was recorded, the track "Mr. Mambo" was included after it previously appeared exclusively as a B-side to "I Saw Him Standing There". In the United States, it was the first official new Tiffany release since New Inside as her 1993 album Dreams Never Die was not released in the country.

== Content ==
Greatest Hits consists of 12 tracks. All singles from her self-titled debut album made the cut, including the obscure lead single "Danny", which contrary to popular belief is actually Tiffany's debut single and not her cover of Tommy James and the Shondells's "I Think We're Alone Now". All singles from her second album Hold an Old Friend's Hand are included, minus the 1989 Japan-exclusive single "Oh Jackie". New Inside includes two songs but the title track is not included on the album. The one track not previously included on an album is "Mr. Mambo", previously included as a B-side to her cover of the Beatles's "I Saw Her Standing There".

== Track listing ==
Greatest Hits track listing
No.	Title	Writer(s)	Original album	Length
1.	"I Think We're Alone Now"	Ritchie Cordell	Tiffany	3:50
2.	"Danny" (Single Version)	Jody Moreing	Tiffany	4:02
3.	"All This Time"	Tim James; Steven McClintock	Hold an Old Friend's Hand	4:23
4.	"It's the Lover (Not the Love)"	Rich Donahue; Patrick Dollaghan	Hold an Old Friend's Hand	4:11
5.	"I Saw Him Standing There" (Single Version)	Lennon–McCartney	Tiffany	4:12
6.	"Hold an Old Friend's Hand"	Donna Weiss	Hold an Old Friend's Hand	4:27
7.	"Radio Romance"	John Duarte; Mark Paul	Hold an Old Friend's Hand	4:07
8.	"Feelings of Forever"	Paul; Duarte	Tiffany	3:53
9.	"Back in the Groove"	Tiffany; Maurice Starr	New Inside	4:37
10.	"Mr. Mambo"	Duarte; Paul	B-side to "I Saw Him Standing There"	5:47
11.	"Here in My Heart"	Diane Warren	New Inside	4:10
12.	"Could've Been"	Lois Blaisch	Tiffany	3:34
Total length:				51:19

== Critical reception ==
Greatest Hits received mixed reviews. Stephen Thomas Erlewine of AllMusic gave a mixed review of the compilation, saying that although it sounded dated it was fine for "anyone wanting a collection of all of her finest moments." Entertainment Weekly was a bit more positive in their review, saying that "although Tiffany’s music digressed into adult-ballad careerism, this set mainly proves how unrestrained her sonic youth sounded."
