= Higher (Tiffany song) =

Single by Tiffany
- Released: 2007
- Genre: Electronic; dance music
- Length: 3:53 (Josh Harris radio mix)
- Label: Dauman Music
- Songwriter(s): Tiffany; Margie Hauser; Jay Condiotti
- Producer(s): Jason Dauman; Margie Hauser; (executive producers)

Tiffany singles chronology
"Feels Like Love" (2007)	"Higher" (2007)	"Just Another Day" (2008)

"Higher" is a song by American pop artist and former teen idol Tiffany. The song was written by Tiffany, Margie Hauser, and Jay Condiotti, with Hauser and Jason Dauman being executive producers. It was released in 2007 via Dauman Music as a standalone single. It was promoted with remixes by Josh Harris, Matt Johnson, and JJ Sanchez. The track became a moderate dance hit upon its release.

== Chart performance ==
"Higher" debuted onto the US Billboard Hot Dance Club Play chart the week of October 13, 2007 at number 45. It became Tiffany's first appearance on a Billboard chart in 18 years; June 24, 1989 was when her second studio album Hold an Old Friend's Hand (1988) and its title track spent their final week on the Billboard 200 and Adult Contemporary charts. It was also her second entry on the chart following "I Think We're Alone Now". It spent 12 weeks on the chart, peaking at number 19.

== Charts ==
Chart (2007)	Peak position
US Dance Club Songs (Billboard)	19
