= I Think We're Alone Now (disambiguation) =

"I Think We're Alone Now" is a 1967 song originally recorded by Tommy James and the Shondells and covered by Tiffany.

I Think We're Alone Now may also refer to:

- I Think We're Alone Now (album), a 1967 album by Tommy James and the Shondells
- I Think We're Alone Now: '80s Hits and More, a 2007 compilation album by Tiffany
- I Think We're Alone Now, a 2008 documentary about two obsessed Tiffany fans
- I Think We're Alone Now (film), a 2018 post-apocalyptic film
