= Oh Jackie =

Single by Tiffany

from the album Hold an Old Friend's Hand
- B-side: "I'll Be The Girl"
- Released: May 1989
- Recorded: 1988
- Genre: Funk rock; pop rock
- Length: 4:14
- Label: MCA Records
- Songwriter(s): Tim James, Steven McClintock, Tim Heintz, Kimberly Feldman
- Producer(s): George Tobin

Tiffany singles chronology
"It's the Lover (Not the Love)" (1989)	"Oh Jackie" (1989)	"New Inside" (1990)

"Oh Jackie" by Tiffany from her second album Hold an Old Friend's Hand was only released in Japan in May 1989. At the same time Yamaha launched a full-scale media campaign featuring Tiffany and this song in order to promote their new line of stereo systems, named after her (the "Tiffany System Stereo" - as marked on this single cover) which pioneered "Active Servo Technology".

Other territories received the singles "Hold an Old Friend's Hand" and "It's the Lover (Not the Love)" within a similar time period, but neither performed well due to declining popularity in the west.

== Track listings and formats ==
7" single and 3" CD single

1. "Oh Jackie"
2. "I'll Be the Girl"
