= Hold an Old Friend's Hand =

Studio album by Tiffany
- Released: November 21, 1988
- Recorded: August–October 1988
- Studio: Roxx Studios (North Hollywood, California)
- Genre: Teen pop; bubblegum pop
- Length: 43:28
- Label: MCA
- Producer: George Tobin

Tiffany chronology
Tiffany (1987)	Hold an Old Friend's Hand (1988)	New Inside (1990)

Singles from Hold an Old Friend's Hand
- 1. "All This Time" Released: October 24, 1988; 2. "Radio Romance" Released: October 31, 1988; 3. "Oh Jackie" Released: 1989; 4. "Hold an Old Friend's Hand" Released: April 21, 1989; 5. "It's the Lover (Not the Love)" Released: July 1989

Hold an Old Friend's Hand is the second studio album by American singer Tiffany, released on November 21, 1988, by MCA Records. It was produced by George Tobin, who previously worked with Tiffany on her self-titled debut album. Hold an Old Friend's Hand is a teen pop and bubblegum pop album that explores the themes of young adulthood. Musically, the album incorporates elements of pop, rock, funk, disco, dance, and country pop.

The album received mixed reviews by critics. Some critics praised the album as well-crafted and an improvement to her self-titled debut album, while others criticized the calculated production. In the US, the album failed to replicate the success of her previous album, peaking at No. 17 on Billboard's Top Pop Albums chart. The first single of the album, "All This Time", peaked at No. 6 on Billboard Hot 100, becoming her fourth and final top-ten single on the chart. "Radio Romance" achieved success in the UK, peaking at No. 13 on the UK Single Charts.

== Background ==
In April 1986, Tiffany signed a contract with MCA Records at the age of 14. Her self-titled album was recorded in North Hollywood, California, and production for the album lasted ten months. Released on June 29, 1987, Tiffany became a teen pop icon. Her self-titled album peaked at No. 1 on Billboard's Top Pop Albums chart during the week of January 23, 1988, and remained for two weeks. At the age of 16 years, Tiffany became the youngest female artist to achieve a No. 1 album and the first female solo and third artist to have an album chart on the chart under the age of 18 years. Her second single, "I Think We're Alone Now", was a success, peaking at No. 1 on Billboard Hot 100 during the week of November 7, 1987, and remaining for two weeks. Her third single, "Could've Been", made Tiffany the youngest artist to have two No. 1 consecutive singles.

Tiffany embarked a shopping mall tour called The Beautiful You: Celebrating the Good Life Shopping Mall Tour '87, which included 60 concerts. She triggered hundreds of sales of her self-titled album for each performance by the end of the tour, including over 600 units during some weekends.

== Production ==
The album was recorded and mixed digitally between August and October 1988 on a Trident DI-AN console at Roxx Studios in North Hollywood, California. It was going to originally include Tiffany's cover of The Rascals' "I Ain't Gonna Eat Out My Heart Anymore", but was later removed for unknown reasons. Her cover was later included in the 2005 re-release of her fourth album Dreams Never Die.

== Music and lyrics ==
Like her self-titled debut album, Hold an Old Friend's Hand is a teen pop album that consists the themes of teenage girls' fantasies. The album is also a collection of bubblegum pop with a "(slightly) more mature" sound. The album explores genres of pop, rock, dance, disco, funk, and country pop. According to music critic Jim Zebora, the album is a "collection of ballads and romantic pop songs, occasionally with a hint of jazz in the background." The Tribune review also stated that the album has a "split between catchy dance songs and bubblegum ballads." Most of the songs incorporate a "heavy dose" of Simmons drums, mid-tempo beats, "swirling" synths, a heavy metal guitar, and echoes.

Lyrically, the album included more "grown-up" songs, exploring the "perils of young adulthood." Recurring themes of the album include adolescent angst, love, heartbreak, joy, and friendship. Dennis Hunt of Los Angeles Times described the songs as "full of adolescent yearning". Like her self-titled debut album, Tiffany's vocal style was influenced by Stevie Nicks. However, according to John Milward of Knight-Ridder, the "more sophisticating" styling of her new music "makes her sound even more like Stevie Nicks." The songs shift from ballads ("All This Time", "It's the Lover (Not the Love)") to clunkers ("Oh Jackie", "Drop That Bomb").

The album's opening track, "All This Time", is a ballad that "elicits with sympathy." "Oh Jackie" is lyrically about heartbreak. Musically, it includes a funk rock and pop rock arrangement. The title-track is a rearranged version of the original country version. A "softly propulsive", "California-rock" ballad, it lyrically tells a girl rekindling a love gone bad and asking for a moment with an old friend. Musically, it incorporates Tiffany's "country-flavored" vocals and an electronic treatment. According to John Milward of Knight-Ridder, the music production was reminiscent of the Eagles and defines Tiffany's new sound. Bill Henderson of The Orlando Sentinel described her vocals in the song as "raspy [...] and almost as potent."

"Radio Romance"
"Radio Romance" is an up tempo hi-NRG song that explores disco and doo-wop music, and incorporates an "early '60s sound" and a "Phil Spector[-ish] girl group aura".

"Radio Romance" is an up-tempo hi-NRG song that explores disco and doo-wop music, and lyrically describes a girl getting a request for her "secret love out in [the] radio-land." The music production incorporates an "early '60s sound" and a "Phil Spector[-ish] girl group aura" with drum machines. European magazine Music & Media commented that the song resembled Spector's "Be My Baby". "We're Both Thinking of Her" explores funk rock and dance-pop music, and lyrically speaks of a girl having fun despite a guilty conscience. Barry Walters of The San Francisco Examiner was questionable of whether the song has an allusion to a bisexual love triangle.

In the pop-oriented track "Walk Away While You Can", Tiffany sings with a Tina Turner-inspired "gritty delivery and confident stance." Helen Metella of Edmonton Journal stated that the song was reminiscent of the discography of Fleetwood Mac. "Drop That Bomb" explores dance-pop music and borrows riffs from Deniece Williams' "Let's Hear It For the Boy", the Pointer Sisters' "He's So Shy", and the Four Seasons' "December 1963 (Oh What A Night)". Robert Sheffield of Spin commented that the song begins with the percussion of Debbie Gibson's "Only In My Dreams", "and continues into a strong vocal and lyrical" similarity to Gibson's "Play the Field". "It's the Lover (Not the Love)" is a slow ballad. "I'll Be the Girl" is a disco and funk rock song that lyrically speaks of joy. John Milward of Knight-Ridder stated that Tiffany's vocals "sound like [a] soft-core Madonna." "Hearts Never Lie" is a love ballad that features country singer Chris Farren. The album's final track, "Overture", is an acoustic guitar instrumental performance by Grant Geissman.

== Release ==
Hold an Old Friend's Hand was originally scheduled to be released on October 24 and November 7, 1988. It was released on November 21, 1988, by MCA Records.

=== Singles ===
The first single, "All This Time", was released on October 24, 1988, to contemporary hit radio in the United States. The song was heard five days earlier within the season premiere of the TV sitcom Growing Pains. The song was later released on January 30, 1989, as the second single in the United Kingdom. It received moderate success, peaking at number 6 on Billboard Hot 100 and No. 10 on Billboard's Adult Contemporary Chart. It was her fourth and last top-ten single in the US. Internationally, the song hit the Top 10 in Canada and Ecuador. The second single, "Radio Romance", was released on October 31, 1988, in the United Kingdom and in February 1989 in the United States. In the United Kingdom and Australia, "Radio Romance" was served as the first single of the album. The single received minor success in the United States, peaking at the Top 40 on Billboard Hot 100. It was her final solo single to appear on the chart. The single also achieved moderate success in the United Kingdom, peaking at No. 13 on the UK Singles Chart.

The third single, "Hold an Old Friend's Hand", was released on April 21, 1989, exclusively released only to the United States, Australia, and Japan. The single received very minor success in the US and Australia, peaking at number 37 on Billboard's Adult Contemporary Chart and number 161 on the ARIA Singles Charts. It was Tiffany's last solo single to enter any Billboard charts until 2007. In Japan, "Oh Jackie" was released in 1989. In the United States, "It's the Lover (Not the Love)" was released as the fourth and final single of the album in July 1989. Despite receiving minor airplay, the single completely failed to enter any Billboard charts.

== Commercial performance ==
In the US, Hold an Old Friend's Hand received moderate success, peaking at No. 17 on the week of January 21, 1989. The album charted at the top-twenty in Canada and Japan. The album was certified platinum by the Recording Industry Association of America (RIAA) on January 20, 1989. In Canada, it was certified 2× Platinum for shipping over 200,000 copies. In the United Kingdom, it was certified Silver by the British Phonographic Industry for shipping over 60,000 copies.

== Critical reception ==
Professional ratings
Review scores
Source	Rating
AllMusic	3/5 stars
Robert Christgau	B−
Number One	3/5 stars
The Orlando Sentinel	3/5 stars
The Record	2.5/5 stars
Record Mirror	3/5 medals
Rolling Stone	1/5 stars

Upon its release, Hold an Old Friend's Hand received mixed reviews from critics. Some critics reviewed the album's production as enjoyable and an improvement to her self-titled debut album. Dennis Hunt of Los Angeles Times was enthused about the album, describing it as an improvement to her self-titled debut album. He also described the songs as "more keenly", and "All This Time" and "It's the Love (Not the Lover)" as "some of the year's prettiest melodies". Bill Henderson of the Orlando Sentinel gave the album three out of five stars, describing the album as "enjoyable". Henderson praised the production of "All This Time" as "clever without being overwrought" and chose "Radio Romance" as the best song on the album. Music critic Robert Christgau gave the album a "B−", stating that "Maturity doesn't become her--exchanging schlock-rock remakes for still more Hollywood readymades, she's hellbent for biz divahood and may well get there." Barbara Jaeger of The Record gave the album two-and-a-half out of five stars. Jaeger called the music "simplistic" and the sentiments "sappy", but praised the album as a "well-crafted, well-produced 10-song collection".

Other critics criticized the calculated production. Ron Sylvester of The Springfield News-Leader gave the album two out of six strings, stating that Tiffany continues to suffer from the "lack of originality". He chose "Radio Romance", "Drop the Bomb", and "It's the Lover (Not the Love)" as highlights, describing the latter as a "hint of gaining maturity as a singer." Helen Metella of Edmonton Journal criticized the album as "poorly served", but praised her vocals as "fabulously flexible". Ken Tucker of The Philadelphia Inquirer criticized the album as "even more scattershot and uneven than her debut" and described "Radio Romance" as "sweetly silly". Music critic Deborah Wilker described the album as a "perfect example everything that went wrong with pop music in the '80s." Wilker criticized the "bland, meaningless songs" and "cliche arrangements", and concluded that the album is a "waste". Music critic Jim Zebora rated the album a "D", describing the album as one of the "safest, least demanding album [he] has ever been bored by." Michael Anft of The Evening Sun criticized the calculated production, including the "weak" songwriting. Jimmy Guterman of Rolling Stone gave this album one out of five stars, stating that the record is "full of the same brand of synthesizer-heavy teen pop, with all hands trying to fill in the massive holes left by the Tiff's weak warble." Music critic Cliff Radel also gave the album one out of five stars, lamenting the album as "awful" and her vocal tone as "raspy and slurred".

In a retrospective review, Bryan Buss of AllMusic stated that the album is a "stronger, more complete package than the first". Although he praised "We're Both Thinking of Her", "Walk Away While You Can", and "Drop That Bomb" for being "perfect pop-jingles", he criticized "It's the Lover (Not the Love)" for "[sounding] like she's shouting" and "I'll Be the Girl" for being "somewhat grating", though, he also praised them for being "undeniably catchy".

== Track listing ==
Hold an Old Friend's Hand track listing
No.	Title	Writer(s)	Length
1.	"All This Time"	Tim James; Steven McClintock	4:20
2.	"Oh Jackie"	T. James; McClintock; Tim Heintz; Kimberly Feldman	4:14
3.	"Hold an Old Friend's Hand"	Donna Weiss	4:24
4.	"Radio Romance"	John Duarte; Mark Paul	4:04
5.	"We're Both Thinking of Her"	George Tobin; Mark Keefner	3:40
6.	"Walk Away While You Can"	Mike Piccirillo	4:04
7.	"Drop That Bomb"	Duarte; Bill Bowersock	3:44
8.	"It's the Lover (Not the Love)"	Rich Donahue; Patrick Dollaghan	4:08
9.	"I'll Be the Girl"	Tobin; Piccirillo	4:27
10.	"Hearts Never Lie"	Allan Roy Scott; Hugh James	4:59
11.	"Overture"	T. James; McClintock; Scott; H. James; Weiss	1:24
Total length:			43:28

== Personnel ==
Personnel as listed in the album's liner notes:

- Tiffany – vocals, backing vocals (2, 3, 5–10)
- John Duarte – keyboards (1–5, 7, 8), drum programming (1–5, 7, 8), arrangements (1–5, 7, 8, 10), keyboard solo (7), additional keyboards (9, 10)
- Mike Piccirillo – keyboards (6, 9), guitars (6), guitar solo (6), drum programming (6, 9), arrangements (6, 9), backing vocals (9)
- Hugh James – acoustic piano (10), Yamaha DX7 (10)
- Michael Thompson – guitars (1–3, 5, 9), guitar solo (1, 2, 5, 9)
- Grant Geissman – guitars (8, 10), guitar solo (10), acoustic guitar (11)
- Henry Newmark – Simmons toms (7)
- Richard Elliot – saxophone solo (3, 4), saxophone (8)
- Stuart Levin – strings (7)
- Steve McClintock – backing vocals (2)
- Julia Waters – backing vocals (4)
- Maxine Waters – backing vocals (4)
- Terry Wood – backing vocals (5, 9)
- Chris Farren – lead vocals (10)
- Tommy Funderburk – backing vocals (10)

=== Production ===
- George Tobin – producer, management
- Bill Smith – engineer, mixing (1–4, 6–11)
- John Kliner – mixing (5), additional engineer (6, 8–10)
- Michael Mikulka – additional engineer (5)
- John Kerns – additional engineer (10)
- Howard Lee Wolen – additional engineer (10)
- Bill Womack – chief technical advisor
- Brenda Farrell – production coordinator
- Carole Kliner – production coordinator
- Lisa LeFever – production coordinator
- Jeanne Bradshaw – art direction, design
- Herb Ritts – photography
- Sharon Simonaire – stylist
- Sally Herschberger – hair stylist
- Kathy Jeung – make-up

== Charts ==
=== Weekly charts ===
Chart (1988)	Peak position
Australian Albums (ARIA)	56
Canada Top Albums/CDs (RPM)	14
Japanese Albums (Oricon)	18
New Zealand Albums (RMNZ)	48
UK Albums (OCC)	56
US Billboard 200	17

=== Year-end charts ===
Chart (1989)	Position
US Billboard 200	48

== Certifications and sales ==
Region	Certification	Certified units/sales
Canada (Music Canada)	2× Platinum	200,000^{^}
Hong Kong (IFPI Hong Kong)	Gold	10,000^{*}
United Kingdom (BPI)	Silver	60,000^{^}
United States (RIAA)	Platinum	1,000,000^{^}
^{*} Sales figures based on certification alone.^{^} Shipments figures based on certification alone.
