= Dreams Never Die =

Studio album by Tiffany
- Released: November 1993
- Genre: Pop
- Length: 52:16
- Label: MCA Records
- Producer: George Tobin; John Duarte

Tiffany chronology
New Inside (1990)	Dreams Never Die (1993)	Greatest Hits (1996)

Singles from Dreams Never Die
- 1. "If Love Is Blind" Released: January 1994

Professional ratings
Review scores
Source	Rating
Allmusic	3/5 stars

Dreams Never Die is the fourth studio album by American singer and former teen idol Tiffany. It was released officially on November 1993 via MCA Records and was her final release with the label. The album was exclusively released in Asian markets as a US release was shelved. The American release was expected to have had more of a "soft rock" in comparison to the pop of the original version. Tiffany reunited with George Tobin for production of the album despite worries from friends and family. Their relationship would once again end when Tiffany found out the "new" songs that Tobin had been giving her had already been recorded by another one of his acts, PC Quest.

To promote the album, Tiffany announced a series of shows at the Westgate Las Vegas lounge, of which its setlist included some songs from the album. She followed it up with a six-week tour throughout East and Southeast Asia. "If Love Is Blind" was released in January 1994 in Asia. It was commercially released in Japan and Australia. It peaked at number-one on a Hong Kong radio station.

In September 2005, the album was re-released by Tobin through CD Baby. The edition included unreleased songs by Tiffany that were recorded during the productions of Tiffany and Hold an Old Friend's Hand.

Dreams Never Die sold 100,000 units in Asia, including 20,000 in Taiwan and 30,000 in Indonesia.

== Track listing ==
Standard edition
No.	Title	Writer(s)	Length
1.	"If Love Is Blind"	Tim James; Steven McClintock	3:42
2.	"Kiss You All Over"	Mike Chapman; Nicky Chinn	4:40
3.	"Can't You See"	Monte Brinkley; John Duarte; James; McClintock	3:45
4.	"Kiss the Ground"	Ronan O'Hanlon	4:07
5.	"Dreams Never Die""	Duarte; Mark Paul	4:54
6.	"That One Blue Candle"	Danny O'Keefe; Vince Melamed	4:14
7.	"Almost in Love""	James; Mike Piccirillo	4:34
8.	"Ruthless"	Duarte; Donna Weiss	4:43
9.	"These Arms of Mine"	Otis Redding	4:20
10.	"Sam Loves Joann"	Tia Sillers; John Tirro	4:14
11.	"We're the Truth"	James; McClintock	3:52
12.	"Loneliness"	Harold Beaty	5:11
Total length:			52:16

2005 re-release
No.	Title	Writer(s)	Length
13.	"You Can't Break a Broken Heart"	Duarte; Paul	4:35
14.	"Lookin' Through the Windows"	Duarte; Paul	3:55
15.	"Are You Lonely Tonight"	Duarte; Paul	4:22
16.	"I Don't Know What You Got"	Duarte; Paul	4:30
17.	"I Ain't Gonna Eat Out My Heart Anymore"	Lori Burton; Pamela Sawyer	4:02
18.	"Angel Baby"	Rosie Hamlin	4:22
Total length:			78:22

== Personnel ==
Taken from the Dreams Never Die booklet.

- John Duarte – keyboards
- Bret Zwier – drums
- Grant Geissman – guitar
- Kevin Dukes – guitar
- Keith Howland – guitar
- Monty Byrom – guitar
- Doug Livingston – steel guitar
- Drew Nichols – acoustic guitar
- Tiffany, Aaron Sheppard, Brian Sheppard, Kevin Sheppard, Terry Wood, Chad Petree, Steve Petree – backing vocals
