= Rose Tattoo (disambiguation) =

Rose Tattoo is an Australian rock group formed in 1976. Rose Tattoo may also refer to:

== Music ==
- Rose Tattoo (Rose Tattoo album), a 1978 album by Rose Tattoo
- Rose Tattoo (Tiffany album), a 2011 album by Tiffany
- The Rose Tattoo (album), a 1983 album by Freddie Hubbard
- "Rose Tattoo" (song), a song by Dropkick Murphys from their 2013 album Signed and Sealed in Blood
- "The Rose Tattoo", a song by David Byrne and Willie Colón on Byrne's 1989 album Rei Momo

== Other uses ==
- The Rose Tattoo, a 1951 play by Tennessee Williams
- The Rose Tattoo (film), a 1955 movie based upon the Tennessee Williams play
- Rose Tattoo (comics), a character in Wildstorm Comics first appearing in 1996
- "Rose Tattoo" (After You've Gone), a 2007 television episode
