= Just Me (Tiffany album) =

Studio album by Tiffany
- Released: June 5, 2007
- Genre: Pop
- Label: 10 Spot Records

Tiffany chronology
I Think We're Alone Now: '80s Hits and More (2007)	Just Me (2007)	Rose Tattoo (2011)

Singles from Just Me
- 1. "Feels Like Love"

Just Me (stylized in lower case) is the seventh studio album by Tiffany, released in 2007. Fresh off Celebrity Fit Club, former 1980s pop sensation Tiffany released her first album of all original music since 2005's Dust Off and Dance. The first single and music video was "Feels Like Love". The video for "Feels Like Love" was officially released on YouTube by Tiffany's now-defunct record company 10 Spot Records. On the day of the album's release, Tiffany played a free show at the Virgin Megastore Sunset in Los Angeles, California.

== Track listing ==
1. "Feels Like Love" (Tiffany, Charlie Colin, Gregory Butler, Jennifer Crowe)
2. "Just Me" (Tiffany, Robert Tarango, Gene Reeves)
3. "Be Alright" (Tiffany, Robert Tarango, Gene Reeves, Michelle Ann Owens)
4. "Hiding Behind the Face" (Tiffany, Tim Feehan, Gene Black)
5. "Calling Out Your Name" (Tiffany, Gregory Butler, Ryan Kirk)
6. "Mind Candy" (Gregory Butler, Jaime Wyatt)
7. "Anyone but Me" (Charlie Colin, Gregory Butler, Jennifer Crowe)
8. "Streets of Gold" (Tommy Wright)
9. "This Love" (Tiffany, Gregory Butler, Ryan Kirk)
10. "Winter's Over" (Tiffany, Loren Gold, Colette Rounsvall)
11. "I Will Not Breakdown" (Bonus Track) (Tim Feehan, Gene Black, Steven Joe Brooks; previously on 2000's The Color of Silence)
