= Radio Romance (song) =

- International cover

Single by Tiffany

from the album Hold an Old Friend's Hand
- B-side: "I'll Be the Girl"; "Gotta Be Love"; "Can't Stop a Heartbeat"
- Released: October 31, 1988
- Genre: Teen pop; bubblegum pop; hi-NRG; disco
- Length: 4:04
- Label: MCA
- Songwriters: John Duarte; Mark Paul
- Producer: George Tobin

Tiffany singles chronology
"All This Time" (1988)	"Radio Romance" (1988)	"Hold an Old Friend's Hand" (1989)

Alternative cover
- US commercial cassette single

"Radio Romance" is a song by American recording artist Tiffany, recorded for her second studio album Hold an Old Friend's Hand (1988). The track was written by John Duarte and Mark Paul and produced by her manager George Tobin. A teen pop song, it was first released on October 31, 1988, in the United Kingdom as the lead single from the album. In the United States, the song was released to radio in February 1989 as the second single from the album following "All This Time".

The track was a moderate success, peaking at number 13 on the UK Singles Chart and number 35 on the US Billboard Hot 100. To promote the track in America, Tiffany performed it on the Mickey Mouse Club and The Arsenio Hall Show.

== Critical reception ==
Pan-European magazine Music & Media said the song resembled Spector's "Be My Baby". Billboard gave the song a negative review saying, "Inexcusably boring and one-dimensional hi-NRG from an artist who should be utilizing her popularity by trying material a bit more challenging. One sugar too many." While reviewing the album, RPM said the song would please disco listeners.

== Music video ==
The music video for "Radio Romance" shows Tiffany as a waitress in a diner who calls the radio request line often to request a song for her secret crush. The problem is that he is holding hands with her best friend. Later in the video, Tiffany dances with others in what looks like a dream sequence. As the video progresses, a child appears with a magic wand.

== Track listings ==
European and Australian 7-inch single

1. "Radio Romance" – 4:01
2. "Can't Stop a Heartbeat" – 4:45

Japanese 7-inch and mini-CD single

1. "Radio Romance" – 4:03
2. "Gotta Be Love" – 4:19

UK and German mini-CD single

1. "Radio Romance" (7" version) – 4:01
2. "Can't Stop a Heartbeat" – 4:45
3. "Radio Romance" (dance mix/12" version) – 6:56

US and Canadian 7-inch and cassette single

1. "Radio Romance" – 4:04
2. "I'll Be the Girl" – 4:26

== Personnel ==
Taken from the Hold an Old Friend's Hand booklet.

- John Duarte – keyboards, drum programming, arrangement
- Richard Elliot – sax and solo
- Julia Waters and Maxine Waters – background vocals

== Charts ==
=== Weekly charts ===
Weekly chart performance for "Radio Romance"
Chart (1988–1989)	Peak position
Australia (ARIA)	65
Belgium (Ultratop 50 Flanders)	19
Denmark (Hitlisten)	8
Europe (European Hot 100 Singles)	43
Europe (European Airplay Top 50)	37
Finland (Suomen virallinen lista)	14
France (SNEP)	18
Ireland (IRMA)	18
Israel (IBA)	8
Luxembourg (Radio Luxembourg)	12
Netherlands (Dutch Top 40)	13
Netherlands (Single Top 100)	53
New Zealand (Recorded Music NZ)	16
South Africa (Springbok Radio)	3
Sweden (Trackslistan)	8
UK Singles (Official Charts)	13
US Billboard Hot 100	35
US Top 100 Pop Singles (Cashbox)	45

=== Year-end charts ===
1989 year-end chart performance for "Radio Romance"
Chart (1989)	Position
South Africa (Springbok Radio)	17
