= Celebrity Close Calls =

American television series depicting life-or-death situations

- Created by: Seth Jarrett
- Starring: Various celebrities
- Country of origin: United States
- No. of seasons: 1
- No. of episodes: 10

Production
- Running time: 45 minutes

Original release
- Network: BIO and Reelz Channel
- Release: June 18 – August 20, 2011

Celebrity Close Calls is a ten-episode television series broadcast on The Biography Channel. It is a reality show interviewing celebrities with near-death experiences. It aired for one season in 2011, following a pilot episode which first aired on February 15, 2010.

== Episodes ==
| No. | Title | Original release date |
|---|---|---|
| 0 | "Jane Seymour, Erik Estrada, Leif Garrett, and Coolio" | February 15, 2010 |
| 1 | "Ice-T, Cheryl Tiegs, Ed Begley Jr. & Yancy Butler" | June 18, 2011 |
| 2 | "Bobby Brown, Jewel, Morgan Fairchild & Elliott Yamin" | June 25, 2011 |
| 3 | "Niki Taylor, Gary Busey & Tiffany" | July 9, 2011 |
| 4 | "Jermaine Jackson, Angie Everhart, Elisabeth Röhm & Jose Canseco" | July 16, 2011 |
| 5 | "Lou Diamond Phillips, Brooke Burns & Parker Stevenson" | July 23, 2011 |
| 6 | "Louis Gossett Jr., Charlene Tilton, Jena Malone, Lynn Whitfield" | July 30, 2011 |
| 7 | "Peter Fonda, Joely Fisher & Annie Potts" | August 6, 2011 |
| 8 | "Scott Baio, Pam Grier, Morgan Fairchild & Greg Louganis" | August 13, 2011 |
| 9 | "Bret Michaels, Mindy McCready & Ty Murray" | August 20, 2011 |
