= Hold an Old Friend's Hand (song) =

Single by Tiffany

from the album Hold an Old Friend's Hand
- B-side: "Ruthless"
- Released: April 21, 1989
- Recorded: 1988
- Genre: Electronic rock
- Length: 4:24
- Label: MCA
- Songwriter: Donna Weiss
- Producer: George Tobin

Tiffany singles chronology
"Radio Romance" (1989)	"Hold an Old Friend's Hand" (1989)	"It's the Lover (Not the Love)" (1989)

Alternative cover
- CD promo single cover

"Hold an Old Friend's Hand" is a song by American pop singer Tiffany. It is the title track to her second studio album Hold an Old Friend's Hand (1988). It was released as the third single from the album on April 21, 1989, exclusively to North America, Australia and Japan. In Japan, the song was titled simply "Friends" (フレンズ, Furenzu). The song was written by Donna Weiss and was originally recorded by Brenda Patterson in 1973.

The song peaked at number 161 on the ARIA Singles Chart and number 37 on the US Adult Contemporary chart.

== Critical reception ==
Barry Walters of The San Francisco Examiner said the song conjured "images of pedophilia" due to Tiffany's age at the time. John Milward of The Scranton Times-Tribune said the music production was reminiscent of music by the Eagles and defined Tiffany's new sound. Ron Fell and Diane Rufer of the Gavin Report wrote this about it, "Written by Donna Weiss, who co-wrote "Bette Davis Eyes," this song takes Tiffany's career right to the core of A /C radio."

== Track listings and formats ==
7" and cassette single

1. "Hold an Old Friend's Hand" – 4:24
2. "Ruthless" – 3:40

== Commercial performance ==
"Hold an Old Friend's Hand" peaked at number 37 on the Adult Contemporary chart on June 10, 1989; it spent one week in the position. It spent eight weeks on the chart, becoming Tiffany's final single to enter a Billboard chart until "Higher" from Dust Off and Dance (2005) peaked at number 19 on the US Dance Club Songs in 2007.

== Personnel ==
Taken from the Hold an Old Friend's Hand booklet.

- John Duarte – drums and keyboard programming, arrangement
- Mike Thompson – guitar
- Richard Elliott – sax and solo
- Tiffany – background vocals

== Charts ==
Weekly chart performance for "Hold an Old Friend's Hand"
Chart (1989)	Peak position
Australia (ARIA)	161
US Adult Contemporary (Billboard)	37
US Adult Contemporary (Gavin Report)	35
US Adult Contemporary (Radio & Records)	25
