= Tiffany (album) =

1987 album by Tiffany

Studio album by Tiffany
- Released: June 29, 1987
- Recorded: 1986–1987
- Studio: George Tobin's recording studio (North Hollywood, California)
- Genre: Teen pop
- Length: 39:08
- Label: MCA
- Producer: George Tobin

Tiffany chronology
Tiffany (1987)	Hold an Old Friend's Hand (1988)

Singles from Tiffany
- 1. "Danny" Released: June 1987; 2. "I Think We're Alone Now" Released: August 16, 1987; 3. "Could've Been" Released: November 20, 1987; 4. "I Saw Him Standing There" Released: February 12, 1988; 5. "Feelings of Forever" Released: May 27, 1988

Tiffany is the debut studio album by American singer Tiffany, recorded when she was 14 and 15 years old, and released on June 29, 1987, by MCA Records. The album peaked at number 1 for two weeks in the US, making Tiffany the youngest female artist to achieve a number 1 album. Certified 4× Platinum by the Recording Industry Association of America (RIAA), the album sold over seven million copies worldwide.

Exploring adult themes, the album is a teen pop record with influences from pop, rock, disco, funk, dance, and new wave. During production, Tiffany turned away from the country music style of her childhood, and she embraced the pop sound and fashion of Stevie Nicks, encouraged by Tiffany's producer George Tobin.

The album received mixed-to-negative reviews, criticized for its calculated and unoriginal production. It spawned five singles, including the international hits "I Think We're Alone Now", "Could've Been", and "I Saw Him Standing There". To promote the album, Tiffany embarked on a nationwide shopping mall tour to give 60 free performances, helping her gain a fan base. The mall tour concept proved influential; it was later adapted by Britney Spears, Jessica Simpson and 98 Degrees.

== Background ==
Tiffany started singing at the age of two or four when her cousin taught her the lyrics to the Tanya Tucker song "Delta Dawn" at a supermarket. (Note: Conflicting sources say that Tiffany started singing at the age of two or four.) At the age of nine, she started her singing career with her stepfather's permission. After Tiffany performed "Delta Dawn" on a trailer bed at a street party in Norwalk, California, the Country Hoe Downers asked her to perform at special events and county fairs. Tiffany spent time as the group's lead singer after being encouraged by her parents. Tiffany also toured with country and western bands at social gatherings in Norwalk. By the age of 11, she became a frequent performer at school assemblies and parties. Without formal training, Tiffany mimicked pop and rock and roll songs she heard on the radio. She said that her discovery of rock music helped her develop "another way of singing." After she heard Stevie Nicks on the radio, she abandoned country music for mainstream pop music at the age of 13.

At the age of 12, Tiffany's family friend helped her meet producer George Tobin and sing country songs for him at his office. Approximately a year later, she recorded demo tapes at Tobin's studio in North Hollywood, California, which led to five record label offers and a seven-album contract with George Tobin. In 1985, she appeared as a junior singer on Star Search with Ed McMahon. During 1987, Tiffany toured with the Jets in regular venues, which received an "overwhelming" response.

== Production ==
After Tiffany signed a recording contract with Tobin in March 1986, he visited several record companies for a record label contract. He chose MCA Records from five prospects, and in April 1986, Tiffany signed a contract with MCA Records at the age of 14. Shortly afterward, production on the album began, continuing past Tiffany's 15th birthday. Tiffany recorded more than 40 songs, but only 10 of them were picked for the album. Production of the album lasted ten months, and was completed in early 1987.

Tiffany recorded her vocals for more than two days on each song, with the exception of "Could've Been", which only took two takes. Tiffany said that some songs were recorded three or four different ways with several styles and tempos. Tiffany and Tobin listened to everything from Black pop to hard rock and "settled on a mix" to create the "best possible album" for them.

== Music and lyrics ==
"Should've Been Me"
The vocal style of "Should've Been Me" was influenced by Stevie Nicks.

According to music critic Robert Christgau, Tiffany is a fantasy album about the "growing pains of a wholesome California teen". Musically, it is a teen pop album that explores genres including pop, rock, disco, funk, dance, and new wave. Lyrically, the album explored adult themes. The album included remakes of Tommy James and the Shondells' "I Think We're Alone Now" and the Beatles' "I Saw Her Standing There" (renamed "I Saw Him Standing There"). Prior to production of the album, Tobin spent a couple of years experimenting with different styles for her maturity. Due to Tiffany's mimic talents, Tiffany's vocal style and the album's material were strongly influenced by Stevie Nicks. In an interview with reporter Russell A. Stamets from 1987, Tiffany recalled that when she was in the studio, she and Tobin would "try each song in several [different] styles", including a "Stevie Nicks sound" for Tobin. The singing style was done for the album's opening track "Should've Been Me".

"Feelings of Forever"
"Feelings of Forever" is one of the ballads from the album. It explores pop rock and lyrically speaks about love. It incorporates the Rhodes piano and includes a "gigantic build-up".

The album's opening track, "Should've Been Me", explores mid-tempo rock, and tells a story of a girl "jealously obsessing on an ex-boyfriend's jacket." It incorporates "slow, steady" drum beats and raspy vocals reminiscent of Stevie Nicks. "Danny" is a mid-tempo track that conveys the "urgency of Tiffany's youth" during the refrains. "Spanish Eyes" incorporates latin pop elements. Janice Page of The Providence Journal commented that the song is "in the spirit" of Madonna's "La Isla Bonita". Music critic Joe Kowalski described the song as a "dark and moody piece done in an older, deeper voice." "Feelings of Forever" is a pop rock ballad about love. It incorporates the Rhodes piano and includes a "gigantic build-up". Music critic Paul Taylor stated that the song was reminiscent of music by Heart. "Kid on a Corner" is a mid-tempo backbeat ballad about a determination to grow up.

Tiffany's cover of "I Saw Her Standing There" explored genres of pop, disco, new wave, funk, and lounge rock. It included a "Prince-style funk" arrangement, with an intro and outro of "zombie vocal[s]", keyboards, guitar solos, and "slam bam" drums. "Johnny's Got the Inside Moves" is a mid-tempo song that explores disco music and conveys her vocals of "adolescent emotional hunger." Music critic Joe Kowalski described the song as "Whitney-esque". "Promises Made" is a love song. Agnes Torres of The Orlando Sentinel stated that the song was reminiscent of "Voices Carry" by 'Til Tuesday. Her cover of "I Think We're Alone Now" is a dance-pop track with elements of funk music. It is set to a "galloping Bananarama-like beat" and incorporates a "synthesizer backdrop". The album's final track, "Could've Been", is a ballad that includes more "grown-up" lyrics about losing and mourning the "great love of her life". Musically, it explores pop music and highlights Tiffany's vocal power.

== Promotion and release ==
=== Mall tour ===
Tiffany performing at the Bull Ring Shopping Centre in Birmingham, England (pictured in 1988)

After production for Tiffany was completed, MCA Records failed to implement a marketing plan, and the boxes of newly pressed albums sat in storage for months. MCA tried having Tiffany sing at nightclubs in New York City, but this tactic stalled. MCA executive Larry Solters said that the label was leery of losing money by promoting a teenager, especially since "the themes on the record are very adult themes." Solters finally decided to have Tiffany join an ongoing shopping mall marketing tour organized by the Shopping Center Network, and sponsored by Toyota, Clairol, and Adidas. The tour was officially named The Beautiful You: Celebrating The Good Life Shopping Mall Tour '87, but Tiffany's management team referred to the tour as The Tiffany Shopping Mall Tour '87. Tiffany's first mall appearance was on June 23, 1987, in The Bergan Mall in Paramus, New Jersey. She was 15 years old at the time, working during the summer vacation before her junior year of high school. MCA released the album on June 29, 1987, six days after Tiffany's first mall appearance.

During the mall tour, Tiffany performed three 20-minute concerts per day, spending two weekend days at ten different malls across the US, singing solo to pre-recorded backing tracks. Between sets, she signed autographs. Solters observed good results across a wider-than-expected range of ages, saying, "We're hitting every demographic. This is grassroots promotion." Her free tour was covered by the Los Angeles Times which quoted her co-manager Brad Schmidt saying, "If 'Tif is going to make it, she's going to do it first among 12- to 18-year-olds, and what better place to expose her than in America's playgrounds, the malls." Tiffany said that the first few concerts were poorly attended, and some retail stores complained about the noise. Prior to an appearance at Woodfield Mall outside of Chicago, the Chicago Sun-Times printed a story on July 31 describing Tiffany's mall strategy, and listing "I Think We're Alone Now" as an album highlight. After a radio station in Chicago began playing "I Think We're Alone Now" from the album, attendance increased considerably on the tour, allowing Tiffany to sell hundreds of albums. Co-manager and producer George Tobin videotaped the mall concerts himself, and assembled the footage to make the official music video for "I Think We're Alone Now". MCA released the song as a single in mid-August. People magazine featured Tiffany's mall tour in mid-September.

=== Singles ===
The album's first single, "Danny", was released in June 1987, but it failed to chart. In August, a Chicago radio station started to play Tiffany's cover version of Tommy James & the Shondells' song "I Think We're Alone Now". It was released as her second single on August 16, 1987, as a promotion of her first tour. On the week of November 7, 1987, the single peaked at number 1 on Billboard Hot 100 and remained for two weeks. It was also a success in the United Kingdom, peaking at number 1 for three weeks. The music video was later released, which was filmed by Tobin in several malls, including Ogden City Mall in Ogden, Utah, and Glendale Galleria in Glendale, California. Tiffany re-recorded the cover as a rock arrangement in April 2019.

Her third single, "Could've Been", was released on November 20, 1987. Benefiting from the momentum of her previous single, it peaked at number 1 on Billboard Hot 100 on the week of February 6, 1988, and remained for two weeks. It also peaked at number 1 on Billboard's Adult Contemporary Chart. At the age of 16 years, she became the youngest artist to have two consecutive number 1 singles. Internationally, the single was her first number 1 hit in Canada and Ireland.

Her fourth single, "I Saw Him Standing There", was released on February 12, 1988, on contemporary hit radio in the United States. It received moderate success, peaking at number 7 on Billboard Hot 100. It was the first remake of a song performed by the Beatles to reach the top ten since Earth, Wind & Fire's "Got to Get You into My Life" in 1978. It also charted highly in Canada and Ireland. The music video was directed by Jay Dubin and was filmed at Walt Disney World in Orlando, Florida. The music video premiered on March 23, 1988, on MTV, Night Tracks, and Hit Video USA. Her final single of the album, "Feelings of Forever", was released on May 27, 1988. It received minor success in the United States, the United Kingdom, and Canada.

== Commercial performance ==
During the week of September 26, 1987, the album debuted at number 130 on Billboard's Top Pop Albums chart. By December 11, 1987, the album sold one million copies in the US. It peaked at number 1 on the week of January 23, 1988, and remained for two weeks. At the age of 16 years, Tiffany became the youngest female artist to achieve a number 1 album, and the first female solo and third artist to chart on the Billboard 200 under the age of 18. The album stayed for 96 non-consecutive weeks on the chart. The album also peaked at number 1 in Canada and New Zealand. It charted highly in Australia and the United Kingdom.

The album was certified four-times Platinum by the Recording Industry Association of America (RIAA) on April 5, 1988. In Canada, it was certified five-times Platinum for shipping over 500,000 copies. In Australia, it sold over 100,000 copies. In the United Kingdom, it was certified Gold by the British Phonographic Industry for shipping over 100,000 copies.

== Critical reception ==
Professional ratings
Review scores
Source	Rating
AllMusic	2.5/5 stars
Robert Christgau	B
Orlando Sentinel	2/5 stars
Record Mirror	1/2
Rolling Stone	(Note: When the review was archived on the official website, the rating was incorrectly increased from 1 1/2 to 2 out of 5 stars.)

Upon its release, Tiffany received mixed-to-negative reviews from critics. Music critic Robert Christgau gave the album a "B", highlighting "Should've Been Me" and "I Saw Him Standing There" as "two schlock classics". Chris Tworney of Record Mirror wrote that the singer was the "latest in seemingly inexhaustible supply of virgin prunes to dominate [the] charts." Wayne Robins of Newsday criticized most of the songs as "superficial" and "bland", describing "I Saw Him Standing There" as "wrong" and praising "Spanish Eyes" as the "best of her songs". Len LaBarth of Delaware County Daily Times described the album as "far from spectacular". He praised "I Think We're Alone Now" as "nice and sprightly", but criticized "I Saw Him Standing There" as "quite horrid".

Agnes Torres of the Orlando Sentinel rated the album two out of five stars, criticizing the production as "busy" and songs as "sluggish" and "grating". Torres ranked "I Saw Him Standing There" as the worst, but described "Spanish Eyes" as "equally unnerving". In an unfavorable review, Anthony DeCurtis of Rolling Stone gave the album one-and-a-half out of five stars, describing the album as an "artificial construction that Tiffany occupies with neither authority nor uniqueness." DeCurtis criticized the production, songwriting, and management for "[letting] Tiff down", and described her cover of "I Think We're Alone Now" as "sterile" and "I Saw Him Standing There" as a "conceptual disaster". Cary Wills of The Courier-Journal gave the album an extremely negative review, lamenting "I Think We're Alone Now" as a "wad of fake funk/pop garbage" and "I Saw Him Standing There" as "equally embarrassing".

In a retrospective review, Bryan Buss of AllMusic described the material as "enjoyable without being schlocky", and reviewing tracks "Kid on a Corner", "Should've Been Me", "Johnny's Got the Inside Moves", and "Danny" as "all inoffensive, mid-tempo tunes that are more than just filler." Concluding the review, Buss stated that even though this is a "fair debut for a young singer with a voice she'd grow into", her follow-up, Hold an Old Friend's Hand, is "more consistently realized."

== Legacy ==
Tiffany was frequently compared to Debbie Gibson's album Out of the Blue, released six weeks later. Both artists were teenagers (Gibson being one year older), and both multi-Platinum albums were representative of teen pop, with Tiffany's public image described as more "free-spirited" than Gibson's "wholesome" persona. Even though Tiffany had more chart success than Gibson, Tiffany was seen as a mimic of Stevie Nicks and Madonna, while Gibson wrote her own songs and sang in her own style. A rivalry between Gibson and Tiffany was rumored by the media, but it was later revealed that the rumors were false. The two finally worked together in 2011, co-starring in the mockbuster sci-fi film Mega Python vs. Gatoroid, and they became friends.

Larry Solters's shopping mall tour concept was deemed successful for Tiffany, influencing several music artists to promote in shopping malls during the late 1990s and early 2000s. Britney Spears employed the strategy starting in August 1998 in a mall tour sponsored by L'Oreal called the L'Oreal Hair Zone Mall Tour, to promote Spears's first single, "...Baby One More Time". With the DreamChaser Tour, Jessica Simpson and 98 Degrees gained popularity by touring malls in mid-2001. To attract larger audiences, the DreamChaser Tour pushed the performances outside to the mall parking lot, bringing a portable stage with lights and enough sound equipment to cover 10,000 people.

== Track listing ==
Tiffany track listing
No.	Title	Writer(s)	Length
1.	"Should've Been Me"	Mark Paul	3:39
2.	"Danny"	Jody Moreing	4:00
3.	"Spanish Eyes"	Donna Weiss; John Duarte; Lauren Wood	3:56
4.	"Feelings of Forever"	Paul; Duarte	3:52
5.	"Kid on a Corner"	Steven McClintock; Tim James	4:02
6.	"I Saw Him Standing There"	Lennon–McCartney	4:12
7.	"Johnny's Got the Inside Moves"	Jon McElroy; Ned McElroy	3:20
8.	"Promises Made"	Paul; Duarte	4:50
9.	"I Think We're Alone Now"	Ritchie Cordell	3:48
10.	"Could've Been"	Lois Blaisch	3:31
Total length:			39:08

== Personnel ==
Personnel as listed in the album's liner notes:

- Tiffany – lead and backing vocals
- John Duarte – arrangements, synthesizers (1–6, 8–9), drum programming (1–9), keyboards (7), synth bass (7), additional synthesizers (10)
- Ned McElroy – keyboards (7)
- Steve Rucker – acoustic piano (10), synthesizers (10)
- Dann Huff – guitars (1, 3–5, 10)
- Chuck Yamek – guitars (1, 6, 9)
- Carl Verheyen – guitars (2)
- Craig T. Cooper – guitars (7)
- Willie Ornelas – drums (10)
- Richard Elliot – saxophone (1, 7)

=== Production ===
- George Tobin – producer, remixing, management
- Bill Smith – engineer and remixing (1–5, 7, 9–10)
- John Kerns – engineer and remixing (6, 8), additional recording
- Steve Holroyd – second engineer
- John Kliner – second engineer
- David Means – second engineer
- Bryan Rutter – second engineer
- Steve Hall – mastering at Future Disc (Hollywood, California)
- Brenda Farrell – production coordination
- Valerie Trotter – production coordination
- Larry Solters – "stunt" coordinator
- Irving Azoff – "miracles"
- Randee St. Nicholas – photography

== Charts ==
=== Weekly charts ===
Weekly chart performance for Tiffany
Chart (1987–1988)	Peak position
Argentinian Albums	19
Australian Albums (ARIA)	6
Canada Top Albums/CDs (RPM)	1
Dutch Albums (Album Top 100)	48
European Albums (Music & Media)	21
German Albums (Offizielle Top 100)	37
Japanese Albums (Oricon)	12
New Zealand Albums (RMNZ)	1
Norwegian Albums (VG-lista)	13
Swedish Albums (Sverigetopplistan)	35
Swiss Albums (Schweizer Hitparade)	17
UK Albums (Official Charts)	5
US Billboard 200	1

=== Year-end charts ===
Year-end chart performance for Tiffany
Chart (1988)	Position
Australian Albums (ARIA)	28
Canada Top Albums/CDs (RPM)	10
New Zealand Albums (RMNZ)	17
UK Albums (Gallup)	82
US Billboard 200	9
US Cash Box Top 100 Albums	11

== Certifications and sales ==
Certifications and sales for Tiffany
Region	Certification	Certified units/sales
Australia	—	100,000
Canada (Music Canada)	5× Platinum	500,000^{^}
Hong Kong (IFPI Hong Kong)	Platinum	20,000^{*}
New Zealand (RMNZ)	Platinum	15,000^{^}
United Kingdom (BPI)	Gold	100,000^{^}
United States (RIAA)	4× Platinum	4,000,000^{^}
Summaries
Asia	—	500,000
Worldwide	—	7,000,000
^{*} Sales figures based on certification alone.^{^} Shipments figures based on certification alone.
