= Mike Piccirillo =

American singer

- Born: 1951 (age 74–75)
- Origin: Los Angeles, California, U.S.
- Genres: Pop; rock
- Years active: 1976–present

Michael Lynn Piccirillo (born 1951) is an American record producer and songwriter who began working professionally in the Los Angeles music business in 1976. In conjunction with production partner George Tobin, and subsequently Gary Goetzman, Piccirillo co-produced 31 albums between 1976 and 1992.

== Career ==
Piccirillo has also been an underscore composer on many animated TV series. Between 1995 and 2004, Piccirillo's musical underscore appears on over 500 half-hour TV animated episodes, mainly for DIC Entertainment produced shows. He also composed the third theme for the company's 1987-2001 on-screen production logo. Many of these TV series also feature main title songs composed by Piccirillo. Animated series highlights include Sabrina: The Animated Series, Sabrina's Secret Life, Inspector Gadget's Field Trip, Sonic Underground, The Wacky World of Tex Avery, Trollz, Gadget Boy, Archie's Weird Mysteries, and many others. Piccirillo is still active in professional music production, songwriting and being a performing musician.

Piccirillo production hits include Smokey Robinson's “Being With You", Robert John's "Sad Eyes", and Kim Carnes' "More Love", along with many other charted songs and productions. Artists include La Toya Jackson, Natalie Cole, Smokey Robinson, Tiffany, Kim Carnes, Thelma Houston, The Staple Singers, Go West, Robert John, and many others.

Mike Piccirillo and music partner Gary Goetzman co-wrote the vast majority of the 100+ songs that were released on various artists' albums between 1976 and 1995.

== Works ==
In 1995, Piccirillo wrote and produced 15 songs that were featured in the Tom Hanks written and directed film That Thing You Do. Six of those songs appeared on the film's soundtrack CD.

Additional Piccirillo songs appear in approximately 28 theatrical films released between 1982 and 1995, including A Nightmare on Elm Street 4: The Dream Master, Police Academy 2, Child's Play, Fright Night, Kickboxer, Jetsons: The Movie, Big Momma's House, Little Monsters and many others.
