= Rose Tattoo (Tiffany album) =

Studio album by Tiffany
- Released: March 1, 2011
- Genre: Country
- Label: Only The Girl Inc. Productions
- Producer: Chris Roberts

Tiffany chronology
Just Me (2007)	Rose Tattoo (2011)	A Million Miles (2016)

Rose Tattoo is the eighth studio album by American pop singer Tiffany. Although her fourth album Dreams Never Die was influenced by the country music genre, Rose Tattoo represents Tiffany coming full circle, returning to the style she originally recorded in before switching to teen pop in the late 1980s. The singer described the sound of this new album as “Bonnie Raitt with a Stevie Ray Vaughan vibe.” The album's release was celebrated with a release party in Nashville, Tennessee on February 25, 2011.

== Track listing ==
1. "Feel The Music" (Tiffany, Julie Forester, Dee Briggs)
2. "Crazy Girls", duet with Lindsay Lawler (Tiffany, Chris Roberts, Lindsay Lawler)
3. "He's All Man" (Tiffany, Tommy Wright)
4. "He Won't Miss Me" (Tiffany, Diana Draeger)
5. "All Over You" (Tiffany, Lorna Flowers)
6. "Just Love Me" (Tiffany, Chris Roberts)
7. "Love You Good" (Tommy Wright)
8. "Just That Girl" (Tiffany, Chris Roberts, Lindsay Lawler)
