= Feelings of Forever =

Single by Tiffany

from the album Tiffany
- B-side: "Out of My Heart" "Heart Don't Break Tonight"
- Released: May 27, 1988
- Genre: Pop rock
- Length: 3:52
- Label: MCA
- Songwriters: Mark Paul; John Duarte
- Producer: George Tobin

Tiffany singles chronology
"I Saw Him Standing There" (1988)	"Feelings of Forever" (1988)	"All This Time" (1988)

"Feelings of Forever" is a song by American singer Tiffany. The song was released on May 27, 1988, as the fifth and final single from her first album Tiffany (1987). The song was written by Mark Paul and John Duarte, and was produced by George Tobin.

== Composition ==
"Feelings of Forever" is a pop rock ballad about love. It incorporated the Fender Rhodes piano and had a "gigantic build-up". Music critic Paul Taylor stated that the song was reminiscent of music by Heart.

== Reception ==
Paul Coffey of Evening Post gave the single two stars out of five, criticizing the song as "sickly" and concluding that it is "definitely an undeserved hit for Tiffany."

Professional ratings
Review scores
Source	Rating
Evening Post	2/5 stars

== Track listings and formats ==
7" single / Japanese 3" CD single

1. "Feelings of Forever"
2. "Out Of My Heart"

Cassette single / CD single / 12" single

1. "Feelings of Forever"
2. "Out Of My Heart"
3. "Heart Don't Break Tonight"

== Charts ==
Chart (1988)	Peak position
Canada Top Singles (RPM)	41
US Adult Contemporary (Billboard)	43
US Billboard Hot 100	50
UK Singles (OCC)	52
US Adult Contemporary (Radio & Records)	27
US Cashbox Top 100 Singles	55
