= All This Time (Tiffany song) =

Single by Tiffany

from the album Hold an Old Friend's Hand
- B-side: "Can't Stop a Heartbeat"
- Released: October 24, 1988
- Recorded: 1988
- Genre: Pop
- Length: 4:20
- Label: MCA
- Songwriters: Tim James; Steven McClintock
- Producer: George Tobin

Tiffany singles chronology
"Feelings of Forever" (1988)	"All This Time" (1988)	"Radio Romance" (1989)

Music video
- "All This Time" on YouTube

"All This Time" is a song by American teen pop singer Tiffany, recorded for her second studio album Hold an Old Friend's Hand (1988). Written by Tim James and Steven McClintock, and produced by Tiffany's manager George Tobin, it was released via MCA Records on October 24, 1988, as the lead single to the album. The track made its first appearance within the season premiere of the TV sitcom Growing Pains. Internationally, it was released on January 30, 1989, where it was released as the second single following "Radio Romance".

"All This Time" was a moderate success. It peaked at number 6 on the US Billboard Hot 100, becoming Tiffany's fourth and final top ten single on the chart. The track peaked at number 8 on the Cash Box Top 100 Singles and number 10 on the Adult Contemporary chart. Internationally, the track peaked within the top ten in Canada and Ecuador. It was less successful in other regions, peaking at number 24 in Ireland and number 47 in the United Kingdom.

== Release ==
"All This Time" was released on October 24, 1988, to contemporary hit radio in the United States. The song would then be released on January 30, 1989 to the United Kingdom via 7 inch and CD single.

== Music video ==
The music video was filmed at Knott's Berry Farm in Buena Park, California and was directed by Tobin. It debuted on December 24, 1988 on VH1 and Night Tracks. It was then debuted on January 7, 1989, on MTV.

=== Synopsis ===
Around 10 p.m., a taxi drops Tiffany at the train station. She walks through the empty boarding area, hugging her chest with her arms and waist. She follows the train as it prepares to stop. She walks into an auditorium and leans against a seat, staring into the spotlight shining on her. On a darkened stage, she performs. The breeze lifts up her hair while she sits on the windowsill in the family room. She rides a carousel alone. Back at the family room, she unwraps some letters tied with a pink bow and reads them. She walks on the stage, looking at the red scarlet red columns and stairs set up for her performance. While the sun sets, she leans against the railing at the pier. On stage, she is filmed through a sepia filter and hazy glass. She raises her hand, feeling the rain drops and walks up the steps to her room. A Charlie Chaplin puppet bounces outside. She walks to Knott's Memory Lane and stands by the fountain. Lit in white, she sits on the windowsill. She stops at Cestrella's and puts in a quarter in the slot. The animatronic fortune teller turns her head to the left. She performs on a strip of film. By the end of the video, she waits at the train station. The fortune from the game reads: "The sun still shines. The sun still sets." until it faded in white.

== Commercial performance ==
"All This Time" debuted on the Billboard Hot 100 the week of November 5, 1988 at number 90. By the end of 1988, "All This Time" had risen to number 24. On February 11, "All This Time" reached its peak position of number six on the chart before making a sharp fall to number 20 the next week. The song would overall spend 21 weeks on the chart. "All This Time" is, to date, Tiffany's last top ten hit on the Hot 100. "All This Time" also became a hit on the Adult Contemporary chart, peaking at number ten.

The song itself had minor success internationally. "All This Time" debuted on the UK Singles Chart (where it was released as the album's second single) the week of 11 February 1989 at its peak position of number 47, where it stayed for two consecutive weeks. The song was last seen on 25 February, at number 55. It is also Tiffany's last entry in the UK to date. The song debuted on the Canadian RPM 100 Singles Chart on December 17, 1988 at number 93, later rising to a peak position of number four.

== Track listings and formats ==
US 7" vinyl and cassette single

1. "All This Time – 4:20
2. "Can't Stop a Heartbeat" – 4:45

European vinyl and CD single

1. "All This Time" – 4:20
2. "I'll Be the Girl" – 4:27
3. "I Think We're Alone Now" (Extended Version) – 6:35

== Charts ==
=== Weekly charts ===
Weekly chart performance for "All This Time"
Chart (1988–1989)	Peak position
Australia (ARIA)	120
Canada Top Singles (RPM)	4
Ecuador (UPI)	8
Mexico (HIT PARADE)	8
UK Singles (Official Charts)	47
US Billboard Hot 100	6
US Adult Contemporary (Billboard)	10
US Adult Contemporary (Radio & Records)	9
US Contemporary Hit Radio (Radio & Records)	12
US Adult Contemporary (Gavin Report)	12
US Top 40 (Gavin Report)	13
US Top 100 Singles (Cashbox)	8

=== Year-end charts ===
Year-end chart performance for "All This Time"
Chart (1989)	Position
Canada Top Singles (RPM)	68
United States (Billboard)	78
US Adult Contemporary (Radio & Records)	68
US Adult Contemporary (Gavin Report)	96
