= I Saw Her Standing There =

1963 single by the Beatles

- US picture sleeve (reverse)

Single by the Beatles
- A-side: "I Want to Hold Your Hand"
- Released: 22 March 1963 (UK Please Please Me album); 26 December 1963 (US single)
- Recorded: 11 February 1963
- Studio: EMI, London
- Genre: Rock and roll
- Length: 2:55 (UK Please Please Me album version); 2:50 (US/North American version) (Note: McCartney counting "one, two, three" is omitted; recording starts with "four")
- Label: Capitol
- Songwriter: Lennon–McCartney
- Producer: George Martin

The Beatles US singles chronology
"She Loves You" (1963)	"I Want to Hold Your Hand" / "I Saw Her Standing There" (1963)	"Twist and Shout" (1964)

Music video
- "I Saw Her Standing There" (Remastered 2009) on YouTube

"I Saw Her Standing There" is a song by the English rock band the Beatles, written by Paul McCartney and John Lennon. It is the opening track on the band's 1963 debut UK album Please Please Me and their debut US album Introducing... The Beatles.

In December 1963, Capitol Records released the song in the United States as the B-side on the label's first single by the Beatles, "I Want to Hold Your Hand". While the A-side topped the US Billboard chart for seven weeks starting 1 February 1964, "I Saw Her Standing There" entered the Billboard Hot 100 on 8 February 1964, remaining there for 11 weeks, peaking at No. 14. The song placed on the Cashbox chart for only one week at No. 100 on the same week of its Billboard debut. In 2004, "I Saw Her Standing There" was ranked No. 139 on Rolling Stone's list of the 500 Greatest Songs of All Time.

== Composition ==
Originally titled "Seventeen", the song was conceived by McCartney when driving home from a Beatles' concert in Southport, Merseyside as a modern take on the traditional song "As I Roved Out", a version of "Seventeen Come Sunday" that he had heard in Liverpool in 1960. According to Beatles biographer Mark Lewisohn, McCartney first worked out the chords and arrangement on an acoustic guitar at the family home of his Liverpool friend and fellow musician Rory Storm on the evening of 22 October 1962. Two days later, McCartney was writing lines for the song during a visit to London with his then-girlfriend Celia Mortimer, who was seventeen at the time herself. The song was completed about a month later at McCartney's Forthlin Road home in collaboration with Lennon and performed as part of their set in December 1962 in the Star-Club in Hamburg.

McCartney later described in Beat Instrumental how he went about the song's composition: "Here's one example of a bit I pinched from someone: I used the bass riff from 'Talkin' About You' by Chuck Berry in 'I Saw Her Standing There'. I played exactly the same notes as he did and it fitted our number perfectly. Even now, when I tell people, I find few of them believe me; therefore, I maintain that a bass riff hasn't got to be original." Berry's "I'm Talking About You" was performed by the Beatles and the song appears on their albums Live! at the Star-Club in Hamburg, Germany; 1962 and On Air – Live at the BBC Volume 2.

The lyrics were written in a Liverpool Institute exercise book. Remember: The Recollections and Photographs of the Beatles, a book by McCartney's brother Mike McCartney, includes a photograph taken in the front room of his home of Lennon and McCartney writing the song while strumming their acoustic guitars and reading the exercise book. It typified how Lennon and McCartney would later work in partnership, as McCartney subsequently reflected: "I had 'She was just seventeen,' and then 'never been a beauty queen'. When I showed it to John, he screamed with laughter, and said 'You're joking about that line, aren't you?'" According to McCartney, "We came up with, 'You know what I mean.' Which was good, because you don't know what I mean." In a 1988 interview, McCartney stated that "It was one of the first times he ever went 'What? Must change that ...'" Lennon said: "That's Paul doing his usual good job of producing what George Martin used to call a 'potboiler'. I helped with a couple of the lyrics." The songwriting credit on the Please Please Me liner notes is "McCartney–Lennon", which differs from the more familiar "Lennon–McCartney" that appears on subsequent releases.

== Recording ==
The first live recording was made at the Cavern Club at the end of 1962. Lennon did not play rhythm guitar; he played harmonica in the introduction and during the verses. Lennon and McCartney laughed when they sang "Well we danced all night/And I held her tight/And I held her hand in mine" the second time.

The song was recorded at EMI Studios on 11 February 1963 and engineered by Norman Smith, as part of the marathon recording session that produced 10 of the 14 songs on Please Please Me. The Beatles were not present for the mixing session on 25 February 1963. It was not common practice for bands to be present at such sessions at that time.

On the album, the song starts with a rousing "One, two, three, four!" count-in by McCartney. Usually count-ins are edited off the final audio mix; however, record producer George Martin wanted to create the effect that the album was a live performance: "I had been up to the Cavern and I'd seen what they could do, I knew their repertoire, and I said 'Let's record every song you've got, come down to the studios and we'll just whistle through them in a day'". Martin took the count-in from take 9, which was considered 'especially spirited' and spliced it onto take 1. Music journalist Richard Williams suggested that this dramatic introduction to their debut album was just as stirring as Elvis Presley's "Well, it's one for the money, two for the show ..." on his opening track, "Blue Suede Shoes", for his debut album seven years earlier. It also made the point that the Beatles were a live band as, at that time, they opened their set with this song. On the first American release of the song, issued on Vee Jay Records, the count was edited out—but the "Four!" is still audible.

The full take 9 version of the song appears on the "Free as a Bird" CD single as a B side, released for the first time.

Take 2 of the song was released on The Beatles Bootleg Recordings 1963, which was an album released exclusively to iTunes in 2013.

== Reception ==
In its contemporary review of the US single, Cash Box described it as an "engaging" song that is "hard-hitting teen stuff."

In a retrospective review, Richie Unterberger called the song "a highlight of the Beatles' first album" and "the first Lennon–McCartney song to become a rock standard".

== Charts ==
=== Weekly charts ===
Chart (1964)	Peak position
Australia (Kent Music Report) (B-side: Love Me Do)	1
New Zealand (Lever Hit Parade)	1
Canada (CHUM Chart)	1
Denmark (Salgshitlisterne Top 20)	1
Swedish Kvällstoppen Chart	13
US Billboard Hot 100	14
US Cash Box Top 100	100

=== Year-end charts ===
Chart (1964)	Rank
US Billboard Hot 100	95

== Certifications ==
Region	Certification	Certified units/sales
New Zealand (RMNZ)	Gold	15,000^{‡}
United Kingdom (BPI)	Silver	200,000^{‡}
^{‡} Sales+streaming figures based on certification alone.

== Releases ==
- British LP: Please Please Me
- British EP: The Beatles (No. 1)
- American LP: Introducing... The Beatles
- American single: "I Want to Hold Your Hand"
- American LP: Meet the Beatles!
- Canadian LP: The Beatles' Long Tall Sally

== Personnel ==
- Paul McCartney – lead vocals, bass guitar, hand claps
- John Lennon – harmony vocals, rhythm guitar, hand claps
- George Harrison – lead guitar, hand claps
- Ringo Starr – drums, hand claps

Personnel per Ian MacDonald

== Later performances by Beatles ==
=== John Lennon ===
"I Saw Her Standing There"

Single by Elton John Band featuring John Lennon and the Muscle Shoals Horns
- B-side: "Whatever Gets You Thru the Night"; "Lucy in the Sky with Diamonds"
- Released: 1981
- Recorded: 28 November 1974
- Venue: Madison Square Garden (New York)
- Length: 3:34
- Label: DJM
- Songwriter: Lennon–McCartney
- Producer: Gus Dudgeon

Elton John singles chronology
"Les aveux" (1981)	"I Saw Her Standing There" (1981)	"Nobody Wins" (1981)

John Lennon singles chronology
"Watching the Wheels" (1981)	"I Saw Her Standing There" (1981)	"Love" (1982)

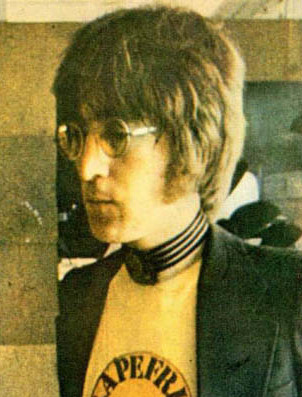
John Lennon (pictured in 1972) performed the song with Elton John and his band in 1974

A live version was recorded at Madison Square Garden on 28 November 1974 by the Elton John Band with John Lennon, and released as the B-side to the former's "Philadelphia Freedom" single. The song is available on the Lennon box set, and on Elton John's To Be Continued... box set as well as the expanded CD edition of his 1976 live album Here and There and Elton John's Rare Masters. Lennon's introduction:

I'd like to thank Elton and the boys for having me on tonight. We tried to think of a number to finish off with so I can get out of here and be sick, and we thought we'd do a number of an old, estranged fiancé of mine, called Paul. This is one I never sang, it's an old Beatle number, and we just about know it.

This was the last major live performance by Lennon. After Lennon's death, the track was released as a single and reached No. 40 on the UK Singles Chart in March 1981, making it the first time that any version of the song had entered the UK charts.

=== Paul McCartney ===
McCartney included "I Saw Her Standing There" on his live albums Tripping the Live Fantastic (1990), Back in the US (2002) and Back in the World (2003). In 1987, he recorded a new version for his album CHOBA B CCCP, but left it to outtakes. The song has become a mainstay of McCartney's live sets, and a special version was played when McCartney and his band returned to Liverpool in June 2008. It featured special guest drummer Dave Grohl, the lead singer of the Foo Fighters and ex-drummer of Nirvana. In 2007, McCartney performed a secret gig at Amoeba Music in Hollywood – this performance appeared on the EP Amoeba's Secret and earned him a Grammy Award for Best Solo Rock Vocal Performance nomination in 2009.

McCartney performed "I Saw Her Standing There" at the 1986 Prince's Trust Rock Gala, as part of the 10th anniversary celebration of HRH Prince Charles' charity. He was supported by an all-star band featuring Elton John, Eric Clapton, Phil Collins, Mark Knopfler, and Ray King. Interviewed at the time, McCartney said: "It is a good thrill playing with musicians of this calibre ... since it was a birthday thing, they wanted to do something silly at the end, and that's me". McCartney also performed the song at Taylor Swift and Travis Kelce’s wedding, which took place on July 3, 2026, at Madison Square Garden.

=== George Harrison and Ringo Starr ===
George Harrison and Ringo Starr also performed the song with Bruce Springsteen, Billy Joel, Mick Jagger, and Bob Dylan, amongst others, at the Beatles' induction into the Rock and Roll Hall of Fame. This makes it the only song by the Beatles that all four members performed on stage during their respective solo careers to any extent.

== Tiffany version ==
"I Saw Him Standing There"
- North American; Australian; Japanese cover

Single by Tiffany

from the album Tiffany
- B-side: "Mr. Mambo"; "Gotta Be Love"
- Released: 12 February 1988
- Recorded: 1987
- Genre: Pop; new wave; funk; disco; lounge rock
- Length: 4:12 (album version); 3:57 (single remix)
- Label: MCA
- Songwriter: Lennon–McCartney
- Producer: George Tobin

Tiffany singles chronology
"Could've Been" (1988)	"I Saw Him Standing There" (1988)	"Feelings of Forever" (1988)

Music video
- "I Saw Him Standing There" on YouTube

"I Saw Her Standing There" was later covered by American teen pop artist Tiffany, re-titled to "I Saw Him Standing There". It was released on 12 February 1988, as the fourth single from her self-titled debut album (1987). It was released on MCA Records and was produced by George Tobin.

Despite negative reception, Tiffany's cover became a success, reaching the top ten on the US Billboard Hot 100 and UK Singles Chart. In the former, it was the first remake of a song performed by the Beatles to reach the top ten since Earth, Wind & Fire's "Got to Get You into My Life" in 1978.

=== Critical reception ===
Tiffany's version of the song was nearly universally panned by critics. Richard Lowe of Smash Hits considered this cover "an affront to taste and decency and will visibly cringe every time they hear that nasty little 'synth' 'riff'." Wayne Robins of Newsday reviewed it poorly, commented that it "sounded wrong." In a review for the Delaware County Daily Times, Len LaBarth criticized the cover as being "quite horrid." Anthony DeCurtis of Rolling Stone reviewed that the song is a "conceptual disaster". In his review, Agnes Torres of The Orlando Sentinel ranked the song as the worst of the songs in her self-titled album. One of the few positive reviews came from Cashbox, writing that she sang the song with "a real growling energy." Music critic Robert Christgau highlighted the track as one of the "two schlock classics", stating that it "drags a rock and roll classic through the mud by its cheesy Prince-schlock synth riff."

=== Music video ===
A live music video was released for the track. It was directed by Jay Dubin and was filmed at Walt Disney World in Orlando, Florida. It was premiered on 23 March 1988, on MTV, Night Tracks, and Hit Video USA.

=== Chart performance ===
Tiffany version

Chart (1988)	Peak position
Australia (ARIA)	10
Canada Retail Singles (The Record)	4
Canada Top Singles (RPM)	4
Denmark (Hitlisten)	49
Ecuador (UPI)	3
Europe (Eurochart Hot 100 Singles)	28
Ireland (IRMA)	4
Japan (Oricon)	15
Netherlands (Single Top 100)	82
New Zealand (Recorded Music NZ)	3
UK Singles (Official Charts)	8
US Billboard Hot 100	7
US Hot Crossover 30 (Billboard)	27
US Top 100 Pop Singles (Cashbox)	13
US Top 40 (Gavin Report)	9
US Contemporary Hit Radio (Radio & Records)	11
West Germany (GfK)	40

=== Release history ===
Release dates and format(s) for "I Saw Him Standing There"
Region	Date	Format(s)	Label(s)	Ref.
United States	12 February 1988	CHR/Pop radio	MCA	
Japan	25 March 1988	Mini CD single	MCA	
Japan	11 May 1988	Mini-album single	MCA	
United Kingdom	23 May 1988	7"; 12"; CD single	MCA	
Australia	25 May 1988	7"; 12" single	MCA	
