= Dust Off and Dance =

Studio album by Tiffany
- Released: May 2005
- Genres: Electronica; dance
- Length: 49:20
- Label: Backroom Entertainment
- Producer: Tim Feehan

Tiffany chronology
The Color of Silence (2000)	Dust Off and Dance (2005)	Just Me (2007)

Singles from Dust Off and Dance
- 1. "Be with U Tonite" Released: December 2005; 2. "Na Na Na" Released: March 2006; 3. "Ride it" Released: August 2006; 4. "Fly" Released: January 2007

Dust Off and Dance is the sixth studio album by American singer Tiffany, released in May 2005. Its style is electronica and dance music, representing a departure from the styles she has used in earlier albums, and of particular interest to dance clubs, where its songs have achieved some success. Tiffany has stated that this album is especially aimed at the gay community, which has represented a significant portion of her fan base; she said, "I have done the complete gay album."

Tiffany did not have a record contract at the time, so this album was released independently and sold online at the CDBaby site, where it was for a while the top-selling CD. It was also made downloadable in the iTunes music store.

Tiffany has been performing in various places in the US and the UK, including songs from this album as well as her earlier releases and cover songs.

By December 2005, the song "Be With U Tonite" was being played heavily on some dance-format radio stations.

Several tracks from the album ("Ride It", "Na Na Na" and "Fly") have been featured in several episodes of the television series Ugly Betty.

"Ride It" was featured in a season two episode of Brothers & Sisters.

"I Think We're Alone Now" is a re-recording, in a different arrangement, of Tiffany's 1987 version which catapulted her to international stardom.

In late April 2008, a track with the same name as this album (but not found on the album), "Dust Off and Dance", became available for download on the web. The song is Tiffany doing vocals for a dance team called Hydra Productions, and the song is found on their album Liquid.

== Track listing ==
1. "Be with U Tonite" (Tiffany, Tim Feehan, Joe Brooks) – 5:09
2. "Ride It" (Tiffany, Tim Feehan) – 4:54
3. "Kama Sutra" (Tim Feehan, Dre Wilson) (featuring Dre Wilson) – 4:39
4. "Na Na Na" (Tiffany, Tim Feehan, Joe Brooks) – 3:46
5. "Everyone Get Down" (Tiffany, Tim Feehan, Joe Brooks) – 3:30
6. "Fly" (Tiffany, Tim Feehan) – 3:30
7. "Artificial Girlfriend" (Tiffany, Tim Feehan, Joe Brooks) – 3:53
8. "Sacrifice" (Tiffany, Tim Feehan, Joe Brooks) – 6:19
9. "I Luv How You Feel" (Tiffany, Tim Feehan, Joe Brooks) – 4:12
10. "I Think We're Alone Now" (Ritchie Cordell) – 4:54
11. "Artificial Girlfriend" (Second Sun Remix) – 4:23

== Personnel ==
- Joe Brooks – guitar, piano, backing vocals
- Ron Davis – photography
- Tim Feehan – guitar, programming, backing vocals
- Janine Gobeil – backing vocals
- Jawa – rap
- Second Sun – remixing
- Tiffany – vocals, backing vocals
