= Hit Video USA =

American music video television network

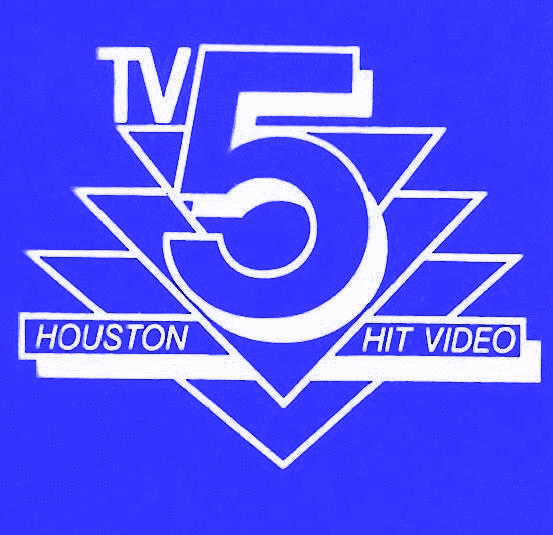
K05HU logo

Hit Video USA was a 24-hour music video television network based out of Houston, Texas. The station debuted in 1985 as a low power television station in Houston, operating on channel 5 there as 'TV5'. From 1985 to 1993, the station was located on the 35th floor of the Allied Bank Plaza/First Interstate Plaza (now Wells Fargo Plaza), a skyscraper in Downtown Houston.

== History ==
On September 17, 1987, a station spokesperson explained that the channel would sign off within 30 days unless it received $5 to $6 million in new equity. By 1990, it distributed music videos to 57 television stations in the United States. The venture removed obscenities from music. Across the country, several independent TV stations elected to carry the programming, along with numerous cable television systems.

Original Veejays included Chris Kinkade, Suzanne Vafiadis, Greg Johnson, EJ Thacker, Karen Kay, Todd Stevens, Eric Easton, Betsy King and Dangerous Darren Burns.

== Backlash ==
MTV, alarmed by the competition, began making exclusive deals with record companies -- effectively blocking Hit Video USA from broadcasting some of the most popular videos ever made.

== Shutdown ==
Hit Video USA owner Constance Wodlinger sued in federal court, claiming numerous violations of the nation's antitrust statutes. The litigation, protracted for many years by the lawyers, was finally settled out of court. Viacom, owner of MTV, bought out Wodlinger and closed the network down.
