= Could've Been (Tiffany song) =

1987 single by Tiffany

Single by Tiffany

from the album Tiffany
- B-side: "The Heart of Love"
- Released: November 20, 1987
- Recorded: 1987
- Genre: Pop
- Length: 3:32
- Label: MCA
- Songwriter: Lois Blaisch
- Producer: George Tobin

Tiffany singles chronology
"I Think We're Alone Now" (1987)	"Could've Been" (1987)	"I Saw Him Standing There" (1988)

Music video
- "Could've Been" on YouTube

Professional ratings
Review scores
Source	Rating
Number One	4/5 stars

"Could've Been" is a song by American teen-pop artist Tiffany, released as the third single from her debut album, Tiffany (1987). The track was written by Lois Blaisch and produced by George Tobin. Could've Been was discovered by music industry Insiders Don Charles McGovern who worked under the George Tobin Music Production umbrella, McGovern and Schmidt found Lois Blaich singing Could've Been in a Hungry Tiger restaurant in Thousand Oaks, California and knew it was a hit and brought the song to Producer, George Tobbin who then was developing Tiffany. It was released first to North America on November 20, 1987. The song became a hit, topping the charts of the United States, Canada, and Ireland.

== Background ==
Lois Blaisch said in an interview with Songfacts that the inspiration for the song came from her oral surgeon ex-boyfriend. She described her ex-boyfriend as someone who led her with lies and that she fell in love with the idea of him, not actually him.

== Chart performance ==
After debuting at number 86 on the US Billboard Hot 100 on November 28, 1987, "Could've Been" quickly rose up the chart and spent two weeks at number one in February, becoming Tiffany's second consecutive number-one hit following "I Think We're Alone Now". She became the first female artist in the rock era to have their first two singles top the chart and the first female teen singer since Brenda Lee to achieve the feat. It was also the third number one single in 15 months following Boston's "Amanda" and Michael Jackson and Siedah Garrett's "I Just Can't Stop Loving You" to not have a video to be promoted alongside it. She also became the first artist since 1985 to hold the top spot of the US and UK charts simultaneously with different songs; "Could've Been" was number one in the United States while "I Think We're Alone Now" was number one in the United Kingdom.

== Critical reception ==
John Aizlewood from Number One declared the song as "mighty", noting how "she croons and how she moves the emotions like a large cheque."

== Music video ==
"Could've Been" never had an official music video as network executives felt the lyrics would not sound believable coming from a then 14-year-old Tiffany. However, a live music video was sent to networks which featured fans singing along to Tiffany's performance.

== Track listing ==
- 7-inch single and cassette single
1. Could've Been – 4:00
2. The Heart of Love – 3:57

== Charts ==
=== Weekly charts ===
Chart (1987–1988)	Peak position
Australia (Australian Music Report)	8
Belgium (Ultratop 50 Flanders)	17
Canada (The Record)	2
Canada Top Singles (RPM)	1
Canada Adult Contemporary (RPM)	1
Denmark (Hitlisten)	4
Europe (Eurochart Hot 100)	11
Finland (Suomen virallinen lista)	12
Ireland (IRMA)	1
Italy Airplay (Music & Media)	7
Netherlands (Dutch Top 40)	25
Netherlands (Single Top 100)	21
New Zealand (Recorded Music NZ)	5
Panama (UPI)	3
Paraguay (UPI)	8
South Africa (Springbok Radio)	12
Sweden (Sverigetopplistan)	7
UK Singles (Official Charts)	4
US Billboard Hot 100	1
US Adult Contemporary (Billboard)	1
US Contemporary Hit Radio (Radio & Records)	1
US Adult Contemporary (Radio & Records)	1

=== Year-end charts ===
Chart (1988)	Position
Australia (ARIA)	38
Canada Top Singles (RPM)	4
New Zealand (RIANZ)	28
UK Singles (OCC)	56
US Billboard Hot 100	8
US Adult Contemporary (Billboard)	34
US Contemporary Hit Radio (Radio & Records)	7
US Adult Contemporary (Radio & Records)	37

== Certifications ==
Region	Certification	Certified units/sales
Canada (Music Canada)	Gold	50,000^{^}
^{^} Shipments figures based on certification alone.

== See also ==
- List of Billboard Hot 100 number-one singles of 1988
- List of Billboard number-one Adult Contemporary singles of 1988
- List of RPM Top Singles number-one singles of 1988
- List of Irish Singles Chart number-one singles of 1988
