= Steven McClintock =

American songwriter

- Also known as: Steve McClintock, Steven McClintock
- Genres: Pop music, rock music, folk music, Americana, country music, vocal, jazz
- Occupation: songwriter/producer/publisher/singer
- Instrument(s): Guitar, bass guitar, piano, french horn
- Years active: 1975–present
- Labels: 37 Records, Arista Records, Clearwater Records

Steven McClintock is an American singer, songwriter, and a music producer, with almost 20 million records sold to his credit. He has written top 40 hit songs in country, pop and AOR. He has been a part of the music group Fertitta & McClintock (with David Fertitta) since the mid-1970s (they won the "Overall Grand Prize" and "Best Group/Duo" at the International Acoustic Music Awards). He also has done solo work like the song "Maybe Love" on the Jetsons: The Movie soundtrack, as well as "Edge of a Dream", the soundtrack to the movie Space Mutiny, which was memorably lambasted by the cast of Mystery Science Theater 3000, the song was likewise mocked when it appeared in the closing credits as "Music rejected by the band Survivor," with the 'bots (Tom Servo and Crow T. Robot) "singing along" using lyrics from other tracks. In January 2009, the track was finally released commercially through McClintock's official Myspace website.

He co-writes with Tim James and together they formed McJames Music Inc. McClintock has recorded two solo albums, and he won a BMI Songwriter Award for Tiffany's Billboard Hot 100 No. 6 hit "All This Time".

In 2019 he managed Michael Peterson, and recorded songs for his solo album.

== Artists who have recorded songs written, published or produced by McClintock ==
- White Apple Tree
- Andy Williams
- Shiny Toy Guns
- Robin Schulz
- Michael Peterson
- Tiffany
- Pat Boone
- Fertitta & McClintock
- Juice Newton (Take Heart)
- Wickety Wak
- Tumbleweed
- Danny Shirley (of Confederate Railroad)
- Victoria Shaw
- Paul Jefferson
- Sixwire
- ATC (the band) A Touch of Class
- Alex Boye
- Trademark
- Crowtown
- The Nelsons
- Pingpong
- Damon Sharpe (of Guys Next Door)
- PC Quest
- Judy Akin
- Cris Barber
- Alana Lee
- Mark Vance
- Shuja
