= George Tobin =

American record producer

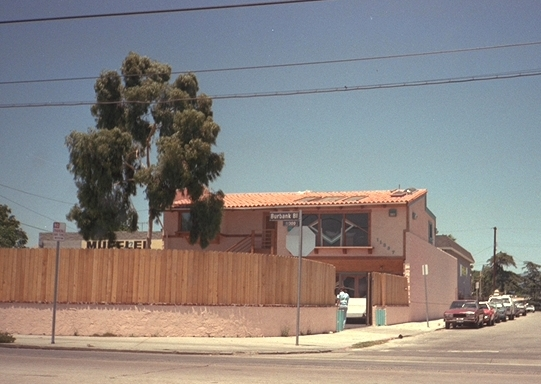
Tobin's North Hollywood studio in 1990

George Tobin is a record producer who has produced albums for a long list of musical artists including Robert John, Smokey Robinson, Kim Carnes, Kicking Harold, and PC Quest. He is best known, however, for discovering, managing, and producing the teenage singer Tiffany and showcasing her in malls across the country. From the 1980s, Tobin owned a large recording studio complex in North Hollywood, California, which was frequently rented by people making demo tapes and radio commercials. Tiffany was recording a demo at the studio at age 12 when Tobin heard her and decided that she could be a star; soon, he was managing and producing her. Under Tobin's management, Tiffany released two very successful albums (Tiffany and Hold an Old Friend's Hand), and toured for two years with New Kids on the Block. Although Tiffany separated from Tobin's management in 1989, the two briefly reunited to record the 1993 album Dreams Never Die which Tobin produced. Ultimately, the album only saw release in Asia before Tiffany and Tobin went their separate ways again.

In the 1990s, he pursued business ventures in Las Vegas, Nevada, including buying radio station KMMK and changing it to KEDG the Edge. By 2005 his businesses, George Tobin Music and Headliner Records, were based in Las Vegas and Boca Raton, Florida. In 2005 Tobin re-released Tiffany's album Dreams Never Die with an additional six tracks taken from early Tiffany recording sessions at Tobin's studio and made it available to a wider audience than it had seen previously.

== Selected albums and songs produced by Tobin ==
- Kim Carnes, Romance Dance (Produced in association with Mike Piccirillo) - single "More Love" #10
- Natalie Cole, Happy Love, (Produced in association with Mike Piccirillo)
- Robert John, Robert John - (Produced in association with Mike Piccirillo) - single "Sad Eyes" #1
- New Edition, All For Love - single "With You All The Way" #7 R&B
- PC Quest, PC Quest & Directions - (Produced in association with Mike Piccirillo), single "After The Summer's Gone" #41
- Smokey Robinson, Being With You (Produced in association with Mike Piccirillo) - single "Being With You" #1 R&B, #2 pop (3 weeks)
- Smokey Robinson, Yes It's You Lady (Produced in association with Mike Piccirillo) - single "Tell Me Tomorrow" #1 R&B, #33 pop
- Tiffany, Tiffany - singles "Could've Been" #1, "I Think We're Alone Now" #1, "I Saw Him Standing There" #7
- Tiffany, Hold an Old Friend's Hand - single "All This Time" #6
- Tiffany, Dreams Never Die - single "If Love is Blind"
