= I Think We're Alone Now =

1967 single by Tommy James and the Shondells

- US single picture sleeve

Single by Tommy James and the Shondells

from the album I Think We're Alone Now
- B-side: "Gone, Gone, Gone"
- Released: January 1967
- Recorded: December 24, 1966
- Studio: Allegro, New York City
- Genre: Pop rock; bubblegum pop; garage rock
- Length: 2:08
- Label: Roulette
- Songwriter: Ritchie Cordell
- Producer: Ritchie Cordell

Tommy James and the Shondells singles chronology
"It's Only Love" (1966)	"I Think We're Alone Now" (1967)	"Mirage" (1967)

Music video
- "I Think We're Alone Now" on YouTube

"I Think We're Alone Now" is a song written and composed by Ritchie Cordell that was first recorded by Tommy James and the Shondells. It was a major hit for the group, reaching number 4 on the US Hot 100 in April 1967. It finished at No. 12 on Billboard magazine's year-end singles chart for 1967.

The song has been covered several times by other artists, most notably by Tiffany in 1987 and The Birthday Massacre in 2008. The Tiffany recording reached number 1 on the charts of various countries including the US, UK, Canada, and New Zealand. Other cover versions have also charted, including those by the Rubinoos (number 45 US, 1977) and Girls Aloud (number 4 UK, 2006).

== Composition ==
The writing of the song was credited to Ritchie Cordell, who wrote or co-wrote many songs for Tommy James, including the follow-up single to "I Think We're Alone Now", "Mirage" and its B-side "Run, Run, Baby, Run", and 1968's "Mony Mony". Cordell and his regular songwriting partner Bo Gentry gave the song to Tommy James, who thought it sounded like a hit. According to Tommy James, "I Think We're Alone Now" was written by Cordell and Gentry, but as Gentry was still under contract to Kama Sutra Records, the head of Roulette Records, Morris Levy, agreed to a deal naming Cordell as sole writer but splitting the royalties with Gentry.

The song was originally written as a romantic ballad, but when James, Cordell and Gentry recorded a quick demo, they made the song faster. Tommy James later wrote: "Ritchie and Bo originally wrote the song as a mid-tempo ballad. I said no way and started speeding it up.... I.. put on a nasally, almost juvenile-sounding lead vocal, and without realizing it, we invented "bubblegum" music." They played the song to Levy, who approved of it, and it was then given a proper recording.

== Recording ==
The recording was produced by Ritchie Cordell and Bo Gentry. Bo had been going out with Joanna (now Johana) and called to let her know he just wrote a song "about us", then sang it to her very romantically by phone. Bo did not publicize that he wrote this song, possibly for contractual reasons. At the time, Bo was living in an apartment on the block where all reputable NYC rock music writers lived. "I Think We're Alone Now" was recorded on December 24, 1966, so that the song could be released in the new year. Both the song's demo and master recording were taped at Kama Sutra's Allegro Sound Studios, located in the basement of the Brill Building in New York City. Like many early Tommy James and the Shondells releases, only band members Tommy James and Eddie Gray were featured on the record, with the rest of the band providing background vocals. Studio musicians were used as the rest of the rhythm section to back up the Shondells. These musicians include Artie Butler playing Ondioline electric keyboard, Al Gorgoni on guitar, Joe Macho on bass, Paul Griffin on piano, and Bobby Gregg on drums.

They recorded the bass and drums first, and the rest then layered onto the recording. They also made the choruses quieter so that the verses became much more prominent. This was the first time that they recorded this way, a process they would replicate in many other later records to produce their signature sound. The version that James and the Shondells originally performed uses hard-driving arrangements for its two verses, both fiercely performed so as to convey a sense of urgency. However, the refrain (performed twice) is almost whispered and indeed followed by a sound effect of crickets chirping, giving an atmosphere of forbidden activities that are being deliberately kept hidden. The fade-out uses the lyrics of the refrain, but this time, the hard-driving arrangements are resumed.

== Release ==
"I Think We're Alone Now" was a 1967 hit song for Tommy James and the Shondells, reaching number 4 on the Billboard Hot 100 chart during a 17-week stay. Rock critic Lester Bangs called the single "the bubblegum apotheosis".

"I Think We're Alone Now" stands out as one of James's most successful recordings. It was featured in the horror film Mother's Day (1980), the science-fiction thriller 10 Cloverfield Lane (2016) and the first and finale episode of the fantasy web series The Umbrella Academy (2019 and 2024).

== Charts ==
=== Weekly charts ===
Chart (1967–68)	Peak position
Canada Top Singles (RPM)	6
New Zealand (Listener)	7
South Africa (Springbok)	8
US Billboard Hot 100	4
US Cash Box Top 100	3

=== Year-end charts ===
Chart (1967)	Rank
Canada RPM 100	26
US Billboard Hot 100	12
US Cash Box Top 100	12

== Lene Lovich version ==
"I Think We're Alone Now"

Single by Lene Lovich

from the album Stateless
- B-side: "Lucky Number"
- Released: July 1978
- Recorded: 1978
- Genre: New wave
- Length: 2:45
- Label: Stiff
- Songwriter: Ritchie Cordell
- Producer: Les Chappell

Lene Lovich singles chronology
"I Think We're Alone Now" (1978)	"Lucky Number" (1979)

In 1978, the American singer Lene Lovich recorded a cover version of "I Think We're Alone Now". Her version was originally released with her hit song "Lucky Number" as a B-side. Lovich recorded the song after contacting the radio presenter Charlie Gillett, who helped her get signed by Dave Robinson of Stiff Records. Robinson liked the record and immediately proposed it to be released as a single. However, her song "Lucky Number" gained so much more attention that it was later re-released as a lead single, at which it peaked at number 3 on the UK Singles Chart.

"I Think We're Alone Now" appeared on Lovich's 1978 debut album, Stateless, and she would later record the song in other languages, including German and Japanese.

=== Track listings and formats ===
- 7" single (UK)
1. "I Think We're Alone Now" – 2:45
2. "Lucky Number" – 2:20
- 7" single (UK) (Version 2)
1. "I Think We're Alone Now" (Japanese Version) – 2:45
2. "Lucky Number" – 2:20

== Tiffany version ==
"I Think We're Alone Now"

Single by Tiffany

from the album Tiffany
- B-side: "No Rules"
- Released: August 16, 1987
- Recorded: 1987
- Genre: Hi-NRG; dance-pop; teen pop
- Length: 3:48 (original version) 4:25 (single remix)
- Label: MCA
- Songwriter: Ritchie Cordell
- Producer: George Tobin

Tiffany singles chronology
"Danny" (1987)	"I Think We're Alone Now" (1987)	"Could've Been" (1988)

Music video
- "I Think We're Alone Now" on YouTube

Professional ratings
Review scores
Source	Rating
Number One	3/5 stars

=== Background ===
"I Think We’re Alone Now″ was re-popularized when American pop singer Tiffany covered the song when she was 15 for her debut album, Tiffany, which was released on August 16, 1987, on the MCA Records label. When George Tobin, Tiffany's manager and producer, gave her the cassette of the original version by Tommy James & the Shondells, Tiffany hated the idea of recording a version of her own, mostly because she thought the song was neither modern enough nor hip enough. According to Tiffany, she also did not know that the song is about the prohibition of teenage sex. The producers then remade the song as a dance track, and when Tiffany played it to friends, they started to dance. Tiffany returned the next day to record the song in around four takes.

Tiffany also recorded "I Think We're Alone Now", but in a different arrangement, for her sixth album and her second as an indie artist, Dust Off and Dance, which became her only electronica album. It was released in 2005. For the 2007 compilation album I Think We're Alone Now: 80s Hits and More, her vocals were re-recorded, using the remixed 1987 backing track as a guide. Her earlier version is referenced in the alternative group Weezer's song "Heart Songs" on the band's 2008 Red Album.

In 2019, Tiffany re-recorded the song with a heavier, more guitar-driven sound and released it online.

It was used in Ted and its sequel, season 1 and season 4 of The Umbrella Academy, in season 1 of Future Man, by IKEA for their 2023 holiday ads, the 2025 film Pillion, in season 3 of Yellowjackets, featured in Fear Street: Prom Queen and season 5 of Stranger Things.

=== Chart performance ===
"I Think We're Alone Now" was Tiffany's biggest hit. Her version of the song spent two weeks at number one on the Billboard Hot 100 chart and three weeks at number one on the UK Singles Chart. It charted first on August 28, 1987.

"I Think We're Alone Now" was not the first single from Tiffany's debut album. The first single was "Danny", but radio started picking up "I Think We're Alone Now", another selection on the album. It was the 18th-highest-selling single for 1987 in the United States, the fifth-best-selling song of 1988 in the United Kingdom (and the country's biggest-selling song of 1988 by an American artist), and the 32nd-highest-selling single in Australia for 1988. In Canada, it reached No. 1 a week after another cover of a Tommy James and the Shondells' song, "Mony Mony", which also reached No. 1.

=== Critical reception ===
Max Bell from Number One wrote, "This chestnut is more interesting if only because Tiffany is a 16-year old from Oklahoma who looks like being America's first teenage singing star in years. This was Number One over the pond and it's obvious Tiffany has the credentials to become a countrified threat to Madonna's crown. She'll be Miss America 1988! A celebrity is born!" Sue Dando from Smash Hits deemed the song "average" and described it as a "rather wretched thing" with "so slightly raunchy female vocals and insubstantial pop toons that are infuriatingly catchy". Lawrence Donegan of Record Mirror stated that Tiffany's number-one hit on the US charts "proves you don't need to be beautiful and talented to get on in this world". James Hamilton of the same magazine called the song a "flurryingly energetic (0-)130 1/2-0 bpm revival".

=== Music video ===
The accompanying music video for "I Think We're Alone Now" was directed entirely by Tobin, and shot in numerous shopping malls in Utah, which echoed the way her early career had been promoted: Fashion Place Mall (Murray, Utah), Crossroads Plaza Mall (Salt Lake City, Utah), 49th Street Galleria (Murray, Utah) and Ogden City Mall (Ogden, Utah). Elements of the video were filmed in the now demolished Bull Ring Centre in Birmingham, UK. The video was featured in the 2012 film Ted and the song was also on the soundtrack and appears in its sequel.

In 2019, a new video directed by Marc Trojanowski, featuring the re-recorded 2019 version of the song and filmed in various locations around Los Angeles, was released online.

=== Parody ===
In 1988, "Weird Al" Yankovic released a parody of Tiffany's version of the song, titled "I Think I'm a Clone Now" on his album Even Worse.

=== Track listings and formats ===
- 7-inch/CD single
1. "I Think We're Alone Now" – 3:47
2. "No Rules" – 4:05
- 12-inch vinyl single
1. "I Think We're Alone Now" (extended version) – 6:35
2. "I Think We're Alone Now" (single version) – 4:25
3. "I Think We're Alone Now" (dub version) – 6:35

=== Charts ===
==== Weekly charts ====
Chart (1987–1988)	Peak position
Australia (Kent Music Report)	13
Austria (Ö3 Austria Top 40)	24
Belgium (Ultratop 50 Flanders)	2
Canada (The Record)	4
Canada Top Singles (RPM)	1
Denmark (IFPI)	2
Europe (Eurochart Hot 100)	2
European Airplay (Music & Media)	3
Finland (Suomen virallinen lista)	18
France (SNEP)	9
Iceland (Íslenski Listinn Topp 10)	10
Ireland (IRMA)	1
Italy (Musica e dischi)	7
Italy Airplay (Music & Media)	2
Netherlands (Dutch Top 40)	2
Netherlands (Single Top 100)	2
New Zealand (Recorded Music NZ)	1
Norway (VG-lista)	3
Panama (UPI)	1
Portugal (AFP)	2
South Africa (Springbok Radio)	1
Sweden (Trackslistan)	9
Switzerland (Schweizer Hitparade)	10
UK Singles (Official Charts)	1
US Adult Contemporary (Billboard)	38
US Billboard Hot 100	1
US Dance Club Songs (Billboard)	26
West Germany (GfK)	14
Zimbabwe (ZIMA)	2

Weekly chart performance
Chart (2026)	Peak position
Lithuania Airplay (TopHit)	52
UK Singles Chart	26

==== Year-end charts ====
Chart (1987)	Rank
Canada Top Singles (RPM)	23
US Billboard Hot 100	18
US Cash Box Top 100	32

Chart (1988)	Rank
Australia (Kent Music Report)	31
Belgium (Ultratop 50 Flanders)	19
Canada Top Singles (RPM)	76
Europe (Eurochart Hot 100)	18
Netherlands (Dutch Top 40)	20
Netherlands (Single Top 100)	25
New Zealand (RIANZ)	26
South Africa (Springbok Radio)	6
UK Singles (OCC)	5
West Germany (Media Control)	58

=== Certifications ===
Region	Certification	Certified units/sales
Canada (Music Canada)	Gold	50,000^{^}
New Zealand (RMNZ)	Platinum	30,000^{‡}
United Kingdom (BPI)	2× Platinum	1,200,000^{‡}
United States (RIAA)	Platinum	1,000,000^{‡}
^{^} Shipments figures based on certification alone.^{‡} Sales+streaming figures based on certification alone.

== Snuff version ==
In 1989, London mod/punk outfit Snuff rendered a stripped-down and breakneck-speed version, clocking in at a vigorous 1:50, on their debut John Peel session recorded 15 January 1989 and broadcast 30 January 1989. It was later released on the Snuff Said... album of November 1989 on Workers Playtime records, and became a fan favourite and indie disco hit.

In October 2003, Snuff also released a breathless version of Girls Aloud's "Sound of the Underground" on their covers album, Greasy Hair Makes Money.

== Girls Aloud version ==
"I Think We're Alone Now"

Single by Girls Aloud

from the album The Sound of Girls Aloud: The Greatest Hits
- B-side: "Why Do It?"; "Jingle Bell Rock"
- Released: December 18, 2006
- Recorded: September 2006
- Genre: Dance-pop; electropop
- Length: 3:42 (single mix); 3:18 (album version)
- Label: Fascination
- Songwriter: Ritchie Cordell
- Producers: Brian Higgins; Xenomania

Girls Aloud singles chronology
"Something Kinda Ooooh" (2006)	"I Think We're Alone Now" (2006)	"Walk This Way" (2007)

Music video
- "I Think We're Alone Now" on YouTube

=== Background ===
In 2006, the British-Irish all-female pop group Girls Aloud recorded a cover version of "I Think We're Alone Now" for their greatest hits album The Sound of Girls Aloud and the soundtrack of It's a Boy Girl Thing. Girls Aloud's version was produced by Brian Higgins and his production team Xenomania. The song was recorded just days before the group's greatest hits was sent to be manufactured. Following a single remix, "I Think We're Alone Now" was released as a contender for the Christmas number one. It reached the top five on the UK Singles Chart.

The music video, inspired by heist films, features Girls Aloud robbing a Las Vegas casino. "I Think We're Alone Now" was promoted through various live appearances and was featured on 2007's The Greatest Hits Tour. The track was criticised and labelled "pointless" by contemporary music critics.

=== Release ===
Until three days before the greatest hits was manufactured, Girls Aloud was set to record a cover of Irene Cara's "What A Feeling", which they had performed on their Chemistry Tour. But members of Girls Aloud had called their record label on a Friday afternoon to say that they would rather record "I Think We're Alone Now"; the group recorded the song the following morning, and the album was mastered on Monday, three days afterwards. The album version was drastically reworked for the single release, due to the initial version having been so hastily recorded. Higgins said that "Xenomania used the only idea they could think of, which was to make the song sound like 'Something Kinda Ooooh.'" The single features an alternative vocal arrangement and an entirely new backing track. Later pressings of the greatest hits include the single version of "I Think We're Alone Now".

The song was released on December 18, 2006. It was available on two CD single formats and as a digital download. The first disc included a previously unreleased track entitled "Why Do It?", co-written by Girls Aloud. The second CD format features a number of remixes, as well as a cover of the Christmas classic "Jingle Bell Rock". Girls Aloud's cover of "Jingle Bell Rock" was originally featured on the Christmas bonus disc that came with the limited edition of 2005's Chemistry. The artwork for the second disc features Girls Aloud draped over a Fender guitar amplifier.

Girls Aloud's version of "I Think We're Alone Now" appears on the soundtrack to the film It's a Boy Girl Thing (2006), starring Samaire Armstrong and Kevin Zegers.

=== Critical response ===
Girls Aloud's cover of the song was widely slated by music critics. An unidentified staff writer at WalesOnline described it as "cheap, obnoxious, totally pointless and, destined to be loved only by people too out of their heads on Christmas spirit to know any better". Adam Burling of musicOMH exclaimed, "Christmas does funny things to people. Even pop groups as reliably excellent at singles as Girls Aloud toss out pointless, lazy covers in a ruthless attempt to snare that coveted seasonal chart-topper from The X Factor's clutches." A BBC Music review of The Sound of Girls Aloud chose to "ignore the Xmas party cover". Yahoo! Music stated "the karaoke rendition[s] of [...] Tiffany's 'I Think We're Alone Now' really drag this collection down". John Murphy of musicOMH unfavorably contrasted the cover with Tiffany's rendition, saying the former "actually does the impossible by making Tiffany's version sound good".

=== Chart performance ===
The single debuted at number 50 on the UK Singles Chart a week prior to its physical release, due to download sales. The following week, "I Think We're Alone Now" peaked at number 4 on the Christmas chart, being beaten by Leona Lewis' "A Moment Like This". The song slipped to number 7 in its second week. It spent a total of seven weeks in the top 75. The song also peaked at number 11 on the Irish Singles Chart and spent six weeks in Ireland's top 50. As their 17th best selling single it has sold a total of 85,000 copies.

=== Music video ===
The video, directed by Alex Hemming and Nick Collett, is based, as stated above, on films like Ocean's 11 and Casino. During the video, the group attempt to rob a Las Vegas casino.

Three different endings to the video were shot. The first shows the girls getting caught and tied up after opening a box full of money in the casino's safe; the second features Kimberley Walsh (with her back to the camera) removing her clothes in front of casino owners, causing them to faint; and the third features the girls playing with the money. 3 customers were allowed to vote on their favourite ending from November 8 to November 15, 2006. This last ending won the vote, despite the version with Kimberley stripping being uploaded to the internet. In March 2007, all versions of the video were made available to download on iTunes, though in the UK Store only.

=== Track listings and formats ===
These are the formats and track listings of major single releases of "I Think We're Alone Now".

UK CD1 (1714586)

1. "I Think We're Alone Now" (single mix) – 3:42
2. "Why Do It?" (Girls Aloud, Miranda Cooper, Brian Higgins, Nick Coler) – 2:53

UK CD2 (1714587)

1. "I Think We're Alone Now" (single mix) – 3:42
2. "I Think We're Alone Now" (Uniting Nations Remix) – 6:18
3. "I Think We're Alone Now" (Tony Lamezma Baubletastic Remix) – 5:32
4. "Jingle Bell Rock" (Joe Beal, Jim Boothe) – 1:59
5. "I Think We're Alone Now" (video) – 3:37

The Singles Boxset (CD14)

1. "I Think We're Alone Now" (single mix) – 3:42
2. "Why Do It?" – 2:53
3. "I Think We're Alone Now" (Uniting Nations Remix) – 6:18
4. "I Think We're Alone Now" (Tony Lamezma Baubletastic Remix) – 5:32
5. "Jingle Bell Rock" – 1:59
6. "I Think We're Alone Now" (Alternative Mix)
7. "I Think We're Alone Now" (Co-Stars Epic Club Mix)
8. "I Think We're Alone Now" (Flip & Fill Remix)
9. "I Think We're Alone Now" (video) – 3:37

Digital EP

1. "I Think We're Alone Now" (Promo And Album mix) – 3:42
2. "Why Do It?" – 2:53
3. "I Think We're Alone Now" (Uniting Nations remix) – 6:10
4. "I Think We're Alone Now" (Tony Lamezma Baubletastic remix) – 5:29
5. "Jingle Bell Rock" – 1:56
6. "I Think We're Alone Now" (Alternative Mix) – 5:30
7. "I Think We're Alone Now" (Co-Stars Epic Club Mix) – 7:00
8. "I Think We're Alone Now" (Flip & Fill Remix) – 6:03

=== Credits and personnel ===
- Guitar: Nick Coler
- Keyboards: Brian Higgins, Tim Powell, Toby Scott
- Mastering: Dick Beetham for 360 Mastering
- Mixing: Brian Higgins, Tim Powell
- Production: Brian Higgins, Xenomania
- Programming: Miranda Cooper, Brian Higgins, Tim Powell, Paul Woods
- Vocals: Girls Aloud
- Published by Warner/Chappell Music and Xenomania Music

=== Charts ===
==== Weekly charts ====
Chart (2006–2007)	Peak position
Europe (Eurochart Hot 100)	15
Romania (Romanian Top 100)	34
Ireland (IRMA)	11
Scottish Singles Sales (Official Charts)	3
UK Singles (Official Charts)	4

==== Year-end chart ====
Chart (2006)	Rank
UK Singles (OCC)	196

== Billie Joe Armstrong version ==
"I Think We're Alone Now"

Single by Billie Joe Armstrong

from the album No Fun Mondays
- Released: April 17, 2020
- Recorded: March 2020
- Genre: Punk rock
- Length: 2:14
- Label: Reprise Records
- Songwriter: Ritchie Cordell
- Producer: Billie Joe Armstrong

Billie Joe Armstrong singles chronology
"Long Time Gone" (2013)	"I Think We're Alone Now" (2020)	"Manic Monday" (2020)

Music video
- "I Think We're Alone Now" on YouTube

Green Day vocalist and guitarist Billie Joe Armstrong released a cover of "I Think We're Alone Now" on March 23, 2020, to the official Green Day YouTube channel. In April the performance was also shared on The Late Late Show with James Corden, along with an interview with Armstrong. This version, according to Armstrong, was recorded in his bedroom at his home in California and was released during the COVID-19 pandemic as an act of solidarity for those who were practicing social distancing and those in self-quarantine and was released as a single on April 17, 2020. The cover featured Armstrong's sons on bass and drums.

=== Track listings and formats ===
7"

1. "I Think We're Alone Now" – 2:14
2. "War Stories" – 2:42

Digital download

1. "I Think We're Alone Now" – 2:14

=== Weekly charts ===
Chart (2020)	Peak position
Canada Hot AC (Billboard)	43
Canada Rock (Billboard)	47
US Adult Contemporary (Billboard)	24
US Adult Pop Airplay (Billboard)	12
US Hot Rock & Alternative Songs (Billboard)	7
US Rock & Alternative Airplay (Billboard)	37

=== Year-end charts ===
Chart (2020)	Position
US Adult Top 40 (Billboard)	39
US Hot Rock & Alternative Songs (Billboard)	78
