= Tiffany Darwish =

American singer (born 1971)

Tiffany
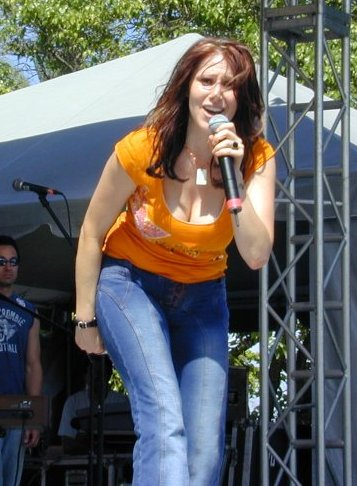
- Tiffany performing at Gulfstream Park in Hallandale Beach, Florida, 2003
- Born: Tiffany Renee Darwish; October 2, 1971 (age 55); Norwalk, California, U.S.
- Other name: Tiffany
- Occupations: Singer; songwriter; actress
- Years active: 1981–1995; 1998–present
- Spouses: Bulmaro Garcia (m. 1992; div. 2003); Ben George (m. 2004; div. 2018)
- Children: 1
- Musical career
- Genres: Pop; dance-pop; pop rock; country
- Labels: MCA; Azil; Eureka; Backroom; Water Music; 10 Spot; Only the Girl; Go On Then
- Website: tiffanytunes.com

Tiffany Renee Darwish (born October 2, 1971), known mononymously as Tiffany, is an American pop singer. Her 1987 cover of the Tommy James and the Shondells song "I Think We're Alone Now" spent two weeks at No. 1 on the Billboard Hot 100 chart, and was released as the second single from her debut studio album, Tiffany.

Her singles "Could've Been" and "I Saw Him Standing There", a cover version of the Beatles' "I Saw Her Standing There" were soon released. The former claimed the No. 1 position on the Billboard Hot 100. Thanks to an original mall tour, "The Beautiful You: Celebrating The Good Life Shopping Mall Tour '87", Tiffany found commercial success; and both her singles and the album peaked at No. 1 on the Billboard Hot 100 and Billboard 200 charts, respectively.

Tiffany's second studio album, Hold an Old Friend's Hand, featured the Top 10 single "All This Time" and charted on the Billboard 200 in 1988. It achieved platinum status, although it did not replicate the success of her debut album. Two additional releases from Tiffany, New Inside (1990) and the Asia-exclusive Dreams Never Die (1993), both failed to rekindle significant interest. She returned in 2000 with her first studio album in six years, The Color of Silence. Although the album received some minor critical success, it also failed to achieve any significant standing. Since 2000, Tiffany has recorded six additional studio albums, as well as two albums of 1980s cover songs, and she continues to tour.

Outside of music, Tiffany posed nude in Playboy and has guest-starred on several reality television shows, including Celebrity Fit Club, Australia's version of I'm a Celebrity...Get Me Out of Here! and Hulk Hogan's Celebrity Championship Wrestling, and has acted in a handful of horror and science fiction films, including Necrosis (2009), Mega Piranha (2010), and Mega Python vs. Gatoroid (2011).

== Early life ==
Tiffany Renee Darwish was born on October 2, 1971 in Norwalk, California, which is east of Los Angeles, (Note: Some sources erroneously state Darwish was born in Oklahoma.) to Janie Wilson and James Robert Darwish, who divorced when she was 14 months old.

Regarding her background, Tiffany said, "Most of my family is from Dearborn. They're from Lebanon. So, I'm Lebanese. A little village. Because of Ford, everybody kind of moved here. Big Dearborn community... all my family." She is of Lebanese descent on her father's side and German descent on her mother's side.

Tiffany began singing at age four when she learned the words to the Tanya Tucker song "Delta Dawn". After her parents' divorce, she lived with her father and went to Norwalk High School in Norwalk as a freshman and sophomore. Then she attended Norwalk's Leffingwell Christian High School.

== Music career ==
=== 1980s ===
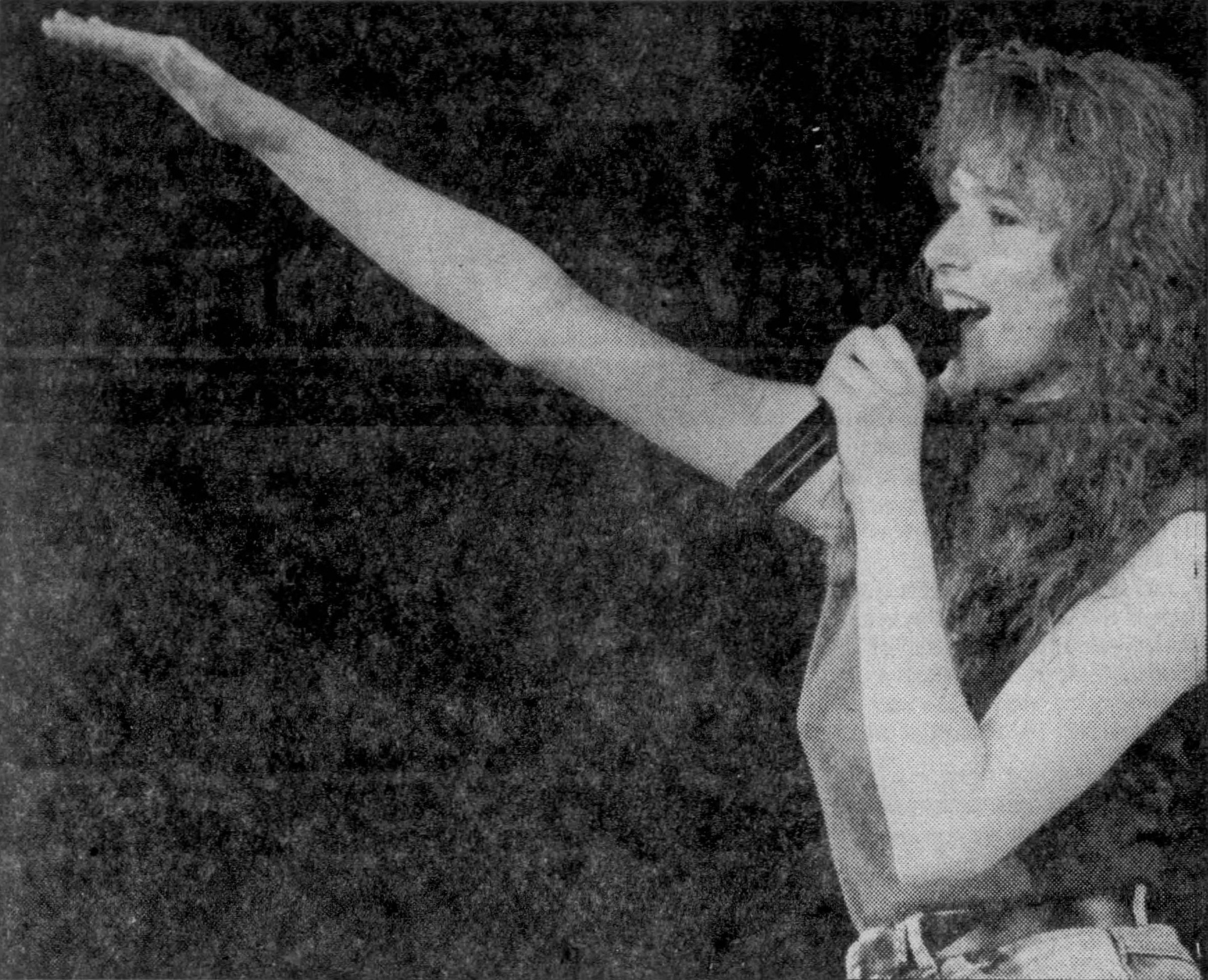
Tiffany performing in 1988

In 1981, Tiffany debuted with country music singer Jack Reeves at a country and western venue, Narods, in Chino, California. She passed a hat among the crowd afterwards, and collected $235 in what were her first career earnings. When Tiffany was singing at the Palomino Club, she was discovered by Hoyt Axton and his mother Mae Axton. Mae took her to sing in Nashville, Tennessee, where she performed on WSMV's The Ralph Emery Show, singing Juice Newton's "Queen of Hearts" and Tammy Wynette's "Your Good Girl's Gonna Go Bad".

In 1984, Tiffany signed a recording contract with George Tobin after he heard her sing on a demo tape. In 1985, she appeared on Star Search with Ed McMahon, where she finished in second place overall. In 1986, she signed a contract that gave Tobin total control over her career, recorded her debut studio album and was signed to an MCA contract. The album, Tiffany, was released in 1987, but the first single she released from it, "Danny", failed to chart. Following the failure of "Danny", Tobin sent Tiffany on a nationwide tour of shopping malls, The Beautiful You: Celebrating the Good Life Shopping Mall Tour '87. The tour began at the Bergen Mall in Paramus, New Jersey. Her second single, a cover of Tommy James and the Shondells' hit, "I Think We're Alone Now", became a number-one hit on the Billboard Hot 100 list. It remains her biggest hit.

Tiffany's ballad "Could've Been" also peaked at the No. 1 spot on the Billboard charts, in February 1988. Tiffany's modified version of the Beatles' "I Saw Her Standing There", retitled "I Saw Him Standing There", peaked at the No. 7 position on the Hot 100. "Feelings of Forever" also had chart success. Tiffany set a record for the youngest female artist to top the Billboard charts with a debut album. Later that year, she toured, with boy band New Kids on the Block as her opening act.

In 1988, at the peak of her popularity, Tiffany was embroiled in a conflict in which Tobin fought her mother and stepfather over control of her career and earnings. This led to a court fight in which Tiffany tried to have herself declared an emancipated minor. This was rejected by the court, but the judge did allow her to move out of her mother's home, and her grandmother (who sided with Tiffany during the trial) became her temporary guardian. In late 1988, Tiffany released her second studio album, Hold an Old Friend's Hand, which was less successful than her debut. Although it did not include any number-one hits, the song "All This Time" made the top 10.

Shortly after turning eighteen, Tiffany left Tobin's management and signed with Dick Scott and Kim Glover, who managed New Kids on the Block, by then a successful boy band.

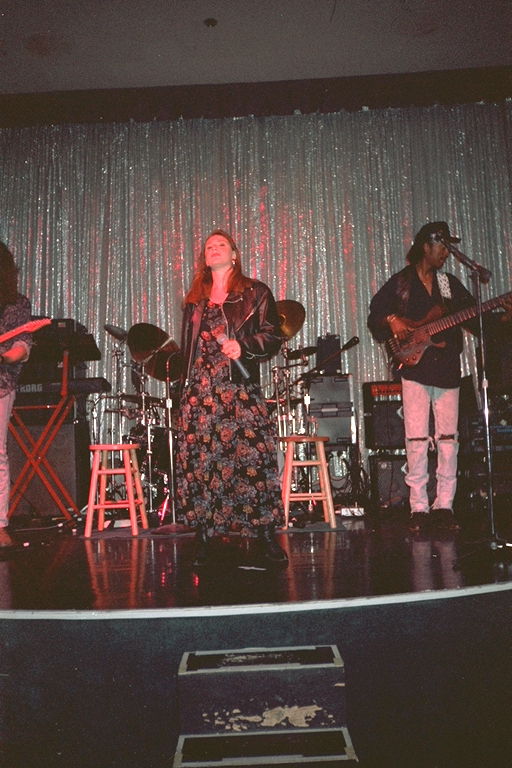
Tiffany performing at the Las Vegas Hilton, April 1993

=== 1990s ===
Tiffany's career suffered as musical tastes changed in the early 1990s, moving away from dance-pop and towards harder-edged rock and rap. Tiffany's popularity, however, remained strong in Asia, especially Hong Kong and Southeast Asia; in Hong Kong, her ballads received cover versions in Cantonese from Cantopop artists. Her third studio album, the urban-influenced New Inside (1990), received mixed reviews from music critics, and failed to chart, despite several TV appearances to promote it, including on the fantasy sitcom Out of This World. In 1991, Tiffany participated in the recording of the song "Voices That Care", which peaked at No. 11 on the Billboard Hot 100.

During a brief early 1990s comeback attempt, Tiffany reunited with Tobin on the album Dreams Never Die (1993), which spawned the singles "If Love is Blind" and "Can't You See". The album, mostly containing ballads, was released in Asian markets and was accompanied by a six-week tour of clubs, shopping malls and radio stations in Hong Kong, Singapore, Indonesia, the Philippines, and Malaysia; a US release was planned, but it never materialized. She headlined her own show at the Las Vegas Hilton in the summer of 1993, before breaking with Tobin once again.

In 1995, Tiffany moved to Nashville to develop her career as a songwriter, and to attempt a return as a country music artist. In 1998, she appeared on the U2 tribute album We Will Follow: A Tribute to U2 in a collaboration with Canadian industrial act Front Line Assembly performing "New Year's Day".

=== 2000s ===
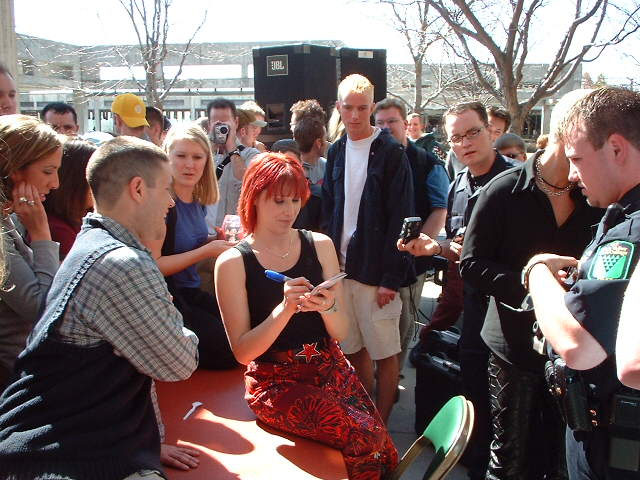
Tiffany signing autographs at the campus of Utah Valley University in Orem, March 2001

In 2000, Tiffany released her fifth studio album, The Color of Silence, which received favorable reviews. Billboard described it as "one of the best pop albums of the year" and the year's "biggest surprise". Her College Promotional Tour broke attendance records at most tour stops.

Tiffany posed nude for the April 2002 issue of Playboy. Tiffany stated in interviews that she explained to her nine-year-old son that it was no different from posing in Vogue or Elle, except that it showed more. She added years later that while she had no regrets about posing in Playboy, some of her family members disapproved because of how young her son was at the time.

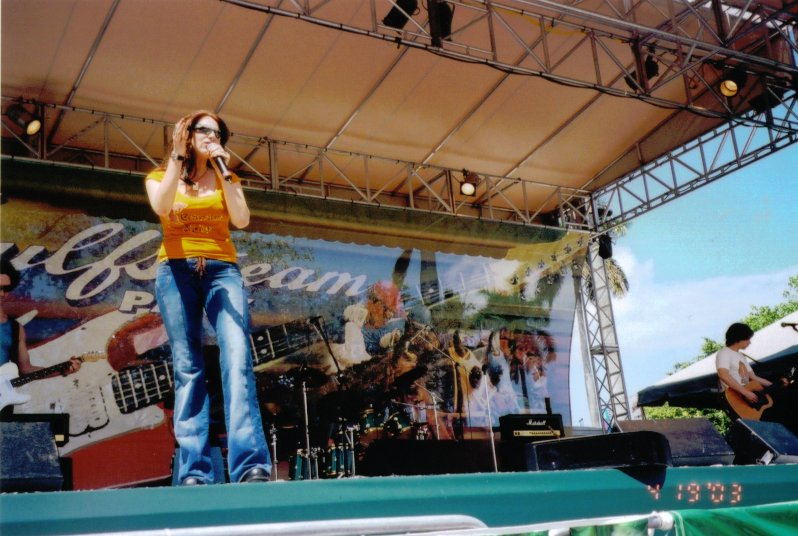
Tiffany performing at Gulfstream Park in Hallandale Beach, Florida, 2003

On April 2, 2005, Tiffany was featured on the British TV show Hit Me, Baby, One More Time, performing the Girls Aloud song "Love Machine" and securing a place in the show's finale. She also appeared on the US version of the show on June 2, 2005, losing to hip hop group Arrested Development. Tiffany released her sixth studio album Dust Off and Dance on CD Baby in May 2005, followed later as a digital release on iTunes. It was dedicated to her new husband, but recorded as a thank you to her fans (particularly her gay and European fanbase) for reminding her about the fun to be had with her career. The album consisted of Eurodance and Hi-NRG style songs. Singles from Dust Off and Dance, included "Ride It", "Fly", "Be with U Tonite", "Na Na Na", and "Artificial Girlfriend".

Tiffany toured with the album, which in September 2006 was nominated for six JPF Awards. She won for best dance song of the year for "Be with U Tonite" and best dance CD of the year on November 4, 2006. In 2007, Tiffany, who had begun to struggle with her weight, was cast for the fifth season of VH1's Celebrity Fit Club. The show premiered on April 22, 2007. During the show, the singer's weight started at 152 lb (69 kg) and finished with 124 lb (56 kg), a difference of 18.4%. In April 2007, Tiffany released a new album of cover material titled I Think We're Alone Now: '80s Hits and More on Cleopatra Records. The album features updated versions of her first three Top Ten hits from her debut album, as well as cover versions of songs from other artists of the 1980s.

Tiffany's music video for "I Think We're Alone Now" is featured in an episode of The Goldbergs, an episode of The Umbrella Academy, and the 2012 film Ted. Tiffany in 2007 signed a recording contract with 10 Spot Records, a new division of Water Music Records Group, distributed by Universal Music Group, and released a new album titled Just Me. The album contained all-new material in a singer-songwriter format à la her earlier album The Color of Silence (2000). The first single from the album, "Feels Like Love", was released on May 1, 2007.

In early August 2007, the dance single "Higher" began showing up online. On October 2, 2007 (Tiffany's 36th birthday), it debuted on the Billboard Hot Dance Club Play chart as the number-one breakout, her first Billboard chart appearance since 1989. From there, the single climbed the charts to No. 19. In March 2008, Tiffany released Mimi's Kitchen, an album limited to 500 copies and featuring rare demos from age three through the present. It was shipped to fans in a personalized package which also included autographed photos, two autographed CDs, and the Mimi's Kitchen demo collection. A small subset of the release also included Playboy T-shirts.

In late April 2008, a track with the same name as her 2005 dance album Dust Off and Dance became available for download on the Internet. The song consisted of Tiffany performing vocals for the dance team Hydra Productions; it is on their album Liquid. In early January 2009, the single reached number one on the Hot Club Play Breakout charts. In late July 2008, a new Tiffany dance song remixed by Dave Audé, "Just Another Day", was released on CD. It peaked at No. 28 on the U.S. Billboard Dance chart. On October 18, 2008, Tiffany appeared on the CMT reality show Hulk Hogan's Celebrity Championship Wrestling, and was eliminated in the first episode.

=== 2010s ===
On January 14, 2011, Tiffany released the single "Serpentine" on iTunes. The country song was taken from the soundtrack of the film Mega Python vs. Gatoroid, in which she also starred. Her album Rose Tattoo, released on March 1, 2011, was her first professional foray into country music. On April 22, 2011, it was announced that Tiffany would be teaming up with fellow 1980s pop music sensation Debbie Gibson for an upcoming summer concert tour titled Journey Through the 80's. When asked what material the pair would perform in the concerts, Tiffany said it would be a 1980s retrospective which in addition to their own material, would feature covers by Stevie Nicks, Guns N' Roses, and Reba McEntire.

In December 2012, having opened a clothing boutique of her own, Tiffany appeared on TLC's makeover reality show What Not to Wear. In January 2014, Tiffany became one of the eight stars competing in season three of Food Network's Rachael vs. Guy: Celebrity Cook-Off. She won an MVP bonus of $2,500 in the first week of the competition, and ultimately placed third.

Tiffany was a celebrity contestant in 2018 on the fourth season of the Australian version of I'm a Celebrity...Get Me Out of Here!, and became the first celebrity eliminated from the series after 16 days in the jungle. On September 21, 2018, Tiffany self-released her tenth studio album, Pieces of Me, via her own label, Go On Then Records. The next month her cover of Logan Lynn’s "Big City Now" was released as part of a multi-media double album titled My Movie Star produced by Lynn and Jay Mohr. In April 2019, Tiffany released an updated version of her hit "I Think We're Alone Now" that featured a rock and roll arrangement. On May 2, 2019, the Mixtape Tour commenced in Cincinnati, Ohio. The other performers on the tour were Salt-N-Pepa, Debbie Gibson, and Naughty by Nature with New Kids on the Block being billed as the headline performers.

Tiffany kicked off her 2019 solo tour on August 31, 2019, with a concert at Daybreak in South Jordan, Utah. The tour included nearly 50 dates at venues across the United States through March 2020. In October 2019, Tiffany was a featured guest on The Sam T. Blues Revue, the successor of The BluesMobile Radio Hour.

=== 2020s ===
In 2020, Tiffany performed a song that appears on the soundtrack of the movie Love, Guaranteed. She also released her first original Christmas single "Angels" on December 4 of the same year on streaming services. "Angels" was written and recorded at her home studio in Nashville, Tennessee with Mark Alberici and Margie Hauser. Tiffany said, "The song is about hope and missing family. In my more than 30-year career, I've never recorded an original Christmas song, but it just felt right. It's raw and real and that's what makes it special to me."

While struggling through a November 2021 live performance of "I Think We're Alone Now" in Melbourne, Florida, Tiffany yelled an expletive at the crowd. Once media outlets picked up the story, Tiffany's representative said that she had lost her voice and was frustrated with her performance. Tiffany then addressed the event herself, apologizing for her actions that she claimed were the result of a combination of voice loss, panic attack, and frustration.

Tiffany's eleventh studio album, Shadows, produced by Alberici, was released on November 25, 2022 via Deko Entertainment and Revolt Artist Management.

In 2025, her 1987 cover of "I Think We're Alone Now" was featured in the third episode of the fifth season of Stranger Things. In December 2025, the song entered the UK Official Streaming Chart, peaking at number 99.

== Film and television career ==
Tiffany's first acting job was providing the voice of Judy Jetson on Jetsons: The Movie, which was released in 1990. She also contributed three songs to the soundtrack including the single "I Always Thought I'd See You Again" and the main song "You and Me". Some controversy resulted from the fact that Janet Waldo, who had voiced the character in all previous Jetsons material, had all of her recorded dialogue in the movie replaced because studio executives thought Tiffany would attract a younger audience. The film, however, was a box-office bomb. In April 2008, Tiffany starred in a national commercial campaign for AT&T titled "Paradise by the GoPhone Light" for AT&T's GoPhone, which featured the singer Meat Loaf. The ad, which parodies his "Paradise by the Dashboard Light" was released in two versions, an extended music video version and a short commercial edit.

Also in April 2008, Tiffany made a cameo appearance on the sitcom How I Met Your Mother in the episode "Sandcastles in the Sand". She played herself as a backing vocalist in the 1980s-inspired music video by a fictional teen Canadian pop star who was inspired by real-life singers like Tiffany making a career out of performing in malls. Tiffany starred in the 2008 short film The Isolationist, which was screened at several film festivals. Her character, Barbara Newman, is a sexually-aggressive woman unwilling to let a co-worker enjoy some alone time. In 2009, she completed work on her first feature film, Necrosis, which was released internationally as Blood Snow. Necrosis is an independent psychological thriller in which she starred alongside James Kyson and George Stults. In the film, she plays Karen, a fun-loving adrenaline junkie who takes matters into her own hands after a blizzard traps her and her friends in a cabin, when paranoia gets the best of them. Necrosis premiered at the 2009 Cannes Film Festival. Tiffany's musical contemporary, Debbie Gibson, had her film Mega Shark Versus Giant Octopus premiere at Cannes, as well. Tiffany also starred in a film from The Asylum, the mockbuster Mega Piranha, directed by Eric Forsberg, which also starred Barry Williams.

Tiffany and Gibson starred together in a Syfy original movie Mega Python vs. Gatoroid, which aired January 29, 2011. The movie featured a protracted catfight between Tiffany and Gibson. The 2008 documentary I Think We're Alone Now is about two fans of Tiffany who both claim to be in love with Tiffany and have been labeled "stalkers" by the media. While Tiffany did not voluntarily participate in the production, she does appear in the film.

In 2011, Tiffany filmed an episode of the Biography Channel TV series Celebrity Close Calls. On the episode first broadcast July 7, 2013, of the reality TV series Celebrity Wife Swap, she traded places with actress/singer Nia Peeples. Tiffany was the subject in 2013 of the Season 10 premiere episode of What Not To Wear on TLC. Later that year she starred in a Miracle Whip commercial alongside other celebrities, including Wynonna Judd, Lance Bass, Susan Boyle, and the Village People. In 2018, Tiffany competed in the Australian version of I'm a Celebrity... Get Me Out of Here, being the first eliminated. In 2024, Tiffany appeared as Eiffel Tower on the fifth series of the UK edition of The Masked Singer. She finished fourth, narrowly missing out on a place in the finals.

== Personal life ==
Tiffany was married to makeup artist Bulmaro Garcia from 1992 until 2003, with whom she had a son in 1992. Garcia died in 2018.

Tiffany married British businessman Ben George in 2004. During the writing process of 2018's Pieces of Me, the couple agreed to separate and have divorced.

== Discography ==
Studio albums

- Tiffany (1987)
- Hold an Old Friend's Hand (1988)
- New Inside (1990)
- Dreams Never Die (1993)
- The Color of Silence (2000)
- Dust Off and Dance (2005)
- Just Me (2007)
- Rose Tattoo (2011)
- A Million Miles (2016)
- Pieces of Me (2018)
- Shadows (2022)

== Filmography ==
=== Film ===
Year	Title	Role	Notes
1989	Hanna-Barbera's 50th: A Yabba Dabba Doo Celebration	Herself	TV movie
1990	Jetsons: The Movie	Judy Jetson (voice)	
2004	Death and Texas	National Anthem Singer	
2008	The Isolationist	Barbara	Short
2009	Necrosis	Karen	
2010	Mega Piranha	Sarah Monroe	TV movie
2011	Mega Python vs. Gatoroid	Terry O'Hara	TV movie
2015	Ted 2	Herself	
2024	The Twisters	Dr. Janet Evans	

=== Television ===
Year	Legacy	Role	Notes
1987	American Bandstand	Herself	Episode: "Episode #31.6"
1988	The Roxy	Herself	Episode: "Episode #1.32"
1988	Entertainment USA	Herself	Episode: "Episode #8.1"
1988-89	Top of the Pops	Herself	Recurring Performer: Season 25, Guest Performer: Season 26
1989	MMC	Herself	Episode: "Music Day"
1989	House of Style	Herself	Episode: "Fall '89"
1990	Out of this World	Tiffani	Episode: "I Want My Evie TV"
2000	Behind the Music	Herself	Episode: "Teen Idols"
2000-02	Where Are They Now?	Herself	Guest Cast: Season 2-3
2001	I Love 1980's	Herself	Episode: "I Love 1988"
2001	Top Ten	Herself	Episode: "Pop Princesses"
2001	The Test	Herself/Panelist	Episode: "The Good Neighbor Test"
2001-02	E! True Hollywood Story	Herself	Guest Cast: Season 5-6
2002	I Love the '80s	Herself	Recurring Guest
2002	That '80s Show	Candy	Episode: "Punk Club"
2003	The Greatest	Herself	Episode: "50 Greatest Teen Idols"
2003	Star Dates	Herself	Episode: "Tiffany"
2005	Hit Me, Baby, One More Time	Herself	Main Cast
2006	Gylne tider	Herself	Episode: "Episode #3.2"
2007	100 Greatest Teen Stars	Herself	Episode: "Hour 4"
2007	Celebrity Fit Club	Herself/Contestant	Main Cast: Season 5
2008	How I Met Your Mother	Catholic School Girl	Episode: "Sandcastles in the Sand"
2008	The Young and the Restless	Christmas Caroler	Episode: "Episode #1.9047"
2008	Rock & A Hard Place	Herself	Episode: "Tiffany Vs Berlin"
2008	Hulk Hogan's Celebrity Championship Wrestling	Herself	Main Cast
2009	Lawrence Leung's Choose Your Own Adventure	Herself	Episode: "Find Love"
2010	Catch 21	Herself/Contestant	Episode: "Music Icons"
2011	Food Network Challenge	Herself/Judge	Episode: "Awesome 80's Cakes"
2011	Celebrity Close Calls	Herself	Episode: "Niki Taylor/Gary Busey/Tiffany"
2012	Celebrity Ghost Stories	Herself	Episode: "Tiffany/Tony Plana/Morgan Brittany"
2013	What Not to Wear	Herself	Episode: "Tiffany"
2013	Celebrity Wife Swap	Herself	Episode: "Nia Peeples/Tiffany"
2013	Ask This Old House	Herself	Episode: "Preparing for Severe Weather"
2013	Johnny Dynamo	Herself	Episode: "Just Say Yes"
2014	Rachael vs. Guy: Celebrity Cook-Off	Herself	Main Cast: Season 3
2016	Mystery Diners	Herself	Episode: "Crooked Contest"
2018	I'm a Celebrity...Get Me Out of Here!	Herself/Contestant	Contestant: Season 4
2018	Jeremy Vine	Herself/Panelist	Episode: "Episode #1.17"
2018-19	From the Mouths of Babes	Herself	Recurring Guest: Season 3
2019	Robot Chicken	Bambi's Mother/Cheetah (voice)	Episode: "Spike Fraser in: Should I Happen to Back Into a Horse"
2024	The Masked Singer	Herself/Eiffel Tower	Contestant: Season 5
