= PC Quest =

PC Quest may refer to:

- pc Quest (band), a pop music group in the 1990s from Oklahoma
  - pc Quest (album), the 1991 self-titled first album by pc Quest
- PCQuest (magazine), a technology publication based in New Delhi, India
