= UOB Innovation Hub =

Building at Nanyang Technological University, Singapore

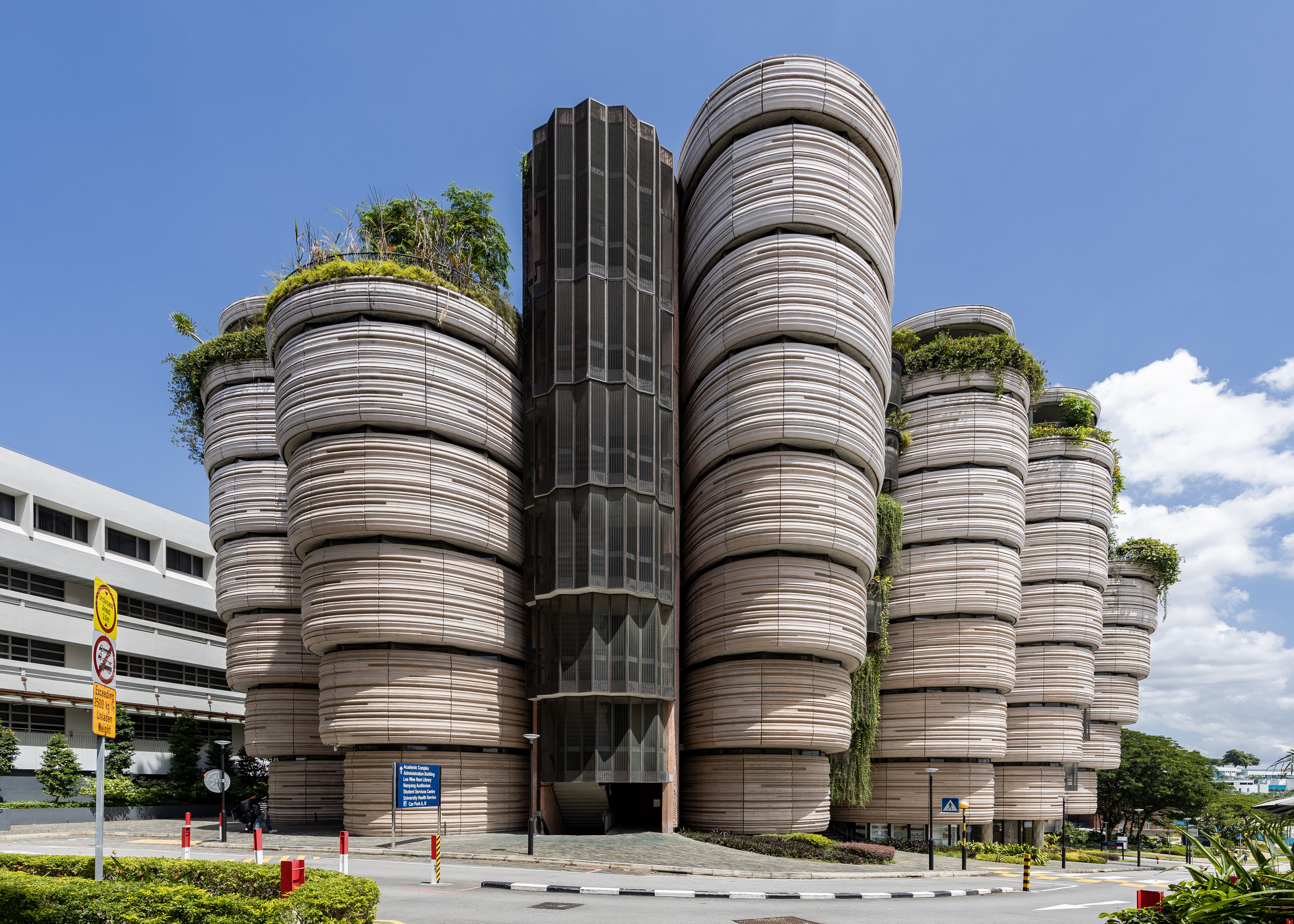
- Exterior of the building
- Former names: The Hive, Learning Hub
- Alternative names: Learning Hub South

General information
- Status: Completed
- Location: Nanyang Technological University, Jurong West, Singapore, 52 Nanyang Avenue, Singapore 639816
- Coordinates: 1.343212°N 103.682586°E
- Completed: 2015
- Opening: March 2015
- Inaugurated: 20 October 2015
- Renovated: 2026 (partial conversion to incubation space)
- Cost: S$45 million
- Owner: Nanyang Technological University

Technical details
- Floor count: 8
- Floor area: 14,000 m^{2} (150,000 sq ft)

Design and construction
- Architects: Heatherwick Studio (design); CPG Consultants (architect of record)
- Awards: BCA Green Mark Platinum

The UOB Innovation Hub, known until March 2026 as The Hive and also called the Learning Hub or Learning Hub South, is an eight-storey teaching building at Nanyang Technological University (NTU) in Singapore. Designed by the British designer Thomas Heatherwick and completed in 2015 at a cost of S$45 million, it is made up of twelve tapering towers of rounded classrooms arranged around a central atrium. Its appearance has earned it the nickname "dim sum basket building". It was Heatherwick Studio's first completed project in Singapore.

On 25 March 2026 the building was renamed the UOB Innovation Hub, with support from a gift by UOB and the Wee Foundation, and part of it was converted into an incubator for start-ups while remaining a learning space with smart classrooms.

== History ==
Heatherwick Studio was appointed in 2011 after winning a competition for the project, which called for a learning environment suited to teaching in which tutors guide group discussion rather than deliver lectures. The design was developed with CPG Consultants as architect of record. The building was completed in March 2015, and was shortlisted in the Future Projects category of the 2015 World Architecture Festival awards. It was officially launched on 20 October 2015 as part of NTU's push towards flipped-classroom teaching.

On 14 April 2025 UOB and the Wee Foundation pledged a gift of S$110 million to NTU, which with government matching could grow to an endowment of up to S$275 million. On 25 March 2026, in a ceremony witnessed by Heng Swee Keat, chairman of the National Research Foundation, the building was relaunched as the UOB Innovation Hub. Supported by the gift, the hub aims to incubate more than 90 venture teams and start-ups over five years and hosts the NTU Venture Creation Programme.

According to the student newspaper The Nanyang Chronicle, 18 of the building's 56 classrooms, on its lowest two and a half floors, were converted into space for start-ups. The change drew objections from students, particularly from the College of Humanities, Arts and Social Sciences, whose classes had used the building; a student-led petition had collected 367 signatures by 8 April 2026. NTU said that smart classrooms and study spaces remained available to all students.

== Architecture ==
The building consists of twelve towers that taper towards their base and stand on 61 angled concrete columns. The towers are formed by stacking 56 rounded classrooms around a naturally ventilated central atrium, so that the building has no long corridors; balconies, gardens and open-air walkways between the classrooms provide space for informal interaction. The towers are clad in curved concrete panels with irregular horizontal ridges, cast using silicone moulds, and more than 700 drawings by the illustrator Sara Fanelli, depicting images from science, art and literature, are set in relief on the walls of the stair and lift cores. The building has a gross floor area of about 14,000 square metres (150,000 sq ft) and received the Building and Construction Authority's Green Mark Platinum rating for its low-energy cooling systems.

The building received mixed reviews. The Architectural Review wrote that while "there is much to admire" about it, it "gave off something of a forlorn car-park aesthetic".

The building also houses NTU Library's Library Outpost, on its first level.
