= Garden Bridge =

Proposed pedestrian bridge in London, England

Garden Bridge proposal
- Computer rendering of the proposed bridge, underlit at dawn and high tide, created by Arup
- Coordinates: 51.5097°N 0.1129°W
- Carries: Footpath
- Crosses: River Thames
- Preceded by: Waterloo Bridge 200m
- Followed by: Blackfriars Bridge 300m

Characteristics
- Material: Clad concrete
- Total length: 366 metres (1,201 ft)
- Width: 30 metres (98 ft) (max, width varies)
- No. of spans: three

History
- Designer: Thomas Heatherwick
- Engineering design by: Arup; Detailed design by COWI A/S (formerly Flint & Neill)
- Construction start: Never started
- Construction cost: over £200 million (estimate April 2017)
- Opened: Never opened: project abandoned before building work began

Location
- Interactive map of Garden Bridge proposal

The Garden Bridge project was an unsuccessful private proposal for a pedestrian bridge over the River Thames in London, England. Originally an idea of Joanna Lumley, and strongly supported by then-Mayor of London Boris Johnson, the designer Thomas Heatherwick worked with Arup Group on a proposal by Transport for London (TfL) for a new bridge across the Thames between Waterloo Bridge and Blackfriars Bridge. The proposed concrete, steel, cupronickel clad structure was intended to carry pedestrians, with no cycles or other vehicles. It was to have been located some 200 metres (660 ft) from Waterloo Bridge and 300 m (980 ft) from Blackfriars Bridge, and have included some areas of planting. The project was to include a commercial building, built on former green space at the southern end of the bridge. The bridge was intended to be funded by raising over £140 million of private money (including taxpayer funding through charitable gift aid) and £60 million of promised public money, of which £30m was from Transport for London (£20m of this to be repaid over 55 years) and £30m from the Department for Transport, adding up to projected funding of over £200m. In January 2017, the trustees of the prospective owner of the bridge, the Garden Bridge Trust, stated that costs would "substantially exceed" an earlier revised total of £185m and, in April 2017, a report by Margaret Hodge MP concluded, on the basis of the Garden Bridge Trust's own evidence, that the cost would be over £200m.

If built, it was proposed that the bridge would have been open from 6am to midnight, with closures for the preparation for and holding of up to 12 private commercial events per year to raise funds for its maintenance. A planning condition required annual maintenance costs to be guaranteed by a third party and it was expected that this would be the Greater London Authority. The annual maintenance costs were variously estimated at between £2m and £3.5m, before allowing for the repayment of loan capital and interest.

In July 2016, preparatory work for the bridge was halted and the Garden Bridge Trust put contractors on standby to allow for a financial review and because they had not cleared outstanding issues such as securing legal rights to the land on either side of the river, despite signing a contract for construction of the bridge in January 2016. In September 2016, Sadiq Khan, Mayor of London, announced a formal review by Margaret Hodge of the procurement processes in relation to the bridge project and its value for money. In October 2016, the National Audit Office reported on procurement issues and perceived value for money for that part of the cost of the project which was being met by funds (£30m) from the Department for Transport. In January 2017, the trustees of the Garden Bridge Trust (the limited company behind the project) said they were unable to conclude that the trust was a going concern. In February 2017, the Charity Commission for England and Wales found the financial management of the trust to be satisfactory, albeit with criticisms as to the trustees' approach. The subsequent report by Margaret Hodge MP was highly critical of the plan, its procurement, its cost, the risk to public funds, and lack of value for money.

The Garden Bridge Trust formally announced on 14 August 2017 that it would be ending the project and that the Garden Bridge Trust itself would be wound up in accordance with the Companies Acts. The failed project cost £53m, including £43m of public money.

== Ownership ==
The Garden Bridge Trust, a registered charity (charity registration number 1155246) and a company limited by guarantee registered in England and Wales, and with an exemption from use of the term "Limited", was to own the bridge, as private space in the public realm. The company was incorporated on 30 October 2013 under reference 08755461. Lord Davies of Abersoch is chairman of the trust and a director of the limited company.

== Design ==
Location of the Garden Bridge as in The Garden Bridge Trust Guest Consultation.

The bridge would have been 366 metres (1,201 ft) long and 30 metres (98 ft) across at its widest point. It would have run from the roof of Temple tube station at the foot of Arundel Street on the north bank to Queen's Walk on the South Bank, next to ITV's London Studios, where a public green open space would have been sacrificed and built upon to provide a commercial building associated with the bridge, with removal of some 28 mature trees. The new building would have housed a combination of public toilets, maintenance facilities, and operational areas, together with an events space which was intended to be occupied by Coin Street Community Builders who have a long lease of the area on which the building would have been constructed. The bridge would have featured trees and shrubs, hedging plants and climbers, perennials, ferns and grasses, and bulbs. Its construction would have required the felling of mature trees on both sides of the river, including 28 plane trees in the avenue on Queen's Walk which were planted in the 1960s as a living memorial to London's war dead. The bridge was to have been planted with some 270 immature trees. In order to limit the wind loading on the bridge structure the trees would have been maintained by pruning so that they never exceeded a height of 15 m (49 ft) at the bridge piers and 2 m (6 ft 7 in) near the bridge landings. Dan Pearson was appointed as landscape designer.

Before granting planning permission, Westminster City Council raised concerns that the bridge would cause "significant harm" to a number of protected views from Waterloo Bridge, Blackfriars Bridge, and the South Bank, but concluded that new views from the garden bridge would outweigh the damage caused. The bridge's proposed private owners claimed however that English Heritage stated in an assessment that "the Bridge would be as a picturesque incident in the riverscape….its low slung and restrained architecture and engineering will change the character of views but not cause harm to the setting of, and views to and from historic assets."

== Operation ==
In November 2014, it was claimed that the bridge would be off limits to groups of eight or more people and to cyclists. The Garden Bridge Trust later said that groups of eight or more would not be banned and cyclists would be allowed to use the bridge, if they were to dismount and push their cycles.

The bridge would have been open to the public for 18 hours each day, closing between midnight and 6am. The draft business plan allowed the Garden Bridge Trust to close the bridge for up to 12 days a year for commercial events. Further, the charity proposed to rent the rooftop of the bridge's South Bank landing podium for commercial purposes on every weekend between May and October.

Nine bridges already span the two miles (3.2 km) between Westminster Bridge and London Bridge, seven of which can be crossed on foot. Projections of visitor numbers suggested that the bridge would have added another 3.5 million visitors a year, an 18% increase on 2014 numbers. In 2014, critics of the project began campaigning to have it brought under judicial review or another appeal process through the secretary of state.

In November 2015, planning documents for the bridge revealed that public access to the bridge was to be controlled, including the use of the tracking of visitors' mobile phone signals to guard against overcrowding, a video surveillance system and security staff known as "visitor hosts" who would have limited policing powers under a Community Safety Accreditation Scheme, including the right to issue fines. The rules of the bridge were to prohibit "any exercise other than jogging, playing a musical instrument, taking part in a 'gathering of any kind', giving a speech or address, scattering ashes, releasing a balloon and flying a kite." The bridge's private owners claimed that conditions would be "similar" to those of the Royal Parks.

At a meeting at City Hall on 17 December 2015, Boris Johnson, then Mayor of London said, in defence of the project, "It's important that we don't rest on our laurels, but continue to adorn the city with things that will attract visitors … and to get it done within a four-year mayoralty is a very challenging thing." During the 2016–2017 review conducted by Dame Margaret Hodge for the Mayor of London, the only parties to express support for the bridge were Boris Johnson, the Garden Bridge Trust (the prospective owner of the bridge) itself and the Evening Standard while, on the other hand, "hostility" to the bridge was "substantial".

== Funding ==
By August 2016, the proposed cost of the bridge had risen to £185 million, from the original estimate of £60m. When first promoted, it was claimed that the project would be financed entirely from private sources, but a total of £60m towards the capital cost was then committed from public funds, with £30m pledged from Transport for London (TfL) funds by Mayor of London Boris Johnson and £30m pledged by HM Treasury. It was then agreed in November 2015 that £20m of TfL funds would be repaid over a period of 50 years as a loan.

Further, the City of Westminster granted planning permission conditionally upon provision of a guarantee of maintenance costs. The Greater London Authority initially indicated willingness to underwrite those maintenance costs, estimated at a minimum of £2m a year, in perpetuity. In June 2013, the Commissioner of Transport for London, Sir Peter Hendy had stated that the public would meet no more than the "enabling costs" of the project of £4m. Nevertheless, the financial chief for Transport for London considered the proposed bridge extremely expensive when compared with other crossings on the Thames. For example, the Millennium Bridge had cost only £22m.

Writing in The Guardian in February 2016, Ian Jack contrasted the £60m taxpayer support for the project with the closure of five Lancashire museums – two of which are nationally important – and 40 libraries. Jack described the bridge as unwanted and unnecessary and the closures as "cultural disembowelment". He asked whether a meeting between Joanna Lumley, a friend of designer Thomas Heatherwick and Boris Johnson had played a part. Jane Duncan, president of the Royal Institute of British Architects requested the project be put on hold pending an investigation of the tendering process for the appointments of Heatherwick Studio and Arup. Ian Jack followed up in May with another article calling the bridge an oddity born of the "chumocracy", and correspondents from outside London were equally scathing.

On 16 February 2016, Walter Menteth of Project Compass CIC, a procurement intelligence service, published a detailed report on the irregularities in the procurement leading to the appointment of Arup Group and Thomas Heatherwick by Transport for London; the report concluded that an independent investigation would be appropriate before the public made any further financial commitment to the project.

On 8 March 2016, the Evening Standard editor Sarah Sands wrote in defence of the bridge:

a whopping £85 million had been privately donated; the Treasury and Transport for London had come up with £60 million and fundraising continues for the final £30 million. Construction will soon begin. Yet there is a small but determined opposition to the project, mostly from Labour, which continues to undermine it.

In the 17 months to 31 March 2016, the Garden Bridge Trust spent over £26 million, 80% of which was funded by Transport for London. In the same period, the group raised £13 million in new private donations.

However, the project's financing status deteriorated. During the same period in which the project's cost estimate was revised upward from £60 million to over £200 million (as of April 2017), the Garden Bridge Trust lost two major donors, causing a reduction in private funding pledges to £69 million. No new pledges had been obtained since August 2016.

Sadiq Khan, who had been elected Mayor of London in May 2016, undertook an investigation of Johnson's decisions in relation to the procurement process for the bridge. In May 2016, he published a draft version of the Garden Bridge Trust business case for the bridge which showed that donations to the Trust from unnamed private companies, organisations and individuals totalled £83.1 million, representing the privately pledged money; this included £43.75m from donors who chose to remain anonymous. London Assembly Member Tom Copley called for transparency on private donations to the project, asking if donations had been received from companies which may benefit or have benefited from Transport for London contracts. The Charity Commission case report published on 28 February 2017 subsequently found that the processes for awarding of contracts were robust, and that benefactors were not party to contracts made by the charity.

In July 2016, Dan Anderson of Fourth Street published a review of the Garden Bridge's Draft Operations and Maintenance Business Plan. Anderson's report concluded that "After detailed analysis of the Operations and Maintenance Business Plan it is this author's considered opinion that the basic business model is flawed and the Business Plan targets are optimistic at best, but more likely unachievable".

On 11 July 2016, the BBC reported that preparatory work for the bridge had been halted to allow City Hall to review the finances. Sadiq Khan said that no more public money would be spent on the bridge. The halted work would have cost £3m for infrastructure preparation in the Tube station at Temple on the north bank of the Thames so that the bridge structure could be built on its roof. A Garden Bridge Trust spokesman said that the Garden Bridge Trust had signed a costs agreement with TfL which included a repayment schedule.

On 26 July 2016, the BBC reported that the project had run into financial trouble and that the Garden Bridge Trust was seeking an extension of a £15m underwriting of the project: "tough questions are being asked in Whitehall about the footbridge and its public value". The additional assurance of the underwriting extension was needed in order for the Garden Bridge Trust to complete and file its statutory accounts, due on 31 July 2016. However, on Friday 29 July 2016, the last day on which it could validly do so, the Garden Bridge Trust changed its accounting reference date so as to extend its accounting period from 31 October 2015 to 31 March 2016, a further five months, postponing its obligation to file any accounts.

On 8 August 2016, the National Audit Office formally announced that during Autumn 2016 it was to investigate the Department for Transport's handling of its £30 million grant to the Garden Bridge project. The audit would not seek to determine the value for money of the project as a whole. The Director of the audit team was to be Rebecca Sheeran. The National Audit Office invited submission of evidence for its investigation. The National Audit Office duly reported in October 2016.

In an interview with Evan Davis on BBC Newsnight on 17 August 2016, Lord Davies of Abersoch said that the Garden Bridge Trust had raised some £69.5 million ("call it £70 million") of private funds in addition to £60 million of public funds. Some who had offered funding had never entered into legally binding commitments to pay and "one or two" had withdrawn from the project. Further, delays in the project now meant that the costs had risen to £185 million and that the bridge would not be completed before 2019. The figures of increased cost and the reduction in funds raised, together with the longer timescale, were then confirmed by the Garden Bridge Trust.

In September 2016, the Mayor of London announced a formal review into project's finances and value for money. Dame Margaret Hodge conducted an inquiry into the planned structure. The mayor's office said she would investigate whether value for money had been achieved from the taxpayers' contribution and investigate the work of bodies such as Transport for London and the Greater London Authority. The Hodge Report was published in April 2017.

In January 2017, the trustees of the Garden Bridge Trust stated that they expected the bridge's costs to "substantially exceed" the existing estimate of £185 million, and the Hodge Report in April 2017 stated that costs were estimated to be over £200 million.

=== National Audit Office report ===
On 11 October 2016, the National Audit Office reported the results of its inquiries into the £30 million funding provided for the Garden Bridge by the Department for Transport. The report recorded that in the department's assessment of the original business case for the Bridge there was seen to be a significant risk that the project could represent poor value for money but the department agreed to make the £30 million contribution anyway. The manner in which the funding was provided, by block grant to Transport for London left the department with limited oversight of its own support to the Garden Bridge Trust. This arrangement simplified the Trust's access to public funding through a single source but it also made TfL responsible for assuring and overseeing all of the £60 million public funding and for ensuring value for money for taxpayers' investment. There was initially a cap on the amount of the department's funding that could be used by the Garden Bridge Trust for pre-construction activity, but this cap was relaxed on three separate occasions, on two of those occasions against the advice of civil servants and on one of them by way of formal ministerial direction from the Secretary of State. The report summarised that:

If the project continues, it is possible that the government will be approached for extra funding should the Trust face a funding shortfall. The project has faced cost increases and delays to the schedule. The pattern of behaviour outlined in this report is one in which the Trust has repeatedly approached the government to release more of its funding for pre-construction activities when it encounters challenges. The Department, in turn, has agreed to the Trust's requests.

=== Charity Commission report ===
On 28 February 2017, the Charity Commission published a Case Report which commented on the financial management of the Trust. The Charity Commission concluded that trustees had been meeting their duties and were acting in compliance with charity law; there was no concern about the management of conflicts of interest; the charity's financial management met required standards; trustees provided strategic leadership and direction to the charity and its staff to help it deliver its purpose; trustees understood their roles and duties and responsibilities as trustees; the Commission saw evidence of robust and informed decision-making.

Arrangements to award contracts since the charity had been formed appear to have been robust. There was evidence of significant trustee engagement and some benchmarking of hourly rates and materials. However, trustees did not fully explore the opportunities to compare the critical paths of other comparable infrastructure projects and thus better enable themselves to assess project risk.

The Commission went on to comment that the charity's accounts had been filed and had identified ongoing uncertainty over whether the charity was a going concern. The Commission considered that, given the public interest, the trustees could have provided more detail in their annual report about the progress made, given the expenditure incurred and the challenges addressed. The charity held no reserves but expected to meet any obligations from the use of its restricted funds. Given the reliance on using restricted funds the commission would have expected a fuller description of how these funds, including the guarantee, could be used with greater detail on how the charity would meet its liabilities in the event of closure.

== Planning process ==
=== Initial planning approval ===
The full planning applications for the project were submitted to Westminster and Lambeth Councils on 30 May 2014, and it was originally intended, subject to receiving planning permission and raising the necessary funds, that construction of the bridge would start in 2015 and be completed by 2018. The planning application was approved by Lambeth Council (local authority on the south side of the bridge), subject to conditions, in November 2014. Westminster City Council passed a plan for the bridge on 2 December 2014 by a vote of three to one. In December 2014, Boris Johnson approved the scheme to build the bridge, with construction then expected to start in 2015.

=== Judicial review ===
In January 2015, a legal challenge of Lambeth's planning permission was brought by Michael Ball, former director of the Waterloo Community Development Group, with the support of local opposition group Thames Central Open Spaces. On 21 April 2015, permission was granted by The Hon. Mr Justice Ouseley for a full judicial review of Lambeth's decision to grant planning permission on the grounds that the impact of views on heritage assets (particularly Somerset House) had not been properly considered, and Lambeth had not adequately ensured the ongoing maintenance of the bridge. However, it was agreed the case should be dismissed after Lambeth and the trust agreed to enter into a planning obligation requiring the trust to submit a plan for the maintenance of the bridge for approval by the council, and to provide a surety or guarantor for the trust's ongoing maintenance obligations. The Greater London Authority has guaranteed the maintenance costs.

A second judicial review, of Lambeth's decision to allow a variation of the lease on the South Bank, was dismissed in September 2016.

=== Lease and permission ===
On 25 September 2015, Lambeth Council suspended negotiations with the Garden Bridge Trust over the terms of the lease, which would be required at the South Bank end of the bridge. Lambeth's position was that funds for the bridge should not be provided by Transport for London, that the £30m of funding from Transport for London was not justified, and that Lambeth would permit the bridge only if it was assured that the project's funds would not be taken from Transport for London. Negotiations were resolved in November 2015.

However, in March 2016 it was reported that Lambeth Council had put the necessary lease modifications in place. Permission from the Coin Street Community Builders, a housing trust which holds a long-term lease over part of the land needed to construct the southern approaches, was also required for the bridge's construction. In March 2016, in "a last ditch" attempt to stop the bridge, local politicians wrote to the housing trust urging it to refuse permission, although the housing trust indicated that it was not in a position to oppose the decisions of elected governments.

The planning permission for the bridge had been due to expire in December 2017.

== Project collapse ==
=== Hodge report ===
Margaret Hodge's report for the Mayor of London was published in April 2017. It found that: there had been multiple failings from the start; the business case for construction of the bridge was weak; the purpose of the bridge was confused and unclear; the Garden Bridge Trust had raised only £69m in private pledges of funding; the final cost if built would now exceed £200m of capital expenditure, excluding the amount of any possible endowment for maintenance; the project was controversial and unpopular and the Garden Bridge Trust was unlikely to be able to raise the money, and that taxpayers should accept the loss of public money already spent that would result from cancelling the project and avoid further waste of public funds. She also concluded that the appointments in 2013 of Heatherwick Studio (for design and consulting services) and Arup (for engineering and project management services) "were not open, fair or competitive procurements … and [her review had] revealed systematic failures and ineffective control systems at many levels". Architecture critic Rowan Moore described the project as "a landmark of the post-truth era" and a vanity project by Boris Johnson.

=== Refusal of mayoral guarantee ===
In response to the Hodge report, Mayor of London Sadiq Khan, Johnson's successor, announced on 28 April 2017 that he would not provide a guarantee for the future running costs of the bridge, due to concerns about the project's financial viability. Since the guarantee was a condition of planning permission, the mayor's refusal had the effect of ending the project.

=== Formal abandonment ===
On 14 August 2017 after months of uncertainty the Garden Bridge Trust entirely abandoned the project. The BBC London transport correspondent Tom Edwards described the situation as a shambles which was "an embarrassing mess for the capital ... already descend[ing] into finger pointing and a blame game over who is culpable for wasting £46.4m of public money". In February 2019 it was revealed that the total public cost had been £43m.
