= Thomas Heatherwick =

English designer and architect (born 1970)

Thomas Heatherwick CBE RA RDI HonFREng
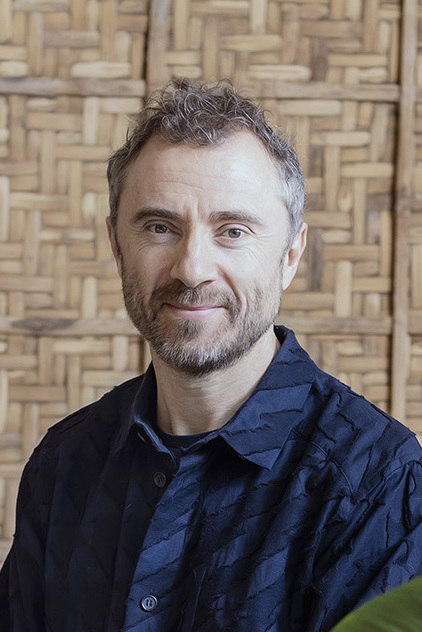
- 2023 portrait of Heatherwick
- Born: Thomas Alexander Heatherwick; 17 February 1970 (age 56); London, England
- Education: Manchester Polytechnic; Royal College of Art
- Notable work: The Rolling Bridge (2005); B of the Bang (2005); East Beach Cafe (2005); UK pavilion at Expo 2010; Longchamp store in SoHo; Olympics cauldron (2012); Zeitz MOCAA (2017); Vessel (2019)
- Honours: Commander of the British Empire
- Website: Heatherwick Studio

Thomas Alexander Heatherwick, CBE RA RDI HonFREng (born 17 February 1970) is an English designer and the founder of London-based design practice Heatherwick Studio. He works with a team of about 250 architects, designers and entrepreneurs from his studio in King's Cross, London.

Heatherwick's projects, many of which have won design awards, include the UK pavilion at Expo 2010, the renovation of the Hong Kong Pacific Place, the Olympic cauldron for the 2012 Summer Olympics and Paralympics, Vessel in New York City, and the New Routemaster bus. The Garden Bridge over the Thames in Central London was cancelled.

== Life and career ==
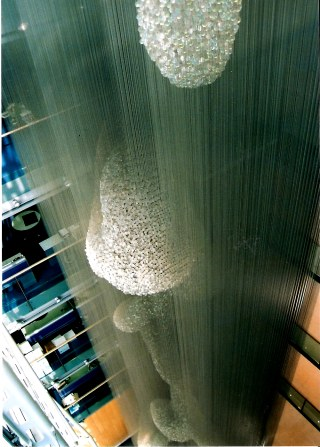
Bleigiessen, Wellcome Trust, London

Heatherwick was born in London. His mother designed jewellery; his father was a musician, ran a charity and later worked for Heatherwick's design firm. His maternal great-grandfather was the owner of Jaeger, the London fashion firm, one of his grandmothers founded the textile studio at Marks & Spencer and was subsequently an art therapist, and his uncle was the journalist Nicholas Tomalin. After primary school in Wood Green, he attended the Rudolf Steiner School Kings Langley, in Hertfordshire, which emphasises gardening, handcrafts, and the performance art of eurythmy, and Sevenoaks School in Kent. He studied three-dimensional design at Manchester Polytechnic and furniture design at the Royal College of Art (RCA). In his final year at RCA in 1994, Heatherwick met designer Terence Conran; after seeing Heatherwick's plan for a gazebo made of two curved stacks of birch plywood, Conran invited him to construct it at his country home, and bought it.

Heatherwick founded Heatherwick Studio in 1994 after his graduation from the RCA. Conran asked Heatherwick to make an interior display for the Conran Shop, which led to his first public commission after Mary Portas saw it and commissioned Heatherwick to make a window display for the 1997 London Fashion Week at the Harvey Nichols department store.

Heatherwick is the general director of the 2025 Seoul Biennal of Architecture and Urbanism, under the theme ‘Radically more Human’.

He is a Senior Fellow and external examiner at the Royal College of Art, a Senior Research Fellow at the Victoria & Albert Museum; a fellow of the Royal Academy, and a Royal Designer for Industry. He has served on numerous judging and advisory panels and has given talks at institutions including the RIBA, Bartlett School of Architecture, the South Africa Design Indaba conference, the Royal Academy and TED2011.

== Selected works ==
=== Rolling Bridge ===
Video of the Rolling Bridge in operation

In 2002, as part of a redevelopment of Paddington Basin, Heatherwick Studio designed The Rolling Bridge, a canal bridge that opens by curling into a circle rather than rising in one or more rigid sections. The Rolling Bridge won the 2005 British Constructional Steelwork Association's Structural Steel Award.

=== B of the Bang ===
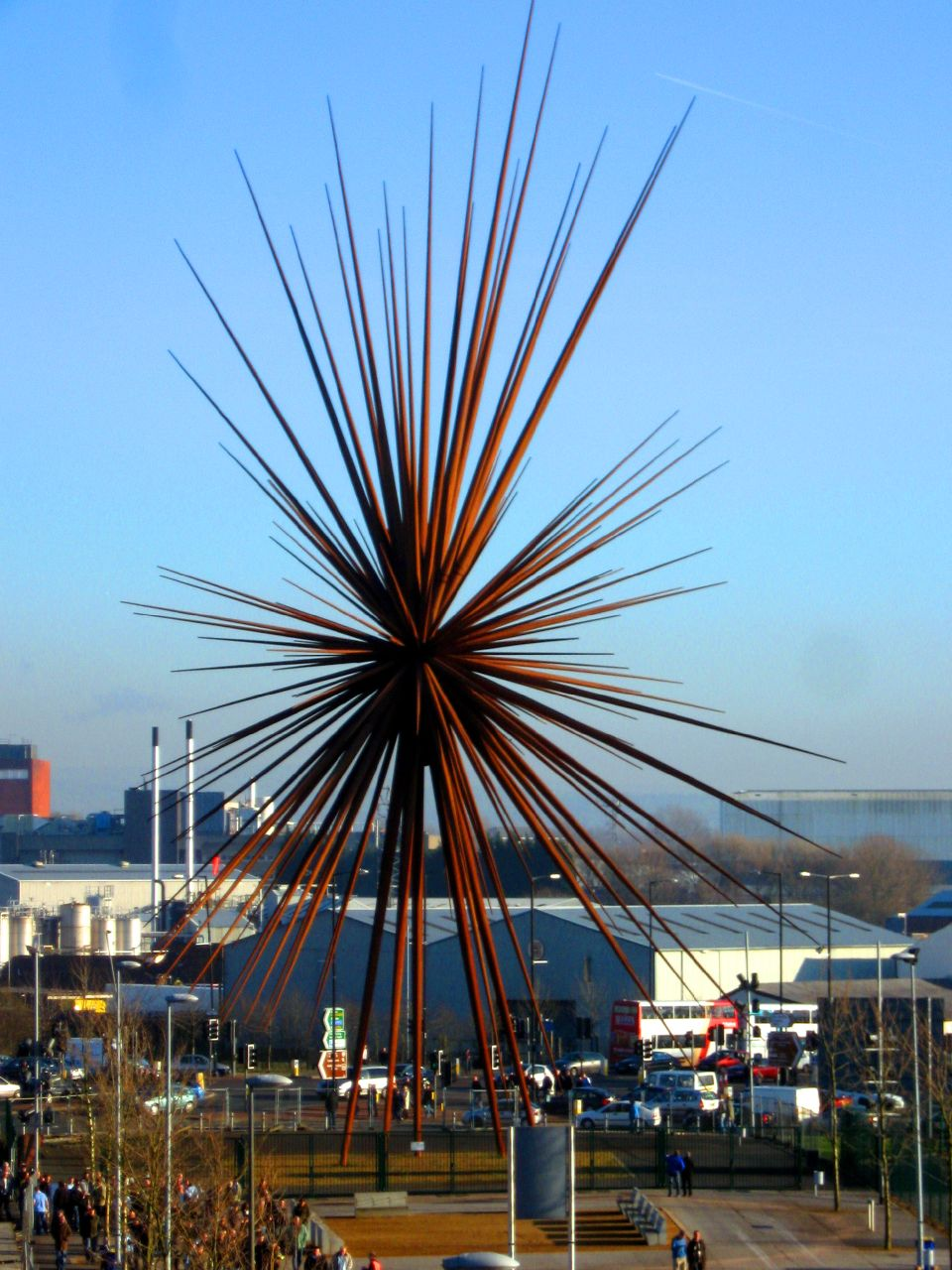
B of the Bang, Manchester

Heatherwick's design for B of the Bang, a £1.42 million 56m-high sculpture of 180 giant steel spikes, was unveiled outside the City of Manchester Stadium in 2005. The tallest public sculpture ever erected in Britain, it was commissioned to commemorate the 2002 Commonwealth Games, and took its name from a quote from former Olympic sprint champion Linford Christie about the explosion of energy as a runner starts out of the blocks. Danny Boyle said it was the inspiration for his asking Heatherwick to design the Olympic cauldron.

However, technical problems caused one of the spikes to dislodge within two weeks, and a further 22 required removal over the next four years. Despite a plea from Angel of the North creator Anthony Gormley to Manchester City Council which described the sculpture as "remarkable, dynamic and engaging", it was dismantled and placed in storage in 2009. The council sued Heatherwick Studio and their subcontractors over the problems, settling out of court for £1.7m, and in 2012 the sculpture's core was sold for scrap.

=== East Beach Café ===
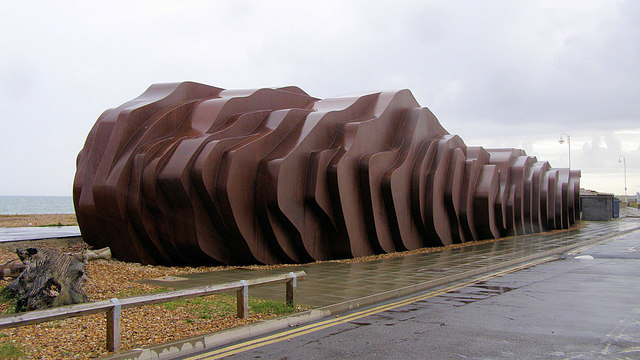
East Beach Cafe

In 2007 Heatherwick Studio completed the East Beach Café at Littlehampton, West Sussex. The long, single-storey building with a rippled silhouette evoking a sea shell has an outer skin of steel which was allowed to rust before the resulting colours were fixed with an oil-based coating. The café won a RIBA National Award in 2008.

=== Worth Abbey ===
In 2009, Heatherwick was appointed to redesign the church interior at Worth Abbey. The new furnishings, including pews, choir stalls, monastery seats, desks and confessionals, were made of solid hardwood, ash embedded within walnut, but the pews began to crack after a few months. Heatherwick blamed the contractor.

=== UK Pavilion, Shanghai Expo 2010 ===
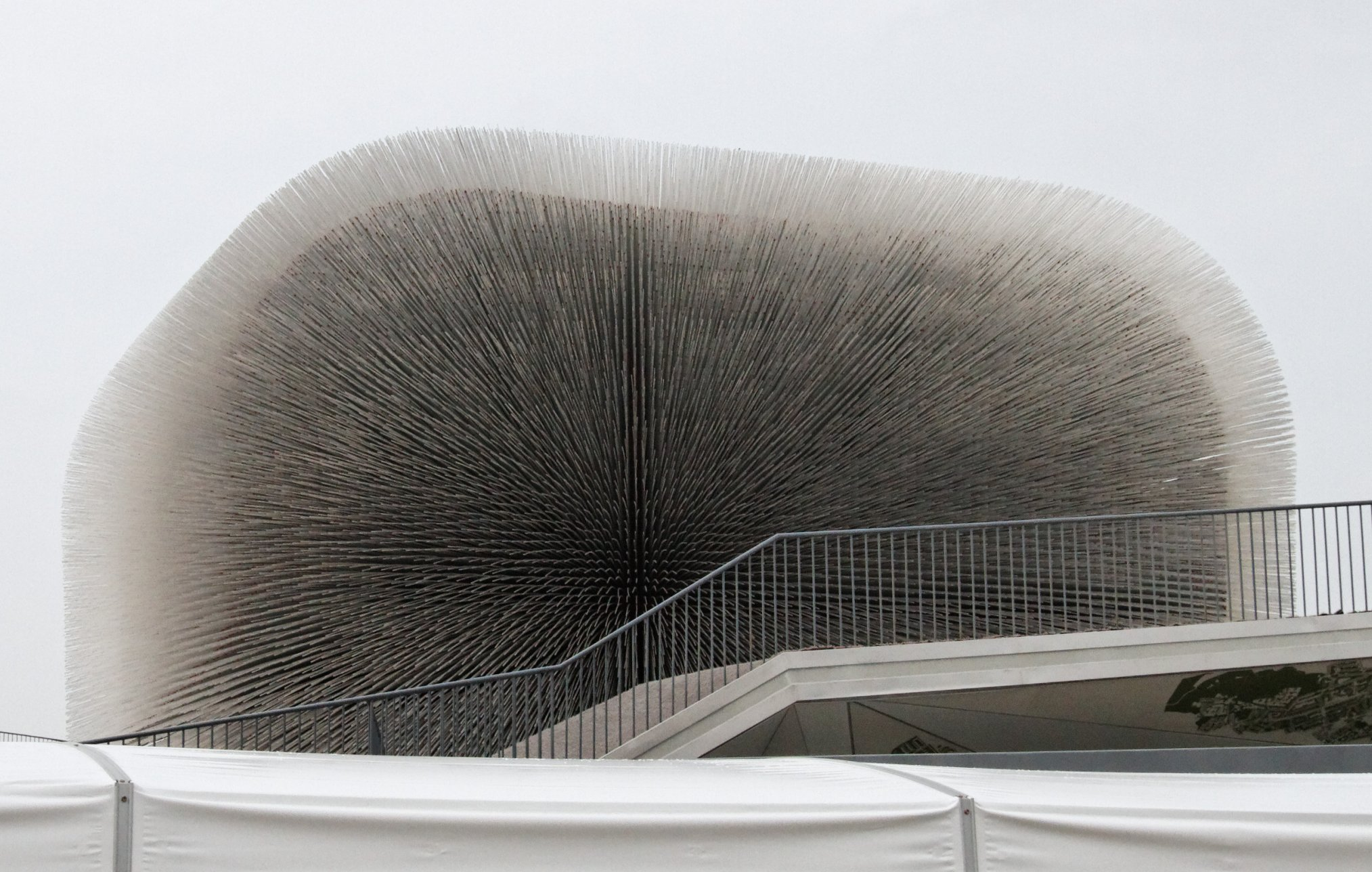
UK Pavilion at 2010 Expo, Shanghai

Heatherwick Studio designed the UK's pavilion, dubbed "Seed Cathedral", for Expo 2010 in Shanghai. In keeping with the exposition theme, "Better City, Better Life", the pavilion explored the relationship between nature and cities. It was set in a parklike environment and consisted of a timber and steel composite framework pierced by 60,000 fibre-optic rods, each housing on the inside one or more plant seeds from Kew Gardens' Millennium Seed Bank Partnership.

The UK pavilion won the gold medal of the Bureau International des Expositions for best pavilion design in its size class, and the RIBA Lubetkin Prize. After the Expo, the pavilion was dismantled, and some rods were donated and others auctioned off for charity.

=== New Routemaster bus ===
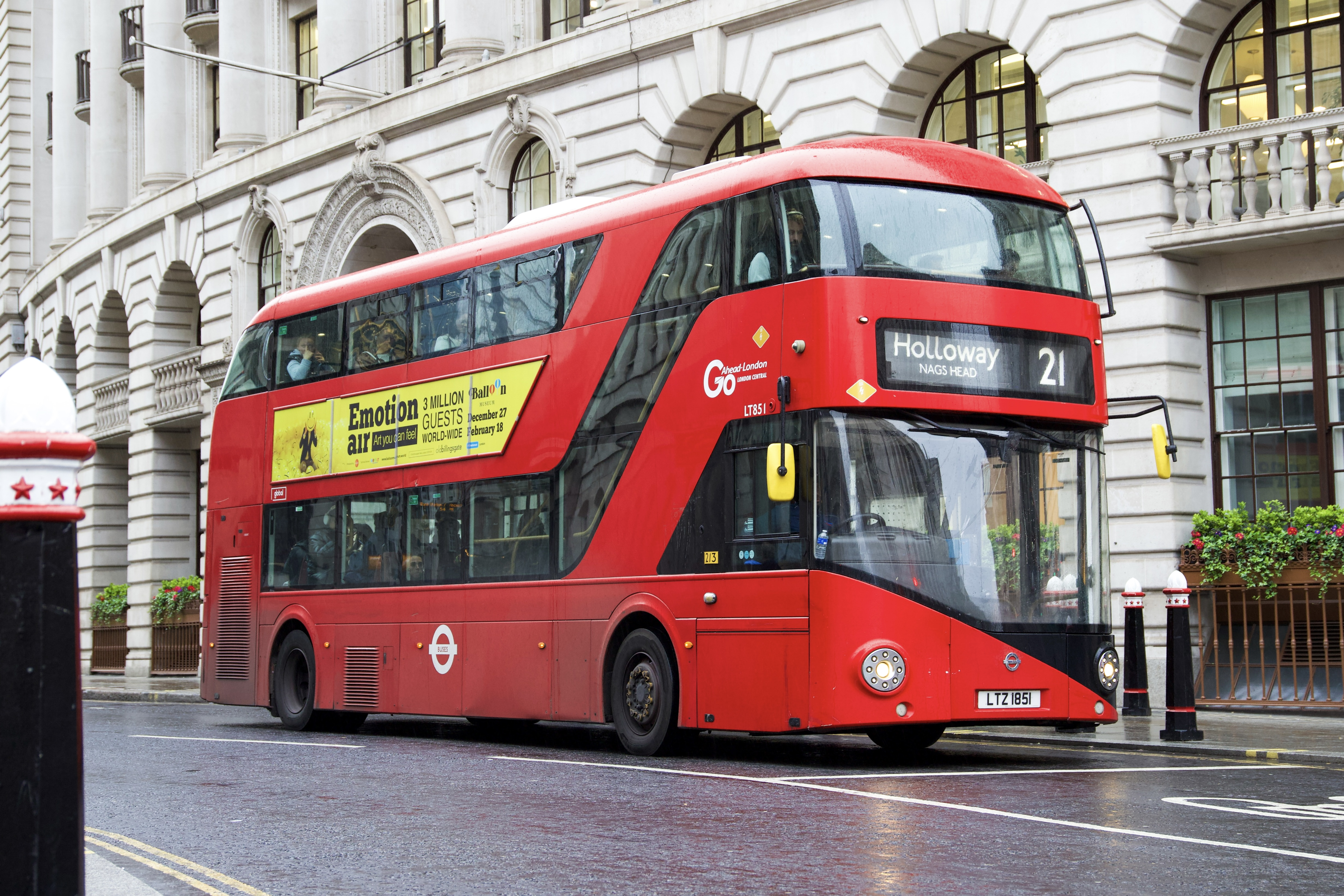
New Routemaster double-decker omnibus

In 2010, the Mayor of London Boris Johnson announced that Heatherwick Studio would be designing the New Routemaster double-decker bus, the first bus in more than 50 years to be commissioned specifically for London. A prototype by Wrightbus was unveiled in December 2011; the first buses entered service in February 2012 and Transport for London ordered 600 in September 2012 and a further 200 in 2014. The design features a long front window for the driver and a wrapped glazing panel for passengers, with three doors and two staircases for faster and easier boarding. The diesel-electric hybrid engine is also significantly more fuel-efficient than previous hybrid buses. The first buses reinstated the rear open platform of the 1950s AEC Routemaster, but the expense of staffing the rear door led to elimination of the feature after 2015.

After complaints from passengers about excessive heat in summer, starting in 2015 the buses were retrofitted with openable windows. There were also complaints about faulty batteries leading to high emissions from over-reliance on the diesel engine. The New Routemaster influenced Alexander Dennis's Enviro400H City Bus, which Transport for London began introducing in 2016. In January 2017, Sadiq Khan discontinued Routemaster purchases as a cost-saving measure, promising instead to retrofit older London buses with the latest sustainable technologies. At Euro Bus Expo 2022, Equipmake showed a New Routemaster converted to fully electric operation; the bus is being tested by Transport for London.

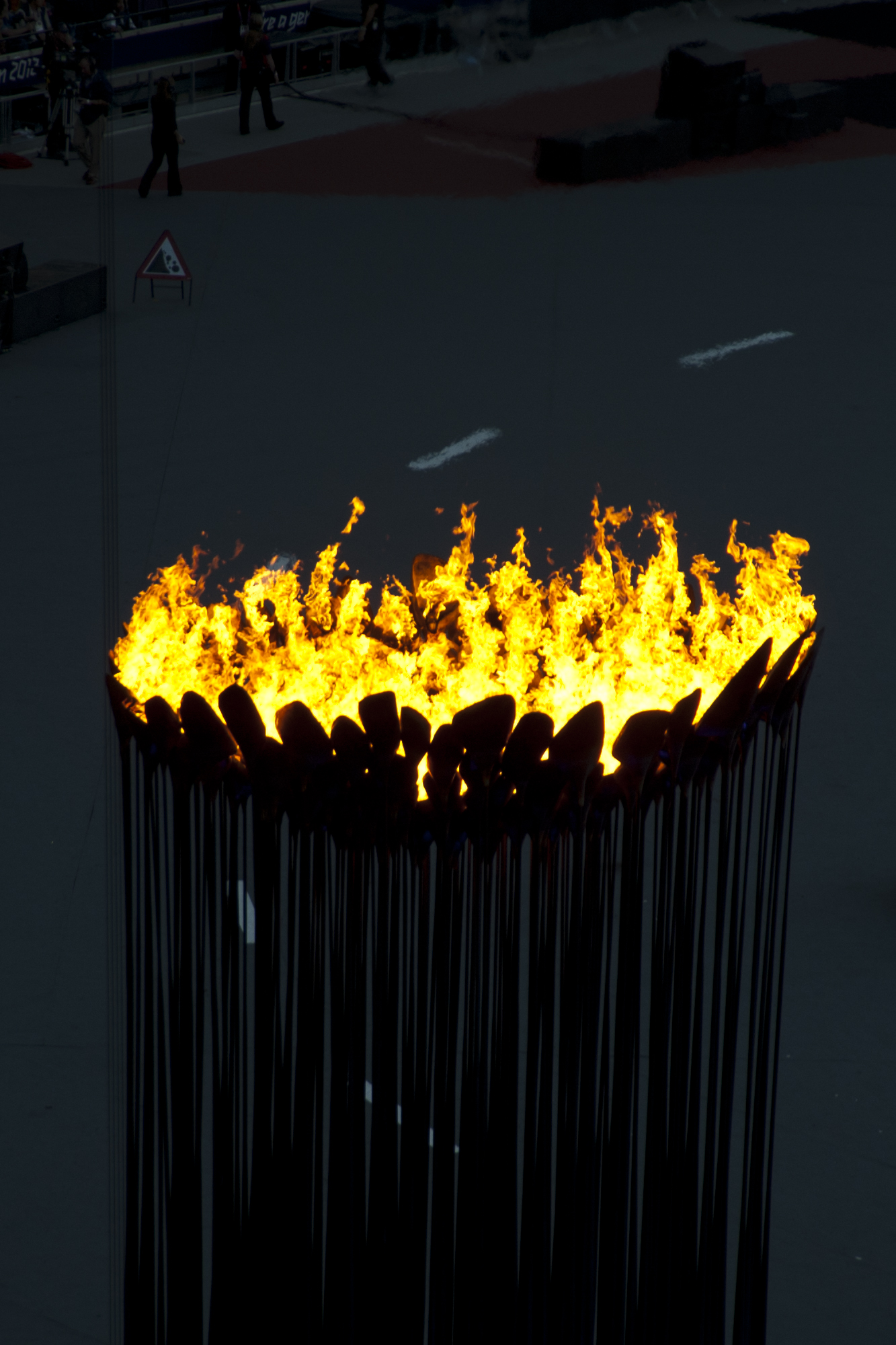
2012 Olympic cauldron

=== 2012 Olympic cauldron ===
Heatherwick Studio was asked by Danny Boyle, the artistic director of the opening ceremony of the 2012 Summer Olympics in London, to design the Olympic cauldron to be used for the Summer Olympics and Paralympics. Heatherwick's design departed from the tradition of a raised bowl by instead consisting of an 8.5m-high "dandelion" of 204 copper "petals" hand-made by skilled car body workers, which were brought into the Olympic Stadium by children representing each team as part of the Parade of Nations, then mounted on blackened steel gas pipes which were lit by seven torchbearers and then rose in concentric circles from the centre outward. The merging of the flames symbolised the nations coming together in peace. After the close of the Games, each participating country was offered a petal. In July 2014, an exhibit on the cauldron opened at the Museum of London.

In June 2013, New York design studio Atopia claimed that Heatherwick's Olympic cauldron design was substantially identical to a composite flower powered by solar cells which they had designed in 2007 at the request of the London Olympic committee for a One Planet Pavilion. (A non-disclosure agreement barring all companies from promoting work related to the Olympics was in place from 2007 to 2013, and prevented earlier raising of the issue.) Heatherwick, Boyle, and Martin Green, who had been head of ceremonies at the Olympic committee, all denied knowledge of Atopia's proposal. In summer 2014, the organisers of the London Olympics reached an out-of-court settlement acknowledging that key elements of the cauldron were present in Atopia's proposal. Heatherwick however said that "the design process was categorically our own, from start to finish."

=== Proposed Thames Garden Bridge ===
In 2013, with the support of actress Joanna Lumley, Heatherwick proposed the Garden Bridge, a pedestrian bridge across the Thames in central London that would be planted as a woodland park. The project was originally to have been entirely privately financed; in 2016, Mayor of London Sadiq Khan froze funding after £60m of public money had been committed to it out of a total estimated cost of £175m, some by Transport for London to strengthen Temple tube station in order for it to bear the weight of the north end of the bridge.

In 2017, it was found that Heatherwick was the sole founding member of the Garden Bridge Trust and had attended eight trustee meetings, leading to accusations of conflict of interest; he had repeatedly denied being part of the trust. Heatherwick had also attended a secret fundraising meeting in California with Apple with then-Mayor Boris Johnson in 2013, before the design contract had been officially awarded.

In April 2017, in a report ordered by the Mayor, Margaret Hodge, the former chair of the Public Accounts Committee, concluded that the project should be cancelled: the £46 million of public money already lost was preferable to risking additional demands if the project proceeded. The report stated that the appointments of Heatherwick Studio as designer and Arup as engineers "were not open, fair or competitive ... and revealed systematic failures and ineffective control systems". The project was officially cancelled on 14 August 2017.

=== Bombay Sapphire distillery ===
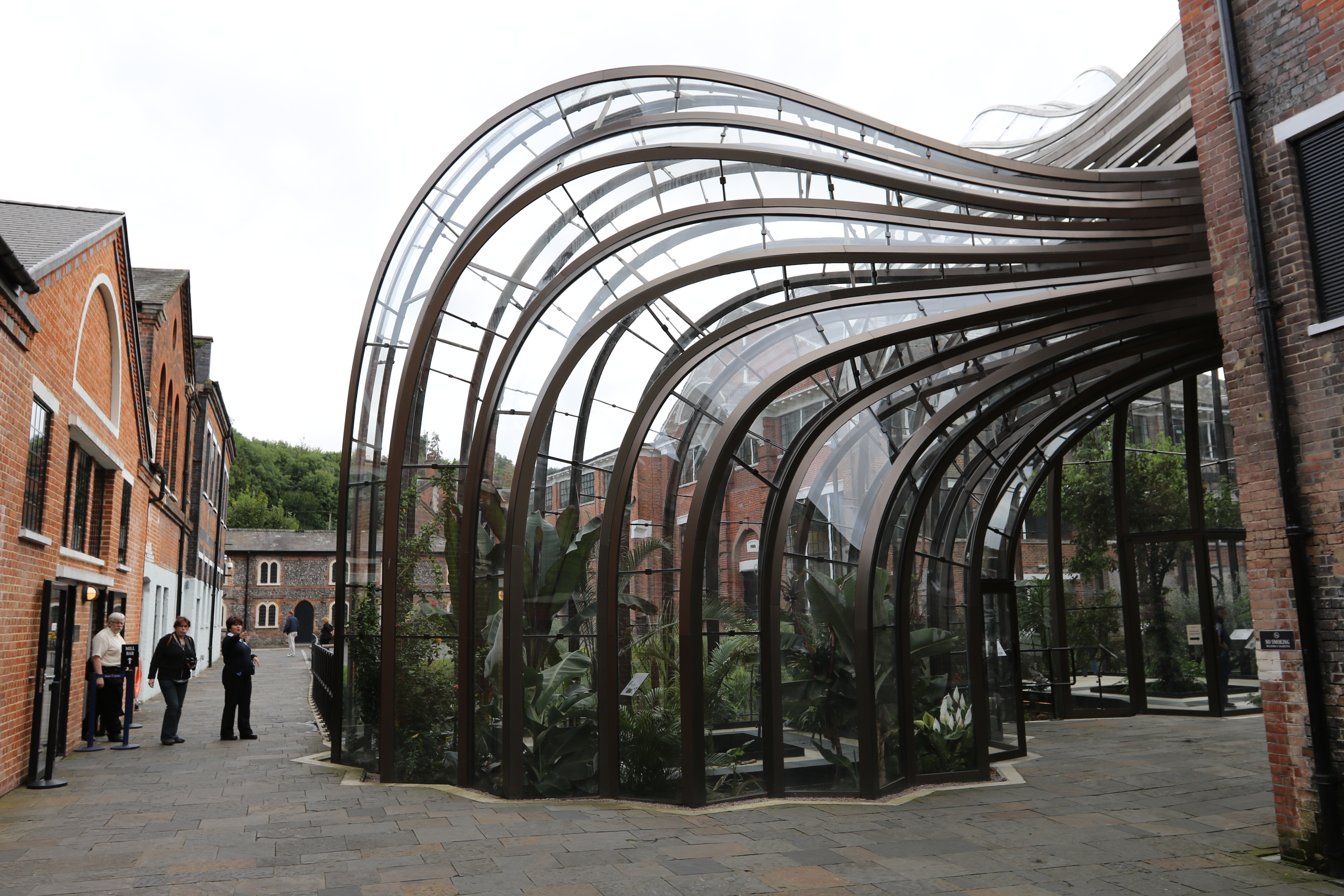
Bombay Sapphire distillery glasshouses

Working with English Heritage and English Nature, Heatherwick Studio led the masterplan and design for the transformation of the former Laverstoke Mill bank note printing plant in Laverstoke, Hampshire into a gin distillery for Bombay Sapphire. Twenty-three of more than 40 derelict buildings were restored and 9 more recent industrial structures demolished; the channelised River Test, which flows through the site, was uncovered and widened and its banks planted; and a central courtyard and a pair of intertwined curvilinear glasshouses for the tropical and Mediterranean plants used in the manufacturing process were created. The plants, which are supplemented with others from their native ecosystems, draw on the river for water and are warmed by heat created by the distillation of the gin. The distillery was Heatherwick Studios' first conservation project and first commission for a production facility. Opened in 2014, it was the first drinks manufacturing plant and the first renovation to achieve BREEAM 'outstanding' accreditation.

=== Learning Hub ===
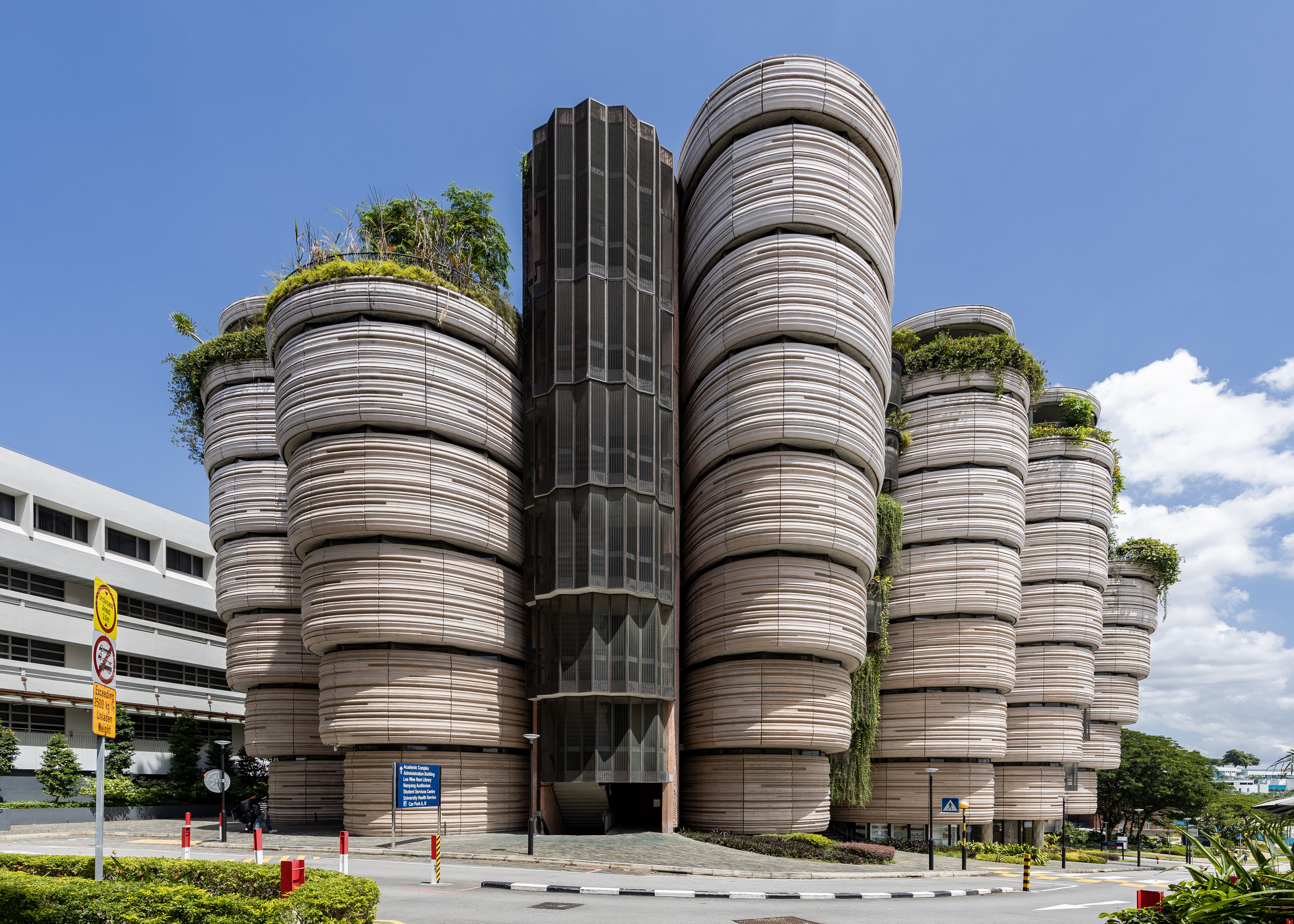
The Hive in Singapore

The Learning Hub, also known as The Hive, a multi-purpose educational facility built as part of a campus redevelopment programme by Nanyang Technological University in Singapore, opened in 2015. It maximises interaction between students and faculty and across disciplines by replacing rectangular rooms and corridors with twelve tubular stacks of tutorial rooms around a central atrium and 56 lecture rooms. Rooms are rounded in shape and can be reconfigured; the towers taper toward their bases for an organic appearance, and common spaces include balconies and garden terraces. The primary construction material is concrete, with metal stacks of balconies and screened stairs; the façade of the towers was imprinted with a pattern of horizontal lines using twelve silicone moulds, and the walls of the staircase and elevator cores, which are stained reddish-brown, with 700 drawings commissioned from illustrator Sara Fanelli as triggers for thought. The building won the Singapore Building and Construction Authority's Green Mark Platinum Award for Sustainability prior to its completion, and in 2015 was shortlisted for the WAN Concrete in Architecture award. It also contributed to Heatherwick Studios' winning the 2015 Creativity in Concrete Award of the British Concrete Society.

=== Coal Drops Yard ===
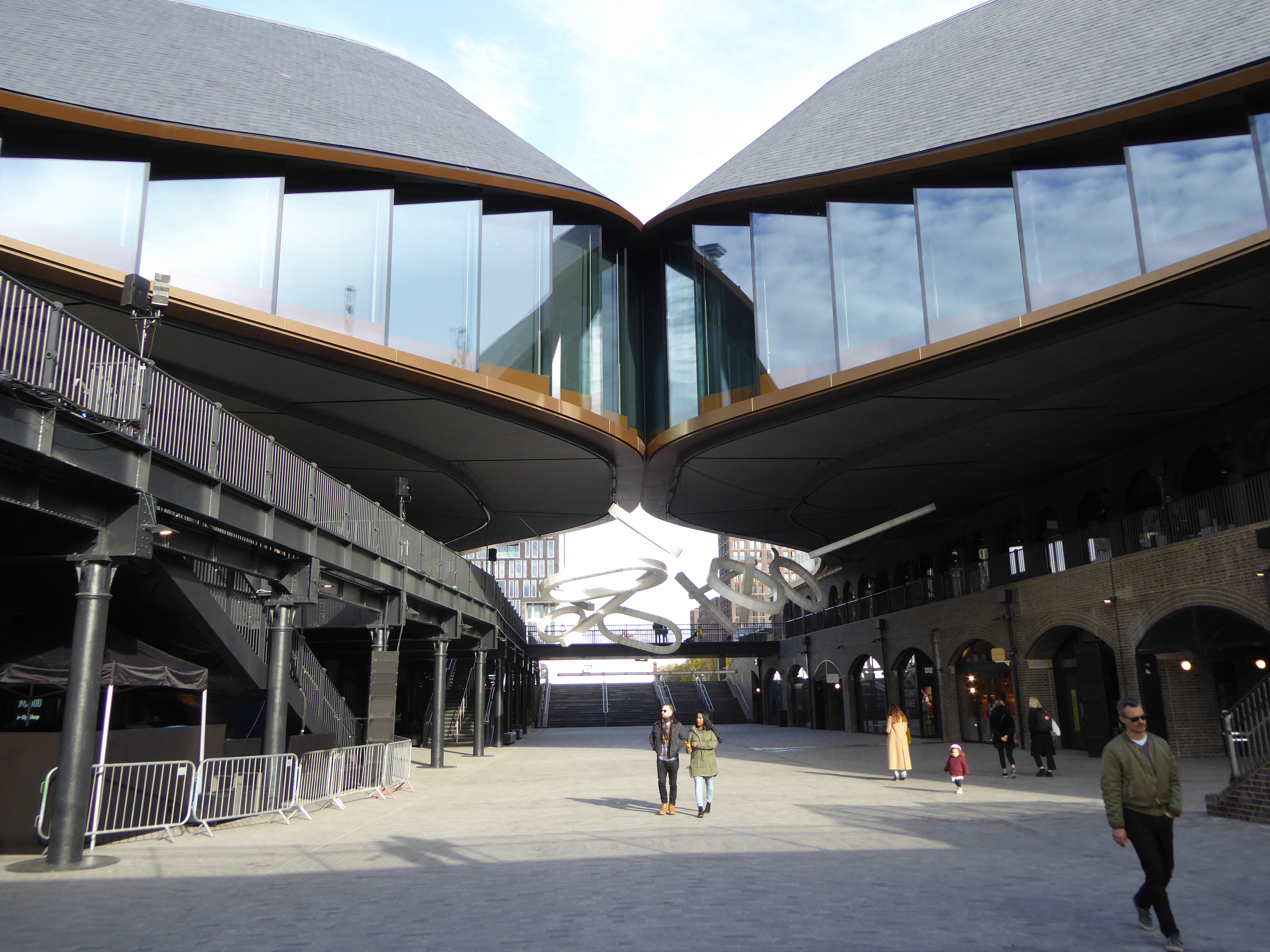
Coal Drops Yard

Coal Drops Yard is a public space and retail destination in King's Cross, London. The project included the renovation of two buildings built in 1850 and used to receive freight arriving from the north of England. The design stitches the two buildings together by extending the two roofs towards each other until they meet. This creates an additional storey and distinct centre to the linear site. The stretched roofs shelter the yard below which can be used to host events, whilst the third storey offers views of King's Cross, the Francis Crick Institute and Cubitt Square. The project is part of the wider re-development programme for the area by Argent LLP and King's Cross Central Limited Partnership (KCCLP). Coal Drops Yard was approved by planning in December 2015, and was completed in October 2018.

=== Zeitz MOCAA ===
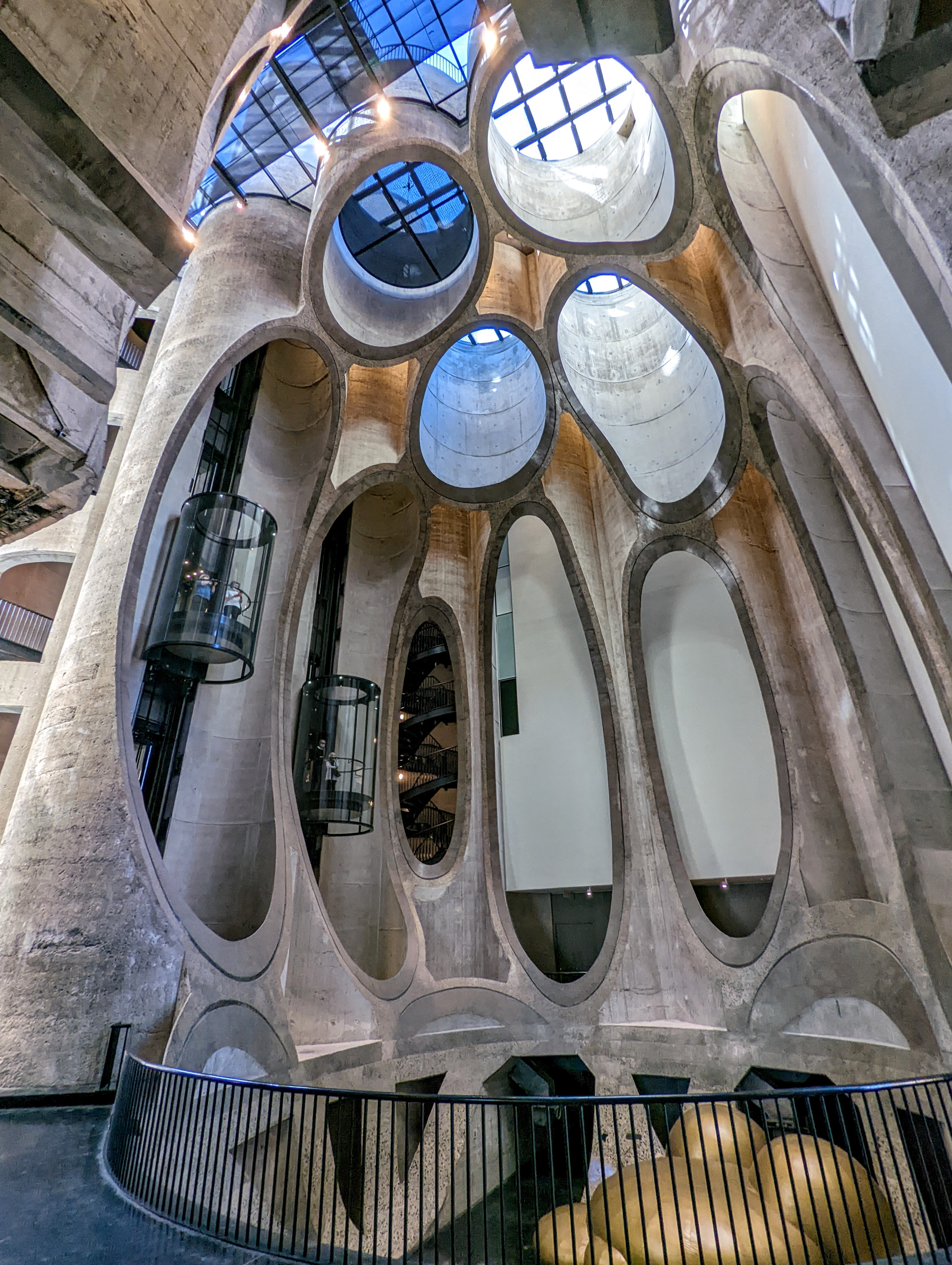
Zeitz MOCAA interior showing the converted grain silos

Heatherwick Studio worked on the conversion of the historic Grain Silo at the V&A Waterfront in Cape Town into a not-for-profit cultural institution, the Zeitz Museum of Contemporary Art Africa (Zeitz MOCAA), which houses the most significant collection of contemporary art from Africa and its diaspora. The 9,500 m^{2} (2.3 acres) complex consist of nine floors with 6,000 m^{2} (65,000 sq ft) of dedicated exhibition space. Using a variety of concrete-cutting techniques, galleries and a large central atrium were carved out of the silo's 42 concrete tubes. The concrete shafts were capped with strengthened glass that can be walked over by visitors, and designed to draw light into the building from above and create a cathedral-like interior.

The excavation of this interior space unifies two buildings; the silo and the grading tower. Bisected tubes contain cylindrical lifts and a spiral staircase. Pillowed glazing panels formed of segments of flat glass have been inserted into the upper floors. The Zeitz Museum of Contemporary Art Africa opened on September 22, 2017.

=== Vessel ===
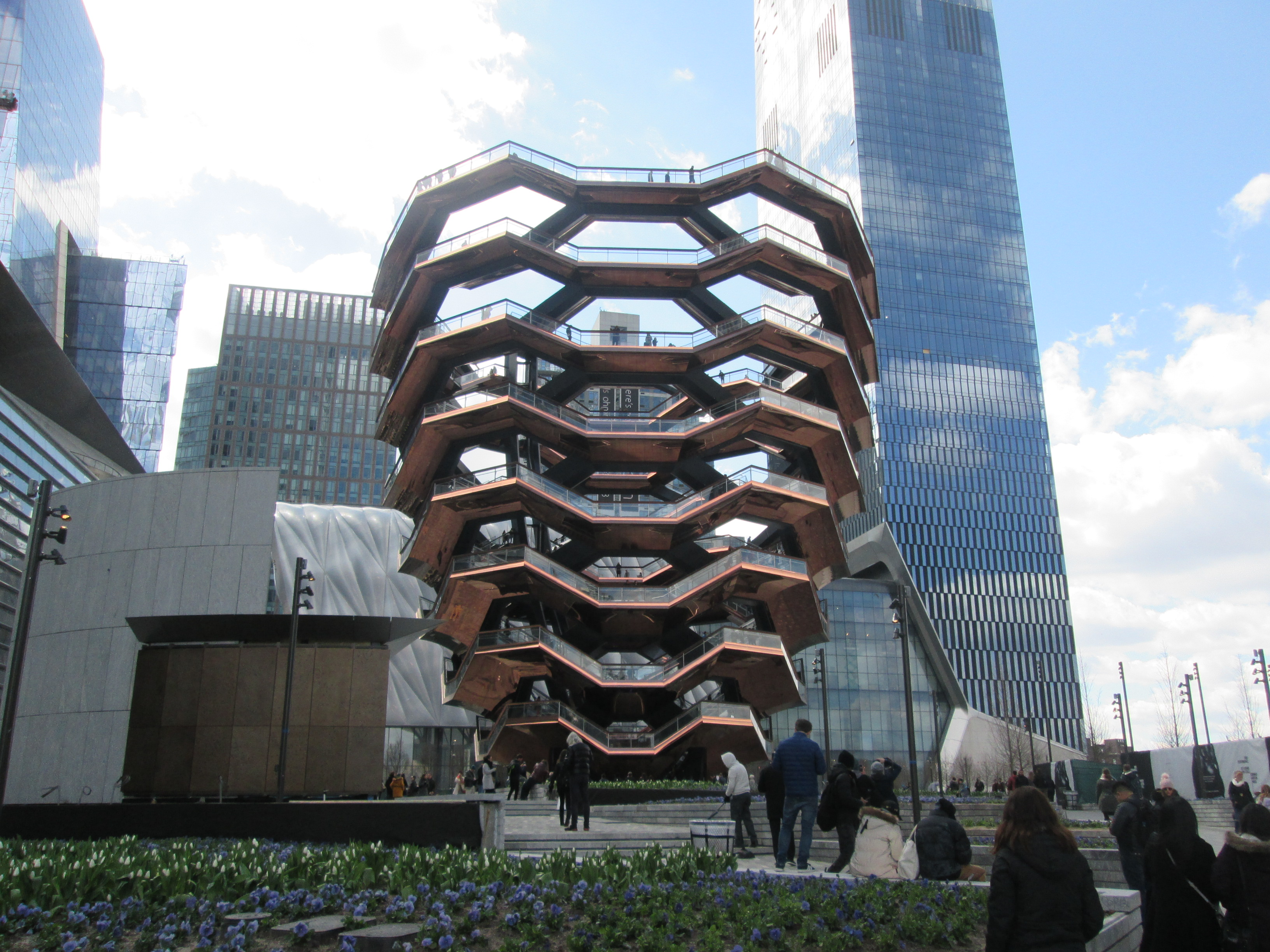
The Vessel in New York

In 2016, Heatherwick's design for the Vessel structure at Hudson Yards' Public Plaza in New York City was unveiled. The structure is in the form of a network of interlocking staircases that visitors can climb; its design was inspired by amphitheatres and by the ancient stepwells of India. It has 2,500 steps in 154 flights of stairs, equivalent to 15 storeys, and it has 80 viewing landings. Construction began in April 2017, and it opened on 15 March 2019. In August 2019, Vessel was the subject of a profile on the Sky Arts programme The Art of Architecture.

Vessel was closed to public access in 2021, after the fourth suicide in less than two years. After full-height steel mesh nets were installed on each level, news media reported in early 2024 that Vessel would reopen later that year, though the top level would remain closed. On October 21, 2024, Vessel reopened; initially, only the lowest two levels and parts of the upper levels were open to the public.

=== Bund Finance Centre ===
Heatherwick Studio collaborated with Fosters + Partners on the Bund Finance Centre (BFC) – a new mixed-use complex in Shanghai. The project is situated at the end of the Bund in Shanghai and envisioned as a connection point between the city's old town and the financial district.

The plan includes two 180-metre towers (590 ft) that combine offices, a boutique hotel and retail space. An arts and cultural centre is located at the centre of the scheme. Conceived as a platform for international exchange, the centre will feature art galleries and theatre spaces. The building is surrounded by an adaptable moving veil which reveals the stage on the balcony and views towards Pudong district.

=== Google headquarters ===
In 2015, Heatherwick Studio revealed that it was working on projects including the new Google Headquarters in Mountain View, California – in partnership with Bjarke Ingels Group (BIG). The project initially involved a series of dome-shaped buildings, but the project was revised later in 2016, with three buildings to be built in two different sites – one immediately adjacent to Googleplex, the other two smaller buildings a few blocks away.

Heatherwick and BIG also collaborated on a design on a London headquarters at King's Cross for Google. The Google King's Cross building, nicknamed the 'landscraper', includes a roof garden.

=== 1000 Trees ===
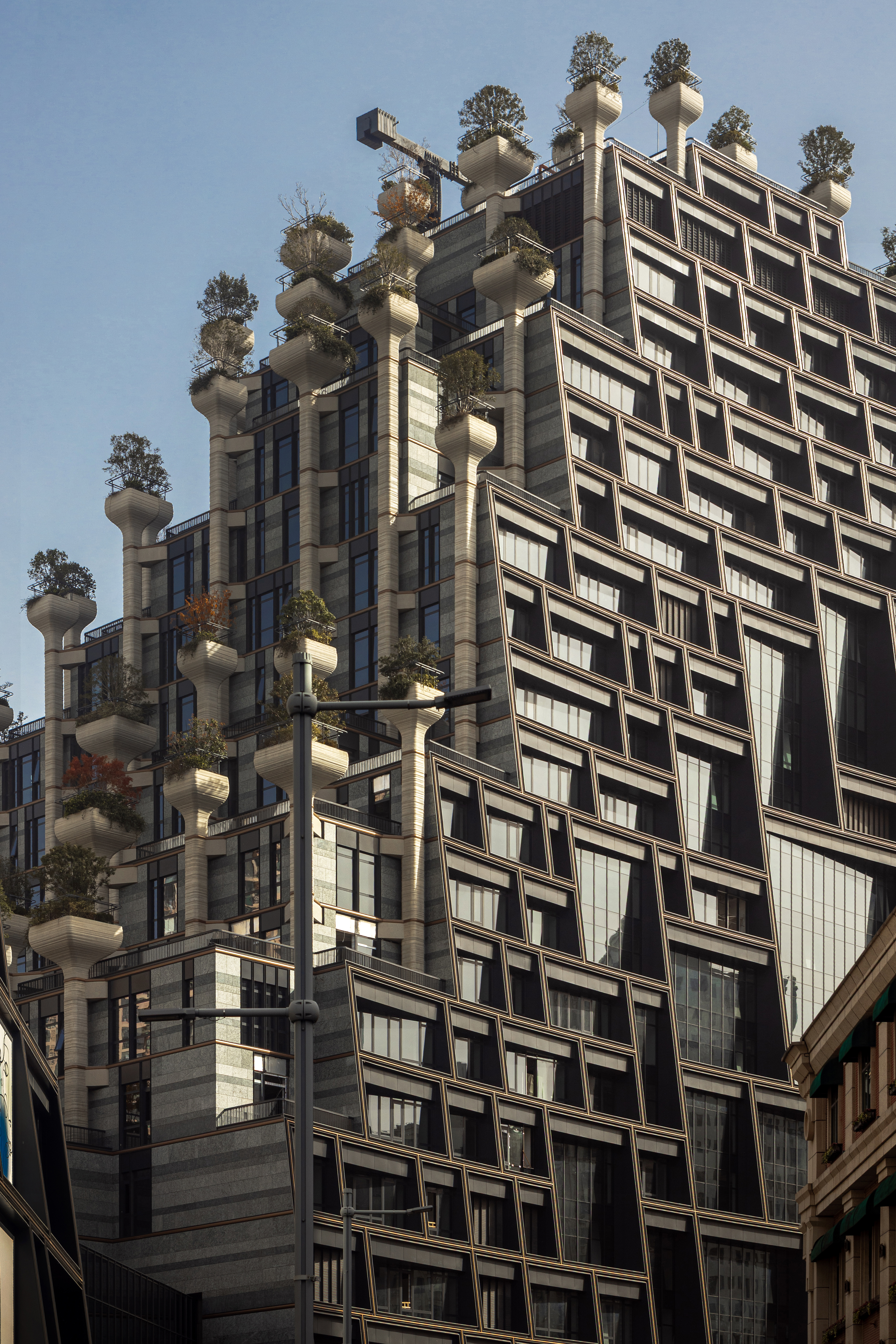
1,000 Trees in Shanghai in 2025.

Heatherwick started a development titled 1,000 Trees in Shanghai. The project comprises two mountain-like peaks built with trees planted on the buildings, and it is a mix-use development with retail and offices spaces, as well as event venues, galleries and a hotel. The design aims to unify a park that runs along the Suzhou Creek and the M50 Arts District, while the local height restrictions defined the height of the two peaks which slopes down to the park. Embedded within the development is an open-air art wall inspired by an art-wall that ran along Moganshan Road. Part of the design was also inspired by Moganshan. The project was completed in two phases, with the first phase opened in 2021.

=== Little Island ===
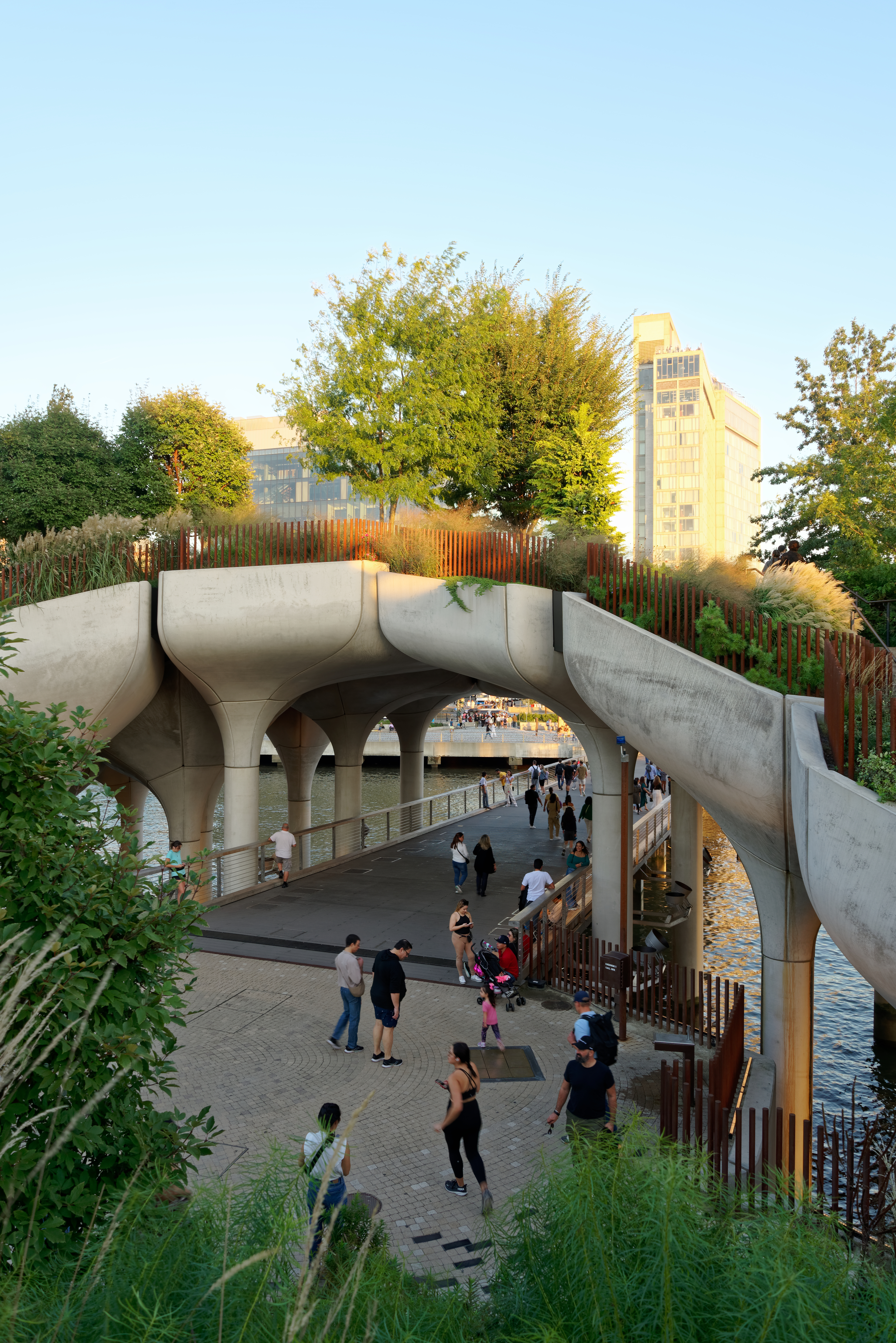
Little Island at Pier 55

In 2012, following a design competition, the Hudson River Park Trust and the Furstenberg Family Foundation selected Heatherwick Studio in collaboration with Mathews Nielsen Landscape Architects to design a new pier on Manhattan's southwest riverside. The park officially opened on May 21, 2021.

The design for Pier 55, based on the wooden piles in the Hudson River, uses the support structure of concrete piles to create a landscape topography. Little Island has an outdoor amphitheater for 687 people, a performance area for 200 people, and a large plaza with pathways and platforms.

=== Airo Car ===
In 2021, Heatherwick unveiled the design and concept for a pollution-eating car, Airo, at the Shanghai Motor Show. The project was designed by Heatherwick Studio for the newly formed Chinese car brand IM Motors. Named Airo, the electric vehicle will be fitted with a high efficiency particulate air filtering system that will actively clean air pollutants. Production of the car is set to start in 2023 in China.

== Other notable works and projects ==
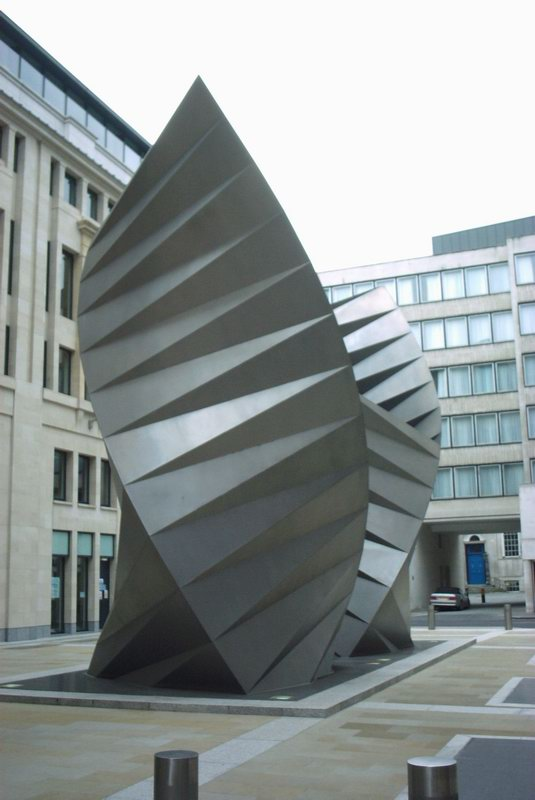
Paternoster Vents, at Bishops Court near Paternoster Square, London.

- Sculpted forms in laminated wood, Guastavino's, New York City (2000)
- Bleigiessen, Wellcome Trust, London (2002)
- Blue Carpet, Newcastle-Upon-Tyne (2002)
- Paternoster Vents, Paternoster Square, London (2002)
- Longchamp store in the SoHo district of New York City (interior design, 2004)
- Sitooterie II, Barnards Farm, West Horndon, Essex (2004)
- Southorn Playground, Wan Chai, Hong Kong (proposed redesign, 2005)
- Pacific Place renovation, Hong Kong (2005)
- Konstam Restaurant, Kings Cross, London (interior design, 2006)
- "Zip Bag" handbag for Longchamp
- Boiler Suit, Guy's & St Thomas' Hospital, London (facade and entrance, 2007)
- Studios Complex at Aberystwyth Arts Centre, Aberystwyth University (2009)
- EDEN Singapore (2020)
- Maggie's Centre, Leeds (2020)
- Lantern House, a residential development in New York City (2021)
- The Glass House, Woolbeding Gardens
- Azabudai Hills, a mixed-use development in Minato City, Tokyo (2023)
- Xi’an Centre Culture Business District, Xi'an, China (2024)

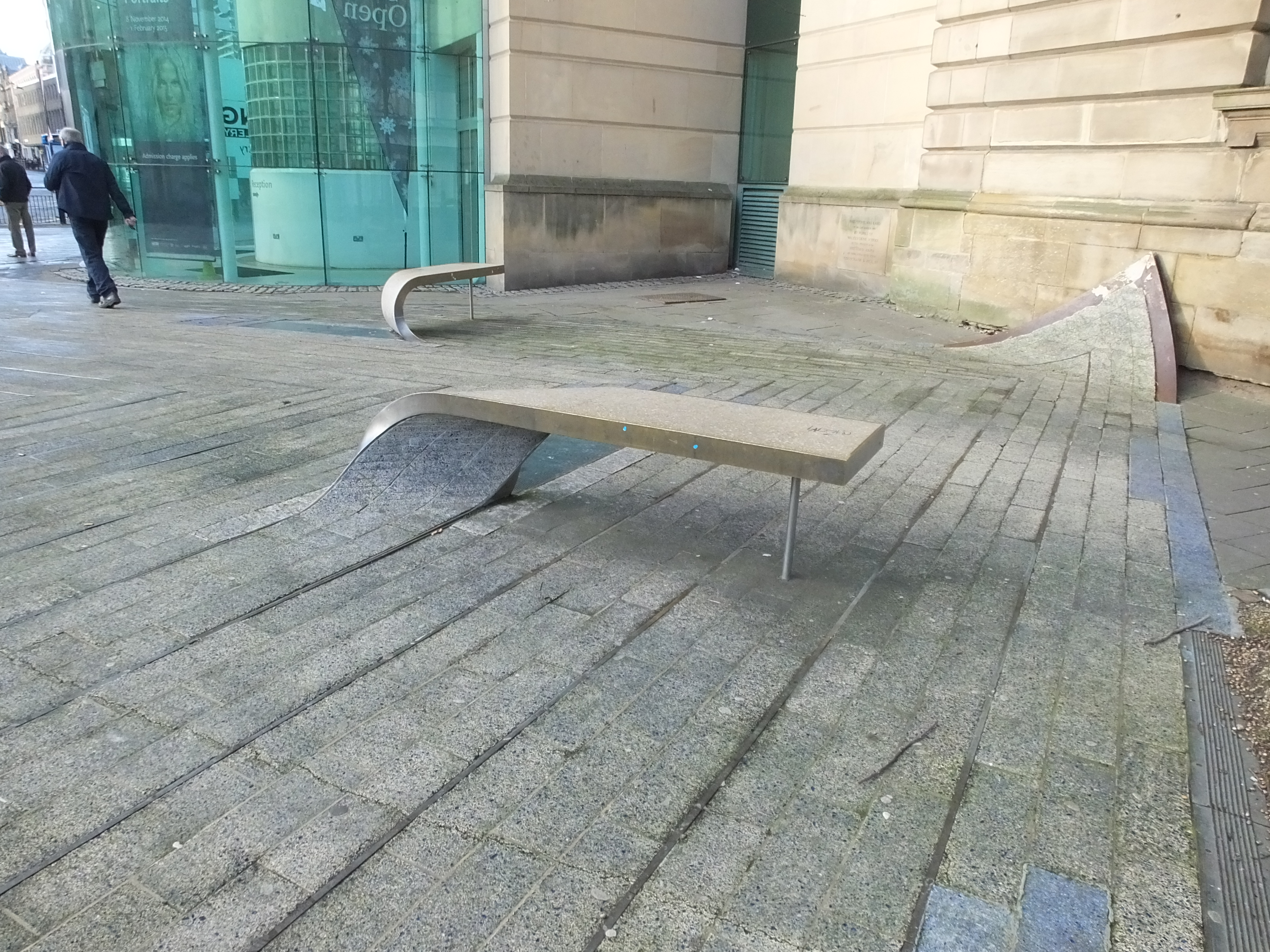
Blue Carpet. At the points where this skin reaches a building, the slabs curve upwards to create the sensation of a fabric. Replacement tiles show the colour of the original concept.

== Approach to design ==
Heatherwick Studio combines a wide range of design disciplines, including architecture, engineering, transport and urban planning to furniture, sculpture and product design. Heatherwick has emphasised his dislike since his student days of "sliced-up ghettos of thought" which separate metalwork, product design, furniture design, embroidery, fashion, sculpture, and architecture into distinct departments, preferring to see all three-dimensional design as a single discipline. Rather than working from flashes of inspiration, he compares the problem-solving orientation of his studio to solving a crime by a process of elimination.

== Exhibitions and publications ==
In 2012 the Victoria and Albert Museum put on a retrospective of Heatherwick Studio's work, titled Heatherwick Studio: Designing the Extraordinary.

The British Council hosted the major touring exhibition New British Inventors: Inside Heatherwick Studio. In 2015 and 2016 the exhibition travelled to six venues in East Asia and reached over 409,109 visitors. The museums and galleries the exhibition travelled to include: Singapore National Design Centre; CAFA, Beijing; Power Station of Art, Shanghai; PMQ, Hong Kong; Taipei Fine Arts Museum; and D Museum, Seoul. The first US exhibition Provocations: The Architecture and Design of Heatherwick Studio travelled to three venues in North America in 2014 and 2015: Nasher Sculpture Center, Dallas; the Hammer Museum, Los Angeles; and the Cooper Hewitt, Smithsonian Design Museum, New York City.

In 2012, coinciding with the Victoria & Albert exhibition, Thames and Hudson published Thomas Heatherwick: Making. A second volume was released in 2013. Making was updated in 2024.

In 2023 he published Humanise: A Maker’s Guide to Building Our World.

== Awards ==
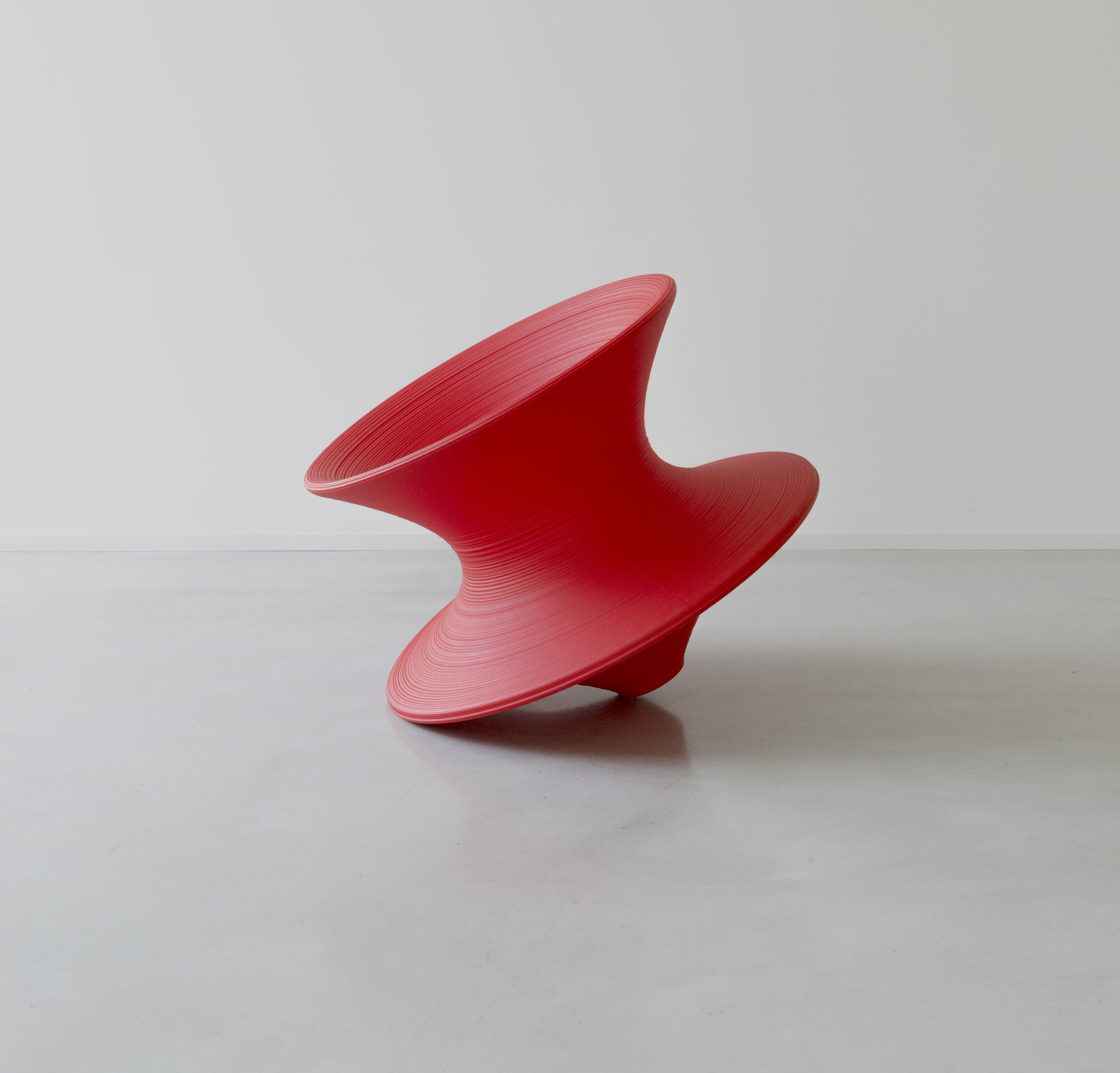
Spun chair for Magis (2005)

Heatherwick's design awards include the Prince Philip Designers Prize (2006), the London Design Medal (2010), the Tokyo Design and Art Environmental Award for designer of the year (2010), the RIBA Lubetkin Prize (2010) for the UK Pavilion, and the Compasso d'Oro (2014) for the Magis Spun chair (which is also held in the collection Compasso d'Oro collection of the ADI Design Museum in Milan).

In 2004 he became the youngest practitioner to be appointed a Royal Designer for Industry. He was made an Honorary Fellow of RIBA in 2007 and of the Royal Academy of Engineering in 2016. Heatherwick has been awarded Honorary Doctorates from the Royal College of Art, University of Dundee, University of Brighton, Sheffield Hallam University, University of the Arts London, and Manchester Metropolitan University.

He was appointed Commander of the Order of the British Empire (CBE) in the 2013 Birthday Honours for services to the design industry.

In 2015, Heatherwick was named one of GQ's 50 best dressed British men.

In 2019, Heatherwick received the Golden Plate Award of the American Academy of Achievement presented by Awards Council member Julie Taymor during the International Achievement Summit in New York City.
