= Directive =

Directive may refer to:

- Directive (European Union), a legislative act of the European Union
- Directive (programming), a computer language construct that specifies how a compiler should process input
- "Directive" (poem), a poem by Robert Frost
- Directive speech act, a particular kind of speech act which causes the hearer to take a particular action
- Lative case, a grammatical case that indicates direction

== See also ==
- Direction (disambiguation)
