= Directional light =

Directional light may refer to:

- Shading#Light sources
- Headlamp#Directional headlamps
- Light beam
- Light tube

== See also ==
- Direction (disambiguation)
- Light (disambiguation)
