= East Beach Cafe =

Cafe in Littlehampton, West Sussex

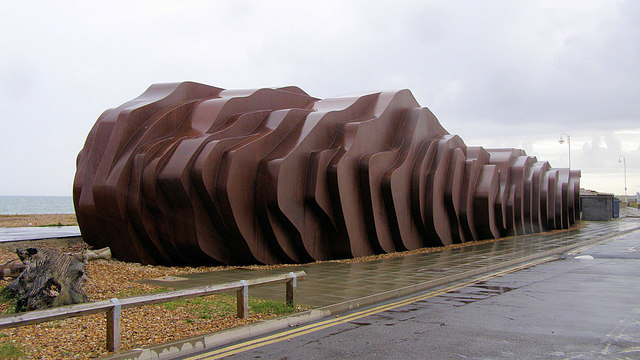
- The East Beach Cafe viewed from the rear.
- Interactive map of East Beach Cafe

Restaurant information
- Location: Sea road, Littlehampton, West Sussex, BN17 5DL, England
- Coordinates: 50.802862°N 0.532491°W
- Website: www.eastbeachcafe.co.uk

East Beach Café is a seafront cafe in Littlehampton, West Sussex, United Kingdom. It is owned by Jane Wood and Sophie Murray, who commissioned designer Thomas Heatherwick to create an iconic building for the seaside town of Littlehampton.

== Architecture ==
The cafe was designed by award-winning designer Thomas Heatherwick, and was his first building. The unconventional silhouette was designed to protect views from a nearby conservation area while offering sea views for customers.

The structure is 40 metres (130 ft) long, 7 metres (23 ft) wide and 5 metres (16 ft) high, and the side facing inland is windowless. It was built in Littlehampton, with steelwork by Littlehampton Welding ltd and site work by Langridge Developments, another local firm.

The building won a RIBA regional prize in 2008, judges describing it as "both strange and captivating; weird but lovable". In 2009 the Restaurant & Bar Design Awards awarded East Beach Cafe winner of the Exterior Space category. East Beach Cafe was awarded Coastal Cafe of the Year by National Magazine Company's Coast Awards in 2011.

== See also ==
- List of bakery cafés
