= Paternoster Square =

Square in the City of London, England

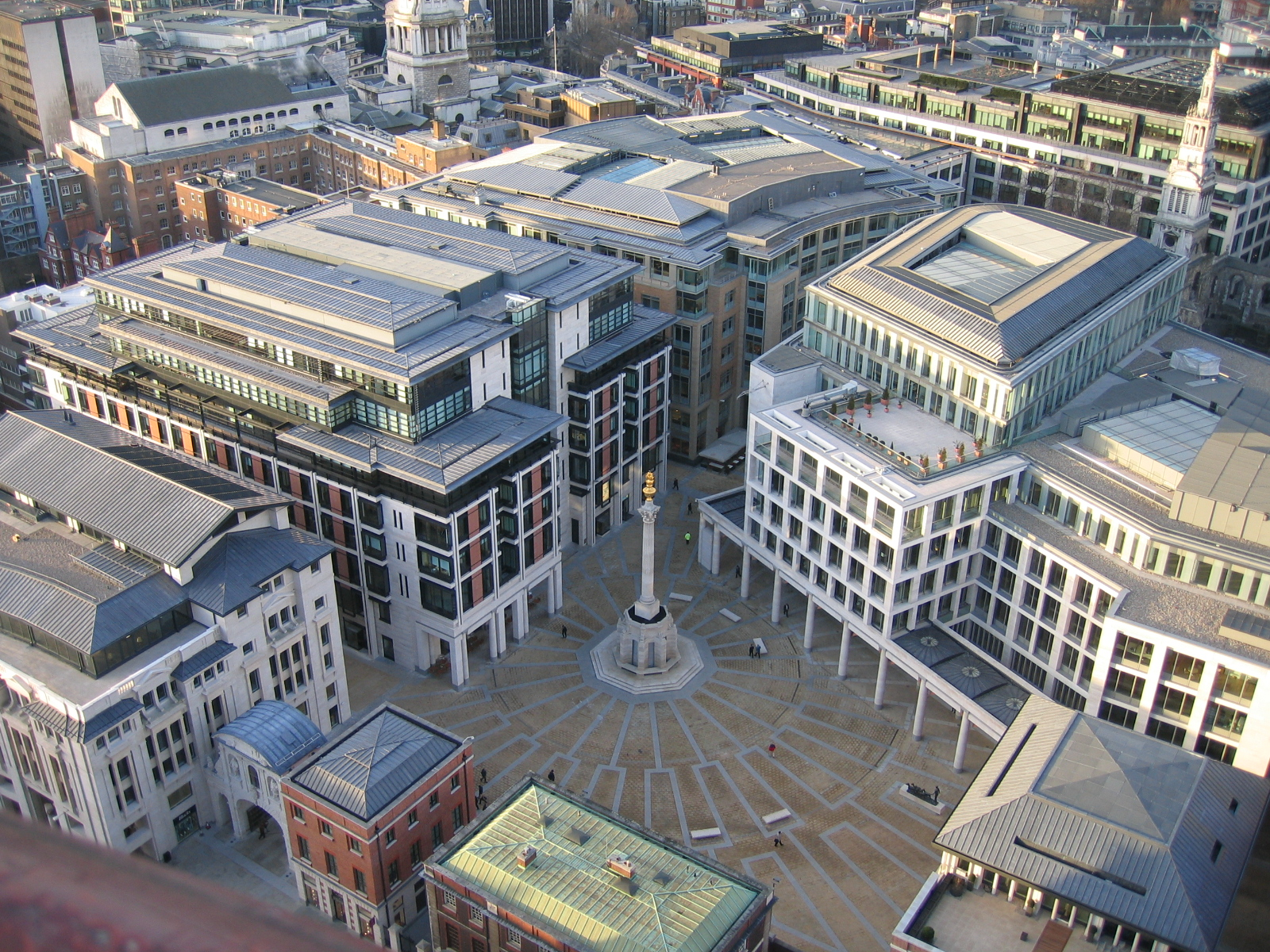
- Paternoster Square, redeveloped in 2003, is near St Paul's Cathedral.

- Location within Greater London
- Namesake: Paternoster Row
- Type: Urban development
- Coordinates: 51°30′53″N 0°5′58″W

Other
- Known for: Location of the London Stock Exchange
- Website: www.paternosterlondon.co.uk

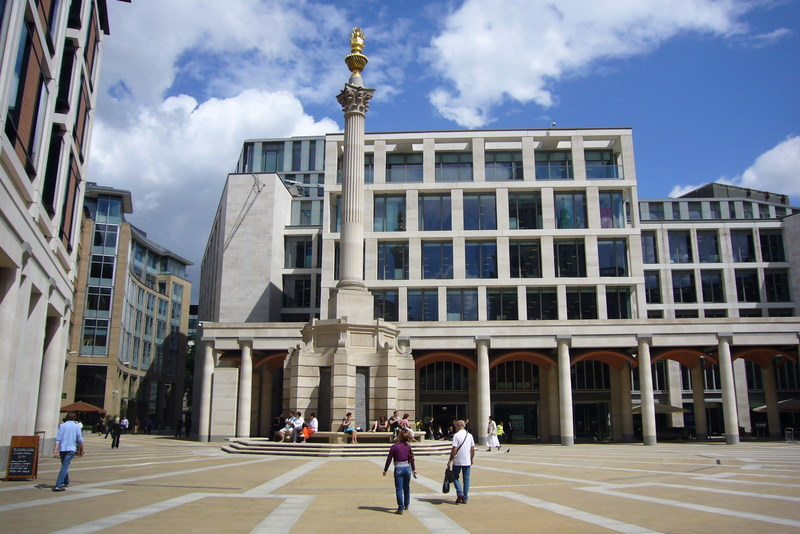
Paternoster Square

Paternoster Square is a former historic square, renamed from Newgate Market c. 1872, and now a post-war urban redevelopment next to St Paul's Cathedral in the City of London. The area was previously named Paternoster Row, after the street of the same name, once centre of the London publishing trade and was devastated by aerial bombardment in The Blitz during World War II. It is now the location of the London Stock Exchange which relocated there from Threadneedle Street in 2004. It is also the location of investment banks such as Goldman Sachs, Merrill and Nomura Securities, and of fund manager Fidelity Investments. The square itself, i.e. the plaza, is privately owned public space. In 2004, Christopher Wren's 1669 Temple Bar Gate was re-erected here as an entrance way to the plaza.

The square is near the top of a modest rise known as Ludgate Hill, formerly one of the two highest points in the City of London. It is characterised by its pedestrianisation and colonnades.

== Historic square ==
The historic square was formerly the site of Newgate Market, a meat market serving much of London. By the late nineteenth century it was called Paternoster Square, taking the name from Paternoster Row. It was accessed on the north by Rose Street (originally Roe Street), the west by White Hart Street and the south and east by alleys, which came out in the centre of the sides of the square. In comparison, the modern, extended, White Hart Street meets a longer Rose Street (which now runs just west of the original square) north of the current Paternoster Square. The only area the old and new square have in common is a small strip outside Warwick Court, where part of the building is set further back.

== World War II bombing ==
The City of London was hit by one of the heaviest night raids of The Blitz on the night of 29 December 1940. Buildings on Paternoster Row, housing the publishing companies Simpkin & Marshall, Hutchinsons, Blackwood, Longman and Collins were destroyed. St Paul's Cathedral remained intact.

== 1960s rebuilding ==
In 1956, the Corporation of London published Sir William Holford's proposals for redeveloping the precinct north of St Paul's Cathedral. Holford's report attempted to resolve problems of traffic flow in the vicinity of the cathedral, while protecting the cathedral's presence as a national monument on some of the highest ground of the City, at the top of Ludgate Hill, on the north bank of the River Thames. The report was controversial, however, because it introduced a decisively modern note alongside the foremost work of Britain's foremost 17th-century architect, Christopher Wren.

Rebuilding was carried out between 1961 and 1967, but it involved only part of Holford's concept — the area of Paternoster Square between St Paul's churchyard and Newgate Street — and this included undistinguished buildings by other architects and the omission of some of Holford's features. Robert Finch, the Lord Mayor of London, wrote of it in The Guardian in 2004, that it was made up of "ghastly, monolithic constructions without definition or character".

== 1980s and 1990s ==
In the late 1980s, many tenants moved to other London sites, resulting in a number of premises being left vacant. That prompted landlords and the City of London to welcome proposals to redevelop the area. In a 1987 speech, King Charles III, then the Prince of Wales, criticised the 1960s redevelopment and a proposed scheme for the Square by high-tech architect Richard Rogers. "Even the street where Shakespeare and Milton brought their manuscripts, the legendary Paternoster Row, ‘The Row’, the very heart of publishing since Elizabethan times, was turned into a concrete service road leading to an underground car park!... Clausewitz called war the continuation of diplomacy by other means. Around St Paul’s, planning turned out to be the continuation of war by other means". In 1990, architect John Simpson developed a scheme, sponsored by a newspaper competition and championed by the Prince. It featured classically inspired architecture, which would have been sympathetic with the nearby cathedral.

In 1996, permission was granted for a master plan by Sir William Whitfield, which was finally built. The development was implemented by developers, Stanhope plc and Mitsubishi Estate. By October 2003, the redeveloped square was complete, lined with buildings by Whitfield's firm among others. Among the first new tenants was the London Stock Exchange.

== Occupy London and public space controversy ==
The London Stock Exchange was the initial target for the protesters of Occupy London on 15 October 2011. Attempts to occupy Paternoster Square were thwarted by police, Police sealed off the entrance to Paternoster Square. A High Court injunction had been granted against public access to the square, defining it as private property. The square was repeatedly described as 'public space' in the plans for Paternoster Square, meaning the public is granted access but does not designate the square as a right of way under English law, thus the owner can limit access at any time.

== Monuments and sculpture ==
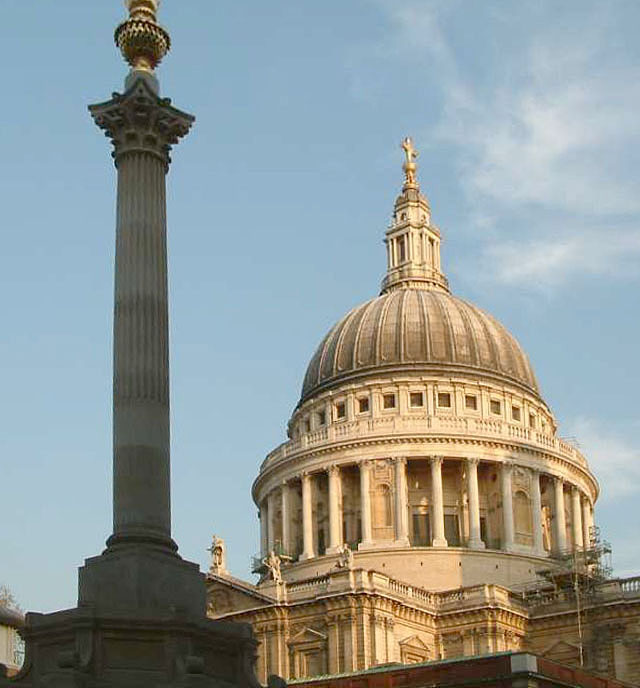
St Paul's Cathedral dome and the Paternoster Square Column, from Paternoster Square

The main monument in the redeveloped square is the 75 feet (23 m) tall Paternoster Square Column. It is a Corinthian column of Portland stone topped by a gold leaf covered flaming copper urn, which is illuminated by fibre-optic lighting at night. The column was designed by William Whitfield's firm Whitfield Partners, and also serves as a ventilation shaft for a service road that runs beneath the square.

At the north end of the square is the bronze Paternoster (also known as Shepherd and Sheep) by Dame Elisabeth Frink. The statue was commissioned for the previous Paternoster Square complex in 1975, and was given a new plinth following the redevelopment. Another sculpture in the adjoining Paternoster Lane is Paternoster Vents by Thomas Heatherwick.

Temple Bar Gate, a Wren-designed stone archway constructed between 1669 and 1672 on Fleet Street at Temple Bar (the historic western ceremonial entrance to the City), has been in front of the cathedral side entrance since 2004. Contractors were paid £3,000,000 to restore it and move it from a site in Theobalds Park by the Corporation of London, which received donations from the Temple Bar Trust and more than one livery company. Its original site on Fleet Street, where it stood until 1878, is occupied by the Temple Bar Memorial.
