= Direction =

Direction may refer to:

- Body relative direction, for instance left, right, forward, backwards, up, and down
  - Anatomical terms of location for those used in anatomy
  - List of ship directions
- Cardinal direction
- Bearing (navigation)

== Mathematics and science ==
- Direction vector, a unit vector that defines a direction in multidimensional space
- Direction of a subspace of a Euclidean or affine space
- Directed set, in order theory
- Directed graph, in graph theory
- Directionality (molecular biology), the orientation of a nucleic acid

== Music ==
- For the guidance and cueing of a group of musicians during performance, see conducting
- Direction (album) a 2007 album by The Starting Line
- Direction Records, a label began by Bobby Darin.
- Direction (record label), a record label in the UK in the late 1960s, a subsidiary of CBS Records, specialising in soul music
- Directions: The Plans Video Album, a DVD video album made of videos inspired by songs from indie rock/pop band Death Cab for Cutie's album Plans
- Directions (Miles Davis album), 1981
- Directions (PC Quest album), 1992
- Directions (Norman Blake album), 1978
- "Direction", a song by the band Interpol, released as a B-side off the Six Feet Under soundtrack

== Other uses ==
- Directions (film), a 2017 Bulgarian film
- Film direction, the creative aspect of filmmaking
- Stage direction, in theater
- Writing direction, of writing systems
- See Alexander technique for Direction, a concept in the Alexander Technique
- Directions (delegated legislation), a form of delegated legislation
- Direction – Social Democracy, a major political party in Slovakia
- Directionality (Cetanā), a mental factor in Buddhism

== See also ==
- Director (disambiguation)
