= Lantern House =

Residential building in Manhattan, New York

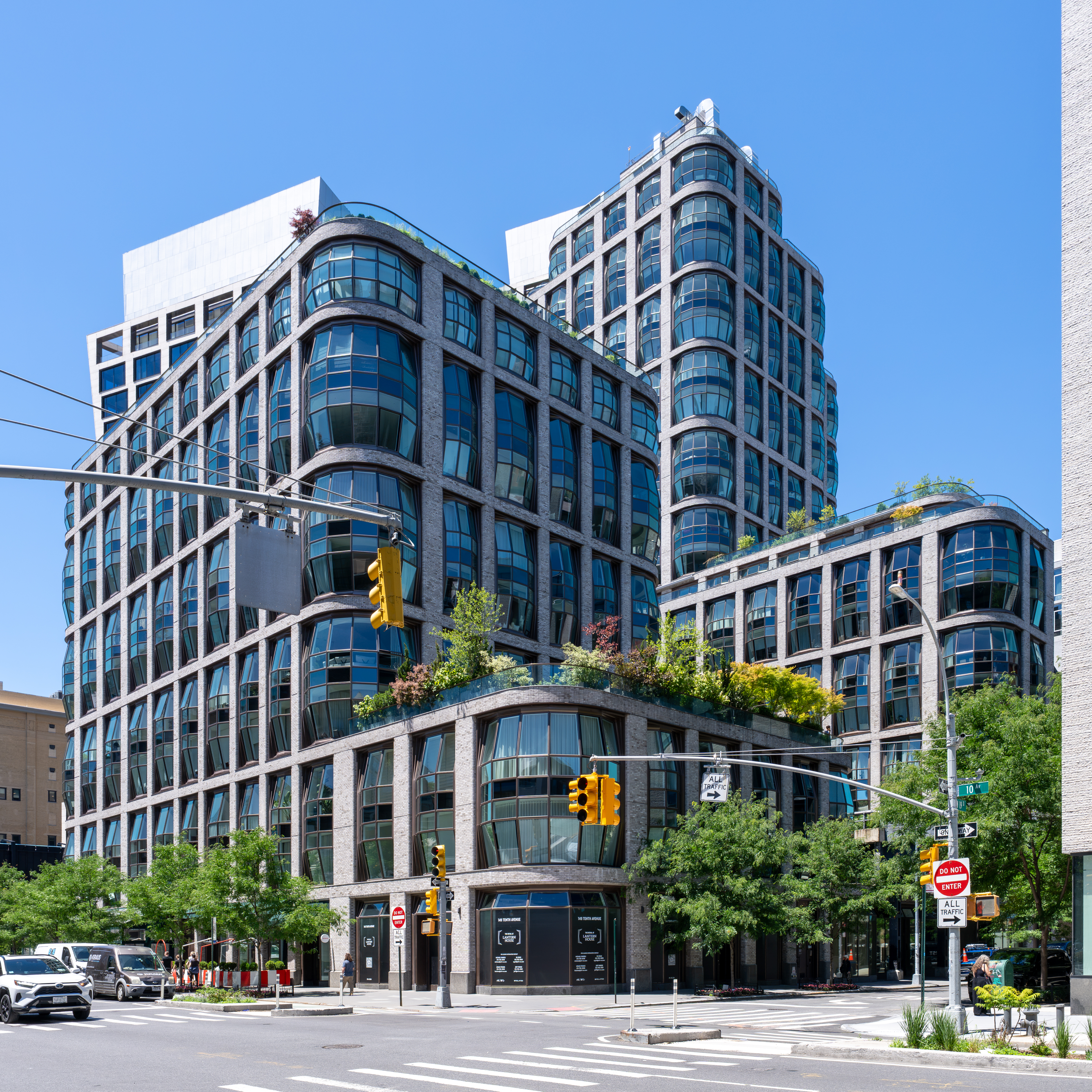
- Lantern House (2026)
- Interactive map of the Lantern House area

General information
- Status: Completed
- Classification: Residential
- Coordinates: 40°44′42″N 74°00′23″W

Design and construction
- Architect: Thomas Heatherwick
- Developer: Related Companies

Lantern House is a residential development in Chelsea, Manhattan, New York City. The building was designed by Thomas Heatherwick and developed by Related Companies.

== History and development ==
Related paid $205 million for the site in 2014. The earliest permits for work on the site were filed in 2016. Massings for the project were revealed in 2017. Designs for the structures were first published by the press in early 2018. Reporting has connected Lantern House to another Related development at 555 West 22nd Street, designed by Robert A.M. Stern Architects, referring to them jointly as "Hudson Residences".

The building was completed in September 2021.

== Design ==
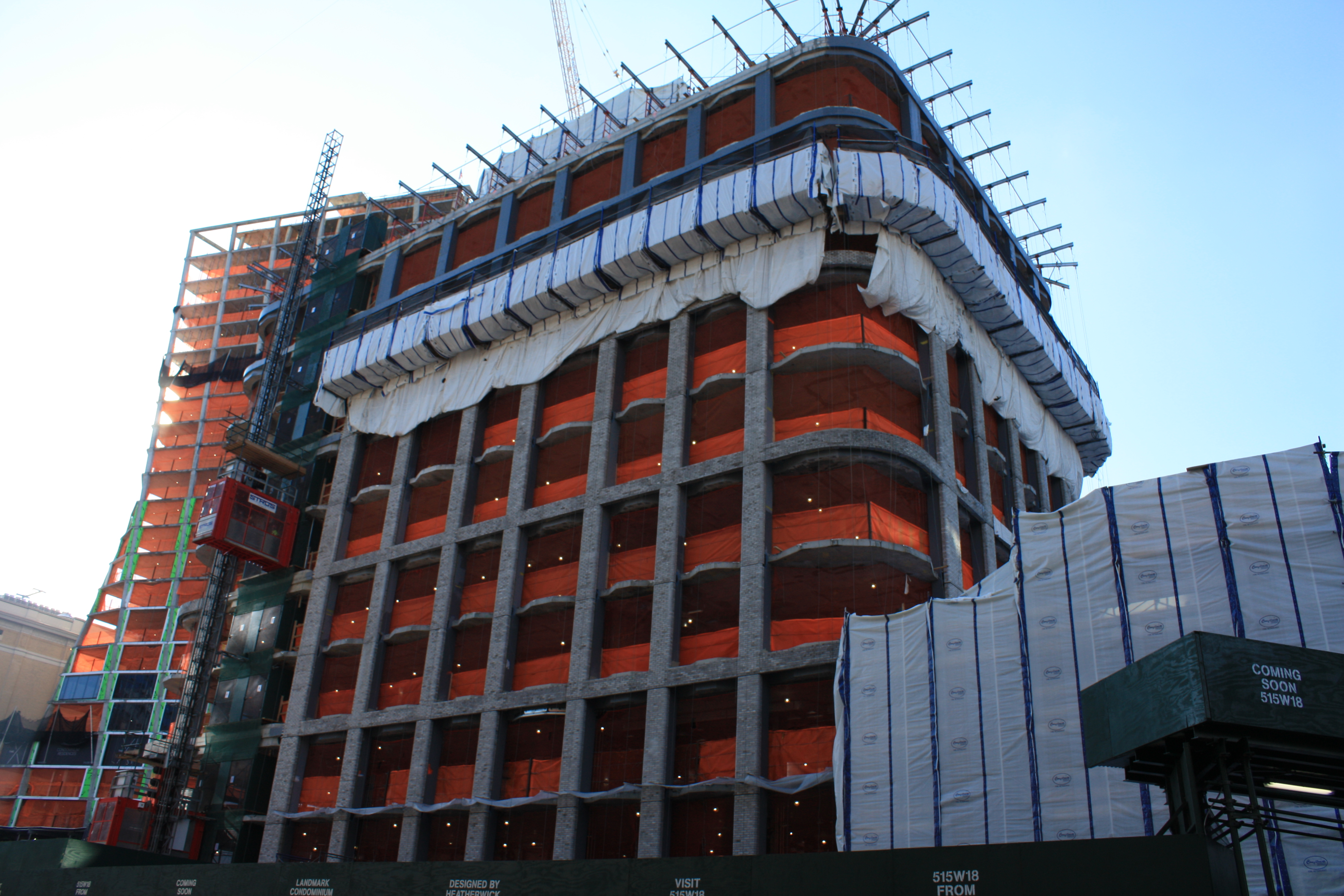
The building under construction in March 2019

The building's windows inspired the name of the development, as they evoke the shape of a lantern, though they have also been unfavorably compared to pickle and beer barrels. Heatherwick was inspired in part by bay windows he has seen in Victorian homes. Heatherwick also drew inspiration from industrial warehouses located in Manhattan and elsewhere in New York, from which he derived the building's brick façade.

The High Line park bisects the two structures that form the building, though a lobby joins them at street level. March & White designed the building's interiors.

=== Architectural reception ===
Eva Hagberg, writing for Curbed criticized the building as "one idea about a window, repeated", further calling the bay windows a "gimmick gone too far". In another Curbed article about new buildings near the High Line and their design, an anonymous architect was quoted, referring to the building as "a disaster" and "the nail in the coffin" for the architectural character of the area. Another anonymous architect gave Heatherwick some praise for the design's apparent nod to the nearby industrial buildings that date to before the High Line's conversion from railroad to park.

== Usage ==
The building is residential, with 181 condominium units.

The building also contains an Italian restaurant, Cucina Alba. The restaurant opened in 2022.
