= Paternoster Vents =

Sculpture by Thomas Heatherwick in London

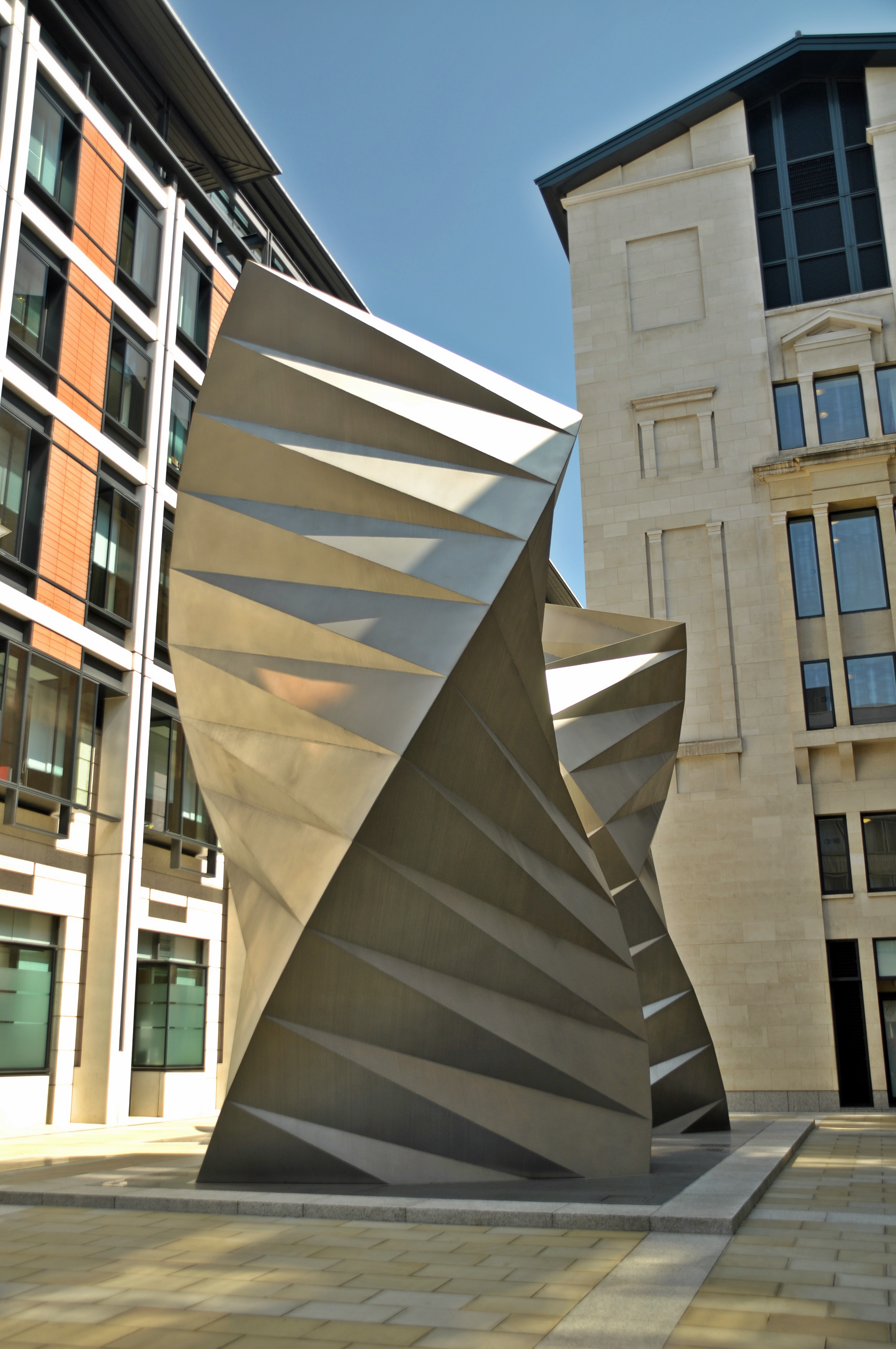
- The sculpture in 2013
- Artist: Thomas Heatherwick
- Year: 2002
- Type: Sculpture
- Medium: Stainless steel
- Location: London, United Kingdom; 51.514339°N 0.100462°W

Paternoster Vents, sometimes referred to as simply Vents and also known as Angel's Wings, is an outdoor 2002 stainless steel sculpture by Thomas Heatherwick, installed Paternoster Lane on the west side of the Paternoster Square development in London, United Kingdom, close to the junction of Warwick Lane and Ave Maria Lane with Amen Corner. The sculpture provides ventilation for an underground electrical substation.

It has been described by The Guardian as "one of Thomas Heatherwick’s earliest and most successful projects". It won Design and Art Directions' "wood pencil" award for design in 2002.

The sculpture was commissioned by Stanhope and Mitsubishi Estate, who jointly developed the Paternoster Square site, to provide ventilation for a subsurface electrical substation with four electricity transformers under Bishop’s Court on the west side of the development. Thomas Heatherwick's design reduces the physical mass of the structure as originally conceived, with metal grilles integrated into the paving allow ingress of cool air, with warm air flowing out through the two tall vents which form wings that mirror each other. Each wing comprises 63 isosceles triangles of stainless steel about 6 mm (0.24 in) thick, assembled into a monocoque helical form that stands about 11 m (36 ft) high. The design was inspired by origami experiments from folding pieces of A4 paper. The outer surface was given a satin finish by shot blasting with glass beads.

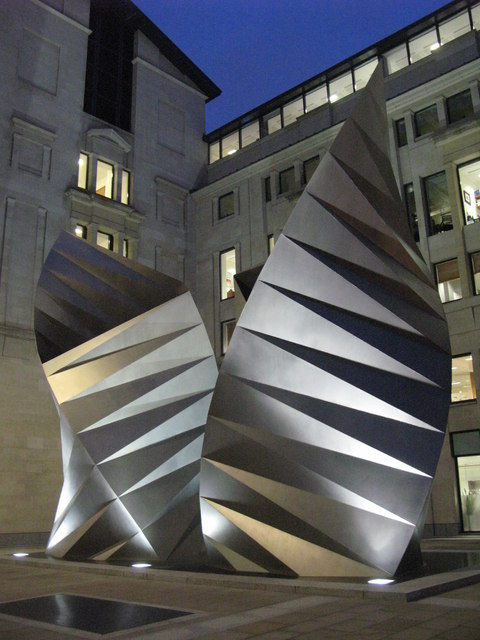
Sculpture at night in 2009

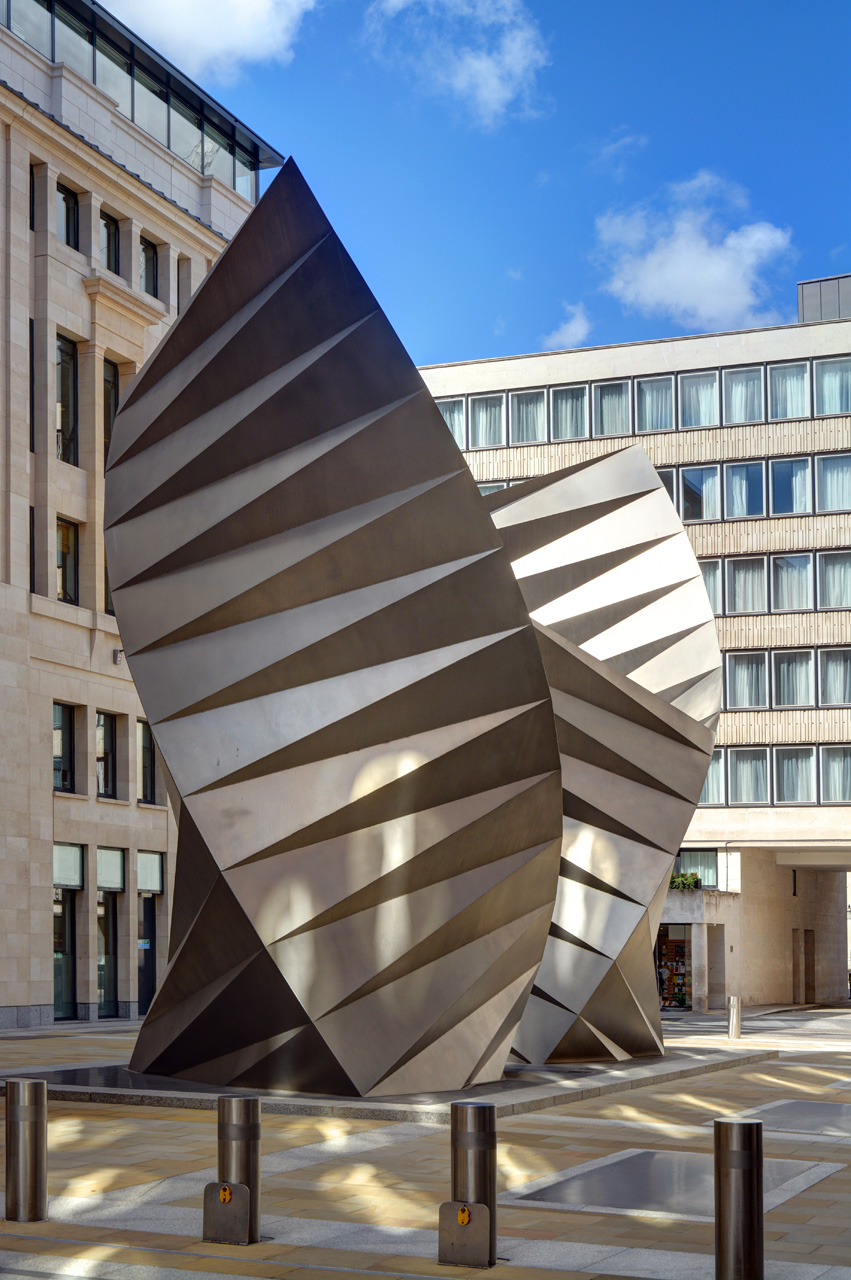
Sculpture in 2014

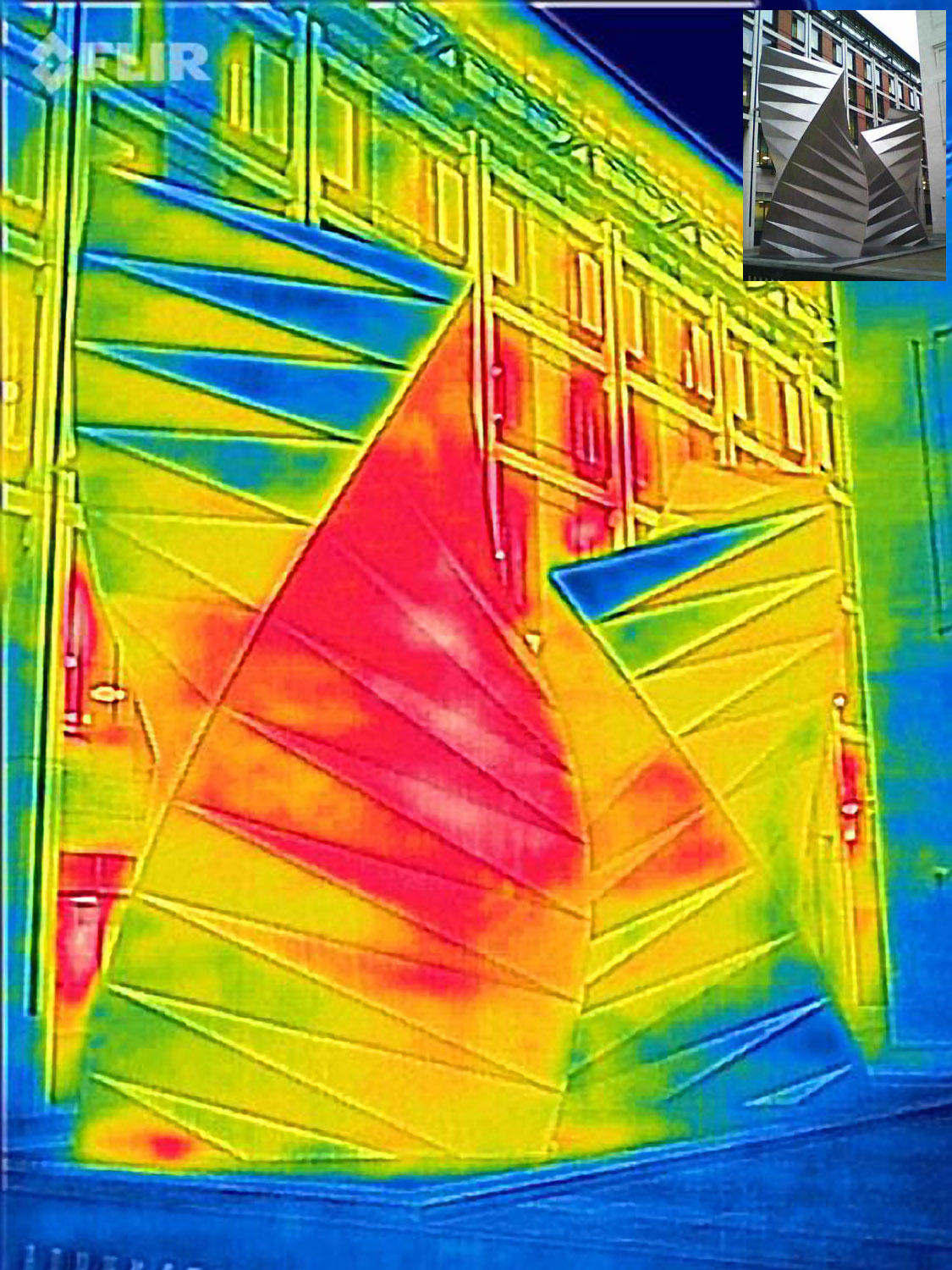
Thermal infrared image

== See also ==
- 2002 in art
- List of public art in the City of London
