= Pc Quest (album) =

pc Quest

Studio album by pc Quest
- Released: July 9, 1991
- Recorded: 1990–1991
- Genre: Pop rock
- Label: Headliner/RCA
- Producer: George Tobin in association with Mike Piccirillo & John Duarte

Pc Quest chronology
pc Quest (1991)	Directions (1992)

Professional ratings
Review scores
Source	Rating
AllMusic	3/5 stars

pc Quest is the 1991 self-titled first album by the group pc Quest. The album contains two Billboard Hot 100 hit singles ("After the Summer's Gone"(#41) and "Can I Call You My Girl"(#58)). Most of the songs were written by one or both of the songwriting team Tim James and Steven McClintock (best known for their work with 1980s pop singer Tiffany).

== Track listing ==
1. "After The Summer's Gone" - 4:04 (Tim James, Mike Piccirillo)
2. "Don't Be Afraid" - 3:53 (Steven McClintock, Tim James, John Duarte)
3. "Can I Call You My Girl?" - 3:56 (Steven McClintock, Tim James, John Duarte, Monty Brinkley)
4. "Show Me" - 3:33 (Mike Piccirillo, Tim James)
5. "The Hardest Part (Is Being Young)" - 4:07 (Steven McClintock, Tim James, John Duarte)
6. "I'm Still Cold" - 3:46 (Tim James, Eric Winer, Mike Piccirillo)
7. "Just Forget About 'Em" - 5:07 (Monty Brinkley)
8. "Can't You See?" - 3:53 (Steven McClintock, Tim James, John Duarte, Monty Brinkley)
9. "Loverboy" - 3:14 (Drew Nichols, Steve Petree, Mike Piccirillo)
10. "Ready, Aim, Dance!" - 4:04 (Steven McClintock, Tim James, John Duarte)

== Singles ==
- "Can I Call You My Girl" (RCA 62018) - Debuted on the Billboard Hot 100 on May 4, 1991. Top 50 CHR. #58 Hot 100.
- "After the Summer's Gone" (Geffen/Warner Bros 19656 and RCA 62051 & RDAB62075)- Debuted on the Billboard Hot 100 August 17, 1991. Top 40 CHR and Top 40 R&B. #41 Hot 100. Single #RDAB62075 contained four different mixes of the song.

== Members ==
- Chad Petree
- Stephen Petree
- Drew Nichols
- Kim Whipkey
