= Ministerial direction =

A ministerial direction is a formal instruction issued by a government minister in the United Kingdom to proceed with spending over an objection by the civil service that it breaches certain criteria, most commonly that of value for money.

They are distinct from Directions, a form of delegated legislation issued by a minister to a public body.

== Legal process ==
While ministers set policy for their departments, including allocating spending, the civil service is also required to ensure that all proposed spending meets four criteria:

1. Regularity: the department has the legal power and the agreed budget;
2. Propriety: it is within expectations of good practice and parliamentary control;
3. Value for money: it is not an inefficient use of public funds;
4. Feasibility: it can be implemented in time and effectively.

If a proposed course of action breaches one or more of these grounds, then the departmental accounting officer - usually the permanent secretary - should object in writing. The minister then has the power to issue a formal ministerial direction to proceed with the policy despite these objections. This direction is published, and a copy provided to the Treasury and to the Comptroller and Auditor General, who can consider whether to investigate the decision.

Many directions are published promptly, but prior to 2011 they could be kept secret for prolonged periods, and prior to the early 1990s did not have to be published at all. Under current rules, publication can be delayed no longer than the next annual accounts. This requires approval, but allows a delay in cases where publishing it immediately might harm the recipient or have other undesirable effects.

The requirement for "feasibility" was only adopted in 2011 (and first invoked in 2018), while the "value for money" grounds were adopted in the 1990s following the Pergau Dam affair - prior to this the requirement was looser, saying that public spending should be "prudent and economical".

The devolved administrations in Scotland, Wales and Northern Ireland have broadly similar systems for requesting ministerial directions, though Northern Ireland adds a second stage where approval must also be gained from the Minister of Finance, or the Executive as a whole if the decision may affect other areas of government.

== Use of directions ==
The use of ministerial directions varies over time. 104 directions were issued between 1990 and April 2024, a quarter of which were in the three years 2020-22; none were issued in 2011-2014. Before 1990 very few were made public, and so the numbers issued are not known, but are believed to be low. They are more common in some departments than others - most prominently defence, business/trade, and transport. The majority invoke value for money as a criteria, followed by propriety and regularity; feasibility, as the newest requirement, has only been invoked rarely. The level of spending involved can also vary dramatically. The directions issued during the 2008 financial crisis or the COVID-19 pandemic approved tens of billions of pounds in spending, while one Ministry of Defence direction was issued to authorise £500 being spent on travel that did not fit in normal expenditure rules.

In a 2016 report the National Audit Office identified concerns that directions had not been requested in a number of cases where there were substantial value-for-money risks, such as the failed FiReControl emergency services reorganisation, and that there was no statutory duty on accounting officers to formally report concerns about expenditure, unlike the system which exists at local government level. In addition, some civil servants were concerned that requesting a direction could indicate a breakdown in their working relationship with ministers, or be seen as an attempt to block policy decisions.

While the Treasury provides advice to civil servants who are concerned and considering requesting a direction, there are no statistics on how often these discussions happen. However, some former civil servants have identified that the 'threat' of asking for a direction can help focus decision-making or encourage other options to be considered.

In the devolved administrations, ministerial directions have been much more widely used in the Northern Ireland Executive than the Welsh Government and the Scottish Government.
