= Directions (PC Quest album) =

Studio album by PC Quest
- Released: 1992
- Recorded: January – May 1992
- Genres: Pop; rock
- Labels: Headliner Records, RCA 66057-2
- Producers: George Tobin in association with John Duarte and Mike Piccirillo

PC Quest chronology
PC Quest (1991)	Directions (1992)

Professional ratings
Review scores
Source	Rating
Allmusic	2.5/5 stars

Directions is the 1992 second album by the Billboard 100 charting group PC Quest. Like their first album, most of the songs were written by one or both of the songwriting team of Tim James and Steven McClintock (best known for their work with 1980s pop singer Tiffany). Tiffany would later re-record a few of these songs on her 1993 Dreams Never Die album which was also produced by George Tobin.

== Track listing ==
1. "Cathy's Clown" (Don Everly) – 3:29
2. "If Love Is Blind" (Steve McClintock, Tim James) – 3:42
3. "I Have to go on Alone" (Tim James, Mike Piccirillo) – 3:35
4. "(She's Not) A Bad Girl" (Mike Piccirillo) – 4:27
5. "Almost in Love" (Tim James, Mike Piccirillo) – 4:31
6. "Nothing but a Fool" (Barbara Amesbury) – 5:01
7. "We Could Be Trouble" (Tim James, Mike Piccirillo) – 3:36
8. "Can't You See?" (Steve McClintock, Tim James, John Duarte, Monty Brinkley) – 3:48
9. "Life Goes On" (Tim James, Mike Piccirillo) – 3:54
10. "I Wanna Touch You" (Steve McClintock, Tim James, John Duarte) – 4:36
11. "It Must Be Love" (Chad Petree, Steve Petree, Drew Nichols, Kim Whipkey, John Duarte) – 5:10

== Personnel ==
- Lynn Bugai – stylist
- John Duarte – arranger, keyboards, programming, producer, string arrangements, mixing
- Caroline Greyshock – photography
- Steve Hall – mastering
- Dan Higgins – saxophone
- Chuck Hohn – engineer
- Keith Howland – guitar
- James Jowers – engineer
- Ria Lewerke – art direction
- Drew Nichols – guitar
- Helena Occhipinti – make-up, hair stylist
- PC Quest – vocals (background)
- Mike Piccirillo – musician
- Carol Roy – logo design
- Robert Russell – engineer, digital editing, mixing
- George Tobin – producer
- Kirt Wan – scratching
- Mark Wolfson – engineer
