= Direction (delegated legislation) =

Directions are a form of delegated legislation used in the United Kingdom and Australia.

== United Kingdom ==
An Act of Parliament or other delegated legislation may confer a power on a Minister to give Directions so as to enable that Minister to give instructions to a public body or group of public bodies which are not under the Minister's direct control. The directions thereby effectively convert instructions which would otherwise only have strong political weight to legally binding orders with which the recipient must comply.

Because they are generally of interest to a relatively limited group of public bodies, Directions are not generally made in the form of Statutory Instruments, but are instead published or notified to the affected bodies as the Minister sees fit. One exception to this is The Exception from the Duty to Publish (Department for Business and Trade) (No. 1) Direction 2023.

Examples of such Directions include:

- Directions given by the Secretary of State for Health to the National Health Service,
- Directions given the Secretrary of State for Transport to the Strategic Rail Authority,
- Directions given by the Treasury to public bodies on their financial and accounting procedures.

However some Directions are published by Statutory Instrument because they have a wider application or constitutional relevance. Examples include:

- The Wafer Scottish Seal Directions 1999 under which the First Minister of Scotland gives instructions concerning the Great Seal of Scotland,
- The Traffic Signs General Directions 2002 which give instructions to highways authorities about road signs.

They are distinct from ministerial directions, which are formal directions to proceed requested by civil servants should a spending proposal fail to meet the criteria for appropriate public spending.
