= Pc Quest (band) =

Pop group

pc Quest
- Also known as: PC Quest, Pc Quest, etc
- Origin: Tulsa, Oklahoma, United States
- Genres: Pop; rock; dance
- Years active: 1990–1992
- Labels: Giant Records; Geffen Records; Headlinerecords; RCA Records
- Past members: Chad Petree; Stephen Petree; Drew Nichols; Kim Whipkey

pc Quest was a pop music group in the 1990s from Oklahoma. They were managed by George Tobin, best known for managing Tiffany, and Tim James, one half of the duo Rock Mafia. They were featured in Bop and Teen Beat magazine as teen idols.

The quartet was originally signed to Geffen Records in 1990, but an initial release of "After The Summer's Gone" that fall to Contemporary hit radio stations through both Geffen and Giant Records failed to chart. Months later, now signed to Tobin's Headlinerecords and RCA Records, their "Can I Call You My Girl?" became a minor hit, followed by a reissue of "After The Summer's Gone", which narrowly missed the top 40 on the Billboard Hot 100. A 1992 follow-up album failed to yield any hits, and the group parted ways.

Group member Chad Petree would find success years later as one of the leaders of indie rock band Shiny Toy Guns, with brother Stephen credited as a writer on several of the band's songs.

== Members ==
- Chad Petree
- Stephen Petree
- Drew Nichols
- Kim Whipkey

== Discography ==
- pc Quest (1991)
- Directions (1992)

=== Singles ===
List of singles, with chart positions
Title	Year	Peak chart position	Album
Title	Year	US	Album
"Can I Call You My Girl"	1991	58	pc Quest
"Can't You See"	1991	–	pc Quest
"After the Summer's Gone"	1991	41	pc Quest
"I Have To Go On Alone"	1992	–	Directions
