= Sara Fanelli =

British artist and illustrator

- Born: 20 July 1969 (age 57); Florence, Italy
- Education: Camberwell College of Art; Royal College of Art
- Occupations: Artist and illustrator

Sara Fanelli (born 20 July 1969) is a British artist and illustrator, best known for her children's picture books.

== Early life ==
Fanelli was born in Florence.She came to London to study art at Camberwell College of Art and then the Royal College of Art where she graduated in 1995.

== Career ==
She divides her time between illustration work, books and self-generated projects. She has written and illustrated children's books which have been published in many languages and have earned her international awards and commendations. She has won several international awards including twice being the overall winner of the Victoria and Albert Museum Illustration Award. She won the D&AD Silver Awards for a postage stamp in 2000, for poster design in 2003, and for her book "Sometimes I think, sometimes I am" in 2008.

Sara Fanelli became an HonRDI in 2006, the first woman illustrator to be awarded this honour. Member of AGI since 2000.

In 2006 Sara Fanelli was commissioned by Tate Modern to design their four permanent collection gallery entrances and a 40 metres long Timeline of 20th Century artists. This art installation was published in April 2012 on STUDIO Architecture and Urbanism magazine, edited by Romolo Calabrese, in its issue#02 Original.

My Map Book is Fanelli's work most widely held in WorldCat libraries by a margin nearly 2-to-1. The picture book with one folded map in a pocket was published in 1995 by All Books for Children (one "ABC Books") and within the year by HarperCollins (OCLC 31938614), later reissued by Walker Books. At the annual conference of the Children's Literature Association in June 2014, it was named next year's winner of the Phoenix Picture Book Award, which annually recognizes the best picture book that did not win a major award 20 years earlier. "Books are considered not only for the quality of their illustrations, but for the way pictures and text work together."

== Books ==
- Button (London: ABC, 1994)
- My Map Book (ABC, 1995)
- Pinocchio Picture Box; Cinderella Picture Box (ABC, 1996)
- Wolf! (Heinemann, 1997)
- A Dog's Life (Heinemann, 1998); US edition, The Doggy Book (Running Press, 1998)
- It's Dreamtime (Heinemann, 1999)
- Dear Diary (Walker Books, 2000)
- First Flight (Jonathan Cape, 2002)
- Mythological Monsters of Ancient Greece (Walker, 2002)
- Pinocchio (Walker, 2003) – an edition of Carlo Collodi, The Adventures of Pinocchio (orig. 1883, Italian), OCLC 51848324 (Note: In April 2014, at least in Australia and New Zealand, Walker released an edition of the same classic in a different unabridged translation, with illustrations by Robert Ingpen, The Adventures of Pinocchio (NSW: Walker, 2014).)
- Sometimes I think, Sometimes I am (Tate Publishing, 2007)
- The Onion's Great Escape (Phaidon Press, 2012) – a movable book

=== Children's poetry collections and anthologies ===
Sources:

- Dibby Dubby Dhu and other poems, by George Barker (Faber and Faber, 1997)
- All Sorts: poems, by Christopher Reid (London: Ondt & Gracehoper, 1999)
- Alphabicycle Order, poetry by Reid (Ondt & Gracehoper, 2001)
- The New Faber Book of Children's Verse, ed. Matthew Sweeney (Faber, 2001); reissued 2003 as The New Faber Book of Children's Verse
- Sensational!: poems inspired by the five senses, selected by Roger McGough (Macmillan Children's, 2004) OCLC 60416676
