= Tom Takayoshi =

- Occupations: Record producer, Record executive
- Years active: 1960s – 2000s
- Labels: Capitol Records; Playboy Records; Hilltak Records

Tom Takayoshi was a record label founder as well as a president of a major United States record label. His involvement in the music industry goes back to the early 1960s.

== Background ==
=== Abkco Records ===
At some time, possibly the early 1970s Takayoshi was an executive for Abkco Records.

=== Capitol Records ===
In the early 1960s Takayoshi was operations manager for the Detroit branch of Capitol Records. In 1963 he was involved in a prank on radio station DJs in Detroit and Windsor. To promote the song "Sukiyaki" by Kyu Sakamoto. Takayoshi put on a Japanese costume, posing as Mio Takayoshi, pretending to be a long time friend of the singer. He toured the radio stations thanking the DJs for their help in promoting the song while pretending not to understand or speak English. In addition to Takayoshi, the hoax was co-engineered by men from the Capitol Records branch, sales manager Jim Blackwood, district sales manager Tom Gelardi and regional promotion man Art Hill. In 1969 he won the district sales award for his work in Detroit with Larry Menetre of Atlanta getting the other one and Marvin Beisel of the West Coast getting the first division plaque. In the same year, he was named director of independent labels at Capitol. His role was to head a team of seven men to handle promotions for independent labels. The labels he was to oversee were Apple, Zapple, 1-2-3, Harvest, Hand, Colossal, Tower, Crazy Horse, Burdette, Showtown and Uptown.

He stayed with the label for 13 years.

=== Apple Records ===
In the early 1970s he was a promotion man for Apple Records. He stayed with the Apple label for around two years.

=== Playboy Records ===
He then joined Playboy Records. In early 1973, he was named marketing director of sales and promotion. Around 1974, he was executive vice-president for Playboy Records. While in that role he signed country singer Eddie Weaver to the label. In the mid 1970s the label had lost four million dollars, Takayoshi was given the power to run the label and there was an expectation to see a profit in sales. There was a desire to make it a major label for r&b acts. He was the man in charge of the label and the third man in that position in three years. Under his stewardship, the label did well with country artist Mickey Gilley. In 1976, it was mentioned in the Radio Quarterly Report, Vol II July 1 - Sept. 30 edition that to date, Playboys biggest successes were Barbie Benton, Al Wilson, Weapons of Peace, Hamilton, Joe Frank & Reynolds and Mickey Gilley. Takayoshi, since taking over had turned the company around by being more selective and causing it to change direction. In 1977 it was announced in the March 19 edition of Billboard Magazine that Takayoshi, after being with the label for four years was made president. In 1978, Playboy Records folded.

Along with Albert Tribble, Larry Brownlee, Lowrell Simon and Willie Henderson he is credited as a co-composer for Henderson's single "Gangster Boogie Bump" which peaked at #50 on the US r&b charts in 1974.

=== Hilltak Records ===
Towards the late 1970s Takayoshi along with Hillery Johnson co founded Hilltak Records. The name Hilltak was a combination of their names. It was registered June 16, 1978, in California. The Hilltak label was a subsidiary of Atlantic Records. It's catalogue had a leaning towards the disco genre. They got off to a great start with albums, Magic Man by Broadway and Choice by Dalton & Dubarri. Some of the other artists that had their work released on the label were Patti Hendrix, The Guess Who, and The 9th Creation. Hendrix had success with her single in 1978 which peaked at #65 on September 23 on the Billboard Hot Soul Singles chart. It also spent a total of ten weeks in the chart. Broadway would have chart success with two singles, including "Kiss You All Over". 9th Creation would have success with "Let's Dance".

In September 1979 the label had shifted from Atlantic Records to use a network of nine independent distributors which included California Records in L.A. and Big State in Dallas. Also that year, "On the Inside" by Lynne Hamilton was released on Hilltak.

By 1980, Takayoshi was working as general manager for Sound Music Sales in Los Angeles.
