= Roots Mural Theme / Many Rains Ago (Oluwa) =

Song by Weapons of Peace
- A-side: "Roots Mural Theme / Many Rains Ago (Oluwa)"
- B-side: "Life's (About To Get Me Down)"
- Released: 1977
- Length: 3:50
- Label: Playboy P-6101
- Composer(s): Gerald Fried, Quincy Jones, Caiphus Semenya
- Producer(s): Bill Traut, Finis Henderson Jr.

Weapons of Peace singles chronology
"City" (1976)	"Roots Mural Theme / Many Rains Ago (Oluwa)" (1977)

"Roots Mural Theme / Many Rains Ago (Oluwa)" was a 1977 single for Chicago band Weapons of Peace. It became a chart hit for them that year.

== Background ==
"Roots Mural Theme / Many Rains Ago (Oluwa)" was written by Caiphus Semenya, Gerald Fried and Quincy Jones. It recorded by Weapons of Peace and released on Playboy in 1977. It was their version of the TV series, Roots theme. The A side was produced by Bill Traut and Finis Henderson Jr., and the strings were arranged by Richard Evans. The B side "This Life's (About to Get Me Down)" was written by Charles Franklin and Finis Henderson. It was produced by Hillery Johnson.

The single was the first Playboy single to get pushed by the CBS distribution network.

While the single was in the chart, the Quincy Jones version was also in the same chart.

== Reception ==
The single was an R&B Pick of the Week in the 19 March issue of Record World. Columnist Dede Dabney had it as a sleeper in one of her three picks of the week in the issue. She suggested that the song which Quincy Jones had a hand in writing should be listened to and it was destined to cause an explosive reaction.

It was reported in the Chicago Chatter section of the 2 April issue of Cash Box that info provided by Singer One Stop For Ops' Gus Tartol had the single as one of the hot juke box singles of the week.

The single was of one the Picks of the Week in the 9 April issue of Cash Box. At the time the single was already making itself known on the charts. The reviewer said that while preserving the quality of the theme, the release was a record for record's sake interpretation of the familiar theme .

Along with "Just Can't Be That Way (Ruth's Song)", "Roots (Mural Theme / Many Rains Ago (Oluwa)" were the picks when the Weapons of Peace album was reissued on Playboy PZ 34747 in 1977 and reviewed in the 25 June issue of Billboard.

== Airplay ==
For the week of 2 April, Cash Box reported that the single had been added to the playlist of WGIV in Charlotte. It was reported by Cash Box in the 9 April issue that the single was added to the R&B playlist of WAMO in Pittsburgh, and a new addition to the playlist of R&B station WSOK in Savannah. For the week of 16 April as shown by Cash Box, the single had been added to the R&B playlist of KOWH in Omaha.

== Charts ==
The record debuted at no. 92 on the Billboard Hot Soul Singles chart for the week of 9 April. It peaked at no. 90 the following week, its last week of charting.

For the week of 26 April, "Roots Mural Theme / Many Rains Ago (Oluwa)" made its debut at no. 86 in the Cash Box Top 100 R&B chart. At week three on the week of 9 April, it peaked at no. 70 and held that position for another week.
