= Weapons of Peace (album) =

- 1977 reissue cover

Studio album by Weapons of Peace
- Released: 1976
- Length: 36:43; 37:09 (reissue)
- Label: Playboy
- Producer: Mark Davis

Weapons of Peace, also known as Peace Is Our Weapon, Love Is Our Song, is a 1976 album for Chicago soul and funk group Weapons of Peace. The original release contained two of their hit singles, "Just Can't Be That Way (Ruth's Song)" and "City".

== Background ==
The self-titled album, Weapons of Peace was the only album that the Chicago funk soul band released. Released in 1976, it contained eight tracks.

The song "This Life" was composed by Charles P. Franklin, Andrew Hardy, and Finis Henderson Jr., "City" was composed by Charles Franklin, Finis Henderson and Andrew Hardy, "Both Same" was composed by David Johnson, Andrew hardy, Bill Leathers, Finis Henderson Jr., and Finis Henderson, 3rd. "Ruth's Song" was composed by Charles Franklin and Finis Henderson Jr., and "Growin' Stronger" was composed by Andrew Hardy, Lonnell Dantzler, Finis Henderson, 3rd and Finis Henderson Jr. Another song from the album, "Space Child" was written by David Castle. It was originally about Monkees' member Micky Dolenz. Castle, who was on tour with the Monkees saw the spotlight hit Dolenz. And due to Dolenz dabbling in sci-fi writing, Castle wrote a song about him.

The 2 October 1976 issue of Record World ran an article about Playboy Records VP Tom Takayoshi, "Takayoshi Sees Double Sales For Playboy". It stated that Takayoshi had outlined the release of six new albums. Each of them would have their own promotion and merchandising campaign. In addition to releases by Hamilton, Joe Frank & Dennison, Mickey Gilley, Wynn Stewart and Greg Kihn, there would be debut albums by Weapons of Peace and Joey Stec. Also in that issue, the group's single, "Just Can't Be That Way" was charting on the Record World 101–150 chart where it had moved up from 135 to 133.

It was reported by Billboard in the magazine's 4 December issue that Weapons of Peace had released their debut single from album, Peace Is Our Weapon, Love Is Our Song.

== Reception ==
The album was reviewed in the 9 October issue of Cash Box. The reviewer noted that the single "Just Can't Be That Way" was performing well. Referring to the band as a "dynamic new band much in the tradition of Earth, Wind and Fire", the reviewer also said that the tracks were superbly arranged and made note of the multi-rhythm tracks emphasizing the vocals. The suggestion was that any r&b outlet would be foolish to pass up on the album, and for one-stops to make a larger than usual order.

The album was given a three-star rating by AllMusic.

== Airplay ==
The album had been picked up by three r&b stations as shown by Cash Box in the magazine's 2 October issue. It was added to the playlist of KDKO in Denver, XEAZ in San Diego and WSOK in Savannah. Also that week, the song "Just Can't Be That Way" was added to the playlist of five R&B stations, and was at no. 3 on the R&B Singles to Watch list.

As shown by Cash Box in the magazine's 9 October issue, three albums added to the playlist of r&b station WVKO in Columbus were by Skip Mahoney, Newbirth, and Weapons of Peace. The single from the album, "Just Can't Be That Way" had also been added to the playlist of five r&b stations, and it was also no. 10 on the R&B Singles To Watch list.

The 3 December issue of Radio & Records reported that the album had been added to the playlist at KTYD in Santa Barbara.

== Singles ==
The single, "Just Can't Be That Way (Ruth's Song)" (Playboy P6082) peaked at 55 on the Cash Box Top 100 R&B chart. It also peaked at no. 64 on the Billboard Hot Soul Singles chart. The next single, "City" (Playboy P 6093) peaked at no. 78 on the Billboard Hot Soul Singles Chart. It also got to no. 73 on the Record World R&B Singles chart.

== Track listing ==
=== Original 1976 release ===
Side A

1. "Just Can't Be That Way (Ruth's Song)" – 6:05
2. "City" – 4:47
3. "Make Believe You're Near Me" – 5:19

Side B

1. "Space Child" – 3:43
2. "This Life's (About to Get Me Down)" – 3:37
3. "Both Same (As the Other)" – 4:23
4. "Growin' Stronger" – 4:47
5. "Mighty Hard Man" – 4:02

=== 1977 reissue ===
Side A

1. "Roots (Mural Theme / Many Rains Ago (Oluwa))" – 4:06
2. "City" – 4:52
3. "Space Child" – 3:40
4. "Just Can't Be This Way (Ruth's Song)" – 5:55

Side B

1. "Just Keep On Smiling" – 5:10
2. "Growin' Stronger" – 4:30
3. "This Life" – 3:37
4. "Make Believe You're Near Me" – 5:19

== Credits ==
=== Group ===
- Keyboards – Lonnell Dantzler
- Lead vocals, percussion – Finis Henderson III
- Lead guitar, backing vocals, arrangements – Andrew (Randy) Hardy
- Fender bass, Backing vocals, arrangements – David Johnson
- Drums – Bill Leathers

=== Additional ===
- Producer – Mark Davis
- Executive-producer – Hillery Johnson
- Engineer, backing Vocals - Chuck Franklin
- Design – Dave Bhang
- Photography – Antonin Kratochvil
