= City (Weapons of Peace song) =

Song by Weapons of Peace

from the album Weapons of Peace
- A-side: "City"
- B-side: "City"
- Released: 1976
- Label: Playboy P 6093
- Composers: C. Franklin, R. Hardy, F. Henderson, Jr.
- Producers: Mark Davis, Hillery Johnson

Weapons of Peace singles chronology
"Just Can't Be That Way (Ruth's Song)" (1976)	"City" (1976)	"Roots Mural Theme / Many Rains Ago (Oluwa)" (1977)

"City" is a 1976 single for Chicago band Weapons of Peace. It became a chart hit for the group early the following year.

== Background ==
City is a single from the self-titled album by the group Weapons of Peace. Backed with "Both Same (As the Other)", it was released in late 1976 on Playboy P 6093.

"City" was composed by C. Franklin (Charles Franklin), R. Hardy (Andrew Hardy), and F. Henderson Jr. (Finis Henderson, Jr.).

Mark Davis was the producer for the single.

It was reported by Cash Box in the magazine's 27 November issue that Playboy recording act Weapons of Peace would be performing at the McCormick Inn in Chicago for the annual party of black MacDonalds franchise owners. The single by the group called "City" was to be released in two weeks time.

According to the 4 December 1976 issue of Billboard, Weapons of Peace, a new group on the Playboy label had released their debut single from their album which was at the time referred to as Peace is Our Weapon, Love is Our Song.

== Reception ==
The single was in the recommended soul list of Billboard Top Single Picks for the week of 11 December 1976.

The single was reviewed in the 25 December issue of Cash Box where it was one of the Picks of the Week. The reviewer began with "Hard rocking funk pursues the lead vocalist as he complains that the pressures of the city are “getting him down.”" The arrangement being built around the bassline crystal clarity of the bass was mentioned as well. The review was finished off with the reviewer saying that it was a good fusion of rock and heavier funk sounds, and the recommendation that the song was for r&b programming.

== Airplay ==
It was reported in the 10 December issue of the Gavin Report, the single was a regional highlight at WCKO-FM in Fort Lauderdale and KGRI-FM in Henderson. It was also a new add at KSMB in Lafayette, and on the week of 17 December, a regional highlight at KRE in Berkley and KGRI-FM in Henderson.

On the week of 18 December, Cash Box recorded the single's addition to the r&b playlist of WCKO in Fort Lauderdale.

According to the 25 December issue of Billboard, the single was getting play attention at WBLS in New York for the week of 25 December. Also that week, Cash Box recorded the single's addition to the r&b playlists of WBLS (Frankie Crocker's programming), XEAZ in San Diego and WOL in Washington D.C..

== Charts ==
"City" debuted at no. 81 on the Billboard Hot Soul Singles chart for the week of 8 January, 1977. It peaked at no. 78 the following week. Having spent five weeks in the chart, its last entry was no. 94 on 5 February.

City made its debut at no. 73 in the Record World R&B Singles chart the week of 29 January 1977. It held that position for another week.
