= In Your Arms =

In Your Arms may refer to:

== Music ==
Albums

- In Your Arms, 1995 album by Emjay, or its title track

Songs

- "In Your Arms" (Diana Ross song), 1982
- "In Your Arms" (Nico & Vinz song), 2013
- "In Your Arms" (Illenium and X Ambassadors song), 2019
- "In Your Arms (Love song from Neighbours)" a 1989 song by Lynne Hamilton
- "In Your Arms", a song by Chieli Minucci
- "In Your Arms", a song by Destine from Lightspeed
- "In Your Arms", a 2010 song by Kina Grannis
- "In Your Arms", a 2011 song by Irish/British girlband Wonderland from their self-titled debut album Wonderland
- "In Your Arms", a 2013 song by the Backstreet Boys, included on some editions of In a World Like This
- "In Your Arms", a 2015 song by Dutch band Chef'Special
- "In Your Arms", a 2024 song by the Zutons from The Big Decider

== See also ==
- "Here (In Your Arms)", a 2006 song by Hellogoodbye from their Zombies! Aliens! Vampires! Dinosaurs!
- "In Your Arms Tonight", a song by TLC from their 2002 album 3D
