= Weapons of Peace =

1970s American musicians

- Genres: Soul, funk
- Years active: 1970s
- Labels: Playboy Records, FTA
- Past members: Lonnell Dantzler; Andrew Hardy; Finis Henderson; David Johnson; Bill Leathers

Weapons of Peace were a five-man music ensemble active in the 1970s. They had three hits from 1976 to 1977 in the R&B Soul charts.

== Background ==
Weapons of Peace were originally from Chicago. Lead singer and percussionist Finis Henderson III grew up in Chicago. He was the son of the vice-president of Sammy Davis Enterprises. He was a founding member of the group. In addition to Henderson, the group was made up of Andrew Hardy on guitar and backing vocals, David Johnson on bass and backing vocals), Lonnell Dantzler on keyboards, and Bill Leathers on drums.

== Career ==
=== 1976 ===
An article about Playboy Records VP Tom Takayoshi, "Takayoshi Sees Double Sales For Playboy" appeared in the 2 October 1976 issue of Record World. The article stated that Takayoshi had outlined the release of six new albums. Each of them would have their own promotion and merchandising campaign. In addition to releases by Hamilton, Joe Frank & Dennison, Mickey Gilley, Wynn Stewart and Greg Kihn, there would be debut albums by Weapons of Peace and Joey Stec. Also in that issue, the progress of the group's single "Just Can't Be That Way (Ruth's Song)" was shown in the Record World 101 - 150 chart where it had moved up from 135 to 133.

The group released their Weapons of Peace album on Playboy PB 413, which was produced by Mark Davis. It was reviewed in the 9 October 1976 issue of Cash Box. The review was very positive, and the reviewer said that the band was very much in the tradition of Earth, Wind and Fire. With their single, "Just Can't Be That Way" making itself known, the reviewer said that any R&B radio outlet would be foolish to pass up on it and AOR outlets would want a piece of it too.

The group's work with producer Mark Davis and executive producer Hillery Johnson which resulted in the single, "Just Can't Be That Way (Ruth's Song)" bw "Mighty Hard Man" peaked at no. 102 on the Cash Box singles chart. It also peaked at no. 55 on the Cash Box Top 100 R&B chart. It also got to no. 64 on the Billboard chart.

=== 1977 ===
The group's single, "City" made its debut at no. 73 in the Record World R&B Singles chart on the week of 29 January 1977.

The group recorded their single "Roots Mural / Many Rains Ago (Oluwa)" which was released on Playboy P-6101. Record World columnist Dede Dabney had it as a sleeper in one of her three picks of the week in the 19 March issue. She suggested that the song which Quincy Jones had a hand in writing should be listened to and it was destined to cause an explosive reaction. Also in that period, it was reported by Billboard that the group had been signed to Creative Direction in Chicago.

Their album was reissued in 1977 on Playboy PZ 34747. It was reviewed in the 25 June issue of Billboard. The reviewer's picks were "Roots (Mural Theme) / Many Rains Ago (Oluwa)" and "Just Can't Be This Way (Ruth's Song)".

It was reported by Billboard in the magazine's 13 August issue that their management company Creative Direction Inc. had relocated to 233 E. Ontario, Suite 401, Chicago 60611.

== Later years ==
In the 1980s, Lonnell Dantzler was a member of the funk and rap group Wreckin Crew. After Weapons of Peace had broken up, Finis Henderson made his way to Los Angeles. He also became a comedian. He was associated with Richard Pryor and gave material to Pryor. He received an invite from Pryor to tour with him as a support act. Henderson chose to pursue music and formed the soul group Prophesy. In 1983 Finis Henderson released his Finis album.

== Discography ==
Singles
Act	Release	Catalogue	Year	Notes
Weapons of Peace	"Just Can't Be That Way (Ruth's Song)" / " Mighty Hard Man"	Playboy P 6082	1976	
Weapons of Peace	"City" / "Both Same (As the Other)"	Playboy P 6093	1976	
Weapons of Peace	"Roots Mural Theme / Many Rains Ago (Oluwa)" / "This Life's (About to Get Me Down)"	Playboy 6101	1977	
Weapons of Peace	"Just Keep on Smiling" / "Growin' Stronger"	Playboy ZS8 5812	1977	

Albums
Act	Release	Catalogue	Year	Notes
Weapons of Peace	Weapons Of Peace aka Peace is Our Weapon, Love is Our Song	Playboy PB 413	1976	
Weapons of Peace	Weapons Of Peace	Playboy PZ 34747	1977	Reissue. The song "Mighty Hard Man" has been replaced with "Roots (Mural Theme / Many Rains Ago (Oluwa)"
