= Black Flame =

Black Flame or Blackflames, may refer to:

== Music ==
=== Bands ===
- Black Flame (band), Italian black metal band
- The Black Flames, a band who released the 1990 song "Let Me Show You" off their eponymous album The Black Flames

=== Albums ===
- Black Flame (album), 2018 studio album by British metalcore band Bury Tomorrow
- The Black Flame (album), a 2006 album by Swedish heavy metal band Wolf
- The Black Flames (album), 1991 album by The Black Flames containing the song "Let Me Show You" ('The Black Flames' song)

=== Songs ===
- "Black Flame" (song), 2018 song by Bury Tomorrow, the title track off the eponymous album Black Flame (album)

== Literature ==
- The Black Flame (magazine), a bi-annual publication of the Church of Satan
- Black Flame (publisher), publisher of science fiction, fantasy, horror, cult fiction; an imprint of BL Publishing and Games Workshop

=== Books ===
- Blackflame (novel), 2017 novel by Will Wight from the Cradle fantasy series
- Black Flame (book), 2009 book on the global history of anarchism by Lucien van der Walt and Michael Schmidt
- B.P.R.D.: The Black Flame, a 2008 comic book compendium volume of the B.P.R.D. series in the Hell Boy franchise, based on the 2005 comic book miniseries of the same name
- The Black Flame, a 2001 novel by neo-Nazi Harold Covington
- The Black Flame, a 1957 trilogy of historical fiction by W. E. B. Du Bois
- The Black Flame (novel), a 1948 science fiction novel by Stanley G. Weinbaum

== Other uses ==
- Black Flames, a 1993 fantasy role-playing game published by TSR in the Dark Sun setting using the AD&D ruleset

== See also ==
- Flame Black, a color available for the Sony Ericsson W880i
- All pages with titles containing "black" and "flame"
