= Tailgate =

Tailgate, Tailgating, or variants of Tailgator may refer to:

== Automobile ==
- 3-way tailgate, a door or gate at the back of a vehicle
- Tailgating, following another vehicle too closely
- Tailgating, gaining access to restricted areas by following another person, see Piggybacking (security)
- Tailgate party, a social event around the open tailgate of a vehicle

== Entertainment ==
- Tailgate (album), a 2010 album by Trailer Choir
- "Tailgate" (How I Met Your Mother), TV series episode
- Tailgate, cartoon character from The Transformers
- Tail 'Gator, video game
- The Tailgators, a 1980s Cajun band
- Tailgate (song) a 1977 disco song by 12st Creation

== Other uses ==
- Tailgater (Dish Network)
- Tailgating, privately purchasing or selling a security by a broker immediately after trading in the same security for a client, see front running
- Texas Tailgaters, a Banana Ball Championship League team.
