= Patti Hendrix =

- Born: United States
- Genres: R&B, soul
- Instrument: Vocals
- Years active: 1970s
- Labels: 20th Century Fox Records; Hilltak Records

Patti Hendrix is a soul singer who recorded for the 20th Century Fox Records and Hilltak Records labels. She had a hit in 1978 with "Lighting A Fire (That You Can't Put Out)". It made it into the Billboard, Cash Box and Record World charts.

== History and background ==
Patti Hendrix already had a single under her belt. "Men" bw "I'd Believe It" was released on the 20th Century Fox Records label in 1974. She came to Hilltak before mid-year, 1978 when the label was still in its infancy. Label chiefs, Hillery Johnson and Tom Takayoshi felt strongly about her and they signed her up. By June that year they had already acquired masters of her recordings as well as masters of another act, Dalton & Dubarri. With her single to be released soon they already had plans to follow it up with an album. Her single for Hilltak, "Lighting A Fire (That You Can't Put Out)" was composed by Martha Stubbs. The arrangements were done by Brian Gregory & Tom Tom 84.

She has also been referred to as Patti Hendryx.

== Hit single ==
=== Billboard ===
For the week of August 19, her single entered the Billboard Hot Soul Singles chart at #90, just behind another new entry, Alicia Bridges' single "I Love the Nightlife". It peaked at #65 on September 23. It spent a total of ten weeks in the chart.

=== Cash Box ===
With this first release for the Hilltak label, It was in the "Singles To Watch" on the Review page of the July 29 issue of Cashbox. Her vocals on the song which was about an older man's desire for a younger woman were described as gutsy and full of feeling. The backing vocals, tight guitar chorus and guitar work were also noted. For the week ending September 9, 1978, she was getting a fair amount of airplay on Black radio stations with George White's show at WGPR Detroit, Chuck Merrit's show at WRBD - FT. Lauderdale, Jerry Rushian's show at WEDR Miami, Travis Smith's show at WYLD New Orleans and J.J. Jeffries show at KSOL San Francisco. And for the week ending September 16, it was getting played on George White's show at WGPR Detroit and Jerry Rushian's show at WEDR Miami. With her single getting airplay on Chris Turner's show at WGOK at Mobile, Alabama, it entered the Cash Box Top 100 R&B chart at #94 on August 26. It made it to #56 on September 23, and held the position for another week. It spent a total of seven weeks in the chart.

=== Record World ===
Referring to the record as a "down home and funky r&b disc", the reviewer said that her vocal style was a bit reminiscent of Etta James and the record should get immediate r&b airplay. It was also in the "Wax to Watch" list in Dede Dabney's Soul Truth feature. The single entered the Record World RW Black Oriented Singles chart at #66 on September 9. Having spent four weeks in the chart, it peaked at #50 on September 30.

== Discography (selective) ==
Singles
Act	Title	Catalogue	Year	Notes #
Patti Hendrix	"Men" / "I'd Believe It"	20th Century Fox Records TC-2092	1974	
Patti Hendrix	"Lighting A Fire (That You Can't Put Out)" / "We Can't Make It"	Hilltak HT 7801	1978	
