= Open My Eyes =

Open My Eyes may refer to:

- "Open My Eyes", a demo version of "Open Your Eyes" from Calling Time
- "Open My Eyes", a song by Nazz
- "Open My Eyes", a song by Tiffany from The Color of Silence
- "Open My Eyes", a song by Ale Q & Avedon featuring Jonathan Mendelsohn, edit by Tom Swoon
