= Give the Girl a Spanner =

2013 song by Kate Cook

Song by Kate Cook

from the album Come a Long Way (EP)
- Released: 2013
- Genre: Country
- Composer(s): Kate Cook, Allan Caswell

Kate Cook singles chronology
"Survive" (2011)	"Give the Girl a Spanner" (2013)	"Hit The Highway" (2014)

Give the Girl a Spanner was a hit for Australian singer Kate Cook in 2013. It made it into the top 30 in the Australian country charts.

== Background ==
The inspiration for the song came about when Cook had moved to Rockhampton, and was working as a trades assistant on hydraulic machinery for CAT trucks and vehicles It was about women finding strength in jobs that men usually did. She co-wrote the song with Allan Caswell.

== Chart performance ==
The song was picking up pace and by October 2013, receiving a good amount of airplay. The song reached No. 3 in the Australian Tracks Top 30 chart.

== Awards ==
The song won her an Australian Independent Music Award. The single did well at the Music Oz Awards, being named as the 2013 country single of the year.
