= Just Can't Be That Way (Ruth's Song) =

Song by Weapons of Peace

from the album Weapons of Peace
- A-side: "Just Can't Be That Way (Ruth's Song)"
- B-side: "Mighty Hard Man"
- Released: 1976
- Length: 3:16
- Label: Playboy P 6082
- Composer: C. Franklin/Finis Henderson Jr.

Weapons of Peace singles chronology
"Just Can't Be That Way (Ruth's Song)" (1976)	"City" (1976)

"Just Can't Be That Way (Ruth's Song)" was a single for the soul group Weapons of Peace in 1976. It became a hit for them that year.

== Background ==
"Just Can't Be That Way (Ruth's Song)" was written by Charles Frankin and Finis Henderson. Producer Mark Davis, with Executive producer Hillery Johnson produced the Weapons of Peace single, which was backed with "Mighty Hard Man", and released in 1976.

== Reception ==
Along with "Flight of the Moorglade" by Jon Anderson and "Can't You See" by Waylon Jennings, "Just Can't Be That Way (Ruth's Song)" was one of Gary Taylor's personal picks in the 3 September issue of The Gavin Report. Taylor said that it was "certainly different from anything on the market" and that it was " reminiscent of Blue Swede".

In Dede Dabney's "Soul Truth" column in the 11 September 1976 issue of Record World, "Just Can't Be That Way (Ruth's Song)" was noted as up and coming.

The 11 September issue of Cash Box had the single as one of their Picks of the Week. The reviewer said that Weapons of Peace were one of the best groups that they had heard in a long time, and they churn out some exciting funk on this one. The reviewer also said that the truck just wouldn't quit, and the rhythm was infectious.

Vince Aletti of Record World in his Disco File column recommended the song, calling it a funky rock song that builds into something quite interesting.

== Airplay ==
It was reported in The Gavin Report that the single was new regional highlight at KGBC in Galveston. The following week it was added to the playlist at WGCL in Cleveland. The 24 September issue of The Gavin Report showed that the single was one of the thirteen Correspondents' Preferred Picks, and with their name incorrectly spelt as Weapons of Peach, a new regional highlight at WVKO in Columbus.

The single was no. 5 on the Cash Box R&B Singles To Watch list for the week of 25 September.

On the week of 25 September, "Just Can't Be That Way" was added to the playlist of pop station WGCL in Cleveland, It was also added to the playlist of fiver R&B stations; WRBD in Fort Lauderdale, KPKY in Little Rock, XEAZ in San Diego. Their album was also added to the playlist of XEAZ.

By 2 October, it was at no. 3 on the Cash Box R&B Singles To Watch list. It was added to five r&b playlists for the week of 2 October. They were WWIN in Baltimore, WKKO in Columbus, KDAY in Los Angeles and WTMP in Tampa. It was also in the 29 To 24 category on pop station WGCL in Cleveland.

As shown by the 15 October issue of Radio & Records, Weapons of Peace had moved down from no. 20 to no. 21 on the WGCL 98 play chart.

== Charts ==
=== Cash Box ===
For the week of 2 October, the single debuted at no. 117 in the Cash Box Looking Ahead to the Top 100 chart. It peaked at no. 102 on the week of 6 November. That week, the single debuted at no. 91 on the Cash Box Top 100 R&B chart. For the week of 30 October, it peaked at no. 55 on the Cash Box Top 100 R&B chart.

=== Billboard ===
"Just Can't Be That Way (Ruth's Song)" debuted in the Billboard Hot Soul Singles chart the week of 30 October 1976. The following week it reached the peak position of no. 64 and maintained that position for another two weeks.

=== Record World ===
On the week of 25 September, the single debuted in the Record World 101 - 150 Singles chart. On the week of 9 October, it was at no. 123.
