= Footloose (band) =

Canadian band

- Origin: Edmonton, Alberta, Canada
- Years active: 1978–1984
- Labels: Mustard Records, Hilltak Records
- Past members: Tim Feehan; Dwayne Feland; George Goodall; Terry Medd; Curt Smith

Footloose was a Canadian band that had a hit in 1979 with "Leaving For Maui". The membership included Tim Feehan and later, Doug Riley.

== Background ==
Formed in 1978 in Edmonton, Alberta, the group was made up of Tim Feehan on vocals, Dwayne Feland on drums, George Goodall on bass, Terry Medd on guitar and Curt Smith on keys. They all had a leaning towards the funky rhythm and blues sound. Dwayne Feland had played in the HUB Cigar band prior to his being with Footloose, and Tim Feehan and George Goodall had been in the funk-oriented dance band, Buckeye. Terry Medd had been playing in gigs with Curt Smith and he had also been in the band Missouri.

The members of the band never had the intention of being a serious band. They were just trying to make some money. But their song "Leaving For Maui" got into the Canadian Top 10. It took them to Hawaii where they also played.

== Career ==
The single, "Leaving For Maui" bw "Dancing Feelin'" was released in Canada on Mustard M-123 in 1979. It was released in the US on Hilltak PW 7905.

For the week ending September 8, 1979, the record was getting played on Keith James' show at CHED Edmonton, Rosalie Trombley's show at CKLW Windsor, and Don Stevens' show at CKLG Vancouver. By September 24, it was also a chart at CKY Winnipeg.

By December 8, Record World had it as "Single Pick". The reviewer mentioned the smooth pop vocals and classy arrangements and even compared them with an early Hall & Oates. The song eventually made the Canadian Top 10, staying in the charts for six weeks. In Canada's RPM Magazine it reached #74.

"Time Is Right" reached #1 on RPM's Adult Oriented CanCon chart, March 21, 1981.

In 1981, Tim Feehan left the group to become a solo artist. He was replaced by Doug Riley. His solo album Sneak Preview was released on Mustard M 1004. Feehan would also do a duet with Canadian singer, Vicky Moss who he met in Hawaii while with the band.

== Later years ==
The album was re-released by Cool Sound, Inc. on 10 December 2001. It was reissued again by Super Oldies in 2017. Containing work from 1979-1983, it included the album which was taken from the original master tapes. It also included four bonus tracks. Two on the bonus tracks, "Dream Come True" and "Caroline" were previously unreleased, featuring Doug Riley on vocals.

== Discography ==
Singles
Act	Release	Catalogue	Year	Notes
Footloose	"Leaving For Maui" / " Dancin' Feelin'"	Mustard M-123	1979	
Footloose	"Time Is Right" / "It'll Take Some Time"	Mustard M-127	1979	
Tim Feehan and Footloose	"Jamie" / "Thanks I Needed That"	Mustard M-132	1981	
Footloose	"Who's Lovin' Her Now" / "Betty-Lou"	Mustard M-144	1983	

Albums
Act	Release	Catalogue	Year	Notes
Footloose	Footloose	Mustard M-1003	1980	
Footloose	Footloose	World Records WRC4-127 (M-1003-C)	1980	Cassette
Footloose	Footloose	Cool Sound, Inc. COOL-084	2001	CD Japan release
Footloose	Footloose	Super Oldies, USA SOCD20	2017	CD US release
