= This Funk Is Made For Dancing =

Song
- A-side: "This Funk Is Made For Dancing"
- B-side: "Love Bandit"
- Released: 1979
- Label: Hilltak 7505
- Composer(s): Willie Henderson
- Producer(s): Willie Henderson

singles chronology
"Kiss You All Over" (1978)	"This Funk Is Made For Dancing" (1979)	"Magic Man" (1979)

This Funk Is Made For Dancing was the second hit single by disco band Broadway, released on the Hilltak Label. The track was composed, arranged and produced by Willie Henderson. It made both the Billboard and Cash Box charts in 1979.

== Background ==
Broadway's album was in Billboard's "Recommended LPs" section in the magazine's March 17 issue. It got a positive review. The picks were "Magic Man", "This Funk Is Made For Dancing" and "Kiss You All Over". Released on Hilltak 7805, it was a Record World single pick in the B.O.S./Pop section in the March 3 issue with the reviewer calling it energetic and right with the vocals laid over a full track".

== Charts ==
On April 7, the single entered the Cash Box Top 100 chart at #98. It peaked at #91 on the third week (April 21) and stayed at the same spot the following week. It spent a total of six weeks in the chart.

On April 21, "This Funk Is Made for Dancing" peaked at #83. It spent a total of three weeks in the Billboard chart.
