= Kate Cook (singer) =

Australian musical artist (1983–2019)

- Born: Kathryn Dee-Anne Cook; 1983; Pine Mountain, Queensland, Australia
- Died: 3 March 2019 (aged 35–36) Lowood, Queensland, Australia
- Genres: Country
- Occupation: Musician
- Instrument(s): Vocals, guitar
- Years active: 2009–2019
- Website: facebook.com/pg/katecookmusic/

Kathryn Dee-Anne Cook (1983 – 3 March 2019) was an Australian country singer and Australian Idol (2009) finalist. She had solo chart success with "Give the Girl a Spanner" and "Hit the Highway" from her debut extended play, Come a Long Way (July 2013). She died on 3 March 2019, aged 36.

== Biography ==
Kathryn Dee-Anne Cook was born in 1983 in Pine Mountain, Queensland. She grew up with her father, Dave Cook, who was a diesel engineer, her mother, Jenny, and four siblings on a farm in Pine Mountain before moving to Lowood. Jenny Cook committed suicide shortly before her daughter's birthday. Cook resided in Toowoomba and Rockhampton before returning to Lowood.

=== Australian Idol ===
Cook auditioned for Australian Idol on the Mothers Day weekend in 2009 to perform, "Make You Stay", dedicated to her mother, Jenny. By August of that year Cook was in the Top 24. The new-found fame by being on Australian idol put pressure on her domestic relationship, causing it to end. Cook made the final six of Australian Idol in October. She later reflected, "Once you're out of the Australian Idol spotlight, you soon lose the support network of people who helped you during the show... But I'm extremely humbled by what Idol did for me and overwhelmed with how the country music industry has opened its arms to me."

=== Later music career ===
In May 2011 Cook performed her new single, "Survive", at the Lockyer Valley flood appeal. She toured Australia, appearing at various pubs, clubs and bars, showcasing her own style of country music. She played the Tamworth Music festival and the Gympie Muster. Also she supported Troy Cassar-Daley and Beccy Cole. In July 2013, after two years of appearing at various venues, she decided to take a break. She headed to Rockhampton to join her younger sister Sam and work as a trades assistant, working on hydraulic machinery for CAT trucks and vehicles. It was there while working with other women in the job she got the inspiration for a new song. It was "Give the Girl a Spanner". Her debut extended play, Come a Long Way, was released in July 2013. Also that year she was a nominee at the Tamworth Songwriters Competition, and a finalist in the Music Oz Australian Independent Music Awards.

By October 2013, a song from her EP was getting significant airplay in Australia. The song was "Give the Girl a Spanner". It was about women finding strength in jobs that men usually did. The inspiration for the song was drawn from hard working women across the world. It was written by Cook and Allan Caswell. The song peaked at No. 3 in the Australian Tracks Top 30. She won an Australian Independent Music Award for the song. It also did well at the Music Oz Awards as the 2013 country single of the year.

In 2014, Cook had Country Songs Top 40 chart success with another song from the EP. "Hit the Highway" had made its way into the Australian country music chart. In April the song had moved up from No. 23 to No. 20. It peaked at No. 5 in May.

== Death ==
After going missing on 3 March 2019, Cook was found dead in bushland close to her Lowood, Queensland home. The cause of death was not believed to be suspicious. She was 36 years old at the time of her death.

== Discography ==
Come a Long Way (EP)2013
No.	Track	Time	Notes
1	"Give the Girl a Spanner"	3:21	
2	"Hit the Highway"	4:04	
3	"Survive"	4:53	
4	"Come a Long Way"	3:32	
5	"Free"	3:50	
