= Why Not Today =

Song by 9th Creation

from the album Reaching For The Top
- B-side: "Come Back Home"
- Recorded: 1977
- Length: 4:45
- Label: Prelude 71085
- Songwriters: B. Scott, P. Medley

Why Not Today was a hit for R&B, funk band, 9th Creation in 1977. It made it into both the Billboard and Record World charts.

== Background ==
In March 1977, "Why Not Today" by 9th Creation was released on Prelude 71085. Produced by Buddy Scott, the single was 4:45 long. Phil Medley both arranged and conducted the music. It appears on their Reaching for the Top album that was released on Prelude PRL 12146 in October that year. Along with "We're Still Together" by Peaches & Herb and the Phyllis Hyman album by Phyllis Hyman, it was a Record World R&B Pick for March 26. Mentioned in the short review was the explosive rhythm and harmony with a potential to race up the chart.

== Airplay and chart history ==
The June 4th issue of Cash Box showed the single was getting airplay on Don Brooks' show at WWIN in Baltimore and E. Rodney Jones' show at WVON in Chicago, but there was no register in the magazine's Box Top 100 R&B Chart. Eventually the record made it to the Billboard Soul chart. It entered the Hot Soul Singles Chart on June 4 at #98, holding the position for two weeks. It also made the Record World R&B Singles chart, entering at #67 on June 4. By June 18, on its third week, it was at #63.
