= Lighting a Fire (That You Can't Put Out) =

Song produced by Patti Hendrix in 1978

Song by Patti Hendrix
- B-side: "We Can't Make it"
- Released: 1978
- Length: 3:17
- Label: Hilltak Records HT 7801
- Songwriter(s): Martha K. Stubbs
- Producer(s): Patti Hendrix & E. Gardner; Arranged by Brian Gregory and Tom Tom 84

Patti Hendrix singles chronology
"Men" (1974)	"Lighting a Fire (That You Can't Put Out)" (1978)

Lighting a Fire (That You Can't Put Out) was a hit for Hilltak Records recording artist Patti Hendrix in 1978. It made the Billboard, Cash Box and Record World charts.

== Background ==
In June 1978, Hilltak Records had acquired the masters of Patti Hendrix's recordings and were to release the recording and follow up with an album. Released on Hilltak Records HT 7801, the song was written by Martha Stubbs, and arranged by Brian Gregory and Tom Tom 84. The song is about an older man's desire for younger women.

Cash Box had it in their "Singles To Watch" section on the Review page of the July 29 issue. Dede Dabney of Record World had it in the "Wax to Watch" list of her Soul Truth feature on August 5. The review from Record World was positive, calling it a "down home and funky r&b disc", with the reviewer noting that her vocal style was a bit reminiscent of Etta James. The prediction was that the record should get immediate r&b airplay.

On the week of August 19, the single entered the Billboard Hot Soul Singles chart at #90, just behind another new entry, Alicia Bridges' single "I Love the Nightlife". It entered the Cash Box Top 100 R&B chart at #94 on August 26. And it entered the Record World RW Black Oriented Singles chart at #66 on September 9.

It was also the first single that the Hilltak label had released.

=== Cash Box airplay ===
August 26 to September 16

The single was getting airplay on Chris Turner's show at WGOK at Mobile, Alabama for the week ending August 26. For the week ending September 9, 1978 she was getting a fair amount of airplay on Black radio stations with George White's show at WGPR Detroit, Chuck Merrit's show at WRBD - FT. Lauderdale, Jerry Rushian's show at WEDR Miami, Travis Smith's show at WYLD New Orleans and J.J. Jeffries show at KSOL San Francisco. And for the week ending September 16, it was getting played on George White's show at WGPR Detroit and Jerry Rushian's show at WEDR Miami.

== Charts ==
Chart (1979)	Peak position
US Hot Soul Singles (Billboard)	65
US Top 100 R&B (Cash Box}	56
US RW Black Oriented Singles (Record World)	50
