= Hit the Highway (song) =

2014 song by Kate Cook

Song by Kate Cook

from the album Come a Long Way (EP)
- Released: 2014
- Genre: Country
- Composer(s): Kate Cook

Kate Cook singles chronology
"Give the Girl a Spanner"	"Hit the Highway"

Hit the Highway was the third single for Australian country singer Kate Cook in 2014 who had a hit the previous year with "Give the Girl a Spanner.

== Background ==
Cook had success the previous year with Give the Girl a Spanner. It made it into the Australian Tracks Top 30 and peaked at #3.

Cook went missing on March 3, 2019. She was found dead in bushland not far from her home in Lowood. Her death was not believed to be suspicious.

== Chart performance ==
This song was from Cook's Hit the Highway EP. It peaked at No. 5 in May, during a 14-week chart run.
