= Leaving for Maui =

Single by Footloose
- B-side: "Dancin' Feelin'"
- Released: 1979
- Length: 3:24
- Label: Mustard
- Composer: Buck - Feehan
- Producers: Garry McDonall and Tim Feehan

Footloose singles chronology
"Leaving for Maui" (1979)	"Time Is Right" (1979)

Leaving for Maui was a hit in Canada and Hawaii for Edmonton cabaret band Footloose in 1979.

== Background ==
Footloose were a college band that had been around for around 18 months. This was their first release. Six months after it was released it got to the top ten in Canada. In addition to making the top of the Canadian music charts, it was also one of the most requested songs of the year in Hawaii. The light disco rock single brought the group big success.

It was a Record World Single Pick for the week ending December 8, 1979. The reviewer noted the smooth pop vocals and classy arrangements and drew a comparison with an early Hall & Oates.

=== Airplay ===
For the week ending September 8, 1979, the record was getting played on Keith James' show at CHED Edmonton, Rosalie Trombley's show at CKLW Windsor, and Don Stevens' show at CKLG Vancouver. It was also a chart at CKY Winnipeg.

== Chart ==
The song made the Canadian Top 10, and stayed in the charts for six weeks. In Canada's RPM Magazine it reached #74 on the pop charts and #29 on the AC charts.

Along with the group's other single, "The Time Is Right", "Leaving for Maui" charted again in 1981 on Toronto station, CFTR.

== Releases ==
Singles
Act	Title	Catalogue	Year	Notes #
Footloose	"Leaving For Maui" / "Dancing Feelin'"	Mustard M-123	1979	Canada release
Footloose	"Leaving For Maui" / "Dancing Feelin'"	Hilltak PW 7905	1979	United States release
