= Joey Moss =

Canadian dressing room attendant (1963–2020)

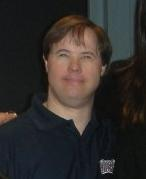
- Moss in 2008
- Born: Joseph Neil Moss; September 25, 1963; Edmonton, Alberta, Canada
- Died: October 26, 2020 (aged 57); Edmonton, Alberta, Canada
- Years active: 1985–2020
- Known for: Dressing room attendant for the Edmonton Oilers and the Edmonton Eskimos

Joseph Neil Moss (September 25, 1963 – October 26, 2020) was a Canadian dressing room attendant for the Edmonton Oilers of the National Hockey League and the Edmonton Eskimos of the Canadian Football League. Born with Down syndrome, he struck up a friendship with Wayne Gretzky in the mid-1980s, when the latter was playing for the Oilers and dating Moss's sister. Gretzky advised the team to give Moss a tryout as locker room attendant. He ultimately held that position for over three decades, until his death in 2020.

== Early life ==
Moss was born in Edmonton, Alberta, on September 25, 1963. He was the twelfth of thirteen children of Lloyd Orval Moss and Sophie Frances Moss (née Murias). He was born with Down syndrome and grew up in a humble household. In spite of his condition, Moss's parents ensured that he received the same treatment as his other siblings. He played a small guitar in the family band (called "The Alaska Highway Birth-Quakes").

After Moss's father died in 1977, his mother proceeded to raise the children as a single parent. Moss was employed at a bottle depot when he first met Wayne Gretzky at the age of 17.

== Career ==
Moss caught the eye of Oilers centre Wayne Gretzky in 1980. Gretzky was dating Moss's sister Vikki at the time. Impressed with the dedication Moss brought to his job at the bottle depot, Gretzky suggested to team general manager Glen Sather that the young man be given a tryout. As the summer of 1986 came around, Gretzky was worried that Moss would lose everything he had learned with the Oilers, so Gretzky called up the equipment manager of the Edmonton Eskimos, Dwayne Mandrusiak, and asked him if Moss could work with them during training camp in the summer months.

Moss' career with the Oilers ultimately long outlasted Gretzky's. His determination and passion for hockey made him a nationwide celebrity and a major symbol of continuity within the franchise. During an Oilers surprising playoff run in 2006, Moss delayed elective surgery for a hernia in order to see the Stanley Cup playoffs through to the finish. His main duties with the team included cleaning, handling towels and water, and running errands for former equipment manager Lyle "Sparky" Kulchisky.

== Awards and recognition ==
Moss received the NHL Alumni Association's "Seventh Man Award" in 2003, in recognition of outstanding behind-the-scenes service to the league. The Joey Moss Cup, a trophy contended for by Oilers players in an annual split-squad game near the end of training camp, is named after him.

Moss' dedication to the Edmonton Eskimos and the Oilers was recognized when a mural was unveiled on October 20, 2008, on 99 Street in Edmonton. He was conferred the Queen Elizabeth II Diamond Jubilee Medal on November 14, 2012. Moss was inducted into the Alberta Sports Hall of Fame three years later on May 29, 2015.

== Later life and death ==
Moss's younger brother, Stephen, served as his legal guardian until the latter's death in June 2019 from glioblastoma.

Moss died on October 26, 2020, at a hospital in Edmonton. He was 57, and had been living with Alzheimer's disease in the time leading up to his death. He also had surgery to repair a broken hip he sustained earlier in July of that same year.

== Legacy ==
On January 13, 2021, the Edmonton Oilers opened the 2020–21 season with a video tribute and by wearing Moss's name on the back of their jerseys during the warmup. In advance of the 2021–22 season, the Oilers announced that they would play Ritchie Valens' "La Bamba", Moss's favourite song, after every home team victory at Rogers Place.

In June 2021, Edmonton Public Schools announced that it would be naming a new school in the Keswick neighbourhood of southwest Edmonton after Moss. The Joey Moss School opened in September 2022 for students in Kindergarten to Grade 7, with Grades 8 and 9 to be added as students advance in the next two years.

In September 2021, a permanent bronze sculpture created by Canadian sculptor Ryan Kurylo honoring Joey Moss was unveiled at Rogers Place in Edmonton. Placed near the entrance of the dressing room, the artwork celebrates Moss' legacy as the longtime locker room attendant for the Edmonton Oilers.

== See also ==
- List of people with Down syndrome
