= Finis Henderson III =

- Born: Chicago, United States
- Genres: Soul, r&b, rock, pop
- Occupations: Musician, comedian
- Instruments: Voice, percussion
- Label: Motown
- Formerly of: Chicago Community Music Foundation, Weapons of Peace, Prophecy

Finis Henderson III is an American singer and comedian who had a hit with "Skip to My Lou" in 1983 which remained in the charts for over three months. He was also the lead singer of the group Weapons of Peace and performed on their hits "Just Can't Be That Way (Ruth's Song)" and "City".

== Background ==
Finis Henderson was a member of the Chicago Community Music Foundation. Members of that ensemble, including Henderson, formed the group Weapons of Peace, in the early 1970s. In 1983, he was exclusively signed to Motown Records. His album that he recorded for the label was produced by Al McKay.

His father Finis Henderson Jr. was a promotor manager for Sammy Davis Jr., Redd Foxx, Brook Benton, Jerry Butler and the Dells. His uncle is Bill Henderson a recording artist and actor.

As a comedian, Henderson was associated with Richard Pryor and gave material to him to use. He received an invite from Pryor to tour with him as a support act. He made multiple appearances at the Comedy Connection in Boston in the early 1990s.

== Career ==
=== 1970s ===
==== Weapons of Peace ====
Finis Henderson, Jr. and Charles Frankin wrote the song "Just Can't Be That Way (Ruth's Song)" which was released in 1976. With Finis Henderson III on lead vocals, the song was recorded by his band Weapons of Peace and produced by Mark Davis, with Executive producer Hillery Johnson. It peaked at no. 64 on the Billboard Hot Soul Singles chart and stayed in the chart for a month.

Charles Franklin and Randy Hardy, and Finis Henderson, Jr. wrote "City" which was also recorded by Weapons of Peace. It was also a hit and made it to no. 78 in the US on the Billboard Hot Soul Singles chart.

=== 1980s ===
Henderson sang on the Bill Wolfer single "Call Me" which was released in 1982. It was reviewed in the 20 November issue of Cash Box. With the r&b / jazz edge noted, the similarity between Henderson's vocals and Michael McDonald's were also noted. The comparison was also mentioned when Wolfer's album was reviewed by Paul Sexton of Record Mirror the following year.

==== "Skip to My Lou" (single) ====
Henderson's single "Skip to My Lou" was released on Motown 1669 MF. It was reviewed in the 7 May 1983 issue of Cash Box. With the single reviewed positively, the reviewer made references to a Romeo waking up a sleeping beauty and the record having a playful funk groove.

On 27 August, and in its eleventh charting week, the single peaked at no. 33 on the Cash Box Top 100 Black Contemporary singles chart.

The single peaked at no. 48 on the week of 23 July and spent a total of thirteen weeks in the Billboard chart.

It was making the charts in the UK and on the week of 30 July, the single had moved up from no. 25 to no. 22 on the Record Mirror Disco chart.

==== Fins (album) ====
Henderson recorded his album Finis which was produced by Al McKay and released on Motown L6036ML. It was reviewed in the 16 July 1983 issue of Cash Box. The reviewer noted the MOR and adult contemporary potential. On 30 July, with his hit "Skip to My Lou" at no. 47 and at its seventh week in the Cash Box Top 100 Black Contemporary Singles chart and moving upwards, his album debuted at no. 62 in the Cash Box Black Contemporary Top 75 Albums chart. At week six, on 3 September, the album peaked at no. 33 on the Cash Box Black Contemporary Top 75 Albums chart.

=== Further activities ===
It was reported by Jet in the magazine's 7 February 1983 issue that Henderson was off to Chile to pick up first prize for his song "The Message" that was co-written with Al McKay. The song was a winner at the Chile Music Festival.

== Later years ==
In later years Finis Henderson has worked as a music impressionist covering Sammy Davis, Michael Jackson, Willie Nelson, Julio Iglesias. He also has opened for Smokey Robinson.

Henderson was booked to appear at The Ice House in Pasadena from 7 to 10 January 1994. In an article in the Sierra Madre News, it was noted that Henderson was once in an improv group with Andrew Dice Clay. It was pointed out that if the name of Clay was setting off alarms, there was nothing to worry about as Henderson's act was clean and didn't contain profanity.

== Discography ==
Singles
Act	Release	Catalogue	Year	Notes
Bill Wolfer featured vocal performance by Finis Henderson	"Call Me" / "Window on a Dream"	Constellation 7-69891	1982	Henderson side 1 only
Finis Henderson	"Skip to My Lou"	Motown 1669 MF	1983	
Finis Henderson	"Lovers" / "School Girl"	Motown 1696 MF	1983	

Album
Act	Release	Catalogue	Year	Notes
Finis Henderson	Finis	Motown	1983	
Finis Henderson	Finis	Universal Japan	2019	CD
