= Essar (album) =

Studio album by Smokey Robinson
- Released: 1984
- Recorded: 1984
- Studios: Golden Sound Studios (Hollywood, California); Mama Jo's Studios (North Hollywood, California)
- Genres: R&B, soul
- Length: 41:44
- Label: Motown
- Producers: Smokey Robinson; Reginald "Sonny" Burke; Scott V. Smith; Stephen Tavani; Mark Davis; Steve Dorff; Randy Dunlap

Smokey Robinson chronology
| Touch the Sky (1983) | Essar (1984) | Smoke Signals (1986) |

Professional ratings
Review scores
| Source | Rating |
|---|---|
| Allmusic | link |

Essar is the twelfth studio album by American singer-songwriter Smokey Robinson, released in 1984. It was produced and arranged by Robinson with Reginald "Sonny" Burke. The album was released on the Motown sub-label Tamla. The album's title is a pun on the initials of Robinson's name (S.R.).

== Reception ==
The album only peaked at #141 on Billboard pop charts, and at #35 on R&B charts. "And I Don't Love You" peaked at #106 Billboard and #33 R&B charts, and "I Can't Find" at #109 Billboard and #41 R&B charts.

Although the 12" B-side of "And I Don't Love You" Larry Levan's Instrumental (Dub) became a House Music classic in the late 2000s.

William Ruhlmann gave 2 out of 5 stars on AllMusic, addressing it as "the low point" in Robinson's career and holding Sonny Burke's dominating synthesiser responsible. Where Robert Christgau rated it as B+, acknowledging that there are "fillers", but concluding with "one thing you can say about Smokey's filler that you can't say about anybody else's--Smokey's singing it".

== Track listing ==
All tracks composed by William "Smokey" Robinson; except where indicated

=== Side A ===
1. "And I Don't Love You" – 5:20
2. "Train of Thought" – 4:55
3. "I Can't Find" – 6:15
4. "Why Are You Running From My Love" (Scott V. Smith, Stephen Tavani) – 4:20

=== Side B ===
1. "Gone Forever (Theme from the motion picture Cry of the City" (Mark Kevin Davis) – 3:10
2. "Close Encounters of the First Kind" – 4:35
3. "Little Girl Little Girl" – 5:12
4. "Girl I'm Standing There" – 4:25
5. "Driving Thru Life in the Fast Lane" (Milton Brown, Snuff Garrett, Steve Dorff) – 3:32

== Personnel ==
- Smokey Robinson – lead vocals, backing vocals (1–3, 6–9)
- Reginald "Sonny" Burke – keyboards (1–3, 6–8), drums (1–3, 6–8), arrangements (1–3, 6–8)
- Clark Spangler – Yamaha DX7 programming (1)
- Michael Ruff – keyboards (4)
- Rhett Lawrence – synthesizer programming (4)
- Mark Davis – keyboards (5), synthesizers (5)
- John Hobbs – keyboards (9)
- Charles Fearing – guitars (1–3, 6)
- David T. Walker – guitars (2, 3, 7)
- James Harrah – guitars (4)
- Wah Wah Watson – guitars (6)
- Dann Huff – guitars (9)
- Paul Jackson Jr. – guitars (9)
- Lequeint "Duke" Jobe – bass (5)
- Freddie Washington – bass (8)
- Joe Chemay – bass (9)
- Lynn Coulter – LinnDrum programming (4)
- Scott V. Smith – LinnDrum programming (4)
- John Robinson – drums (9)
- Paulinho da Costa – percussion (9)
- Michael Jacobsen – cello (3, 8)
- Harry Bluestone – concertmaster (3, 8)
- Bill Green – oboe (5)
- Dick Hyde – trombone (9)
- Dick Noel – trombone (9)
- Gary Grant – trumpet (9)
- Warren Luening – trumpet (9)
- Jerry Hey – lead trumpet (9)
- Larry Herbstritt – horn arrangements (9)
- Steve Dorff – rhythm arrangements (9)
- Ivory Davis – backing vocals (1–4, 6–8)
- Patricia Henley Talbert – backing vocals (1–3, 6–8)
- Howard McCrary – backing vocals (4)
- Howard Smith – backing vocals (4)
- Carmen Grillio – backing vocals (5)
- Allan Rich – backing vocals (5)
- Mindy Sterling – backing vocals (5)
- Julia Tillman Waters – backing vocals (9)
- Maxine Willard Waters – backing vocals (9)
- Oren Waters – backing vocals (9)

=== Production ===
- William "Smokey" Robinson Jr. – producer (1–3, 5–8), mix assistant, cover concept
- Reginald "Sonny" Burke – producer (1–3, 6–8), mix assistant
- Scott V. Smith – producer (4)
- Stephen Tavani – producer (4)
- Mark Davis – producer (5)
- Charlee King – associate producer (5)
- Steve Dorff – producer (9)
- Randy Dunlap – producer (9)
- Mitchel Delevie – recording (1–3, 6, 7), vocal engineer (5), rhythm engineer (8)
- Chris Banninger – engineer (4)
- Win Kutz – engineer (4)
- Frank Wolf – engineer (4)
- Karen Siegel – rhythm engineer (5)
- Paul Ring – rhythm engineer (8)
- Ed Barton – engineer (9)
- Marv Clamme – engineer (9)
- Gary Singleman – engineer (9)
- Jeff DeMorris – second engineer (1–3, 6, 7)
- Fred Law – second engineer (1–3, 6, 7)
- Steve Ford – second engineer (4)
- Todd Van Etten – second engineer (4)
- Michael Dotson – assistant engineer (5)
- Barney Perkins – mixing and editing at Kendun Recorders (Burbank, California)
- Bob Robitaille – editing assistant (1)
- Phillip Walters – editing assistant (2–9)
- Bernie Grundman – mastering at Bernie Grundman Mastering (Hollywood, California)
- Dave Pell – session coordinator (9)
- George Annis – music contractor
- Andres Victorin – music copyist
- Aaron Rapoport – photography
- Johnny Lee – art direction

== Essar to Emgee ==
The cover backside contains a handwritten message: "A note to Emgee: We're really gonna miss you, Essar" – obviously from Smokey Robinson (S.R.) to his colleague Marvin Gaye (M.G.) who was murdered on April 1, 1984.
