= Skip to My Lou (Finis Henderson song) =

Song by Finis Henderson III

from the album Finis
- A-side: "Skip to My Lou"
- B-side: "I'd Rather Be Gone"
- Released: 1983
- Length: 5:01 (Album/12" version): 3:59 (Single mix)
- Label: Motown 1669 MF
- Composer(s): F. Hamilton
- Producer(s): Al McKay

Finis Henderson III singles chronology
"Skip to My Lou" (1983)	"Lovers" (1983)

"Skip to My Lou" was a 1983 single for singer Finis Henderson III. It was released on the Motown label and became a hit for him that year.

== Background ==
"Skip To My Lou" was written by Frank Hamilton. The song was produced by Al McKay. It appears on Henderson's Finis album that was released in 1983. The album version of the song runs for five minutes and one second.

It was reported in the 27 August 1983 issue of Billboard that Henderson was working on a video for "Skip to My Lou". It was being produced by Joe Orlandino of Bop Theater in Chicago. The director was Tony Aguilera.

== Reception ==
The single was reviewed in the 7 May 1983 issue of Cash Box. It received a positive review with the reviewer making references to a Romeo waking up a sleeping beauty. The record was described as having a playful funk groove.

== Airplay ==
=== US ===
As noted by R&R in the 6 May issue, Henderson's single was one of the additions to the playlist in KIKI in Honolulu. On the week of 20 May, it was noted by R&R that the single was added to the playlist of WILD in Boston, WGCI in Chicago and WGPR in Detroit, and KJCB in Lafayette, and KDAY in Los Angeles.

Along with "Hopscotch" by Gwen Guthrie, "Bad Lady" by Stone City Band and "It's You I Love" by Pamela Nivens, Skip to My Lou was one of the mentioned black contemporary Up and Coming singles in the 11 June issue of Cash Box.

It was noted in the 16 July issue of Cash Box that the single was one of the highlights at radio KJFJ in Los Angeles.

=== UK ===
The single was recorded as a breaker (Appearing on an airplay action page for the first time) by Music & Video Week in the 23 July issue. The following week, Music & Video Week had it as one of the bubblers.

== Charts ==
=== US ===
For the week of 18 June 1983, the single debuted at no. 86 on the Cash Box Top 100 Black Contemporary singles chart. On 27 August, and in its eleventh charting week, the single peaked at no. 33 on the Cash Box Top 100 Black Contemporary Singles chart.

The single peaked at no. 48 on the week of 23 July and spent a total of thirteen weeks in the Billboard chart.

=== UK ===
It charted in the UK, and for the week of 16 July, it moved up twenty notches from no. 50 to no 30 on the Record Mirror Disco chart. That week the single also debuted at no. 99 on the Record Mirror Top Singles chart. For the week of 23 July, the single had moved up from no. 99 to no. 77 in the Music & Video Week The Next 75 chart.

For the week of 30 July, the single had moved up from no. 25 to its peak position of no. 22 on the Record Mirror Disco chart.
