= Broadway (disco band) =

- Origin: United States
- Genres: R&B, disco
- Years active: Mid to late 1970s
- Labels: Prelude Records; Hilltak Records
- Past members: Patti Williams

Broadway was an American disco band that had three chart hits. Produced by Willie Henderson they had a national hit in 1978 with their version of the "Exile hit, "Kiss You All Over". They had another chart hit with "This Funk Is Made For Dancing"

== Background ==
Broadway was a group that had four female singers. The lead singer was Patti Williams. It was put together by Willie Henderson who had penned hits for Jackie Wilson, Tyrone Davis, Gene Chandler and Patti Labelle etc.

Williams had recorded previously. In 1971, she had had a single, "Satan's Daughter" released on the Rocky Ridge label. It was a chart prediction. She also performed a song at Reve Gibson's 18th annual Youth On Parade program that was held in L.A. in July, 1978. Her performance of the show's theme, "If I Can Help Somebody" was the event's highlight.

They were possibly connected with an earlier group of the same name who had a hit with "You To Me Are Everything".

== Career ==
=== 1978 ===
As of September 1978, along with 9th Creation, Dalton & Dubarri, The Guess Who, and Lynne Hamilton, they were the first artists to come to new Hilltak label that had formed in June that year. Their version of "Kiss You All Over" bw "Love Bandit" was released on Hilltak 7802 in 1978. Record World called it "The inevitable disco version". On the week ending December 2, 1978, their single debuted at #98 in the Billboard Hot Soul Singles chart. The following week it was at #96. Spending three weeks in the chart, it peaked at #92 on December 16.

=== 1979 ===
According to the March 10, 1979, issue of Billboard, Broadway's album was due in late February. Patti Williams with her backing band Capt. Funk was to have an album of her own released. The album was in Billboard's Recommended LPs section in the magazine's March 17 issue. It got a positive review. The picks were "Magic Man", "This Funk Is Made For Dancing" and "Kiss You All Over". Williams' singing the ballad "Take Me In Your Arms" was also noted. Her vocals were also noted by Record World in their issue on the same date, referring to it as an "instantly appealing disco record".

In April their hit "This Funk Is Made for Dancing" peaked at #83.

== Discography (selective) ==
Singles
Act	Title	Catalogue	Year	Notes #
Broadway	"Kiss You All Over" / "Love Bandit"	Hilltak HT 7802	1978	
Broadway	"This Funk Is Made For Dancing" / "Love Bandit"	Hilltak HT 7805	1979	
Broadway	"Magic Man" / "Kiss You All Over"	Hilltak HT	1979	

Album
Act	Title	Catalogue	Year	Notes #
Broadway	Magic Man	Hilltak HT 19225	1979	
