= Finis (album) =

Studio album by Finis Henderson III
- Released: 1983
- Genre: Soul, dance
- Label: Motown 6036ML
- Producer: Al McKay

Finis was a 1983 album by Finis Henderson III that was released on the Motown label. It features his biggest hit "Skip to My Lou”.

== Background ==
The album was produced by Al McKay and contains ten tracks.

The album in LP format was issued on Motown 6036ML. The cassette version was issued on Motown CA 6036 MC.

== Reception ==
In June 1983, James Hamilton, while mentioning the BPM on a single "Call Me" by Bill Wolfer that featured Finis Henderson, also mentioned Henderson's album's BPMs on tracks "Percussion Intro", "Lovers", "I’d Rather Be Gone" and "School Girl". Hamilton referred to it as a pleasant soulful debut album.

The Al McKay production was released on Motown L6036ML. It was reviewed in the 16 July 1983 issue of Cash Box. The reviewer noted the MOR and adult contemporary potential.

== Charts ==
The album debuted at no. 62 in the Cash Box Black Contemporary Top 75 Albums chart for the week of 30 July 1983. At that time, "Skip to My Lou" was at no. 47 and at its seventh week, moving upwards in the Cash Box Top 100 Black Contemporary Singles chart. At week six, on 3 September, the album peaked at no. 33 on the Cash Box Black Contemporary Top 75 Albums chart.

It also made the Billboard Black LPs chart. For the week of 18 August at week six, it reached its peak of no. 42.

== Track listing ==
Finis, Motown 6036ML
No.	Track	Composer	Time	Notes
A1	"Skip to My Lou"	Frank Hamilton	5:01	
A2	"Making Love"	Al McKay, Linda Starr	3:46	
A3	"Lovers"	Finis Henderson, David Paul Bryant, Gregory Doty, Tony Haynes	4:46	
A4	"You Owe It All to Love"	Al Mckay, David Paul Bryant, Tony Haynes	3:29	
A5	"Blame It on the Night"	Sandy Torano, Rob Preston	3:41	
B1.1	"Percussion Intro"	Finis Henderson, Bill Wolfer	2:04	
B1.2	"Call Me"	Finis Henderson, Bill Wolfer	4:21	
B2	"Vina del Mar"	Al McKay, Erich Bulling	0:48	
B3	"Crush On You"	Stevie Wonder	4:03	
B4	"I’d Rather Be Gone"	Dennis Lambert, JC Crowley	3:40	
B5	"School Girl"	Al McKay, Frank Hamilton, Adonis Hampton, Gregory Doty	5:20	

== Personnel ==
- Philip Bailey – percussion
- Michael Boddicker – keyboards, synthesizer, Moog bass
- George Bohanon – baritone saxophone
- Walter Borchers – engineer
- Erich Bulling – keyboards, rhythm arrangements, horn arrangements
- Bill Champlin – background vocals
- Tony D'Amico – additional engineering
- Paulinho da Costa – percussion
- Gregory Doty – guitar
- Nathan East – bass guitar
- Charles Findley – trombone
- Humberto Gatica – engineer
- Garry Glenn – background vocals
- Steven George – background vocals
- Gary Grant – Flugelhorn
- Frank "Rusty" Hamilton – keyboards, Moog bass, vocal assistance ("Skip to My Lou"), rhythm arrangements ("Skip to My Lou" and "School Girl")
- Adonis Hampton – vocal assistance ("School Girl"), background vocals
- Finis Henderson – vocals, rhythm arrangement ("School Girl")
- Jerry Hey – Flugelhorn
- Paul M. Jackson, Jr. – guitar
- Ralph Johnson – percussion
- Tom Keene – keyboards, Jupiter 8
- Randy Kerber – keyboards, Jupiter 8
- Abraham Laboriel – bass guitar
- Michael Landau – guitar
- Johnny Lee – art direction
- Steve Lukather – guitar
- George Massenburg – mixing
- Al McKay – producer, guitar, rhythm arrangements
- Barbra Nagel – production coordinator
- Richard Page – background vocals
- Arleen Parks – background vocals
- Jeff Porcaro – drums
- Steve Porcaro – synthesizer programming ("Lovers")
- Bill Reichenbach – trombone
- John Robinson – drums
- Ron Slenzak – photography
- Neil Stubenhaus – bass guitar
- Steve Tavaglione – saxophone solo ("Making Love")
- Carmen Twillie – background vocals
- Carlos Vega – drums
- Sandra Wilson – additional engineering
