= Hilltak Records =

- Parent company: Atlantic
- Founded: June 16, 1978
- Founder: Tom Takayoshi and Hillery Johnson
- Genre: R&B, disco
- Country of origin: United States
- Location: California

Hilltak records was a Californian Independent record label that was formed in the late 1970s. Artists that produced hits for the label include 9th Creation, Patti Hendrix, Broadway, Dalton & Dubarri, and The Guess Who. The label started out as a subsidiary of Atlantic Records but terminated the relationship some time later.

== Background ==
In 1978, Tom Takayoshi and Hillery Johnson co-founded Hilltak Records. The name Hilltak was a combination of their names. They had previously worked together for years. As of the time they were interviewed (published June 10, 1979), Johnson was still the vice president of special markets for the Atlantic label and would still liaise between Atlantic and the emerging Los Angeles label as well as handling the promotion and publicity. Takayoshi had left his position with Playboy Records and had taken up office in Los Angeles.

The label was registered June 16, 1978, in California. The Hilltak label was a subsidiary of Atlantic Records. Their formation was first announced at a Black Radio convention prior to June 17th. It was also confirmed by Ahmet Ertegun, the chairman of Atlantic Records and Atlantic president Jerry Greenberg. The label's catalogue had a leaning towards the disco and R&B genres. The idea they started with was to keep the roster low to allow them to give their personal attention to the artists. The artists they started off with were Patti Hendrix, Dalton & Dubarri and Broadway, a disco outfit put together by Willie Henderson.

Some of the other artists that had their work released on the label were Lynne Hamilton, The Guess Who, Footloose and The 9th Creation.

== History ==
=== 1978 ===
The focus of the Los Angeles label was to be r&b. It was announced in the June 10 issue of Billboard that the first artist that was to have a record released on the label was Patti Hendrix. At that time they had already acquired the recorded masters of Hendrix and Dalton & Dubarri. Hendrix went on to have success with her single "Lighting a Fire (That You Can't Put Out)" in 1978 which peaked at #65 on September 23 on the Billboard Hot Soul Singles chart. It also spent a total of ten weeks in the chart. Broadway would have chart success with the first of two singles for the label, "Kiss You All Over" which got to #92 on the r&b chart in December, 1978. Also that month, "C'mon Little Mama" (Hilltak 7803) by The Guess Who was a sleeper in the Record World, December 2 issue Hits of the Week.

=== 1979 ===
By 1979, the label had done well with albums, Magic Man by Broadway and Choice by Dalton & Dubarri.

On March 31, The Guess Who's album, All This For a Song, Hilltak HT 19227 was listed in the Record World Hits of the Week section with the magazine calling it one of the best LPs by the group in years.

In April 1979, Broadway brought in another chart hit for the label with the Willie Henderson composition, "This Funk Is Made for Dancing". In May, the Dalton & Durbarri single, "I (You) Can Dance All By My (Your) Self" bw "Keepin' It Up" was released on Hilltak HT 7806. On June 23, at its fourth week in the Cash Box chart, it peaked at No. 73. and got to #123 on the Record World Singles 101 to 150 Chart. From May 31 to June 14, it held its peak position at number 138 on the Radio Report MS Survey chart. It also made #79 on the Billboard Hot Soul Singles chart on June 30.

In September 1979 the label had shifted from Atlantic Records to use a network of nine independent distributors which included California Records in L.A. and Big State in Dallas. Also around that period, "On the Inside" ( theme to the TV series, Prisoner) by Lynne Hamilton was released on Hilltak. DJM Records had also recently signed Hilltak to a three year agreement for the UK and Ireland.

The song, "Leaving for Maui" by Footloose which made the Canadian Top Ten was issued in the United States on Hilltak PW 7905.

9th Creation had their single, "Let's Dance" bw "Shucks, You're Fine" was released on Hilltak PW 7901. The record peaked spent a total of ten weeks in the Billboard Hot Soul Singles chart, peaking at #45 on December 15, 1979. It also spent eleven weeks in the Cash Box Top 100 chart, peaking at #53 on December 12.

=== 1980 ===
In January, 1980, "Let's Dance" was still in the Record World chart. It peaked at #47 on January 19, 1980, having spent a total of seven weeks in the Record World Black Oriented Singles chart.

== Distributors ==
Singles
Name	Area	Notes
Atlantic Records		(Relationship terminated in 1979)
All South	New Orleans	
Bib	Charlotte	
Big State	Dallas, Houston	
California Records	Los Angeles	
Chips	Philadelphia	
Malverne	New York, Boston	
Pacific Records and Tapes	San Francisco, Seattle	
Progress Records	Cleveland, Chicago, Detroit, Buffalo	
Tone Distributors	Miami	
Zamioski	Baltimore and Washington, D.C.	

== Post Hilltak ==
By 1980, Takayoshi was working as general manager for Sound Music Sales in Los Angeles.
