= Willie Henderson (musician) =

American R&B and soul musician (born 1941)

- Genres: R&B, soul music, funk
- Occupations: Record producer, musician
- Instrument: Saxophone

Willie Henderson (born August 9, 1941, in Pensacola, Florida) is an American R&B and soul musician and producer.

== Background ==
Henderson moved to Chicago with his family while still a child, and began playing the baritone saxophone. He gigged with local artists like Otis Rush, Syl Johnson, Alvin Cash, and Harold Burrage while in his twenties. In Chicago Brunswick Records employed four R&B arrangers: Willie Henderson, Tom Washington, James Mack and Sonny Sanders.

Henderson and producer Carl Davis did arrangements for musicians such as Chi-Lites, Tyrone Davis, The Artistics, Jackie Wilson and Barbara Acklin. Henderson played on many of these records and also did some production work himself, especially for Tyrone Davis, with whom he had a string of R&B and Hot 100 hits in the late 1960s and early 1970s on Brunswick subsidiary, Dakar.

Henderson also released several singles, which included "Funky Chicken (Part I)", as Willie Henderson and the Soul Explosions (#22 R&B, #91 pop); the Lowrell Simon-written 1974 instrumental "Dance Master", "Break Your Back" and "Gangster Boogie Bump", on Playboy Records. He also released two albums on Brunswick in 1970 and 1974.

Henderson left Brunswick in 1974 and began working independently as a producer. He produced the group Essence for Epic Records and former Brunswick singer, Barbara Acklin for Capitol Records.

== Career ==
=== 1970s ===
In 1970, Willie Henderson & The Soul Explosions released the single "Funky Chicken (Part 1)" bw "Funky Chicken (Part 2)" on Brunswick 755429. For the week ending February 7, 1970, Willie Henderson & the Soul Explosions' "Funky Chicken (Pt. 1)" had entered the Record World Top 50 R&B chart at #45. Also, on that week in the same chart, Rufus Thomas's single, "Do the Funky Chicken" had moved up from #41 to #26. It was also at #1 on the Nor Cal One Stop (San Francisco) chart, ahead of Rufus Thomas's version which was at #2. "Bridge over Troubled Water" by Simon and Garfunkel was at #3.

Two singles that Henderson produced "Love Uprising" by Otis Leavill (Dakar 620) and "Let Me Back In" by Tyrone Davis (Dakar 621) were released in October, 1970.

In a Record World article dated May 12, 1973, it was confirmed that Henderson had resigned from the Chicago branch of Brunswick Records where he held the positions of music director and producer. He was now heading his own production company, Now Sound Records. With nothing set in concrete for national distribution, he had taken on veteran record administrator Don Clay as his administration assistant. One role for Clay was to set policies for the new label. One new act he had already signed to his label was night club performer and singer, Ms. Azie Mortimer. Henderson was also releasing his own recording "Dance Master" on the label.

He produced the single "I Wish It Was Me" for Tyrone Davis. Reviewed in the Hits of the Week section of Record World's Jan 5, 1974 issue, the reviewer said it was every bit as good as David's hit from the previous year, "There it Is". The review also said that it was a terrific Henderson production full of hit sounds and riffs.

For the week ending July 13, 1974, funky instrumental "Dance Master Part 1" was at #95, and had been in the Cash Box Top 100 chart for two weeks. It entered the Record World Singles chart at #85 on June 22. "Dance Master" had also moved up from #65 to #53 on the Record World R&B Singles chart.

He and Hilltak Records president Hillery Johnson put together a group called Broadway that had four female singers, with the lead singer was Patti Williams. They were signed to the Hilltak label. He co-composed most of their album which was released on the label. In April, Broadway brought in another chart hit for Hilltak Records with Henderson's composition, "This Funk is Made for Dancing" which got to #83 on the R&B chart.

=== 1980s to 1990s ===
Henderson produced funk band Magnum Force's album "Share My Love" with Carl Davis. He continued to produce into the 1980s and occasionally self-releasing singles on his label, NowSound. He formed the Chicago Music Organization in 1999.

=== later years ===
As of 2016, he was still booking gigs and was in the horn section of the Otis Rush tribute at the 2016 Chicago Blues Festival.

== Discography ==
With Bo Diddley

- The London Bo Diddley Sessions (Chess, 1973)

With Donny Hathaway

- Everything Is Everything (Atco, 1970)

With Eddie Harris

- Eddie Harris Sings the Blues (Atlantic, 1972)
