= Smoke Signals (Smokey Robinson album) =

Studio album by Smokey Robinson
- Released: 1986
- Recorded: 1986
- Genres: R&B, soul
- Length: 42:53
- Languages: English, Spanish
- Label: Motown
- Producers: Smokey Robinson, Reginald "Sonny" Burke

Smokey Robinson chronology
Essar (1984)	Smoke Signals (1986)	One Heartbeat (1987)

Smoke Signals is the thirteenth studio album by the American musician Smokey Robinson, released in 1986 by Motown. "Be Kind to the Growing Mind", featuring the Temptations, encourages songwriters to avoid distasteful lyrics. "Hold On to Your Love" was written with Stevie Wonder. Robinson supported the album with a North American tour.

== Critical reception ==
The Houston Chronicle wrote: "Less personal than many of his solo projects, Smoke Signals is reassuring, if not a renewal for Robinson." The San Diego Union-Tribune noted that Robinson "retains his inimitable sense of cheerful optimism and wholesomeness." The Chicago Sun-Times deemed the album "a little too much in the middle-of-the-road."

== Track listing ==
All tracks composed by Smokey Robinson; except where indicated

1. "Some People (Will Do Anything for Love)" (Bobby Sandstrom, Michael Price) - 4:22
2. "Sleepless Nights" (Alan Gorrie, Michael Mugrage) - 4:07
3. "Because of You (It's the Best It's Ever Been)" - 4:12
4. "Be Kind to the Growing Mind" (featuring the Temptations) - 4:45
5. "Te Quiero Como Si No Hubiera Un Mañana (I'm Gonna Love You Like There's No Tomorrow)" (Robinson, Ivory Stone, Mark Davis) - 4:21
6. "Hold On to Your Love" (Robinson, Stevie Wonder) - 5:12
7. "Photograph in My Mind" (J.C. Crowley, Tom Campbell) - 3:51
8. "No Time to Stop Believing" (Don Black, Simon Climie) - 4:11
9. "Wishful Thinking" (Bobby Sandstrom, Michael Price, David Paul Bryant) - 4:05
10. "Hanging On by a Thread" (Robinson, Davis) - 3:45

== Personnel ==
- Smokey Robinson – lead vocals
- Bobby Sandstrom – synthesizers (1, 9), bass (1), drum programming (1, 9), backing vocals (1), BGV arrangements (1), keyboards (9), arrangements (9)
- John Hobbs – keyboards (2, 10), synthesizers (2, 10), arrangements (2, 10), acoustic piano (4, 5)
- Jim Lang – keyboards (3, 6), synthesizers (3), arrangements (3, 6), bass (6), drum programming (6)
- Michael Boddicker – arrangements (4), synthesizers (5)
- Michael Omartian – arrangements (4), additional keyboards (6), additional synthesizers (6)
- Tony Peluso – arrangements (2–4), additional synthesizers (5), guitar solo (9, 10)
- Robbie Buchanan – synthesizer solo (5), synthesizers (7, 8), bass (7, 8), drum programming (7, 8), arrangements (7, 8)
- Paul Jackson Jr. – guitars (1–9)
- Neil Stubenhaus – bass guitar (2, 4, 5, 9, 10)
- Mike Baird – drums (2, 6, 10)
- John Robinson – drums (3, 4, 5)
- Freddy Alwag – drum programming (3)
- Vinnie Colaiuta – drums (7, 8)
- Paulinho da Costa – percussion (1, 2, 5, 9)
- Steve Barri – additional percussion (2, 5), percussion (4)
- Greg Adams – horn arrangements (1, 9)
- Tower of Power Horns (Emilio Castillo, Greg Adams, Mike Cichowicz, Richard Elliot, Stephen Kupka) – horns (1, 9)
- Richard Elliot – lyricon solo (2, 3), saxophone (8)
- Calvin Davis – alto saxophone (5)
- Michael Jacobsen – tenor saxophone (5)
- Fred Smith – tenor saxophone (5)
- Herb Alpert – trumpet solo (5)
- Mark Davis – arrangements (3, 5)
- Stevie Wonder – arrangements (6)
- David Bryant – arrangements (9)
- Michael Lovesmith – backing vocals (1, 2, 10), BGV arrangements (1)
- Maureen Steele – backing vocals (1, 2)
- Richard Carpenter – backing vocals (2, 10), BGV arrangements (2, 10), additional keyboards (10)
- Brenda Eager – backing vocals (3, 5, 6), additional backing vocals (4)
- Patricia Henley – backing vocals (3, 5, 6), additional backing vocals (4)
- Ivory Stone – backing vocals (3, 5, 6, 9), additional backing vocals (4)
- The Temptations – backing vocals (4)
- Bunny DeBarge – backing vocals (6)
- Mark DeBarge – backing vocals (6)
- Howard Smith – backing vocals (6)
- Phillip Ingram – backing vocals (7, 8)
- Dennis Lambert – backing vocals (7, 8)
- Darryl Phinnessee – backing vocals (7, 8)
- Oren Waters – backing vocals (7, 8)
- Julie Waters – backing vocals (9)
- Maxine Waters – backing vocals (9)

Production

- Executive producer – Steve Barri
- Producers – Steve Barri; Tony Peluso (Tracks 1–6, 9 & 10); Mark Davis (Track 5); Smokey Robinson (Track 5); Dennis Lambert (Tracks 7 & 8).
- Co-producer on Tracks 7 & 8 – Robbie Buchanan
- Engineers – Tony Peluso (Tracks 1–6, 9 & 10); Dennis McKay and Jack Joseph Puig (Tracks 7 & 8).
- Second engineers – Sabrina Buchanek (Tracks 1–6, 9 & 10); Bino Espinoza; Toni Greene (Tracks 1–6, 9 & 10); Karen Siegel (Tracks 1–6, 9 & 10); Steve Ford (Tracks 7 & 8).
- Recorded at Hitsville U.S.A. Recording Studios (Hollywood, CA); Monkey Dust Studio (Granada Hills, CA); Soundcastle Studio Center (Los Angeles, CA).
- Mixing – Tony Peluso (Tracks 1–6, 9 & 10); Jack Joseph Puig (Tracks 7 & 8).
- Mixed at Mama Jo's Recording Studio (Hollywood, CA).
- Mastered by Steve Hall at Future Disc (Hollywood, CA).
- Album coordinator – Gail Pierson
- Art direction – Johnny Lee
- Design – Janet Levinson
- Photography – Ron Slenzak
