= Tim Feehan =

Canadian singer-songwriter (born 1957)

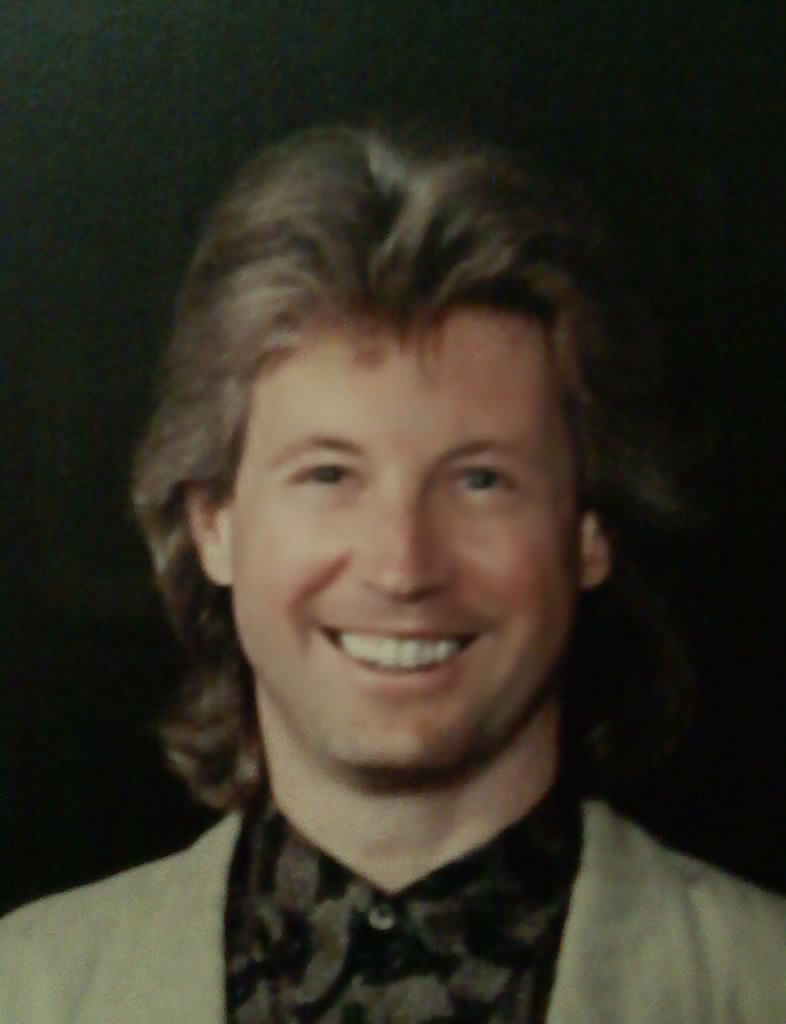

Background information
- Born: Timothy Joseph Feehan; April 27, 1957 (age 69)
- Origin: Edmonton, Alberta, Canada
- Genres: Pop, rock
- Occupations: Singer-songwriter, musician, record producer, studio owner, mix master
- Instruments: Vocals, piano, guitar
- Years active: 1977-present
- Labels: Mustard, Scotti Brothers, MCA, Park Drive Publishing
- Website: www.parkdriveproductions.com

Tim Feehan (born April 27, 1957 in Edmonton, Alberta) is a Canadian singer-songwriter, producer, mix master and Los Angeles area studio owner.

== Career ==
Tim Feehan graduated from the University of Alberta in 1980 and began his recording/songwriting career quite accidentally when his college band Footloose was asked by a local studio owner to record a song he'd written. That song, "Leaving for Maui", was a Top Ten hit in Hawaii.

In 1986, Feehan entered a songwriting contest sponsored by producer David Foster (Celine Dion, Whitney Houston) taking first place and signed with Scotti Bros/CBS in Los Angeles where he relocated later that year. The self-titled debut album Tim Feehan was released in 1987 and gained five A.R.I.A. (Alberta Recording Industry Association) awards including "Best Pop Performance" and "Producer of the Year". The first single "Where's the Fire" was chosen as the theme song for the Charlie Sheen motion picture and cult favorite The Wraith. In 1987, Tim also won the Canadian Academy of Arts & Sciences Juno Award for "Most Promising Male Vocalist".

In the late 1980s, Feehan signed with MCA records and released Full Contact, which featured collaborations with songwriters Bruce Gaitsch ("La Isla Bonita" Madonna), Gene Black ("Never" Heart), and Marc Jordan ("Rhythm of My Heart" Rod Stewart). Musicians included American Idol judge Randy Jackson of Journey, Steve Lukather (Toto), Timothy B. Schmit (Eagles), and Richard Marx. During the down time, Tim sang and produced "Dirty Love" which appeared in the James Bond film Licence to Kill and performed on both the Arthur 2: On the Rocks theme and the Dionne Warwick gold album Reservations for Two. Feehan wrote "Heart in Pieces" for the million selling album Chicago 19 and performed in the video "Stop the Madness" alongside Whitney Houston for the Nancy Reagan anti-drug campaign "Just Say No".

In 1987, Feehan was lead singer in the David Foster All-Star World Tour featuring Lee Ritenour (guitar), Nathan East (bass) and Vinnie Colaiuta (drums). In 1993, Tim co-purchased the "Backroom" recording studio in Glendale, California. In 1996, Feehan released the album Pray for Rain, and co-wrote and produced the critically acclaimed The Color of Silence for quadruple platinum selling teen pop star Tiffany.

On August 27, 1989, Feehan's song, "Memories Will Last Forever", was played when the Edmonton Oilers honoured Wayne Gretzky with the unveiling of his bronze statue. This song was also used for Wayne Gretzky's retirement jersey ceremony on October 1, 1999 in Edmonton, Alberta.

In the 2000s, Feehan continued to work with numerous LA area artists including Brian McKnight, Boyz II Men, Bone Thugs-n-Harmony, and Sergio Vallin from Mexican supergroup Mana while penning songs for such diverse acts as Krayzie Bone, Eddie Money and Kina (musician).

Feehan has had dozens of his songs appear on episodic television including Desperate Housewives, Brothers and Sisters, My Name Is Earl, Ugly Betty, The Good Wife, Boston Legal, Dexter, Las Vegas, The Hills, Entourage, The City, One Tree Hill, Norbit, Greek, Numb3rs and others.

In the spring of 2012, Tim Feehan created "ParkDriveProductions.com", a Los Angeles–based boutique music production company. This new website is home to a lifetime of Tim's original work. It also features an array of indie artists and self-published master recordings available for licensing. Among them is up-and-coming California pop artist Hannah Ruick, daughter of legendary Toto singer Joseph Williams, Los Angeles–based Agina Alvarez who just won a spot on Team Adam Levine on the NBC hit show The Voice on Tuesday April 2, 2013, and Canadian singer-songwriter Cadence Burns.

== Discography ==
=== Studio albums ===
- Sneak Preview (1981)
- Carmalita (1983)
- Tim Feehan (1987)
- Full Contact (1990)
- Pray for Rain (1996)

=== Compilation albums ===
- Tracks I Forgot About (2003)

=== with Footloose ===
- Footloose (1980)

=== Singles ===
- "Leaving for Maui" (with Footloose) (1980) (#74 CAN) (#29 CAN AC)
- "Jamie" (with Footloose) (1980)
- "Just Enough Love" (with Footloose) (1980)
- "Go Ahead and Break My Heart" (1981)
- "Give us Your Name" (1981)
- "Never Say Die" (duet with Vikki Moss) (1983) (#23 CAN AC)
- "Carmalita" (1983)
- "Read Between the Lines" (1984)
- "Where's the Fire" (1986) (#59 CAN) (#18 CAN AC)
- "Listen for the Heartbeat" (1987)
- "Mean Streak" (1988)
- "Landslide" (1988)
- "Dirty Love" (1989)
- "Heart in Pieces" (1990) (#42 CAN)
- "Look Before You Leap" (1990)
- "Dive" (1991)
- "Can't Let Go" (1991)
- "Worth a Fight" (1996)
- "You Should be Mine" (1996)
- "Memories Will Last Forever" (1999)
- "February Snow" (2002)
- "Love Junkie" (2003)
- "Forever Mine" (2003)

==== Soundtrack appearances ====
Title	Release	Soundtrack
"Where's the Fire"	1986	The Wraith
"Dirty Love"	1989	Licence to Kill
