= Let Me Show You =

1990 song by the Black Flames

Single by The Black Flames

from the album The Black Flames
- A-side: "Let Me Show You" (radio mix)" "Let Me Show You" (UK radio mix)
- B-side: "Let Me Show You" (New - New Kirk extended mix) "Let Me Show You" (New - New Kirk instrumental)
- Released: 1990
- Label: Columbia
- Songwriters: D. Newkirk, M. Davis
- Producers: Newkirk; Mark Davis (co-producer)

The Black Flames singles chronology
"Dance with Me" (1990)	"Let Me Show You" (1990)

"Let Me Show You" is a song by the Black Flames. It was a hit single for the group in 1991.

== Background ==
The song was written by Don Newkirk and Mark Davis. The 12" version was released on Columbia 44 73589 in 1990.

== Reception ==
On the week of 19 January, 1991, Billboard columnist Terri Rossi noted the debut of the single and wrote, "A job well done by Eddie Pugh, VP of R&B promotion".

== Airplay ==
In the 19 January Billboard Hot R&B Singles action list, for "Let me Show You", there were five silver adds (25 reporters), 17 bronze secondary adds (58 reporters) making a total of 22 adds.

== Chart performance ==
On 19 January 1991, "Let Me Show You" made its debut at No. 88 on the Billboard R&B chart. On the week of 2 March, the single debuted at No. 34 in the Sales section of the Hot R&B Singles Sales & Airplay chart, and had moved up from No. 39 to No. 37 in the chart's Airplay section. The following week, the single was at No. 38 in the chart's sales section. It was still registering at No. 99 on the week of 23 March.

"Let Me Show You" made its debut at No. 78 on the Cash Box Top R&B Singles chart on the week of 2 February 1991. There was also another song with the same title by Lorenzo Smith at No. 97 on the same chart. At week five, the single reached its peak position of No. 50 on the week of 2 March. It held that position for another week. It spent a total of nine weeks on the chart.

The song also made the Black Radio Executive chart and on the week of 8 February on week three, it had moved up from No. 77 to No. 61. At week eight, the single peaked at No. 33 on the week of 15 March.
