= Let's Dance (9th Creation song) =

Song by 9th Creation

from the album Superheroes
- B-side: "Shucks, You're Fine"
- Released: 1979
- Length: 3:32
- Label: Hilltak PW 7901
- Songwriters: A. D. Burrise, J. D. Burrise, Don Allen
- Producer: J. D. Burrise

9th Creation singles chronology
"Got My Baby Back" (1979)	"Let's Dance" (1979)	"Mellow Music" (1982)

"Let's Dance" was a hit for R&B funk group 9th Creation in 1979. It made it to the Billboard, Cash Box and Record World charts.

== Background ==
"Let's Dance" bw "Shucks, You're Fine" was released on Hilltak PW 7901 in 1979. Along with "Steppin'" by The Gap Band, "The Same Thing (Makes You Laugh, Makes You Cry)" by Sly & the Family Stone and "Half a Love" by Aretha Franklin etc., it was a recommended song in Billboard's Top Single Picks for the week ending November 24, 1979. In December, 1979, it was "programmers Pick by J.J. Jefferies of KSOL in San Francisco.

The record peaked spent a total of ten weeks in the Billboard Hot Soul Singles chart, peaking at #45 on December 15, 1979. It also spent eleven weeks in the Cash Box Top 100 chart, peaking at #53 on December 12th., and it peaked at #47 on January 19th, 1980, having spent a total of seven weeks in the Record World Black Oriented Singles chart.

Decades later, Jerome Deradji arranged an interview between Fitzroy of the Soul Survivors magazine and A. D. Burrise in 2018. Burrise was explaining that "Let's Dance" was like George Duke funk and also cited Duke as an influence for him to write the song.

== Charts ==
Chart (1979)	Peak position
US Hot Soul Singles (Billboard)	45
US Top 100 (Cash Box)	53
US Black Oriented Singles (Record World)	47
