= Vikki Moss =

Canadian singer (born 1962)

Vikki Moss (born Victoria Moss; 1962) is a Canadian singer.

== Career ==
Moss' first appearance on the Canadian music scene was a 1983 duet with Tim Feehan entitled "Never Say Die", that hit No. 1 on the Canadian A/C charts. Originally from Edmonton, Alberta, she has had a long-time association with famed producer David Foster. She sang lead vocal for "Love at Second Sight", a song from his first solo album The Best of Me, and most notably on a track on the St. Elmo's Fire soundtrack entitled "If I Turn You Away", co-written by Foster and Richard Marx. She has also appeared on various Japanese TV soundtracks, including "Whispers at Night" from Abunai Deka.

== Personal life ==
Moss dated NHL superstar Wayne Gretzky when he played for the Edmonton Oilers in the 1980s. In February 1982, Moss received a Ford Mustang convertible from Edmonton Oilers (and Ford dealership) owner Peter Pocklington, when Gretzky broke the NHL single season goal scoring record.

Moss is the sister of the Edmonton Oilers and Edmonton Eskimos locker room attendant and personality Joey Moss, who died in 2020.
