= On the Inside (song) =

Single by Lynne Hamilton

from the album On the Inside
- B-side: Love Theme from "Prisoner Cell Block H"
- Released: March 1979
- Recorded: 1978
- Genre: Pop
- Length: 3:10
- Label: A1
- Songwriter(s): Allan Caswell

Lynne Hamilton singles chronology
"On the Inside" (1979)	"Sorry" (1980)

"On the Inside" is the theme song for the Australian soap opera Prisoner (known as Prisoner: Cell Block H in some territories). It was written by Allan Caswell and performed by Lynne Hamilton.

== Background and recording ==
Caswell recalls that his "publisher was having lunch with a guy from Grundy's one Friday and asked what they had coming up. They already had music for Prisoner, but the final decision was being made on the Monday and if we could get something to them by then they'd listen to it. I didn't get a chance to work on it until the Sunday afternoon. It was like buying a lottery ticket – either I write something and it might get accepted or I don't write something and not give myself a chance." Caswell recorded the song on a portable cassette player "and gave it to his publisher who delivered it without listening to it. Within five days, I was in the studio with Lynne Hamilton. She got half way through the song and burst into tears. Anyone who believed in it like that was going to do a good version of it."

An alternative version of this song was used in the credits of the Season One finale, Episode 79, and again in Episode 151. On this version, there is a small guitar intro and the orchestration is slightly different. This particular version is not available on the soundtrack and was only used during the credits at the end of the show on rare occasions. The song alternated with an orchestra-only version of this track during the first two seasons.

== Charts ==
=== Weekly charts ===
The song was a hit in Australia in 1979 when the television show was launched, and reached number three on the UK Singles Chart in 1989 when the show attracted millions of viewers in its late night slot in ITV regions.

Chart (1979–1981)	Peak position
Australia (Kent Music Report)	4
New Zealand (Recorded Music NZ)	5

Chart (1989)	Peak position
Ireland (IRMA)	11
UK Singles (OCC)	3

=== Year-end charts ===
Chart (1979)	Position
Australia (Kent Music Report)	23

== Track listings ==
Australian 7" single (RCA Victor – 103316)

- Side A "On the Inside" – 3:11
- Side B "Love Theme from "Prisoner"" performed by William Mottling Orchestra – 2:23

== Alleged infringement ==
In 2009, writer Allan Caswell alleged that Alabama's song "Christmas in Dixie" was 'ripped off' from "On the Inside", but conceded that legal action was unlikely as both he and Alabama were signed to Sony.

== Cover versions ==
The song was recorded as a slower country ballad by Patti Page; coincidently the series of Prisoner was enormously popular in the United States, where it was known as Prisoner: Cell Block H.

The song was rerecorded and released by singer Ella Hooper to coincide with Foxtel's Australian re-run of the series, which started in March 2011.

It was also covered by the Living End, titled "Prisoner on the Inside".

== Use in Wentworth revival ==
Although the song was not used as the theme for Wentworth, the 2013 reimagining of Prisoner, it was briefly heard in the pilot episode, being hummed by Jacs Holt (played by Kris McQuade), the show's main antagonist. The original Lynn Hamilton single version of "On the Inside" was, however, used on the closing credits of the final episode of Wentworth (titled "Legacy") in Australia, which aired 26 October 2021, whilst a modern cover version was used on the UK broadcast on Five Star later the same day.

== Releases ==
It was released in the United States on Hilltak 7903.
