= The Color of Silence =

Studio album by Tiffany
- Released: November 7, 2000
- Genre: Pop rock
- Length: 62:02
- Label: Eureka
- Producer: Tim Feehan

Tiffany chronology
Greatest Hits (1996)	The Color of Silence (2000)	Dust Off and Dance (2005)

Singles from The Color of Silence
- 1. "I'm Not Sleeping" Released: September 26, 2000; 2. "Open My Eyes" Released: August 21, 2001

The Color of Silence is the fifth studio album by American singer Tiffany, released on November 7, 2000. It marked a comeback for the artist, serving as her first studio album in seven years and her first U.S. release in a decade. The album followed Tiffany's return to California after several years living in Nashville, Tennessee, where she worked to develop her songwriting and explored a potential shift toward country music. The track "Open My Eyes" was later featured in the film BearCity (2010).

== Background ==
After the success of her first two albums, Tiffany and Hold an Old Friend's Hand, Tiffany shifted her musical direction from teen pop toward R&B and new jack swing for her third album, New Inside. Growing frustration with the music industry led her to adopt a more mature, sexier image as she attempted to gain more creative control. New Inside was released on September 25, 1990, by MCA Records. It received mixed reviews; critics described the production as overly polished and felt Tiffany was unconvincing as an R&B vocalist. Commercially, the album failed to chart in the United States and produced no singles that entered the Billboard charts, though it achieved moderate success in Japan. Her fourth album, Dreams Never Die, marked a return to pop music, but it was released exclusively in Asia on November 21, 1993.

Struggling with alcohol and drug problems, Tiffany was persuaded by her longtime bodyguard, Frank D'Amato, to reassess her life and career. Exhausted by her residency at the Las Vegas Hilton and recognizing that the industry had moved on, she chose to take a hiatus to focus on family and personal recovery. In 1995, she moved to Nashville to work on songwriting while attempting a comeback as a country music artist. There, she collaborated with industry professionals who recognized her potential. Although she began recording demos for country material, she eventually concluded that she “isn't a country kind of girl.” She also admitted she had long been “shy as a writer” and unsure of how to translate her ideas into lyrics. After several years in Nashville, she moved back to California to begin work on her fifth album, which afforded her the biggest creative control of her career.

== Production ==
After moving back to California, Tiffany met producer Brad Schmidt through a mutual friend. For the first three months, their working relationship was difficult, as Tiffany struggled with relinquishing creative control after years of self-direction. Despite these challenges, she wrote several songs influenced by the works of Bonnie Raitt and Melissa Etheridge.

Tiffany also met and collaborated with Tim Feehan on a number of potential tracks for the album, but she ultimately felt they were "too adult contemporary" and decided not to include them. The first song written for the album, "Silence", endured despite the rocky collaboration; at one point, Tiffany and Feehan considered ending their partnership due to creative differences. Tiffany later said that completing the song made her feel "more confident" and helped her solidify a personal musical "style" through their work together.

Following the death of her longtime bodyguard Frank D'Amato from cancer at the age of 34, Tiffany composed the melody and wrote the first two lines of the lyrics for "If Only", which was later completed by Joe Brooks. She has said that beginning the song helped her process her grief over D'Amato's death. Brooks also wrote "Betty" and gave it to Tiffany, encouraging her to interpret it in her own way, even though she felt that his original version was already strong.

== Music and lyrics ==
=== Overview ===
The Color of Silence reflects Tiffany's life at the time of its creation. The album explores themes such as femme-power messaging and alternative angst. Recurring motifs include pain, frustration, longing, and desire. The Color of Silence is primarily a pop rock album, incorporating elements of dance, blues, gospel, and electronica. Tiffany co-wrote seven songs on the standard edition of the album.

Considered her most autobiographical work to date, Tiffany stated in a November 3, 2000 interview with Shawn Winstian of the Herald News Service that she contributed not only her voice but also her "heart and soul" by writing the majority of the tracks.

=== Songs ===
"Open My Eyes" is a "guitar-etched" pop rock song in which Tiffany asks a man to "open [her] eyes" so she can move on and find resolution. Tiffany described it as a "very strong song for a woman". "I'm Not Sleeping" is an emotional and verbal abuse song told from a female point of view, expressing that she "lost a big chunk of herself and regained her power", ultimately emancipating herself and refusing to "go back to try and prove anything to him." Music critic Melissa Ruggieri stated that the track is the album's "first indication of maturity". The song features a pop rock hook, "rocky" rhythms, African drums, guitar strums, "slow-building" basslines, and minimal keyboard effects. It also includes a guest rap by Krayzie Bone. According to Tiffany, its production was inspired by "Voices Carry" by 'Til Tuesday.

Accompanied by melancholic guitars, a marching band cadence, and bagpipes, "Piss U Off" depicts Tiffany being "dumped", as she "succinctly puts it, but with a twist". The lyrics compare two lovers to hostile neighbors. "I Will Not Breakdown" features Tiffany singing in a "decidedly sassy mood" with a "touch of diva attitude". The song describes her refusal to break down under difficult circumstances or to "[give] in to people and their negative opinions of [her]". Ruggieri wrote that the "ghost of Alanis Morissette floats through the insinuating guitars and beefy chorus". "Keep Walking" is a "bittersweet" love song. Michael Paoletta of Billboard described its production as "reminiscent of an Oasis track".

"If Only" is a piano-driven ballad dedicated to Tiffany's bodyguard Frank D'Amato. The first verses reflect Tiffany's feelings about his death. "Silence" is an autobiographical rock song influenced by Middle Eastern music, describing Tiffany's struggle with her past. "All the Talking" is an acoustic pop track about the tension between dreams and reality. "Good Enough for Me" expresses Tiffany's call for unity and nonjudgment. "Christening" is a funk song centered on female independence. "Betty" is a ballad offering a "bittersweet tale" about a girl who committed suicide. "Cinnamon" is a downtempo guitar-driven track about a girl who is a "Jezebel [and] a big mess". "Butterfly" focuses on Tiffany's theme of personal growth.

== Release ==
Originally, The Color of Silence was planned for release on Modern Records, but the project was later moved to Eureka Records. The album was initially scheduled for release on October 10, 2000. It was released on November 7, 2000.

== Critical reception ==
Professional ratings
Review scores
Source	Rating
AllMusic	3/5 stars
MTV Asia	3/5 stars

The Color of Silence received positive reviews and is considered Tiffany's most critically acclaimed album to date. A front-page article in Billboard described the record as "thoughtful, intelligent, and full of grace," and suggested it could be regarded as "Tiffany's equivalent to Alanis Morissette's landmark Jagged Little Pill." Music critic Melissa Rugglerl gave the album a "B+", praising "Piss U Off" as "clever".

Peter Fawthrop of AllMusic awarded it three out of five stars, highlighting "Piss U Off", "Silence", and "Betty". He commended "Piss U Off" for its "boasting, clever lyrics" and "one of the great melodies on an album filled with hooks", and characterized the album as "extravagant and unbridled, spilling with good ideas molded into eclectic rock pieces and passionate pop songs and ballads." MTV Asia also rated the album three out of five stars, selecting "Open My Eyes", "I'm Not Sleeping", "Silence", and "Good Enough For Me" as "Choice Cuts".

== Track listing ==
Standard edition
No.	Title	Writer(s)	Length
1.	"Open My Eyes"	Joe Brooks; Tim Feehan	4:32
2.	"I'm Not Sleeping (featuring Krayzie Bone)"	Tiffany; Brooks; Feehan; Anthony Henderson	3:39
3.	"Piss U Off"	Tiffany; Brooks; Feehan	3:48
4.	"I Will Not Breakdown"	Tiffany; Brooks; Gene Black	4:12
5.	"Keep Walking"	Cary Devore; Scott Shiflett	3:37
6.	"If Only"	Tiffany; Brooks	4:13
7.	"Silence"	Tiffany; Feehan; Black	4:15
8.	"All the Talking"	Tiffany; Brooks; Feehan	3:55
9.	"Good Enough for Me"	Tiffany; Brooks; Feehan; Black	4:12
10.	"Christening"	Ovis	4:17
11.	"Betty"	Brooks	4:29
12.	"Cinnamon"	Tiffany; Brooks; Feehan	4:42
13.	"Butterfly"	Brooks; Feehan	3:43
Total length:			62:02

Bonus tracks on international release
No.	Title	Writer(s)	Length
14.	"As I Am"	Tiffany	2:36
15.	"Falling"	Tiffany; Feehan	3:57
16.	"Flown"	Tiffany; Feehan	4:30
Total length:			73:05

Bonus tracks on download version
No.	Title	Writer(s)	Length
14.	"Sometimes"	Tiffany; Feehan	4:41
15.	"As I Am"
Total length:			69:19

== Personnel ==
- Tiffany – lead vocals, backing vocals (1, 3, 7, 10, 12, 13)
- Tim Feehan – keyboards (1, 2, 4, 7, 8, 13, 15), electric bass (1–4, 7–9, 11–13, 15), drum programming (1–4, 7–9, 11–13, 15), backing vocals (1, 4, 7–9, 13, 14), synthesizers (3, 6, 9, 11), accordion (3), bagpipes (3), guitars (9), all instruments (16)
- Cary Devore – acoustic piano (5)
- Joe Brooks – guitars (1–3, 6, 8, 9, 11–13), backing vocals (1, 2, 4, 8, 12, 13), synthesizers (2, 6, 11), Wurlitzer electric piano (3, 8), additional synthesizers (3, 9), harmonica (3, 8), acoustic piano (6, 11), keyboards (12)
- David Frederic – additional electric guitars (1), guitars (4)
- Gene Black – guitars (4, 7, 9, 15), electric sitar (7)
- John Thomas – guitars (5)
- Cisco De Luna – additional guitars (10)
- Romeo Antonio – guitars (12)
- Brent Hoffert – electric guitars (14)
- Mark Dutton – bass (5)
- Clark Souter – bass (14)
- Herman Matthews – drums (2, 4, 7, 12)
- Mark Wickliffe – drums (5)
- Michael Fisher – percussion (2, 6, 9, 11), kalimba (2), vibraphone (9), tambora (9)
- David "Ovis" Means – percussion (5), backing vocals (5, 7), additional synthesizers (8), all instruments (10), keyboards (14), drums (14)
- Krayzie Bone – rap (2)
- Doug Elkins – backing vocals (7)
- Ked – backing vocals (8)
- London Jones – backing vocals (9, 11, 15, 16)

== Production ==
- Tiffany – production supervisor, exclusive management
- Tim Feehan – producer (1–4, 7–9, 11–13, 15, 16), mixing (1–3, 6–9, 11–13, 15, 16)
- David "Ovis" Means – producer (5, 14), mixing (5, 10, 14), recording (10, 14), Pro Tools mix engineer (10)
- Joe Brooks – producer (6, 11)
- Jerry Christie – recording (1–4, 6–9, 11–13, 15, 16), Pro Tools mix engineer (12)
- Paul Wagner – recording (5, 10, 14)
- David Frederic – Pro Tools mix engineer (1–9, 11, 13), recording (5), mixing (5)
- Robert Biles – mixing (1–4, 6–9, 11–13, 15, 16)
- Glenn Sweitzer – art direction, design
- Ron Davis – photography, exclusive management
- Brad Schmidt – exclusive management
- Calvin Haugen – stylist
- Lynn Rodgers – hair, make-up
- Bulmaro Garcia – hair, make-up (center spread)
