= Tailgate (song) =

Single by 21st Creation

from the album Break Thru
- A-side: "Tailgate"
- B-side: "Mr. Disco Radio"
- Released: 1977
- Length: 2:46
- Composer: A. Philips-M. Davis-T. Jackson
- Producer: Mark Davis

"Tailgate" a.k.a. "Tail Gate" was a 1977 single for American R&B group 21st Creation. It was a hit for them that year, charting on the Cash Box Top 100 R&B chart and the Billboard National Disco Action Top 40 chart.

== Background ==
The song was written by Artis Phillips, Mark Davis and McKinley Jackson. It was issued in the US on Gordy 7154. It was released in the UK on Motown TMG 1075 (E).

The back-to-back release of the song with "Born Again" by Eddie Kendricks was released on Motown M-00006D1.

== Reception ==
According to the 4 June issue of RPM Weekly, "Tailgate" was one of the upcoming 7 and 12-inch singles that were to be released that week. Besides 21st Creation's single, Vitamin U by Smokey Robinson was another single that Motown Records were enthusiastic about. Discos in Canada had been importing the 12" version of the song and there was a strong reaction.

It was mentioned in the 11 June issue of Record World that John Luongo had made a prediction that "Tailgate" would do well in clubs. A survey of clubs was made by Record World. They had an excellent response from most of them. The record had also been issued as a 5:45 version and Motown had issued it back-to-back with a remix of "Born Again" by Eddie Kendricks.

== Airplay ==
It was noted in the 14 May issue of Cash Box that "Tailgate" had been added to the playlist of WESL in St. Louis.

According to the 28 May issue of Cash Box, "Tailgate" had been added to the playlists of WJPC in Chicago and WLBS in New York.

== Club play ==
As shown in the 28 May issue of Record World, "Tailgate" was on the Discotheque Hit Parade, with action at the Fantasia in New York. The following week it was seeing action at the Playground in New York and at the Experiment, also in New York.

== Charts ==
The single debuted at 100 on the Cash Box Top 100 R&B chart for the week of 4 June 1977. It reached the peak position of no. 95 on the week of 25 June and held the position for another week.

For the week of 25 May, "Tailgate" debuted at no. 39 on the Billboard National Disco Action Top 40 chart. The following week it moved up to no. 37 before disappearing on the week of 11 June.

For the week of 25 June, "Tailgate" made its re-entry at no. 32 on the Billboard National Disco Action Top 40 chart. The following week it had moved up one notch to no. 31. It was also at no. 11 in the Los Angeles / San Diego, and no. 10 on the Pittsburgh sections of the Billboard's Disco Action chart.
