= Kina Grannis discography =

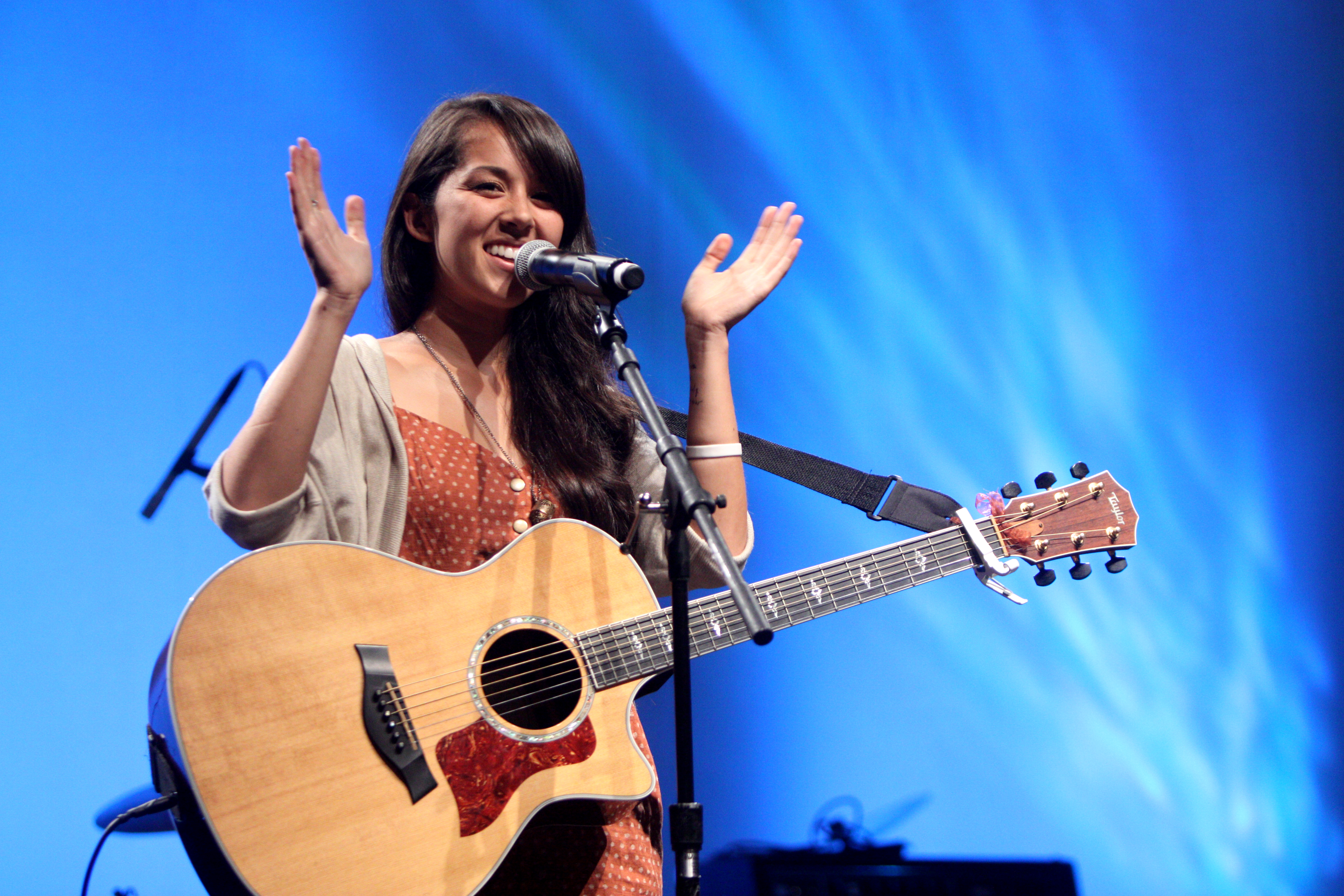
- Kina Grannis performing at VidCon 2012 at the Anaheim Convention Center
- Studio albums: 6
- Live albums: 1
- Singles: 7
- Music videos: 11

The discography of American guitarist and singer-songwriter Kina Grannis consists of six studio albums, one live album, and seven singles.

== Albums ==
=== Studio albums ===
Title	Album details	Track list
Sincerely, Me.	Released: 12 January 2006; Format: CD, digital download	Track list: 1. "Blindly"; 2. "Highlighted in Green"; 3. "Next Time"; 4. "Try"; 5. "Another Day"; 6. "People"
One More in the Attic	Released: 23 August 2006; Format: CD, digital download	Track list: 1. "Living in Dreams"; 2. "Why Can't I?"; 3. "Never Never"; 4. "Some Days"; 5. "What Is Said"; 6. "In Theory"; 7. "Wandering and Wondering"; 8. "Running Away"; 9. "Missing You"; 10. "Alone Together" (CD Bonus Track)
In Memory of the Singing Bridge	Released: 24 August 2006; Format: CD, digital download	Track list: 1. "Walk On"; 2. "Down and Gone (The Blue Song)"; 3. "Too Soon"; 4. "Breathe Honestly"; 5. "Don't Cry"; 6. "Night"; 7. "!"; 8. "Memory"; 9. "Untitled"
Stairwells	Released: 23 February 2010; Format: CD, digital download	Track list: 1. "In Your Arms"; 2. "Valentine"; 3. "Strong Enough"; 4. "Together"; 5. "The Goldfish Song"; 6. "Heart and Mind"; 7. "Cambridge"; 8. "Stars Falling Down"; 9. "Delicate"; 10. "Message from Your Heart"; 11. "Stay Just a Little"; 12. "Back to Us"; 13. "Mr. Sun"
Stairwells (re-release)	Released: 5 April 2011; Format: CD, digital download	Track list: 1. "World in Front of Me"; 2. "Message from Your Heart"; 3. "Gone"; 4. "Valentine"; 5. "In Your Arms"; 6. "It's Love"; 7. "The One You Say Goodnight To"; 8. "Stars Falling Down"; 9. "Heart and Mind"; 10. "Without Me"; 11. "Delicate"; 12. "The Goldfish Song"; 13. "Mr. Sun"
Stairwells (re-release)	Stairwells (Deluxe Version): Released: 5 April 2011; Format: CD, digital download	Track list: 1. "World in Front of Me"; 2. "Message from Your Heart"; 3. "Gone"; 4. "Valentine"; 5. "In Your Arms"; 6. "It's Love"; 7. "The One You Say Goodnight To"; 8. "Stars Falling Down"; 9. "Heart and Mind"; 10. "Without Me"; 11. "Delicate"; 12. "The Goldfish Song"; 13. "Mr. Sun"; 14. "Together"; 15. "Strong Enough"; 16. "Cambridge"; 17. "Stay Just a Little"; 18. "Back to Us"; 19. "The Sound of Silence" (Simon & Garfunkel cover); 20. "Disturbia" (Rihanna cover); 21. "White Winter Hymnal" (Fleet Foxes cover)
Elements	Released: 6 May 2014; Format: CD, digital download	Track list: 1. "Dear River"; 2. "The Fire"; 3. "My Dear"; 4. "Winter"; 5. "Oh Father"; 6. "Little Worrier"; 7. "Throw It Away"; 8. "Forever Blue"; 9. "Mary Anne"; 10. "Write It in the Sky"; 11. "My Own"; 12. "This Far"
Elements	Elements (deluxe version): Released: 6 May 2014; Format: CD, digital download	Track list: 1. "Dear River"; 2. "The Fire"; 3. "My Dear"; 4. "Winter"; 5. "Oh Father"; 6. "Little Worrier"; 7. "Throw It Away"; 8. "Forever Blue"; 9. "Mary Anne"; 10. "Write It in the Sky"; 11. "My Own"; 12. "This Far"; 13. "Sorry" (Bonus Track); 14. "Home" (Bonus Track; 15. Elements Extended Trailer; Digital Booklet - Elements (Deluxe Version)
In the Waiting	Released: 29 June 2018; Format: CD, digital download	Track list: 1. "When Will I Learn"; 2. "History"; 3. "In the Waiting"; 4. "Birdsong"; 5. "California"; 6. "For Now"; 7. "Lonesome"; 8. "Beth"; 9. "Souvenirs"; 10. "All Along"
It's Hard To Be Human	Released: 12 October 2021; Format: Digital download	Track list: 1. "Future Memories"; 2. "It's Hard to Be Human"; 3. "Love Anyway"; 4. "Quiet"; 5. "I Never Wanted Anything More Than I Wanted You"; 6. "Oh What a Love"; 7. "Crawl"; 8. "Another Way"; 9. "Light"; 10. "Moonsong"

=== Live albums ===
Title	Album details	Track list
The Living Room Sessions	Released: 2011; Format: CD, digital download	Track list: 1. "Rolling in the Deep" (Adele Cover); 2. "The Call" (Regina Spektor Cover); 3. "Timshel" (Mumford & Sons Cover); 4. "Michicant" (Bon Iver Cover); 5. "Use Somebody" (Kings of Leon Cover); 6. "Firework" (Katy Perry Cover); 7. "Flightless Bird, American Mouth" (Iron & Wine Cover); 8. "Heart of Life" (John Mayer Cover); 9. "Just the Way You Are" (Bruno Mars Cover); 10. "Blood Bank" (Bon Iver Cover)

=== Music videos ===
- "Valentine"
- "Message from Your Heart"
- "It's Love"
- "The Goldfish Song" (Stairwells Sessions)
- "The One You Say Goodnight To."
- "In Your Arms"
- "The Way You Are" (ft. David Choi)
- "My Time with You" (ft. David Choi)
- "Without Me"
- "Gone"
- "Dear River"
- "The Fire"

=== Singles ===
- "Message from Your Heart"
- "Valentine"
- "The One You Say Goodnight to"
- "In Your Arms"
- "Gone"
- "Without Me"
- "This Christmas" with Destorm
- "The Fire"
- "Dear River"
