= In Your Arms (Love song from Neighbours) =

Single by Lynne Hamilton
- B-side: "In Your Arms (Love song from Neighbours) with Peter Rice"
- Released: 1989
- Genre: Pop
- Length: 3:20
- Label: Sony Music Australia; Mushroom Records
- Songwriters: Don Battye; Peter Pinne
- Producer: Mike Harvey

Lynne Hamilton singles chronology
"Slowly" (1980)	"In Your Arms (Love song from Neighbours)" (1989)

"In Your Arms (The Love Song from Neighbours)" is a song by Australian singer Lynne Hamilton. The song was used in the Australian soap opera Neighbours and it was written by the show's executive producer Don Battye and his colleague, Peter Pinne, Executive in Charge of Production. The song was released via Mushroom Records in Australia on 7" vinyl.

== Background and release ==
The song was used as a romantic theme on the Australian soap opera Neighbours. It was used in several episodes in 1989, particularly the wedding of Joe Mangel (Mark Little) and Kerry Bishop (Linda Hartley) and during the departure of Henry Ramsay (Craig McLachlan).

The track was written by the show's executive producer Don Battye and his colleague Peter Pinne for Grundy Music. It was produced by Mike Harvey and recorded at Studios 301, in Sydney, Australia. It was released via Mushroom Records in Australia. It was released on 7" vinyl in the United Kingdom via Sony BMG and RCA. It also featured a b-side duet version featuring Hamilton and Peter Rice

== Critical reception ==
John Mangan from The Age gave a negative review of the song because of its genre. He stated that "I can't help thinking Hamilton and the team down at Grundy Music have erred by indulging in the usual slavishly American excesses of cabaret music in this country."

== Track listings ==
- UK 7" single
1. "In Your Arms (The Love Song from 'Neighbours')" – 3:30
2. "In Your Arms (The Love Song from 'Neighbours')" [feat. Peter Rice] – 3:30
