= Mark Davis (producer) =

- Origin: United States
- Occupations: Musician, record producer
- Instrument: Keyboards

Mark Davis is a musician, songwriter, arranger and producer. Some of the hit songs he has produced or written include "The Devil in Mrs. Jones" for Jerry Butler, "Which Way Is Up" for Stargard, "Tailgate" by 21st Creation, "Remember Who You Are" for Sly & the Family Stone, "Let Me Show You" by The Black Flames and more.

== Background ==
During the course of Mark Davis' career, he has been employed by Warner Bros. as a staff producer. He has worked mainly in the funk and soul genres.

== Career ==
Davis was the arranger on the Edwin Starr song "There You Go" which was a hit on the Cash Box R&B Top 70 chart and a Top 100 Singles chart hit in 1973.

Davis produced tracks on the Me 'n Rock 'n Roll Are Here to Stay album for David Ruffin which was released in 1974. He also played keyboards on the album. With Artis Phillips and McKinley Jackson, Davis composed the song "Tailgate" for 21st Creation. The song was a hit on the US Dance chart making it to no.32.

Working with Executive producer Hillery Johnson, Davis produced the Weapons of Peace single, "Just Can't Be That Way (Ruth's Song)" bw "Mighty Hard Man" which was released in 1976. Peaking at no. 102 on the Cash Box singles chart, it also peaked at no. 55 on the Cash Box Top 100 R&B chart.

Davis was the producer for Stargard in the late 70s. He produced the group's hit single "Which Way Is Up". He produced the Peace is Our Weapon, Love is Our Song album for Weapons of Peace which was released in 1978 on Playboy PB 413. It received a positive review in the 9 October issue of Cash Box.

Davis produced Sylvester Stewart, Hamp Banks composition "Remember Who You Are" for Sly & the Family Stone which was released in 1979. He also produced the group's album, Back on the Right Track. "Remember Who You Are" peaked at no. 28 on the week of 10 November on the Cash Box Black Contemporary Top 100 chart. It also got to no. 38 on the Billboard Hot Soul Singles chart.

Davis composed, produced and played on the track "Gone Forever" which appears on Smokey Robinson's 1984 album, Essar.

Davis co-wrote the hit "Let Me Show You" for The Black Flames. It was a hit for the group in 1991 making it to no. 37 on the r&b chart.
