= Lynne Hamilton =

English singer (born 1950)

- Born: 1950 (age 75–76); Lancashire, England
- Occupation: Singer
- Label: Summit Records
- Formerly of: The Desperadoes, The Caravelles

Lynne Hamilton (born 1950) is an English-born singer, notable for her career in Australia, particularly during the 1970s and 1980s having recorded the single "On the Inside", written by Allan Caswell, which was the theme to the television series Prisoner (also known as Prisoner: Cell Block H)

== Early life and career ==
Hamilton was born 1950 in Lancashire, England, the eldest of four children to Reg Hamilton and his wife. Her career as a singer began as a teenager when she joined a backing group The Desperadoes. They appeared on the same bill as acts such as The Rolling Stones, The Who, Freddy and the Dreamers and The Animals. She knew the Beatles personally, having been signed with the same record labels and having been on the same TV shows and at the same parties and social promotional events for the record label for four years. She later had a four-year stint as a singer with The Caravelles, who successfully toured in the UK and across Europe. In 1971, Hamilton moved to Australia where she variously owned and operated a car hire company, lingerie business and restaurants.

In 1979 Hamilton was invited to sing "On the Inside", written by Allan Caswell as the theme tune for Australian soap opera, Prisoner. The song was released as a single in Australia, reaching number 4 in the singles chart and selling in excess of 70,000 and became Australia's largest selling single by a female artist. The song was also released in the United States by Hilltak Records.

Ten years after this initial success, the song was issued in the UK for the first time, to coincide with the series' first broadcast on UK television. It reached number three on UK singles charts. Hamilton performed the song on Top of the Pops.

In 1989, Hamilton released "In Your Arms (Love song from Neighbours)" for the Australian soap opera Neighbours.

== Discography ==
=== Albums ===
Title	Album details	Peak chart positions
Title	Album details	AUS
On the Inside	Released: 1979; Format: LP, cassette; Label: Summit Records Australia (SCD 499–025)	91

=== Singles ===
Year	Title	Peak chart positions			Album
Year	Title	AUS	NZ	UK	Album
1979	"On the Inside"	4	5	3	On the Inside
1980	"Slowly"	-	-	-	Non-album singles
1989	"In Your Arms (Love song from Neighbours)"	-	-	-	Non-album singles
