= Allan Caswell =

Australian musician

- Born: David Allan Caswell; 9 March 1952 (age 74); Chester, England
- Genres: Country
- Occupations: Songwriter; singer; guitarist; author; record producer; journalist; teacher
- Instruments: Vocals, guitar
- Years active: 1966~present

David Allan Caswell (born 9 March 1951), publishing under the pen name Allan Caswell, is an English-Australian songwriter and performer, author, record producer, freelance journalist and teacher. Caswell wrote "On the Inside" (the theme from the television series Prisoner) and recorded by Lynne Hamilton. It was a hit record in Australia and New Zealand in 1979.

In 1983, the single "The Australia's Cup" peaked at number 17 on the Australian charts.

== Biography ==
=== Early years ===
Allan Caswell was born as David Allan Caswell to Harry Caswell (Steve Castle) and his wife Jean in Chester, Cheshire and grew up in North Wales, Berkshire, and South London (Mitcham) before migrating to Australia in 1966. He was educated at Wimbledon County Secondary School and later at South Sydney Boys High School.

== Music career ==
Caswell's songwriting career started in 1973 when Chris Gilbey signed a song he had written with his brother Brian Caswell to Albert Music in Sydney. However, it was 6 years later when Allan Caswell had a song recorded.

In 1979, Caswell wrote "On the Inside", which became the theme for the television series Prisoner and later a major international hit song. The success of "On the Inside" triggered a succession of recordings by stars such as Patti Page, Cilla Black, The Irish Rovers, Max Bygraves, Acker Bilk, Slim Dusty, The Living End, Chad Morgan, Lynne Hamilton, James Blundell, Anne Kirkpatrick, Don Spencer, Graeme Connors, The Delltones, Doug Ashdown and Ricky May.

Caswell won his first Golden Guitar in Tamworth for Best New Talent in 1980.

In September 1983, Caswell released "The Australia's Cup", which peaked at number 17 on the Australian chart. His first and only top 100 single.

In 1995, Caswell was asked by Don Spencer, on behalf of his Australian Children's Music Foundation, to work with children in Juvenile Detention teaching music and songwriting. He has helped set up similar programs in other centres. He also worked with the Foundation in their aim of making music accessible to underprivileged children.

In 2006, Caswell published his first book, "Writing Great Song Lyrics".

In 2014, Caswell announced he had lost a 10-year legal battle with Sony music over similarities between his song "On the Inside" and Alabama's "Christmas in Dixie"; a song from which Alabama are estimated to have earned over $700,000.

In 2016, Caswell celebrated the 50th Anniversary of his arrival in Australia in 1966 with an album called 50 Years in Oz.

In 2019, he released his autobiography My Version Of The Truth and moved to Queensland where he lives with his wife Marian in Varsity Lakes.

In 2020, Caswell released his 20th album, Tequila Amnesia. He also released his third book, Secrets of Stronger Songwriting.

== Discography ==
=== Studio albums ===
List of albums, with selected detail
Title	Details
What Happened to Love?	Released: 1982; Format: LP; Label: Country Man (CML1003)
Handwritten	Released: 1987; Format: LP; Label: EMI (EMX 490059)
Heart Written	Released: 1990; Format: LP, CD, Cassette; Label: True Blue Records (466734 1)
Different Eyes	Released: 1995; Format: CD; Label: Larrikin Records (LRF 380)
Caswell Sings Caswell	Released: 2001; Format: CD; Label: Shoestring Production
Don't Count on It	Released: 2002; Format: CD; Label: Shoestring Production (SR39)
Al's Bar And Grill	Released: 2006; Format: CD; Label: ORIGiN (OR 079)
Rules for Love	Released: 2008; Format: CD; Label: Allan Caswell ()
Behind Bars	Released: 2010; Format: CD, digital download; Label: Allan Caswell ()
Just Kidding	Released: March 2012; Format: CD, DD; Label: Allan Caswell ()
It's a Country Song	Released: 2012; Format: CD, DD; Label: Allan Caswell ()
Sometimes When Lose When You Win	Released: January 2014; Format: CD, DD; Label: Allan Caswell ()
My Version of the Truth	Released: 2015; Format: CD, DD; Label: Shoestring Production (SR111)
50 Years in Oz	Released: July 2016; Format: CD, DD, streaming; Label: Allan Caswell ()
Carpenter Caswell (as Carpenter Caswell)	Released: 10 November 2017; Format: CD, DD, streaming; Label: Carpenter Caswell/WJO (BRR20173)
Mexico	Released: 11 May 2018; Format: CD, DD, streaming; Label: Allan Caswell ()
Tequila Amnesia	Released: 2020; Format: CD, digital download, streaming; Label: Chihuahua Records (KEV9301)

=== Live albums ===
List of albums, with selected detail
Title	Details
Warm January Morning	Released: 1986; Format: Cassette; Label: Allan Caswell Music (ACMe C001); Note: Live at The Tamworth & District Workmen's Club (January 1986)

=== Singles ===
List of singles, with selected chart positions
Year	Title	Peak chart positions	Album
Year	Title	AUS	Album
1979	"Take Me Back to Yesterday (Dedicated to a Decade Without The Beatles)"/"King of the Rodeo"	-	non album singles
1980	"We Used To Call It Heaven"/"First Time in My Life"	-	non album singles
1980	"Sign on the Dotted Line"/"Poor Side of Heaven"	-	non album singles
1981	"One Armed Bandit"/"Loco Friday Night"	-	non album singles
1982	"Used to Be a Gold Song"/"Isn't That Like You"	-	What Happened To Love?
1983	"What Happened to Love?"/"It's Not Such a Bad Idea"	-	What Happened To Love?
1983	"The Australia's Cup"/"Lonelyheart's Waltz"	17	non album single
1984	"Moruroa"/"Beyond the Blues"	-	non album single
1985	"Bulldust"/"Spirit of the Green & Gold" (with Trevor Knight)	-	non album single
1985	"The Garden" (with Australia Too)	27	non album single
1987	"(You Can Be) Somebody's Shadow"/"Black Jack Blues Again"	-	Handwritten
1988	"Have You Read to Your Children Today?"/"This is Gonna Be the One"	-	Handwritten
1988	"Are We Having Fun Yet?"/"Funny Thing About Rainbows" (as Allan Caswell Band)	-	non album single
1989	"You Still Take My Breath Away"/"Bald Is Beautiful"	-	Heart Written
1990	"I'm Gonna Take a Heartbreak"/"Still Crazy Over You"	-	Heart Written
1990	"Proud"/"(I've Got Those) 12 Bar Blues"	-	Heart Written
2006	"A Little Bit of Country in Us All"	-	Al's Bar And Grill
2007	"Strong Enough"	-	non album single
2008	"Rules for Love"	-	Rules for Love
2011	"It's a Country Song"	-	It's a Country Song
2012	"I'm an Aussie Shark"	-	Just Kidding
2012	"Brave Enough to Dream"	-	It's a Country Song
2015	"One Last Muster"	-	My Version of the Truth
2016	"Back When I Was Older" (with Michael Carpenter)	-	Carpenter Caswell
2017	"Life Like It's a Trainwreck" (with Michael Carpenter)	-	Carpenter Caswell
2017	"High Hopes" (with Michael Carpenter)	-	Carpenter Caswell
2017	"Want That Back Again" (with Michael Carpenter featuring Felicity Urquhart)	-	Carpenter Caswell
2018	"The Roses Fall" (with The Weeping Willows)	-	Mexico
2018	"Feeding the Crew"	-	
2019	"Train to Godforsaken"	-	
2019	"Country Copper"	-	Tequila Amnesia
2019	"Bad Politics" (with Damian Cafarella)	-	Tequila Amnesia
2020	"Hard Times and Struggle"	-	Tequila Amnesia
2020	"Bordertown"	-	Tequila Amnesia
2020	"I Do" (with Donna Fisk)	-	Tequila Amnesia
2020	"That Holden Saved My Life"	-	TBA
2020	"Spin" (with Damian Cafarella)	-	TBA

== Awards and nominations ==
=== Country Music Awards of Australia ===
The Country Music Awards of Australia (also known as the Golden Guitar Awards and originally named Australasian Country Music Awards) is an annual awards night held in January during the Tamworth Country Music Festival, in Tamworth, New South Wales, celebrating recording excellence in the Australian country music industry. Caswell has won eight awards (wins only).

Year	Nominee / work	Award	Result
1980	"King of the Rodeo"	New Talent of the year	Won
1981	"One Armed Bandit" (with Brian Caswell)	Song of the Year	Won
1983	"Used to Be a Gold Song" (with Keith Potger)	Song of the Year	Won
1986	"The Garden"	Song of the Year	Won
1988	"Black Jack Blues Again"	Male Vocalist of the Year	Won
2007	"A Little Bit of Country in Us All" (with Drew McAlister)	Vocal Collaboration of the Year	Won
2016	"One Last Muster"	Bush Ballad of the Year	Won
2020	"Country Copper"	Bush Ballad of the Year	Won

=== Tamworth Songwriters Awards ===
The Tamworth Songwriters Association (TSA) is an annual songwriting contest for original country songs, awarded in January at the Tamworth Country Music Festival. They commenced in 1986. Allan Caswell has won sixteen awards.

Year	Nominee / work	Award	Result (wins only)
1988	"Black Jack Blues Again" by Allan Caswell	Contemporary Song of the Year	Won
1988	"When We Were Kids" by John Williamson and Allan Caswell	Country Song of the Year	Won
1989	Allan Caswell	Contemporary Song of the Year	Won
1990	"You Still Take My Breath Away" by Allan Caswell	Contemporary Song of the Year	Won
1990	"You Still Take My Breath Away" by Allan Caswell	Country Song of the Year	Won
1991	"Panda" by Allan Caswell and Don Morrison	Children's Song of the Year	Won
1991	"Proud" by Allan Caswell	Contemporary Song of the Year	Won
2011	"Behind Bars" by Allan Caswell	Country Song of the Year	Won
2011	"Behind Bars" by Allan Caswell	Contemporary Song of the Year	Won
2012	"The Road That Brought Me Here" by Karen Lynne and Allan Caswell	Contemporary Song of the Year	Won
2013	"Skin" by Allan Caswell	Comedy/ Novelty Song of the Year	Won
2017	"Golden Days" by Andrew Wriggleswroth and Allan Caswell	Contemporary Song of the Year	Won
2017	"Golden Days" by Andrew Wriggleswroth and Allan Caswell	Country Song of the Year	Won
2017	"Back When I Was Older" by Andrew Wriggleswroth and Allan Caswell	Contemporary Song of the Year	Won
2019	"The Roses Fall" by Andrew Wriggleswroth and Allan Caswell	Country Ballad of the Year	Won
2022	"Youngie" by Allan Caswell	Local Heroes Song of the Year	Won
