= 9th Creation =

1970s R&B, funk band

- Also known as: 3rd Creation, Ninth Creation
- Origin: Stockton, California
- Genres: R&B, funk
- Years active: 1970 to 1980s
- Labels: Clarama Records, Ritetrack Record Co., Prelude Records, Hilltak, Past Due
- Spinoff of: Soul Struts
- Past members: Don Ray Allen; Henry Anadon; W. Thad Bourland; A. D. Burrise; J. D Burrise; Robert E. Clarke; Laurence Holman; Jimmy Jones; Mike Micenheimer; Steven Rubio

9th Creation was a 1970s R&B, funk band who had chart hits with "Why Not Today" and "Let's Dance". Other songs, such as "Falling in Love" made the charts. They recorded for a variety of labels including PYE/ATV, Prelude and Hilltak etc..

== Background ==
The group's origins go back to Stockton, California when they started out as the Soul Struts. They were formed by bass guitarist A.D. Burrise in 1970. In 1971, his brother J.D Burris came on board. At 6'4" tall, he was an imposing frontman. According to the FUNKMYSOUL.GR website, they had a hit with their first record, "Still Your Friend" which got into the Billboard top 25. They had more success with "Falling In Love" which made the Billboard r&b top 10. They also did well with "Let's Dance".

After appearing on Soul Train in 1975, they did a tour North America and Japan on a few occasions. They also bill with James Brown, Con Funk Shun, The Main Ingredient, The Sylvers, Irma Thomas and The Whispers.

They are #40 on the Bygonely "Drugs, Nudes, Letters, And Weird Things: Vinyl Collector Reveals Secret Stuff That People Hide Inside Vinyl Sleeves" list for weird things found inside record covers. A cardboard cutout record and an article, both about the Assassination of John F. Kennedy were found inside their Falling In Love record sleeve.

== Career ==
=== 1970s ===
With J. D. Burrise now on board and fronting the group, he convinced his brother A. D. to change the name of the group to 3rd Creation. They ended up on Bill Withers' Sussex Records roster. Due to there being another band with the name 3rd Creation, they changed their name to 9th Creation.

In 1974, they had a 45 issued on the Clarama label, "Skin It Back" bw "I'm Still Your Friend". Their first album Bubble Gum was released in 1975.

They appeared on the January 25, 1975 episode of Soul Train performing "Sexy Girl" and "Falling in Love".

In 1976, "Falling In Love" was released in the US on Pye PYE 71069. It was charting in the Cash Box Top 100 R&B Chart and the band was listed as Ninth Creation. By October 23, with nine weeks behind it, the single had moved up five notches to #54.

In February, 1977, it was reported by Billboard that 9th Creation and other artists who had their music issued on PYE/ATV shortly before the company closed down would have their releases on Prelude Records. The new label had recently been formed by Marvin Schlachter who was the former head of PYE/ATV. In March that year, their single "Why Not Today" was released. It was produced by Buddy Scott and released on Prelude 71085. Running at 4:45, it had been getting play on J. D. Black's show at KOKY in Little Rock and Calvin John's show at WDDO in Macon. Eventually the record made it to the Billboard Soul chart. It held the #98 position in the Hot Soul Singles Chart for two weeks. It did better in the Record World R&B Singles chart, debuting at #67 on June 4. It got to #63 on the 18th at its third week.

In December 1979, the group's single, "Let's Dance", had moved up two notches from #72 to 70 on the Record World Black Oriented Singles Chart. Also that month it peaked at number 53 on the Cash Box R&B chart. It also peaked at #54 on December 1 on its third week in the Billboard Hot Soul Singles Chart.

=== 1980s ===
In January 1980, "Let's Dance" was still in the Record World Black Oriented Singles Chart, peaking at #47 on the 19th, having spent a total of seven weeks in the chart. This was their last single for the Hilltak label.

Also in 1980, the group ended up in a difficult situation. They had recorded tracks at a studio east of Stockton. Unknown to the group, the owners were drug dealers. The studio was raided and the DEA confiscated the master tapes. In an attempt to get them back, J.D. Burrise sued the DEA but had no success.

== Later years ==
J. D. Burrise died on May 27, 2016, at age 67. A service was held for him on June 19.

Due to Mike Micenheimer saving some of the mixdowns to cassette, an album which was deemed to be lost as a result of the DEA raid on a studio in 1980, A Step Ahead was released by Past Due Records on 30 April 2019. Due to the format the album was mastered from, there were some audio imperfections present.

Some of their albums including Superheroes have been re-released on the Past Due record label.
