= Playboy Records =

Defunct American record label

- Parent company: Playboy Enterprises
- Founded: 1949
- Defunct: 1978
- Country of origin: United States
- Location: Los Angeles, California

Playboy Records was an American record label, based in Los Angeles, California, and a unit of Playboy Enterprises. Artists recording for the label included Al Wilson, Barbi Benton, Blue Ash, Bobby Taylor & the Vancouvers, The Weapons of Peace, Brenda Patterson, Lois Fletcher, Jeanne French, Hamilton, Joe Frank & Reynolds, Ivory, Greg Kihn, The Rubinoos, Wynn Stewart, Mickey Gilley and Joey Stec.

A notable LP was Hudson, the first album by the Hudson Brothers. Another notable artist is Jim Sullivan, whose second album (self titled) was released on Playboy. Playboy also issued on LP the only full-length live concert recording by Lead Belly from a recording made in 1949, shortly before his death.

Playboy Records was also home to the early 1972-1973 U.S. single releases by soon-to-be international superstars ABBA, licensed to the label by their Swedish label, Polar Music. Polar/ABBA manager Stig Anderson blamed the lack of greater U.S. success of their first single, "People Need Love", on the limited distribution resources of the label, as they were unable to meet the demand from retailers and radio programmers, and Polar changed distributors when ABBA won Eurovision in 1974, to Atlantic Records.

The label's biggest hit was Hamilton, Joe Frank & Reynolds' million-seller, "Fallin' in Love", which topped the Billboard Hot 100 in 1975 (also reaching #24, R&B). Al Wilson also had a major hit for the label in 1976 when "I've Got a Feeling" reached #3 on the R&B chart (#29 pop).

In addition to its own material, Playboy also acted as the distributor for the Beserkley Records label, which predominantly released music by power pop acts such as The Modern Lovers and The Greg Kihn Band.

The label was originally independently distributed and towards the end of its life, CBS Records took over distribution. The original incarnation of the label folded in 1978, after which Elektra Records took over the distribution of Beserkley titles until that label dissolved in 1984.

The label was relaunched in 2001 as a jazz imprint distributed by Concord Records. Sony Music's Legacy Recordings handles Playboy Records catalog from the 1970s.

== Staff ==
=== Tom Takayoshi ===
In the 1970s, Tom Takayoshi joined Playboy Records. In early 1973, he was named marketing director of sales and promotion. Around 1974, he was executive vice-president for the label. While in that role he signed country singer Eddie Weaver to the label. Later, he was the man in charge of the label, the third man in that position in three years. Under his stewardship, Playboy Records did well with country singer Mickey Gilley.

== See also ==
- List of record labels
