= Hillery Johnson =

Hillery Johnsomn
- Genres: Jazz, Soul music
- Occupations: Record producer, Record executive
- Years active: 1960s - 2000s
- Labels: Brainstorm Records; Twin Stacks Records; Hilltak Records; Valley Vue Records

Hillery Johnson was a record label owner, record producer, manager and songwriter and vice-president of a major record American record label.

== Background ==
In 1966, Hillery Johnson along with Leo Austell and Archie Russell founded Brainstorm Records and Productions. Later he worked for United Artists and then Capitol Records. By 1973 he was working for MCA Records where he held the position of promotional manager for special marketing. By the mid-1970s he was with Playboy Records as their national r&b promotion director. By 1977 he was vice-president of Atlantic Records.

As a composer, along with Michael Wycoff he co-composed "Try Love Again" for The Manhattans.

In 1993, Johnson was involved in legal action against Joseph Jack Productions. He was suing the production company and its owner Joseph Jackson over money he alleged was owed to him for negotiating a recording agreement. He claimed he was owed $15,000 for representing Jackson in an attempt to work out an A&M recording deal for Janet Jackson.

== Labels founded ==
In 1966, as a young man, Johnson and Archie Russell along with Leo Austell, a veteran in the record scene co-founded Brainstorm Records. This came about as a result of the label Austell was with, Vee Jay records collapsing. Another label creation that Johnson responsible for was Twin Stacks. It was the subsidiary of Brainstorm. Both labels lasted for four years and were successful mainly in their geographical region. They did however have some real solid success. As a production company they did extremely well with Betty Everett scoring several national hits including "There'll Come A Time".

He founded the Palm Springs based label Valley Vue Records Another label he started was one he co-founded along with Tom Takayoshi, was Hilltak Records. Takayoshi was the former president of Playboy Records. The Hilltak label was a subsidiary of Atlantic Records.

Johnson and Willie Henderson put together the disco group, Broadway. The group had four female singers, with the lead singer was Patti Williams. They were signed to the Hilltak label.

== Acts ==
Johnson introduced the Temptations to a party crowd of 500 that included Bette Midler and Teddy Pendergrass at Studio 54 in Manhattan in May 1977. The party was to announce the Temptations leaving Motown for Atlantic. Some of the acts Johnson has managed include Rene & Angela and Lalah Hathaway.
