= If You Can't Be My Woman =

Song by Boones Farm

from the album Boones Farm
- B-side: "Start Today"
- Released: 1972
- Length: 3:00
- Label: Columbia 4-45623
- Songwriters: G. Stovall, K. Sprague
- Producer: Jim Messina

Boones Farm singles chronology
| "If You Can't Be My Woman" (1972) | "Good Old Feelin'" (1972) |

"If You Can't Be My Woman" was a chart hit for country-rock band, Boones Farm, charting for two weeks in 1972. It has also been recorded by female artists as "If I Can't Be Your Woman".

== Background ==
Written by Gary Dalton and Kent Sprague a.k.a. Gary Dalton and Kent Dubarri, the single, "If You Can't Be My Woman" backed with "Start Today" was produced by Jim Messina and released on Columbia 4–45623 in May / June 1972. The June 3 issue of Billboard had it in the New Radio Action and Billboard Single Pick. Cash Box were also picking it as a hit in their June, 3 issue. It was also a Record World Single Pick in the June 17 edition. The reviewer noted the soft harmonic vocals and acoustic guitar strumming, and gave a suggestion for the listener to "Get into it".

== Airplay and charting ==
Along with singles, "Motorcycle Mama" by Sailcat, "You Don't Mess Around With Jim" by Jim Croce and "Beautiful Sunday" by Daniel Boone, Boones Farm's single "If You Can't Be My Woman" was active on the Top 40 station KLEO Wichita play list for the week of July 8. On July 15, it was still on KLEO's play list. It was on the WIXY-Cleveland play list by July 22. By July 29, it was on the WMEX-Boston play list. It was also charting and at #124 in the Cash Box Looking Ahead Chart, just behind "Baby I'm For Real" by Esther Phillips. On its second week it was at #114.

=== Charts ===
| Chart (1972) | Peak position |
|---|---|
| Looking Ahead Chart (Cash Box) | 114 |

== Other versions ==
Lynn Anderson recorded the song which was released in 1972 as "If I Can't Be Your Woman". The song also appeared on the 1975 Across the Water album by Vicky Leandros. Betty LaVette also recorded her version of "If I Can't Be Your Woman" that was released in 2000. Ricky Koole recorded a Dutch version with some changes. It was released as "Niets meer voor mij" in 2011.
