= Psychotic Reactions and Carburetor Dung (essay) =

"Psychotic Reactions and Carburetor Dung" was a 1971 essay by Lester Bangs, later collected in a book of the same name (ISBN 0-679-72045-6). The essay, which talks about what is today called garage rock, contains the phrase, "...punk bands started cropping up who were writing their own songs but taking the Yardbirds' sound." This is believed to be one of the first uses of the word "punk" to refer to a type of rock music. A large section of the essay is concerned with the imagined longer career of the garage band the Count Five, after their hit "Psychotic Reaction". The band split after one album, but Bangs' discussion of the imagined subsequent records is entirely fanciful.
