= Boones Farm =

American country rock band

- Origin: California, United States
- Genres: Country rock, blues
- Years active: 1972
- Label: Columbia
- Spinoffs: Dalton & Dubarri
- Spinoff of: Churchill Downs
- Past members: Fred Darling; Brad Palmer; Kent Sprague; Gary Stovall

Boones Farm were an early 1970s country rock band who were signed to the Columbia label. Releasing an album and two singles, they had some chart success with the song "If You Can't Be My Woman". Two of the group's members would later become the Dalton & Dubarri duo.

== Background ==
The history goes back to an Idaho band, Churchill Downs, which included Fred Darling and guitarist Gary Stovall in their line up. Finishing school, Darling and Stovall moved to Southern California. There they were doing reasonably well playing in Los Angeles clubs during the late 1960s. This ended when Darling was drafted into the army. Darling returned to Los Angeles in 1971, having done his time in the army. Stovall had put together a group and invited Darling to join. The group became the quartet, Boones Farm featuring Kent Sprague on vocals, Darling on drums, Stovall on guitar, and bassist Brad Palmer. Columbia Records eventually got wind of this group and signed them up. They had some chart success with their composition, "If You Can't Be My Woman" which was produced by Jim Messina.

Their booking in 1972 was handled by Associated Booking Corp which was located on 445 Park Ave, New York.

At some stage they took on board ex-Chase drummer, Jay Mitthauer.

== Career ==
By June 3, 1972, their self-titled album Boones Farm had been released on Columbia KC 31408. With the Billboard reviewer calling it modified country-blues rock, it was described as a flawless production by Jim Messina. The reviewer also said that the total feel was exhilarating and enlivening, with the song picks being, "The Me Nobody Knows", "Livin' Together" and "Good Ole Feelin'". The musicians who played on the album were, Kent Sprague on vocals and percussion, Gary Stovall on vocals, acoustic and electric guitars, Brad Palmer on vocals, bass and acoustic guitar, Fred Darling on drums, and Milt Holland on percussion.

=== "If You Can't Be My Woman" ===
The single, "If You Can't Be My Woman" was a Record World Single Pick in the June 17 edition. The reviewer noted the soft harmonic vocals and acoustic guitar strumming with the instruction for the listener to "Get into it". Along with "Motorcycle Mama" by Sailcat, "You Don't Mess Around With Jim" by Jim Croce and "Beautiful Sunday" by Daniel Boone, their song, "If You Can't Be My Woman" was on the Top 40 station KLEO Wichita play list for the week of July 8. On July 15, it was still on KLEO's play list. It was on the WIXY-Cleveland play list by July 22. By July 29, it was on the WMEX-Boston play list. It was also charting and at #124 in the Cash Box Looking Ahead Chart, just behind "Baby I'm For Real" by Esther Phillips. The following week it was at #114.

=== Further activities ===
It was reported by Record World in the September 9 issue that the group were looking for a new manager. They had also got the attention of wine manufacturing heir David Gallo over the use of the name, Boones Farm. He was considering taking legal action against the group.

Along with Black Oak Arkansas, the Eagles, The Chambers Brothers etc., they played at the Erie Canal Soda Pop Festival which was held on Bull Island, Indiana on labor Day in September. The concert had between 200,000 and 300,000 attendees.

They appeared at the KGB-AM sponsored concert at San Diego Stadium on November 12 which also had the J. Geils Band, Foghat, Jesse Colin Young and Quicksilver lined up. The event was attended by a record crowd of 51,778.

On March 5, 1973, they were set to play at the Lakeland College campus in Wisconsin. At that time the line up consisted of Gary Stovall, Brad Palmer, Kent Sprague and Jay Mitthauer.

== Later years ==
After Boones Farm broke up, Gary Stovall aka Gary Dalton and Kent Sprague aka Kent Dubarri formed the duo Dalton & Dubarri in 1973, releasing four albums and having a hit with "I Can Dance All By Myself".

== Discography ==
Singles
Act	Release	Catalogue	Year	Notes
Boones Farm	"If You Can't Be My Woman" / "Start Today"	Columbia 4-45623	1972	
Boones Farm	" Good Old Feelin'" / "Start Today"	Columbia 4-45713	1972	

Album
Act	Release	Catalogue	Year	Notes
Boones Farm	Boones Farm	Columbia KC 31408	1972	

== Musicians ==
- Gary Stovall - vocals, acoustic and electric guitars
- Brad Palmer - vocals, bass and acoustic guitar
- Fred Darling - drums
- Kent Sprague - vocals and percussion
- Milt Holland - percussion
- Jay Mitthauer - Drums

== Links ==
- Discogs: Boones Farm
- Joe Bonamassa, Topic: Boone's Farm
- OoCities.org: BadCat Records - Boones Farm
