= Kent Sprague =

American musician

Kent Spraque
- Also known as: Kent DuBarri, Kent Dubarri, Butch Dubarri
- Origin: Illinois
- Genres: Rock, country, soul
- Occupations: Musician, composer
- Instruments: Drums, percussion, vocals
- Formerly of: Kent and The Candidates, Boones Farm, Dalton & Dubarri

Kent Sprague aka Butch Dubarri is an American singer, drummer and composer. During the 1960s, his band Kent & the Candidates backed Brenton Wood, playing on two of the singer's hits. He was also a member of Boones Farm in the early 1970s and later one half of the duo Dalton & Dubarri who had a hit with "I (You) Can Dance All By My (Your) Self" and "'Til the Day I Started Lovin' You".

== Background ==
Kent Sprague aka Butch Dubarri is The fifth of eight children. He was born and raised in Quincy to black parents, William E. and Esther Sprague, but has a mixed background. His grandfather was William Sprague, a white man. He graduated from Quincy High School in 1961 and for some years worked with his brothers at Midwest Paper Products.

In later years he set out on a quest to find out more about his background and history. Having remembered his days in Quincy High School and the fact that there were both white and black kids with the Sprague name, he attempted to find out more about his grandfather and family connections. He was discouraged by his brothers and sisters from doing so and had no cooperation from other people with the same last name.

The Baptist choir was Sprague's first introduction to music. At the age 14 he formed his first real band. They played around many of the local venues. He also started writing and composing his own music. He went info the army for three years. After his time was done he re-started his group and they eventually made their way via the classic route to Hollywood, California.

== Career ==
=== Double Shot Records, Whiz Records period ===
Kent & the Candidates

Sprague signed up with the Double Shot label and worked as musical director for Brenton Wood. With Wood, they had two big hits and toured around the country. In addition to backing Wood, Kent & the Candidates also recorded several singles for the Double Shot label, including "Trouble", which was released in August 1967, at the same time as Brenton Wood's song "Gimme Little Sign" was released.

Whiz Records

Whiz Records was the subsidiary of Double Shot. The label was supervised by independent producers Hal Winn, Joe Hooven and promoter Irwin Zucker. The supervision was done from the Double Shot head office. As of November 1967, singer Pat Briley had a pending release with "One for My Baby", and new group Grapevine had been signed up. Sprague wrote the song, "Ace in the Hole", which was the B side for the single "Things Ain't What They Used To Be Anymore" by The Grapevine, issued on Whiz 602 in 1968. It was also issued on Liberty LBF 15063 in the UK. He also wrote the song, "You Care For Me" which was the B side for the single, "They Put The Last Clean Shirt On Leroy Jones Today" by Shirley, released on Whiz 610 in 1969. Billboard had the single as an R&B Chart prediction in the March 15 issue. He had a hand in composing both sides of the single, "It Took A Little Church Girl" / "The International Love Song", released on Whiz 613 in 1969.

=== 1960s to 1980s ===
Big Mouth / Stu Gardner, Southern Fried

Both Sprague and Gary Stovall played and contributed vocals on the Big Mouth album by Big Mouth featuring Stu Gardner which was produced by David Briggs and released on Spindizzy Records Z 31024 in 1971. Sprague also composed the song on Side 2, "Wake Up Little Girl".

The Southern Fried album, A Little Taste of Southern Fried was reviewed in the April 10, 1971, issue of Record World with the reviewer writing "These people don't hold back when they find a note to wail" and complementing them on being themselves. Sprague played drums and added his backing vocals. It was produced by Bob Todd and Hal Winn.

Boones Farm

In 1972, he and Gary Stovall were members of Boones Farm. Stovall additionally played guitar and sang in the rock band Churchill Downs, in 1967 and 1968. With bandmate Stovall, he co-wrote "If You Can't Be My Woman" which was produced by Jim Messina. The song got to be a minor hit for the group entering the Cash Box Looking Ahead Chart at #124 just behind "Baby I'm For Real" by Esther Phillips. The following week it was at #114. Even though Sprague was a good drummer, and as Bill King said in his "The Colour of Music On The Bandstand" article, his drumming was groove perfection. Sprague was on vocals and percussion while the drumming chores were left to Fred Darling and then later Jay Mitthauer.

Boone's Farm had made an obvious impression as their work as of early 1973 was being recorded by major artists in the pop, rock and even country and western musical genres.

Dalton & Dubarri

Both Kent Dubarri and Gary Stovall Dalton became Dalton & Dubarri. They launched themselves on the music scene with their New York debut was at Madison Square Gardens and their Columbia sponsored Los Angeles debut at the Troubadour.

The act's first two albums were the self-titled Dalton & Dubarri (1973) and Good Head (1974), both released on Columbia. With Gary Dalton, he co-wrote and co-produced the disco song, "I (You) Can Dance All By My (Your) Self". Released in 1979, the song became a hit and stayed on the Radio Report MS Survey Chart for four weeks from May 24 to June 14, three of them spent at #138. It also spent five weeks on the Cash Box Top 100 chart from June 2 to June 30 getting to #73. It also got on the Record World Singles 105-150 chart getting to #123 on June 23.

Another song the duo composed, "'Til the Day I Started Lovin' You" got to #76 on the R&B Charts.

=== 1990s to 2000s ===
Dubarri got together with Alonzo Freeman and as Twoché recorded the 2007 album Confusion which included the songs "Confusion" and "The Color of Money". They also recorded another album, released in 2010, Touch which included the songs, "Where Does America Live", "Do Me Right" and "Stop in the Name of Love"

He wrote the musical play E.D. Blues: The Musical which starred Eloise Laws, and headlined at the El Portal Mainstage Theatre in North Hollywood on June 16, 17th and June 18, 2017. He was also co-director of the adult-oriented play.

== Links ==
- Discogs: Kent Dubarri
- Discogs: Kent Sprague
- bbggmusic
- Pink Lady Presents YouTube channel - Butch Dubarri
