= Erik Jensen (actor) =

American actor and playwright

- Born: July 20, 1970 (age 56); Detroit Lakes, Minnesota, U.S.
- Education: Carnegie Mellon University (BFA)
- Occupations: Actor; playwright; screenwriter; director
- Years active: 1991–present
- Spouse: Jessica Blank (m. 2001)

Erik Jensen (born July 20, 1970) is an American actor, playwright, screenwriter, and director.

== Early life ==
Jensen was born and raised in Detroit Lakes, Minnesota. He graduated from Apple Valley High School in Minnesota in 1988. He earned a Bachelor of Fine Arts in acting from Carnegie Mellon University.

== Career ==
An actor, writer, and director, Erik Jensen regularly appears on the ABC Network Television series For Life as ADA Dez O'Reilly. Notably, he appeared as Thurman Munson of the New York Yankees in the ESPN miniseries The Bronx Is Burning, and as conspiracy talk show host Frank Cody in Mr. Robot, as well as Dr. Stephen Edwards on The Walking Dead. Jensen appeared alongside Aasif Mandvi in Ayad Akhtars' Disgraced at Lincoln Center. He also appeared as rock critic Lester Bangs in the one-man play How to Be a Rock Critic (based on the writings of Lester Bangs) which he co-wrote with his wife Jessica Blank. How to Be A Rock Critic received a completion commission from Center Theatre Group and was produced at the Kirk Douglas Theater, ArtsEmerson, and Steppenwolf Theatre Company before being produced Off-Broadway at The Public Theater.

In 2017 he co-directed the film Almost Home with Jessica Blank based on her novel of the same name.

In 2020, Jensen and Blank's co-written plays, Coal Country and The Line, both premiered at The Public Theater.

In 2022/2023, Jensen appeared on Broadway as Bruno Bischofberger opposite Paul Bettany and Jeremy Pope in Anthony McCarten's 'The Collaboration'.

Jensen and Blank have cited the works of Anna Deavere Smith, Emily Mann, and Studs Terkel as influences.

=== The Exonerated ===
Blank and Jensen co-wrote The Exonerated, a play based on interviews they conducted with more than 40 exonerated death row inmates. In spring 2002, they co-directed The Exonerated at The Actors' Gang Theater. That production was nominated for five Ovation Awards and three NAACP Awards, won the Ovation for Best World Premiere Play, and has toured universities nationally. The New York production of The Exonerated ran for more than 600 performances off-Broadway, toured nationally, and won the Outer Critics Circle, Lortel, and Drama Desk awards, as well as awards from Amnesty International, American Bar Association, National Council of Criminal Defense Lawyers and more. It was adapted as a movie for Court TV starring Brian Dennehy, Danny Glover, Delroy Lindo, Aidan Quinn, and Susan Sarandon. The play has been produced internationally in Dublin, Edinburgh, and London, in the United Kingdom; and in Japan, Mexico, France, China, Thailand, Iran, and Italy. It has been translated into French, Spanish, Italian, Mandarin, and Japanese.

=== Aftermath ===
Blank and Jensen co-wrote the documentary play Aftermath based on interviews they conducted in 2008 with Iraqi civilian refugees in Jordan. Blank directed Aftermath Off-Broadway at New York Theatre Workshop; it was nominated for two Drama League awards and toured internationally for two years.

=== Almost Home ===
Jensen and Blank co-wrote and co-directed the feature film Almost Home in 2016, adapted from the novel Almost Home written by Jessica Blank, published in October 2007 by Hyperion.

=== How to Be A Rock Critic ===
Their play, How To Be A Rock Critic (based on the writings of Lester Bangs), received a commission from Center Theatre Group and was produced at the Kirk Douglas Theater, South Coast Repertory, ArtsEmerson, Steppenwolf Theatre Company, and Off-Broadway at The Public Theater, with Jensen starring and Blank directing.

=== Coal Country ===
Jensen and Blank's documentary play, Coal Country, about the 2010 Upper Big Branch Mine disaster, opened at The Public Theater on March 3, 2020, directed by Jessica Blank, with original music written and performed by Grammy Award-winning musician Steve Earle. Coal Country was suspended when theaters closed down March 11, 2020 due to the COVID-19 pandemic. The play is a recipient of the Edgerton Foundation New Play Award, and was nominated for the Drama Desk award for Outstanding Director (Jessica Blank) and Outstanding Music in a Play (Steve Earle).

=== The Line ===
Blank and Jensen wrote The Line in 2020, which tells the story about New York City health-care workers fighting against COVID-19. The one-hour documentary-style production was directed by Blank, produced and presented by The Public Theater, and streamed on YouTube from July 8 through September 1, 2020.

=== Living Justice ===
Blank and Jensen's book Living Justice (2005), a memoir about the making of The Exonerated, was published by Simon and Schuster and received a Kirkus Starred Review.

=== The Reconcilers ===
Erik’s sci-fi graphic novel The Reconcilers was published in 2010 by Viking Warrior Press.

== Personal life ==
Jensen married writer, director and actress Jessica Blank in 2001. They are based in Brooklyn, New York. They have a daughter, Sadie, who plays the lead in an independent film they made in 2023, Rebel Girl.

Jensen was diagnosed with stage IV colorectal cancer in October 2023, which also metastasized to his liver. He underwent chemotherapy and surgery to remove the tumors, while continuing to work full-time as a writer and director. The cancer responded well to treatment, and by October 2024, Jensen's doctors found no further evidence of disease. Jensen also survived a brain aneurysm in 2021.

== Filmography ==
=== Film ===
- 1991: Dead and Alive: The Race for Gus Farace as Boat Owner
- 1992: What She Doesn't Know as Thug
- 1993: The Dark Half as Male Student
- 1993: Striking Distance as Kid on Steps
- 1995: A Horse for Danny as Mooner
- 1995: Inflammable as Roland Fantaine
- 1996: Ripe as Dave
- 1996: Twisted as Man Who Kills Can Man
- 1997: Colin Fitz Lives! as Dean
- 1997: Julian Po as Tyler
- 1997: Arresting Gena as Stevie
- 1998: Anima
- 1998: Montana as Earl
- 1998: Above Freezing as Richie
- 1999: The Love Letter as Ray
- 1999: Cherry as Man #3
- 2000: Brooklyn Sonnet as Frankie the Snake
- 2000: Book of Shadows: Blair Witch 2 as Stoner #2
- 2001: Black Knight as Derek
- 2002: The Year That Trembled as Todd Franklin
- 2002: Heartbreak Hospital as HH Producer
- 2003: Undermind as Ian Waye
- 2004: Messengers as David Richards
- 2005: The Exonerated as Jeff
- 2005: Hitler, Stalin & Walter O'Malley as Jules (short film)
- 2005: The Naked Brothers Band: The Movie as Photographer
- 2006: The House Is Burning as Carl
- 2006: 5up 2down as Ewan
- 2007: Serial as Gary Whitlock
- 2007: Game of Life as Larry
- 2008: Quality Time as Tucker (short film)
- 2008: The Sisterhood of the Traveling Pants 2 as Video Store Manager Phil
- 2009: Speed Grieving as Scott (voice) (short film)
- 2009: Stream as Marco (short film)
- 2009: Virtuality as Dr. Jules Braun
- 2011: The Loop as Bearded Man
- 2011: Gun Hill as Tommy Griffin
- 2012: The Frontier as Doctor Strong
- 2013: Second Sight as Daniel Bashevis
- 2017: Police State as Beat Cop Swanson
- 2018: Almost Home (co-writer and co-director with Jessica Blank)
- 2018: After Everything as Jeff
- 2020: What Breaks the Ice as Sherriff McClain
- 2024: Brooklyn, Minnesota as Kurt (co-director with Jessica Blank and co-writer with Blank and Han Shan)
- 2025: Tow as Mike Patterson

=== Television ===
- 1994: Law & Order as George Harding (1 episode - "Coma")
- 1995: Central Park West as Jeffrey (1 episode - "Lunar Eclipse")
- 1996: Swift Justice as Mutrix (1 episode - "Pilot")
- 1997: Dellaventura (1 episode - "Hell's Kitchen")
- 1998: Law & Order as Joey Springfield (1 episode - "Greif")
- 1998: The Last Don II as Frankie Lips (miniseries)
- 2000–2001: Deadline as Feldman (3 episodes)
- 2002: Third Watch as Larry (1 episode - "Transformed")
- 2003–2007: CSI: Crime Scene Investigation as A.D.A. Jeffrey Sinclair (7 episodes)
- 2004: Strong Medicine as Gaby's Father (1 episode - "The Real World Rittenhouse")
- 2004: Alias as Philip Terrance (1 episode - "Blood Ties")
- 2004: Century City as Randolph Clemens (1 episode - "The Face Was Familiar")
- 2005: Rescue Me as Ringmaster (1 episode - "Happy")
- 2006: Love Monkey as Jeff (8 episodes)
- 2007: The Bronx Is Burning as Thurman Munson (8 episodes)
- 2007: Law & Order: Criminal Intent as Boyd (1 episode - "Renewal")
- 2008: New Amsterdam as Durst (1 episode - "Honor")
- 2009: The Good Wife as Josh Baldwin (1 episode - "Conjugal")
- 2010: Past Life as Patrick (1 episode - "Regressing Henry")
- 2010: Gravity as Ralph (6 episodes)
- 2010: Law & Order: Criminal Intent as Richard Celeste (1 episode - "Palimsest")
- 2010: Drop Dead Diva as Mr. Trilling (1 episode - "A Mother's Secret")
- 2011: Lie to Me as Wayne (1 episode - "Funhouse")
- 2011: NCIS: Los Angeles as FBI Agent Landon Frisbee (1 episode - "Archangel")
- 2011: Leverage as John Connell (1 episode - "The Carnival Job")
- 2011: It's Always Sunny in Philadelphia as Walter Harris (1 episode - "Frank Reynolds' Little Beauties")
- 2011: Unforgettable as Jim Clayburn (1 episode - "Trajectories")
- 2012: 30 Rock as Cjokula (2 episodes - "Hey, Baby, What's Wrong" Parts 1 & 2)
- 2013: The Americans as Fred (1 episode - "Cardinal")
- 2013: Elementary as Isaac Proctor (1 episode - "The Woman")
- 2013: Castle as Professor Jason Byford (1 episode - "Get a Clue")
- 2013: The Mentalist as Bran McTavish (1 episode - "Behind the Red Curtain")
- 2014: Blue Bloods as Jimmy (1 episode - "The Bogeyman")
- 2014: The Walking Dead as Dr. Steven Edwards (3 episodes)
- 2014: Person of Interest as Walter Dang (1 episode - "Pretenders")
- 2014: The Americans as Bruce Dameran (1 episode - "The Walk In")
- 2014: Major Crimes as Chris O'Hara (1 episode - "Leap of Faith")
- 2015: The Blacklist as Francis King (1 episode - "T. Earl King VI (No. 94)")
- 2015: Turn: Washington's Spies as Bill Shanks (1 episode - "Sealed Fate")
- 2016–2017: Mr. Robot as Frank Cody (8 episodes)
- 2016: Chicago P.D. as Martin Watts (1 episode - "Hit Me")
- 2016: High Maintenance as Derek (1 episode - "Tick")
- 2018: Law & Order: Special Victims Unit as James Turner (1 episode - "Send in the Clowns")
- 2018: Quantico as Damon Grosch (1 episode - "Fear and Flesh")
- 2019: Modern Love as Darren (1 episode - "When Cupid is a Prying Journalist")
- 2019: Mindhunter as Dr. Moritz (3 episodes)
- 2020–2021: For Life as Dez O'Reilly (13 episodes)
- 2021: The Equalizer as Abe Watkins (1 episode - "Followers")
- 2025: Doc as Ned Lenczyk (1 episode - "Once More, With Feeling")

=== Stage ===
- The Exonerated (writer; co-wrote with Jessica Blank)
- Coal Country (writer; co-wrote with Jessica Blank) Public Theater
- How to Be a Rock Critic as Lester Bangs (co-writer with Jessica Blank Center Theater Group, Kirk Douglas Theater, South Coast Rep, ArtsEmerson, Steppenwolf Theatre) Company, Public Theater
- Aftermath (writer; co-wrote with Jessica Blank) New York Theatre Workshop
- Disgraced by Ayad Akhtar (Lincoln Center) Pulitzer Prize 2014
- The Good Negro by Tracey Scott Wilson, directed by Liesl Tommy (Public Theater)
- Y2K by Arthur Kopit (Manhattan Theater Club)
- Corpus Christi by Terrence McNally (Manhattan Theater Club)
- Spain (Manhattan Class Company)
- Schmucks as Lenny Bruce (Wilma Theater, Philadelphia)
