= The Fraternity Years =

Compilation album by Mouse and the Traps
- Released: 1997
- Recorded: 1966–1969
- Genre: Garage rock
- Length: 63:32
- Label: Ace

Mouse and the Traps chronology
Public Execution (1992)	The Fraternity Years (1997)

Professional ratings
Review scores
Source	Rating
Uncut	3/5 stars

The Fraternity Years is a retrospective album that has been released in CD format. As the name implies, the album collects most of the music from the many singles that Mouse and the Traps released on Fraternity Records, so the last two singles released by the band in 1969 on Bell Records are omitted, as are the novelty song "Would You Believe" and the cover of "Psychotic Reaction" by Positively 13 O'Clock. However, the album includes seven previously unreleased songs.

== Release data ==
This album was released as a CD by Ace Records/Big Beat Records in 1997 as #CDWIKD 171.

== Track listing ==
All tracks credited to Mouse and the Traps unless otherwise noted

1. A Public Execution (Henderson, Weiss), 2:49; by Mouse
2. Maid of Sugar, Maid of Spice (Henderson, Weiss), 2:40
3. Nobody Cares (Fouts, Weiss), 2:44
4. Cryin' Inside (Stanley, Weiss), 2:33
5. I'm a Man (Ellas McDaniel), 2:25
6. Lie Beg Borrow & Steal (Weiss), 2:35
7. I've Got Her Love (Barton, Brians), 2:15; by Chris St. John
8. I am the One (Barton, Brians), 2:26
9. Like I Know You Do (Henderson, Weiss), 2:25
10. Sometimes You Just Can't Win (Brians, Henderson), 2:57
11. All for You (Henderson, Weiss), 2:47; by Mouse
12. Do the Best You Can (Brians), 2:25
13. Look at the Sun (Gillespie), 2:41
14. You Don't Love Me (You Don't Care) (Cobbs), 2:09
15. Promises Promises (Brians, Payne), 2:24
16. I Satisfy (Stanley, Weiss), 3:47
17. Requiem for Sarah (Stanley, Weiss), 3:19
18. L.O.V.E. Love (Henderson, Weiss), 2:31
19. Ya Ya (Dorsey, Levy, Lewis, Robinson), 1:57
20. Good Times (Stanley, Weiss), 2:31
21. Hand in Hand (Stanley), 1:59
22. You Are My Sunshine (Davis, Mitchell), 2:23
23. I Wonder Where the Birds Fly, 1:57
24. Mohair Sam (Dallas Frazier), 2:14
25. As Far as the Sea (Barton, Brians), 2:39; by Chris St. John
