= Almost Home =

Almost Home may refer to:

== Music ==
- "Almost Home" (Craig Morgan song), 2002
- "Almost Home" (Mariah Carey song), 2013
- "Almost Home" (Mary Chapin Carpenter song), 1999
- Almost Home (Virginia Coalition EP), 2008
- Almost Home (Kid Ink EP), 2013 EP by rapper Kid Ink
- Almost Home (Evergreen Terrace album), a 2009 album by Evergreen Terrace
- "Almost Home", a song by Moby, from the album Innocents
- "Almost Home", 2019, a song from MercyMe

== Other ==
- The Torkelsons/Almost Home, an American situation comedy
- Almost Home (Canadian TV series), a Canadian educational television program
- Almost Home (novel), a 2007 novel by Jessica Blank
