= Psychotic Reaction (album) =

Studio album by Count Five
- Released: October 1966
- Genres: Garage rock; psychedelic rock
- Length: 24:50
- Label: Double Shot
- Producers: Hal Winn, Joseph Hooven

Count Five chronology
Psychotic Reaction (1966)	Dynamite Incidents (1983)

Singles from Psychotic Reaction
- 1. "Psychotic Reaction" Released: July 1966; 2. "Peace of Mind" Released: November 1966

Psychotic Reaction is the only studio album by the American garage rock band Count Five, released in October 1966, through Double Shot Records.

It features the hit single "Psychotic Reaction", which reached number five on the Billboard Hot 100 chart in October 1966, and the Who covers, "My Generation" and "Out in the Street".

== Background ==
Previously to recording sessions, Count Five was rejected by several record labels before they got signed to the Los Angeles-based Double Shot Records in 1965. Double Shot was an independent label (active 1965-1972) owned by Harold "Hal" Winn and Joseph "Joe" Hooven, who were also songwriters and record producers.

The song "Psychotic Reaction" was released as a single, peaking at number 5 in the U.S. charts in late 1966, after its release in July 1966. To capitalize on the success of the single, Winn and Hooven at Double Shot immediately pressured the band to record a full-length album.

The songs' lyrics were written mostly by John "Sean" Byrne, and the music and vocals were recorded in a very short time, so deliberately included two covers of the Who to complete a brief album of eleven tracks. Band members complained in later interviews that due to the hurried nature of the recording sessions, they never had the chance to shape the songs the way they wanted them to sound. The style of the album is fairly basic but effective, set to the rhythms and ways of garage rock.

== Reception ==
Professional ratings
Review scores
Source	Rating
AllMusic	3/5 stars
New Musical Express	5/10

With a low budget production and insufficient marketing, Psychotic Reaction peaked at number 122 on the Billboard LPs chart. Other singles, released between 1966 and 1969, sold poorly and did not chart (some not included in the original LP). Count Five broke up in 1969 so its members could pursue college educations.

== Track listing ==
All songs written by John Byrne, except where noted.

Side one

1. "Double-Decker Bus" – 2:00
2. "Pretty Big Mouth" (Byrne/Kenn Ellner/Roy Chaney/Craig Atkinson/Mouse Michalski) – 2:07
3. "The World" – 2:12
4. "My Generation" (Pete Townshend) – 2:27
5. "She's Fine" – 2:12
6. "Psychotic Reaction" (Ellner/Chaney/Atkinson/Byrne/Michalski) – 3:03

Side two

1. "Peace of Mind" (Byrne/Chaney/Michalski) – 2:19
2. "They're Gonna Get You" – 2:26
3. "The Morning After" – 1:57
4. "Can't Get Your Lovin'" – 1:47
5. "Out in the Street" (Townshend) – 2:28

== Personnel ==
=== Musicians ===
- John "Sean" Byrne – lead vocals, rhythm guitar
- Kenn Ellner – lead vocals (tracks 4, 8, and 11), tambourine, harmonica
- John "Mouse" Michalski – lead guitar
- Craig "Butch" Atkinson – drums
- Roy Chaney – bass guitar

=== Technical ===
- Hal Winn – producer
- Joseph Hooven – producer
- Sy Mitchell – engineer
- Bernard Yeszin – photography, design
- Irwin Zucker – promotions director

== Charts ==
=== Albums ===
Chart (1966)	Peak position
US Top LPs (Billboard)	122

=== Singles ===
Year	Single	US Hot 100
1966	"Psychotic Reaction"	5
1966	"Peace of Mind"	125
