= Thee Mr. Duran Show =

- Created by: Richard Duran
- Starring: Richard Duran
- Theme music composer: Aaron Ballesteros; Thee Mr. Duran Show Theme Song (2002); Upground; Mr. Duran (2007)
- Country of origin: United States
- Original language: English
- No. of episodes: 74 (at KCAT TV), 19 (at LVTV)

Production
- Executive producer: Christopher Hruby
- Producer: Richard Duran
- Camera setup: Mounted
- Running time: Approx. 58 min

Original release
- Network: East LA Community Television
- Release: November 1, 2000 – 2006
- Network: KCAT TV
- Release: 2004 – 2009
- Network: LVTV
- Release: 2009 – present

Thee Mr. Duran Show is a variety television show. The show is hosted by Richard Duran, and currently films at the LVTV Channel 3 Studio on the campus of the University of La Verne in La Verne, California. Episodes premiere live online at the show's official website, in addition to airing on Public-access television cable TV Channel 3 in the La Verne and San Dimas area, in select viewing areas on Time Warner Cable. The show originally debuted at East L.A. Community Television (formerly Buenavision Cable) in November 2000, before relocating to KCAT in March 2004, whose studio was located on the campus of Glen A. Wilson High School. Thee Mr. Duran Show made its debut on LVTV in October 2009, following the closing of the KCAT Television operations in March 2009. Thee Mr. Duran Show routinely features one live band, performing for approximately 30 minutes, and one to two speaking guests. The use of "Thee" in the title is an homage to the 1960s Chicano rock bands out of East L.A., where Duran grew up, such as Thee Midniters.

== Notable guests ==
Throughout its run, Thee Mr. Duran Show has had in-studio guests such as comedian George Lopez, Los Angeles mayor Antonio Villaraigosa, actor Danny Trejo, professional boxer Mia St. John, KTTV journalist Tony Valdez, Operation Repo host Luis 'Lou' Pizarro, and radio personalities Art Laboe and Huggie Boy. Some of the show's notable musical guests have included Lonnie Jordan of War, Brenton Wood, Thee Midniters, Tierra, Charles Wright & the Watts 103rd Street Rhythm Band, Redbone, American Idol Season 8 finalist Allison Iraheta, Klymaxx featuring guitarist Cheryl Cooley, and Cannibal and the Headhunters.

The show has also filmed interviews on location with actors Ana Ortiz, Mark Indelicato, Constance Marie, musicians Lalo Guerrero, Freddy Fender, Los Lobos, Malo, Ozomatli, El Chicano, Joe Bataan, Debbie Deb, Sheila E and athletes Oscar De La Hoya and Fernando Vargas.

== Achievements ==
Thee Mr. Duran Show has received a number of notable achievements, including being a finalist for the 2006 Western Video Excellence Awards in the Entertainment/Non-Pro category. The show has also been profiled in a 2006 Los Angeles Times article and a KCOP evening news feature. Mr. Duran has also been invited to audition for a 2004 VH1 television pilot and to set of ABC's George Lopez at Warner Bros. studios in Burbank, CA. Duran has also been invited to speak at numerous functions for his alma mater (1972), James A. Garfield High School.
