= Count Five =

American garage rock band

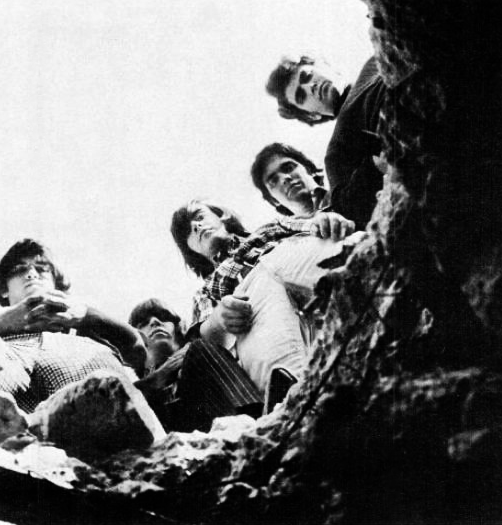
- Count Five in 1966; From left to right: Ron Chaney (bass), Mouse Michalski (lead guitar), Sean Byrne (lead vocals, rhythm guitar), Butch Atkinson (drums), Kenn Ellner (vocals, harmonica)

Background information
- Origin: San Jose, California, U.S.
- Genres: Garage rock; psychedelic rock
- Years active: 1964–1969
- Label: Double Shot
- Past members: Craig "Butch" Atkinson; John "Sean" Byrne; Roy Chaney; Kenn Ellner; John "Mouse" Michalski

Count Five was an American garage rock band formed in San Jose, California, in 1964, best known for their hit single "Psychotic Reaction".

== History ==
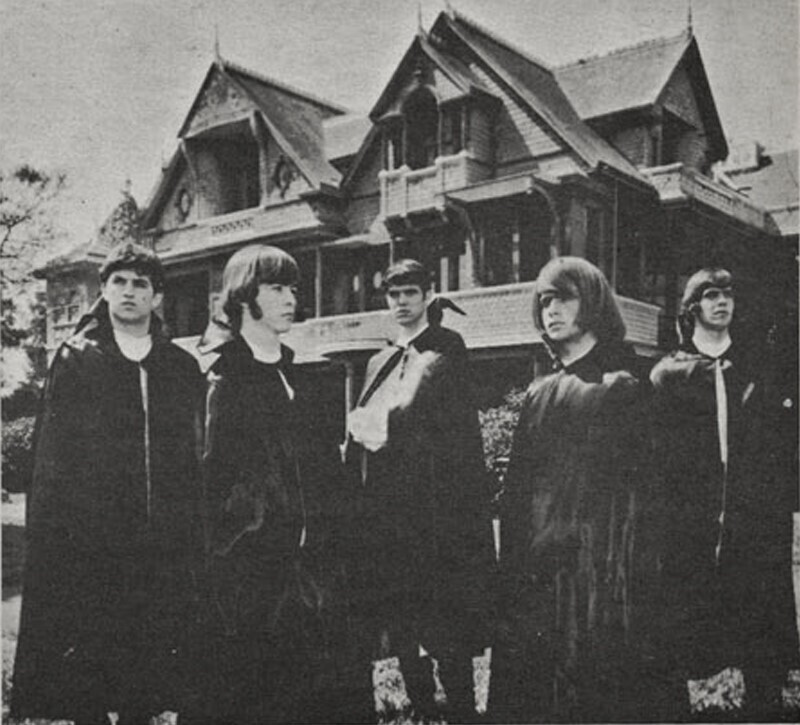
Count Five featured in October 22, 1966 issue of KRLA Beat

The band was founded in 1964 by lead guitarist John "Mouse" Michalski and bassist Roy Chaney. The two, who were friends at Pioneer High School, had previously played in several short-lived bands, most notably a surf rock group named the Citations. As the British Invasion's influence took effect, the band changed in musical direction. After going by the name the Squires for a short time, along with several line-up changes, the Count Five was born. John "Sean" Byrne played rhythm guitar and performed lead vocals; Kenn Ellner played tambourine and harmonica, while sharing lead vocals; and Craig "Butch" Atkinson played drums. The Count Five were recognizable for their habit of wearing Count Dracula–style capes when playing live.

"Psychotic Reaction", an acknowledged cornerstone of garage rock, was initially devised by Byrne, with the group refining it and turning it into the highlight of their live sets. The song was influenced by the style of contemporary musicians such as the Standells and the Yardbirds. The band was rejected by several record labels before they got signed to the Los Angeles-based Double Shot Records. "Psychotic Reaction" was released as a single, peaking at number five in the U.S. charts in late 1966, and it became the title track to their only studio album in 1966. The band enjoyed limited success afterwards before breaking up in 1969.

Count Five reunited in April 1987 when they performed a concert at One Step Beyond nightclub in Santa Clara, California. This was released as Psychotic Reunion LIVE!

== Legacy ==
"Psychotic Reaction" was included on the 1972 compilation album Nuggets: Original Artyfacts from the First Psychedelic Era, 1965–1968. This inclusion was noted as bringing the single and the band to a whole new generation of listeners.

The band was immortalized in a 1971 essay by rock journalist Lester Bangs, entitled "Psychotic Reactions and Carburetor Dung". In the essay, Bangs credited the band for having released several albums after Psychotic Reaction: Carburetor Dung, Cartesian Jetstream, Ancient Lace and Wrought-Iron Railings, and Snowflakes Falling on the International Dateline—each displaying an increasing sense of artistry and refinement. However, none of these subsequent albums existed except in Bangs's own imagination.

"Psychotic Reaction" can be heard playing on the jukebox in an early scene in Wim Wenders's film Alice in the Cities (1974) and in the party scene in The Sense of an Ending (2017). It can also be heard on the season one finale of the HBO drama series Vinyl.

The song was covered by Mouse and the Traps in a 1966 single, the Radiators From Space in a 1977 single, the Cramps on their 1983 live album Smell of Female, by the Fuzztones on their 1987 album Live in Europe! and the Vibrators in 2009, among others.

== Members ==
- John "Sean" Byrne – lead vocals, rhythm guitar (died 2008)
- Kenn Ellner – backing and lead vocals, tambourine, harmonica
- John "Mouse" Michalski – lead guitar
- Roy Chaney – bass guitar
- Craig "Butch" Atkinson – drums
- David "Dave" Eugene McDowell – lead guitar

== Discography ==
=== Studio album ===
- Psychotic Reaction (1966) US No. 122

=== Compilations ===
- Dynamite Incidents (1983)
- Psychotic Reaction (1987)
- Rarities: The Double Shot Years (2014)

=== Live album ===
- Psychotic Reunion LIVE! (1987)

=== Singles ===
- "Psychotic Reaction" / "They're Gonna Get You" (1966) US No. 5
- "Peace of Mind" / "The Morning After" (1966) US No. 125
- "You Must Believe Me" / "Teeny Bopper, Teeny Bopper" (1967)
- "Merry-Go-Round" / "Contrast" (1967)
- "Revelation in Slow Motion" / "Declaration of Independence" (1968)
- "Mailman" / "Pretty Big Mouth" (1969)
