= Psychotic Reaction =

- German single picture sleeve, Hansa

Single by Count Five

from the album Psychotic Reaction
- B-side: "They're Gonna Get You"
- Released: June 1966
- Studio: Hollywood, California
- Genre: Garage rock; acid rock; psychedelic rock; proto-punk
- Length: 2:56
- Label: Double Shot
- Songwriters: Kenn Ellner; Roy Chaney; Craig "Butch" Atkinson; John "Sean" Byrne; John "Mouse" Michalski
- Producers: Hal Winn; Joseph Hooven

Count Five singles chronology
"Psychotic Reaction" (1966)	"Peace of Mind" (1966)

"Psychotic Reaction" is the debut single by the American garage rock band Count Five, released in June 1966 on their debut studio album of the same name.

== Background ==
"Psychotic Reaction" was born out of an instrumental that Count Five played for six months before their manager Sol Ellner, Kenn Ellner's father, suggested that rhythm guitarist John "Sean" Byrne write lyrics for it. Inspiration came in early 1966 when Byrne was seated in a health education class during his freshman year at San Jose City College in California. As his professor lectured about psychosis and neurosis, Byrne's friend Ron Lamb, seated next to him, leaned over and whispered, "You know what would be a great name for a song? Psychotic Reaction!" Byrne later stated, "That was the missing punch-line for the song". He finished the lyrics and presented them to the rest of the group at band practice that night.

I can't tell you how great it felt when those guys burst out of the control booth after we played "Psychotic" and told us, "You've got a record contract."

— John "Sean" Byrne

When the band played the song live a few weeks later at a dance at West Valley College, local KLIV disc jockey Brian Lord, emceeing the event, was very impressed. After a few pointed suggestions on rearranging the tune for a punchier sound, Lord landed the group auditions with several record labels, most of whom turned them down flat. Lord then put the band in touch with a couple of friends in Los Angeles, Hal Winn and Joe Hooven, who were about to start their own label, Double Shot Records. The band drove down to meet them at Decca Studios on Melrose Avenue. They were accompanied by Lord, who had the group begin the audition with some of their other songs before dramatically unveiling "Psychotic Reaction".

== Composition ==
The song's musical key is F♯. It begins with a pentatonic fuzz guitar riff that has been compared to the Rolling Stones' "Susie Q" and Johnny Rivers' "The Seventh Son"; however, scholar Steve Waksman writes that the tone itself is more like the Stones' "(I Can't Get No) Satisfaction" and the Electric Prunes' "I Had Too Much to Dream (Last Night)". Accompanying the riff is a "rhythmic monad" played on the bass drum, and Ellner's "warbling" harmonica. Byrne's less aggressive rhythm guitar then comes in playing a I–♭VII chord progression.

The lyrics of the song describe a state of psychosis triggered by romantic frustration:

I feel depressed, I feel so bad
'Cause you're the best girl that I've ever had
I can't get your love, I can't get a fraction
Uh-oh, little girl, psychotic reaction

At the end of the verse, Byrne shouts, "And it feels like this", leading into an instrumental passage that serves as a "musical analogy" for the singer's mental state. The episode has been called a "rave-up" or "freak-out", a technique that musicologist Michael Hicks describes as "a pseudo-double time section with a corresponding intensification of dynamics". The style was pioneered by the English group the Yardbirds, and as such the song has frequently been compared to them, in particular their 1965 rendition of Bo Diddley's "I'm a Man". The section lasts 45 seconds before a drum fill brings the band back for a second and final verse. At the end of the song, the lead riff briefly returns before a copy of the rave-up, spliced onto the end of the track, plays as the song fades out.

== Release and commercial performance ==
Irwin Zucker, the promotions director for Double Shot, waved "Psychotic Reaction" as the band's first release. The label originally considered another song by the band, "They're Gonna Get You", (Note: Lester Bangs described "They're Gonna Get You" as "a sprung-rhythm essay in barbershop paranoia, particularly shining by a vocal which veered deliriously between a sullen plaint anticipating Iggy [Pop] and a cartoon falsetto.") which was eventually decided to be the B-side. The single was issued in June 1966, on the same day that Ellner and Chaney graduated from Pioneer High School in San Jose. Over the next few months, the song gained heavy airplay on radio stations across the United States and began rapidly ascending the singles charts. The band were initially unaware of the song's success; Byrne said that the first time he heard it on the radio it was announced as the station's "most requested song", while Michalski recalled hearing it on three Bay Area stations at the same time. The single peaked at number 5 on the Billboard Hot 100 in October 1966 and at number 3 on the Canadian RPM 100 later that month. "Psychotic Reaction" was among the first successful acid (or psychedelic rock) songs, containing the characteristics that would come to define acid rock: the use of feedback and distortion replacing early rock music's more melodic electric guitars.

To capitalize on the success of the single, Double Shot immediately pressured the band to record a full-length album. As a strategic decision, their debut album was also titled Psychotic Reaction, released in October 1966, including seven new songs composed mostly by John Byrne.

== Critical reception ==
Richie Unterberger in Allmusic said: "the verses are thus almost stereotypical sub-British blues-rock, yet have a hypnotic groove of their own, and the vocals have a respectably sullen power, if in a somewhat downer frame of mind (in accordance with the lyrics about being depressed and romantically rejected)".

The song was included in the Rock and Roll Hall of Fame's list of the "500 Songs That Shaped Rock and Roll". In 2014, the song placed seventh on Paste's list of the "50 Best Garage Rock Songs of All Time".

== Usage in media ==
This song appears in the games Battlefield Vietnam (2004), Mafia 3 (2016), and Far Cry 5 (2018).

"Psychotic Reaction" has been featured in films such as Marek Kanievska's Less than Zero (1987), Gus Van Sant's Drugstore Cowboy (1989), Paul Schrader´s Auto Focus (2002) and Randall Miller's CBGB (2013), and has done very well on Classic Rock radio.

The song is also featured in the second-season episode "Bad Friend" from the HBO series Girls and the tenth episode "Alibi" from the HBO series Vinyl, and in an IKEA television advert on UK's Channel 4 (May 2019).

== Cover versions ==
Because of its inclusion on the original Pebbles compilation album, probably the best known of the many obscure covers of this song that were made in the 1960s is the one by Positively 13 O'Clock (i.e., Jimmy Rabbitt with members of Mouse and the Traps and others) in 1967. The song has been covered by Brenton Wood, on his 1967 album Oogum Boogum. It was also recorded by the 1960s studio-only band, The Leathercoated Minds, in 1966 on their album A Trip Down the Sunset Strip.

The song is one of the many songs quoted and parodied on the 1976 album The Third Reich 'n Roll by the avant-garde group The Residents. "Psychotic Reaction" was also covered during the 1970s by The Radiators from Space (B-side to "Enemies", 1977) and by Television, who included the song in their early sets which emphasized the "rave-up" section. Covers made during the 1980s include a live version by The Cramps on their 1983 live mini-album, Smell of Female and by artist Nash the Slash. The Nash the Slash version was released on his 1984 album American Bandages, inserting paraphrased excerpts of John Hinckley's letter to Jodie Foster, as well as lines from the movie "Taxi Driver", between the verses.

Horror punk/metal band Haunted Garage covered the song on their 1991 album Possession Park. Other cover versions include a live version by The Fuzztones and a version by The Vibrators on their album Garage Punk (2009). This song is also played live by Tom Petty and the Heartbreakers on the Playback box set and seen in the currently out of print concert video, "Take the Highway" sung by drummer Stan Lynch. The Night Beats from Seattle, Washington have played it most nights of their 2011 U.S. and European dates. The Murlocs contributed a cover to Nuggets: Antipodean Interpolations of the First Psychedelic Era in 2012, a tribute album of all Australian artists to celebrate the 40th anniversary of the original Nuggets compilation that featured the original Count Five recording.

== Personnel ==
Count Five

- John "Sean" Byrne - vocals & rhythm guitar
- John "Mouse" Michalski - fuzz guitar
- Craig "Butch" Atkinson - drums
- Kenn Ellner - harmonica
- Roy Chaney - Fender bass guitar
