= Mouse and the Traps =

American rock band

- Origin: Tyler, Texas, United States
- Genres: Garage rock, folk rock
- Years active: 1965–1969, 1986
- Labels: Fraternity; Bell (1950s-70s)
- Past members: Ronny (Mouse) Weiss; Dave Stanley; Bugs Henderson; Jerry Howell; Ken (Nardo) Murray; Bobby Delk; Don (Levi) Garrett; Tim Gillespie; Brady Mosher; Don Kelly; Rick (RP) Harrell

Mouse and the Traps was an American garage rock band from Tyler, Texas, United States, that released numerous singles between 1965 and 1969, two of which, "A Public Execution" and "Sometimes You Just Can't Win", became large regional hits. The leader of the band, nicknamed "Mouse", was Ronny Weiss. Two of their best known songs, "A Public Execution" and a cover of "Psychotic Reaction", are not actually credited to this band but, respectively, to simply Mouse and Positively 13 O'Clock instead. Their history also included one single that was released under the pseudonym Chris St. John. The band are not to be confused with the girl group Mousie and The Traps who recorded for Toddlin' Town Records around the same time.

== Early history ==
Ronny (Mouse) Weiss (né Ronald Lon Weiss; born 1942) and Dave Stanley (né Samuel David Stanley; born 1946) were members of a local band named Jerry Vee and the Catalinas (or simply the Catalinas) in 1964. Weiss had also performed on a regional hit single "Lucky Lips" by Steve Wright and The Catalinas that was later released nationally by Dot Records.

In this time period, they met Bugs Henderson (or Buggs Henderson), lead guitarist for a local instrumental band, the Sensors. Weiss and Knox Henderson – no relation to Buddy (Bugs) Henderson - co-wrote "A Public Execution" and brought the song to Robin Hood Brians, who manages Robin Hood Studios that is still in operation in Tyler, Texas today. This song – which strongly resembles Bob Dylan's music in the mid-1960s – was released as the band's first single in 1966 under the name Mouse. Jerry Howell (who was also in Jerry Vee and the Catalinas) and Ken (Nardo) Murray joined the group shortly thereafter, and most of their remaining music was released under the name Mouse and the Traps. Besides Brians, other musicians that have played in various incarnations of the band over the years include Bobby Delk, Don (Levi) Garrett and Tim Gillespie.

After releasing several singles on the Fraternity Records label, Mouse and the Traps also recorded two singles for Bell Records that were produced by Dale Hawkins. The band also performed on two of Hawkins' singles and contributed toward his 1966 album on the label, L.A., Memphis and Tyler, Texas. The band broke up in 1969, but all members remained in music except Jerry Howell (who became a Baptist minister).

By 1966, the members of Mouse and the Traps – along with Robin Hood Brians and Doug Rhone – were working with singer Jimmy Rabbitt, who was attempting to launch a band under the name, Positively 13 O'Clock. Continuing their Dylan connection, the name is an obvious play on Dylan's hit in the same time period, "Positively 4th Street". A Los Angeles studio session at Hanna-Barbera Records in September 1966 resulted in their only recorded single, that included a frantic version of Count Five's "Psychotic Reaction". However, a planned album for the band never materialized.

== Musical highlights ==
The first single by Mouse, "A Public Execution," has been described as more Dylanesque than any of their later music and reached No. 121 on Billboard Bubbling Under the Hot 100 chart. The single was released on REO Records in Canada as well and became a regional hit in Ottawa, where many local bands frequently covered the song. In the original liner notes of the Nuggets compilation album, Lenny Kaye states of this song: "There are some who say that Mouse does Dylan's Highway 61 period better than the Master himself". Another reviewer remarked: "['A Public Execution'] is to Dylan what the Knickerbockers' 'Lies' is to the Beatles: one of the few rip-offs so utterly accurate that it could easily fool listeners into mistaking it for the original article".

Their second, punkier single was "Maid of Sugar, Maid of Spice",. Although the song did not repeat their earlier chart success, it appears on more compilation albums than the better-known "A Public Execution". The next single was a novelty song that went in a completely different direction. Titled "Would You Believe", it was a take-off on the running gag of that name by Don Adams on the television sitcom Get Smart. A promo exists that shows the artist of this third single as only Mouse. However, a more subdued, later single "Sometimes You Just Can't Win" spent one week at No. 125 and was a regional hit in Tyler, Texas, Nashville, Tennessee and Louisville, Kentucky.

AllMusic describes Mouse and the Traps as "a fine band who was probably too chameleon-like to find their niche in the national market".

By 1968, Bugs Henderson had formed another band called The Dream and was playing nightclub venues around Dallas.

== Post breakup ==
The band reformed briefly in 1972 but had a genuine reunion in 1986 with the original members during the Texas Sesquicentennial celebration, with a performance at Flag Pole Hill in Dallas before an estimated 7000 people. A videotape of the 1986 reunion concert is reportedly available from Marc Hood Productions.

Weiss formed the country music band Rio Grande, which released a self-titled LP for RCA Victor in 1971; music critic Robert Christgau called it "a perfectly competent-plus mod-country band which has gone virtually unacknowledged in print". Weiss continues to tour and perform regularly, and often with his former bandmates; he is also a writer and is in demand as a session player.

Bugs Henderson had a renowned career as an influential blues/rock guitarist with eight albums to his credit. His 2004 release on No Guru Records, Stormy Love includes a version of "Maid of Sugar, Maid of Spice". He died from complications of liver cancer on March 8, 2012, four days after a benefit concert in his name.

Dave Stanley and Ken (Nardo) Murray, together with Larry Stanley founded the Lone Star Ramblers. They were featured performers at Dolly Parton's theme park, Dollywood from 1988 to 1996, and also appear annually at the Texas State Fair. They have released 10 albums and several video productions and also perform as the Stanley Murray Stanley Band and (at Christmastime) the Strolling Santas.

Jimmy Rabbitt has had a long and varied career as a rockabilly musician. He is also a celebrated Dallas and Los Angeles disc jockey who has had an internationally syndicated radio program, The Rabbitt Report since 1971. (Although the vocalist's name for Positively 13 O'Clock is sometimes spelled as "Jimmy Rabbit", he was evidently not a member of an obscure 1960's garage rock band, Jimmy Rabbit and the Karats). Rabbitt was signed to Capitol Records as Jimmy Rabbitt and Renegade. An album was produced by Waylon Jennings and the band consisted of former Sweathog (band) bass player, David L. Johnson.

54 years after releasing "A Public Execution," and three years after Dylan became the first songwriter to receive the Nobel Prize for Literature, the dream of an entire Mouse And The Traps album devoted to the music of Bob Dylan came to fruition. "As a producer and songwriter, when you first start a recording session, you are never sure if you have a hit or not. That's not the case when you start an album of Dylan songs. You know the material is good," producer Robin Hood Brians says. "We felt the responsibility of introducing a new generation to Dylan. Our greatest hope is they will appreciate his music as much as we do," Mouse explains.

Their new album, Walking in Dylan's Shoes, was released on December 20, 2020. It contains fourteen songs written by Bob Dylan, performed by the current members of the band, which includes three original members, Ronny "Mouse" Weiss, Dave Stanley on bass and harmonica, and Ken (Nardo) Murray on drums. Replacing Henderson is Dave's brother, Larry Stanley and Gary Don Freeman plays organ and keyboards. Their producer, Robin Hood Brians, also plays piano on this new album, which was recorded at Robin Hood Studios in Tyler, Texas. Coinciding with the release of Walking in Dylan's Shoes, a feature-length documentary about the band has been produced by Allen Morris. The documentary includes six songs from the band's early recordings and includes studio performances of five songs from the new album.

== Retrospective albums ==
The music by Mouse and the Traps and the other associated bands has been assembled by two European record labels on retrospective albums. The first was an LP called Public Execution that was released in 1982 (on Eva Records), which included nearly all of their singles, including the Positively 13 O'Clock record. The LP was re-released on CD by New Rose Blues Records in 1995 with four bonus tracks, including both sides of the 45 that was released under the name of Chris St. John. Out of the 25 recordings on their various singles, the only un-reissued tracks are on their final Bell Records single, "Knock on My Door" and "Where's the Little Girl". (The reason that there is an odd number of recordings is that "Cryin' Inside" was released as the "B" side of a 1968 single after its original release in 1967).

Also, in 1997, a CD was released on Ace Records/Big Beat Records with seven previously unreleased songs that is still in print. Both retrospective albums are comprehensive overviews of the band's career, although the two albums have several tracks that are not in common. Their recordings are also widely available on numerous compilation albums of garage rock music.

== Band members ==
=== Mouse ("A Public Execution") ===
- Ronnie (Mouse) Weiss, 12-String Guitar and Vocals.
- Dave Stanley, Bass Guitar.
- Bugs Henderson, Guitar.
- Don (Levi) Garrett, Drums.
- Randy Fouts, Piano.
- Robin Hood Brians, Farfisa Organ.

=== Mouse and the Traps (Original line-up) ===
- Ronnie (Mouse) Weiss, Guitar and Vocals.
- Dave Stanley, Bass Guitar.
- Bugs Henderson, Lead Guitar.
- Jerry Howell, Keyboardist.
- Ken (Nardo) Murray, Drummer.

=== Mouse and the Traps (1972 Reunion line-up) ===
- Ronnie (Mouse) Weiss, Guitar and Vocals.
- Dave Stanley, Bass Guitar.
- Bobby Delk, Keyboards.
- Ken (Nardo) Murray, Drums.
- Ron Spier (Lead Guitar)

=== Mouse and the Traps (1980 - 1981 line-up) ===
- Ronnie (Mouse) Weiss, Guitar and Vocals.
- Dave Stanley, Bass Guitar.
- Brady Mosher, Guitar and Vocals.
- Ron Mason, Keyboards.
- Ken (Nardo) Murray, Drums.

=== Mouse and the Traps (Occasional reunion line-up) ===
- Ronnie (Mouse) Weiss, Guitar and Vocals.
- Dave Stanley, Bass Guitar.
- Larry Stanley, Lead Guitar.
- Ken (Nardo) Murray, Drums.

=== Positively 13 O'Clock ===
Positively 13 O'Clock was a project by Jimmy Rabbitt, backed by members of Mouse and the Traps. Only the one single "Psychotic Reaction" was released

- Jimmy Rabbitt, guitar and vocals
- Ronny (Mouse) Weiss, guitar and vocals
- Dave Stanley, bass guitar
- Bugs Henderson, lead guitar
- Doug Rhone, guitar
- Robin Hood Brians, keyboards
- Ken (Nardo) Murray, drums
- James SK Wān, bamboo flute

=== Walking in Dylan's Shoes ===
The line-up of musicians on this album, released December 20, 2020, includes:

- Ronny (Mouse) Weiss, acoustic guitar, electric guitar, dobro, steel and gut guitar, and vocals
- Dave Stanley, bass guitar, harmonica
- Larry Stanley, 12-string guitar, gut guitar, electric guitar, banjo
- Ken (Nardo) Murray, drums and percussion
- Robin Hood Brians, piano and backup vocals
- Suzzan Briand, backup vocals
- Gary Don Freeman, organ, keyboards, accordion
- Curtis Fox, trombone

== Discography ==
=== Retrospective albums ===
- Public Execution; Eva Records (#EV-12001); 1982 release on LP
- Public Execution; New Rose Blues Records (#4015); 1995 re-release on CD (with 4 bonus tracks)
- The Fraternity Years; Ace/Big Beat Records (#CDWIKD 171); 1997 release on CD

=== Singles ===
==== As Mouse ====
- "A Public Execution" b/w "All for You"; Fraternity Records (#F-956) – Dec. 1965
- "A Public Execution" b/w "All for You"; REO Records (#8912X) – 1966 (Canadian release)
- "Would You Believe?" b/w "Like I Know You Do"; Fraternity Records (#F-971) – 1966 (promo only)

==== As Mouse and the Traps ====
- "Maid of Sugar, Maid of Spice" b/w "I Am the One"; Fraternity Records (#F-966) – 1966
- "Would You Believe?" b/w "Like I Know You Do"; Fraternity Records (#F-971) – 1966
- "Do the Best You Can" b/w "Promises Promises"; Fraternity Records (#F-973) – 1967
- "Cryin' Inside" b/w "Ya Ya"; Fraternity Records (#F-989) – 1967
- "L.O.V.E. Love" b/w "L.O.V.E. Love"; Fraternity Records (#F-1000) – 1967 (promo only)
- "L.O.V.E. Love" b/w "Lie, Beg, Borrow and Steal"; Fraternity Records (#F-1000) – 1967
- "Sometimes You Just Can't Win" b/w "Cryin' Inside"; Fraternity Records (#F-1005) – 1968
- "I Satisfy" (long version) b/w "I Satisfy" (short version); Fraternity Records (#F-1011) – 1968 (promo only)
- "I Satisfy" b/w "Good Times"; Fraternity Records (#F-1011) – 1968
- "Requiem For Sarah" b/w "Look At The Sun"; Fraternity Records (#F-1015) – 1968
- "Wicker Vine" b/w "And I Believe Her"; Bell Records (#850) – 1969

==== As Positively 13 O'Clock ====
- "Psychotic Reaction" b/w "13 O'Clock Theme For Psychotics"; Hanna-Barbera Records (#HBR-500) – 1967

==== As Chris St. John ====
- "I've Got Her Love" b/w "As Far As The Sea"; Fraternity Records (#F-983) – 1967

The singles "Where's The Little Girl" b/w "Knock On My Door" (Bell #870, April 1970) and "Woman Or A Girl" b/w "I Can Only Touch You With My Eyes" (Bell #918, September 1970), both credited to "M.O.U.S.E.", are sometimes mistakenly thought to be by Mouse and the Traps; they are in fact by a group from Jacksonville, Florida, who also recorded as Mouse and the Boys.

== Compilation albums ==
"A Public Execution"

1. Nuggets: Original Artyfacts from the First Psychedelic Era, 1965-1968 (LP)
2. Nuggets: Original Artyfacts from the First Psychedelic Era, 1965-1968 (CD box set)
3. Excerpts from Nuggets (CD)
4. More Nuggets (CD)
5. Nuggets, Volume 6 (LP)
6. Texas Music, Volume 3 (CD)

"Maid of Sugar, Maid of Spice"

1. Nuggets: Original Artyfacts from the First Psychedelic Era, 1965-1968 (CD box set)
2. Nuggets, Volume 12 (LP)
3. Acid Dreams Testament (CD)
4. The Complete Acid Dreams (CD box set)
5. Glimpses, Volume 1 (LP)
6. Glimpses, Volumes 1 and 2 (CD)
7. Uptight Tonight (CD)

"Lie, Beg, Borrow & Steal"

1. Beat It (CD)
2. Ace 30th Birthday Celebration: Garage, Beat & Punk Rock (CD)

"Good Times"

1. Sixties Archives, Volume 2 (CD)
2. Texas Punk Groups in the Sixties, Volume 1 (LP)
3. Zona de Obros Especial, Volume 3 (CD)

"I Satisfy"

1. Sixties Archives, Volume 2 (CD)
2. Texas Punk Groups in the Sixties, Volume 1 (LP)
3. Psychedelic Unknowns, Volume 4 (LP)
4. Psychedelic Unknowns, Volume 4 (CD)

"Sometimes You Just Can't Win"

1. Instant Garage (CD)

"Psychotic Reaction"

1. Pebbles, Volume 1 (LP, CD)
2. Pebbles Box (LP box set)
3. Great Pebbles (CD)
4. Trash Box (CD box set)
5. Songs We Taught The Fuzztones (LP, CD)
6. Psychedelic Archives USA Garage, Volume 1 (cassette)
