= A Public Execution =

Single by Mouse and the Traps
- B-side: "All for You"
- Released: December 1965
- Recorded: 1965, Robin Hood Studio
- Genre: Folk rock, garage rock
- Length: 2:43
- Label: Fraternity
- Songwriter(s): Ronny "Mouse" Weiss (music); Knox Henderson (words)
- Producer(s): Robin Hood Brians

Mouse and the Traps singles chronology
"A Public Execution" (1965)	"Made of Sugar, Made of Spice" (1966)

"A Public Execution" is a song performed and recorded by the American band Mouse and the Traps, also credited simply as Mouse, written by Ronny "Mouse" Weiss (né Ronald Lon Weiss; born 1942) (music) and Knox Henderson (né Knox Holmes Henderson; 1939–2002) (words), and first released as the group's debut single on Fraternity Records in December 1965 (see 1965 in music). The song was a big regional hit in Texas and peaked in the lower reaches of the Billboard charts, but has become better-known today, in large part, due to the band's uncanny imitation of Highway 61 Revisited-era Bob Dylan.

"A Public Execution" was originally a one-time studio-project by Weiss at Robin Hood Studios, owned by Robin Hood Brians, Jr. (born 1939), with no real expectations for commercial success. The song is based around a basic ascending tandem guitar-organ riff that has a striking similarity to Dylan's "Like a Rolling Stone". It's Dylanesque characteristics continue with Weiss's lead vocal, described by music historian Richie Unterberger as being "like vintage Dylan, a grinning, surrealistic, half-spoken rant" at a specific woman that boasted about being better-off without her. Weiss's homage, borderline parody, to Dylan concludes with an enthusiastic yowl, again, a detail featured on "Like a Rolling Stone". Unterberger goes on to characterize "A Public Execution" as "one of the few rip-offs so utterly accurate that it could easily fool listeners into believing it was the original article". Arguably, the tune is among the most accurate Dylan imitations to emerge from the era, not even replicated by Mouse and the Traps on their later recordings.

Upon release, "A Public Execution" bubbled under the Billboard Hot 100 at number 121. It was a tremendous regional hit for the group and proved to be their most successful release. The tune has since gained wider recognition for being featured on the groundbreaking album Nuggets: Original Artyfacts from the First Psychedelic Era, 1965-1968 in 1972, along with other Nuggets releases More Nuggets, Volume 2 and Nuggets: Volume 6, Punk Part 2. In later years, the song has appeared on the compilation albums Public Execution and The Fraternity Years.
