= Bugs Henderson =

American blues guitarist (1943–2012)

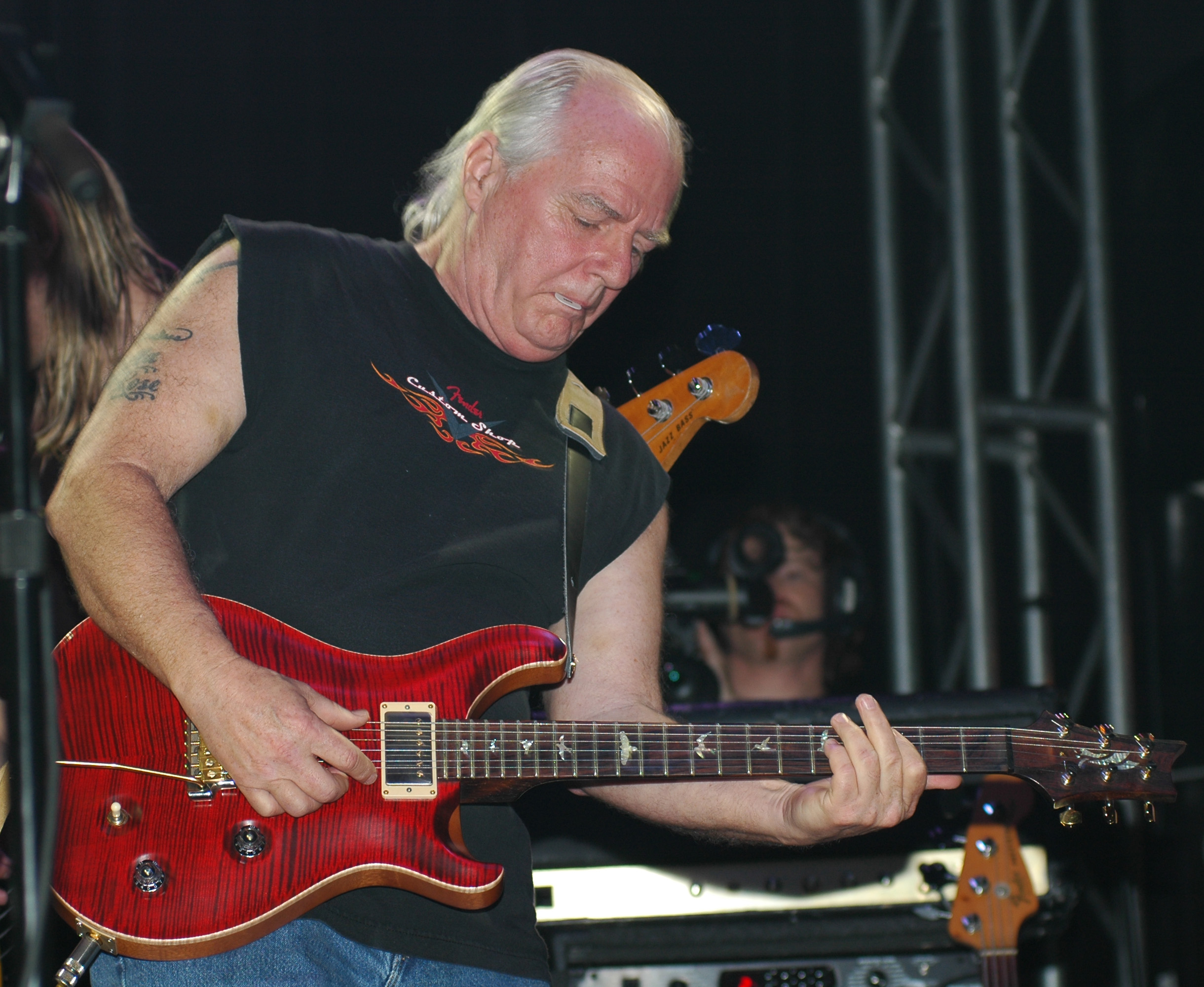
- Henderson in 2006

Background information
- Also known as: Buddy Henderson
- Born: Harry Fisher Henderson; October 20, 1943; Palm Springs, California, U.S.
- Died: March 9, 2012 (aged 68) Jefferson, Texas, U.S.
- Genres: Blues rock; electric blues; Texas blues
- Occupations: Musician; singer; songwriter
- Instruments: Vocals; guitar
- Years active: 1960–2012
- Labels: Armadillo Records; Burnside Records; Capitol Records
- Formerly of: Mouse and the Traps; Nitzinger; Shuffle Kings; B. B. King; Eric Clapton; Muddy Waters; Stevie Ray Vaughan; Ted Nugent; James Burton

Buddy Henderson (né Harry Fisher Henderson; October 20, 1943 – March 9, 2012), better known as "Bugs" Henderson, was an American blues guitarist. He was popular in Europe and from the 1970s, was based in Dallas–Fort Worth, Texas, where he was known as a local blues guitar legend.

Henderson was born in Palm Springs, California, and spent his early life in Tyler, Texas, where he formed a band called the Sensores at age 16, and later joined Mouse and the Traps. In Dallas–Fort Worth during the early 1970s, he was lead guitarist for the blues/rock band Nitzinger before forming the Shuffle Kings and later a band that was eponymously named. Henderson played with blues musicians such as B. B. King, Eric Clapton, Muddy Waters, and Stevie Ray Vaughan, as well as with rhythm and blues saxophonist Don Wise and rock guitarist Ted Nugent.

Henderson died just four days after a benefit concert in his name from complications of liver cancer, aged 68, in March 2012. The performers at the 11-hour "Benefit Bugs" event included Ray Wylie Hubbard, Smokin' Joe Kubek & Bnois King, and Mouse and the Traps, the band from early in his career with the hit songs, "A Public Execution" and "Maid of Sugar – Maid of Spice" that featured his guitar solos.

== Discography ==
with Nitzinger

- 1972 – One Foot in History

as The Bugs Henderson Group

- 1978 – At Last-Live
- 1981 – Still Flyin'
- 1989 – Backbop

as Bugs Henderson

- 1982 – Back Bop! The Unreleased '82 Sessions
- 1993 – Years in the Jungle
- 1995 – Daredevils of the Red Guitar

with The Stratoblasters

- 1986 – Texan Eagles

as Bugs Henderson & The Shuffle Kings

- 1992 – Gitarbazndrumz (Live)
- 1993 – American Music
- 1995 – That's the Truth (Live)
- 1996 – Four Tens Strike Again
- 1997 – Henderson & Jones (Live)
- 1998 – Have Blues...Must Rock
- 2000 – Call of the Wild (Live at the Meisenfrei)
- 2001 – Adventures of the Shuffle Kings
- 2003 – We're a Texas Band – Live in Germany
- 2004 – Stormy Love
- 2008 – Blue Music
- 2009 - Vienna Calling

with R. Buchanan, F. King, T. Nugent, J. Winter

- 1997 – Legendary Jams 1976–1980

=== Compilations ===
- 1998 – Heartbroke Again, Blue Flame, BFBL001
- 2006 – Electric Snow "The Best Of"
