= Psychotic Reactions and Carburetor Dung =

Psychotic Reactions and Carburetor Dung: The Work of a Legendary Critic: Rock 'n' Roll as Literature and Literature as Rock 'n' Roll
- Author: Lester Bangs
- Language: English
- Publisher: Anchor Press
- Publication date: 1987
- Publication place: United States
- Pages: 416 pp
- ISBN: 0-679-72045-6

Psychotic Reactions and Carburetor Dung: The Work of a Legendary Critic: Rock 'n' Roll as Literature and Literature as Rock 'n' Roll is a collection of essays written by rock music critic Lester Bangs. Named for a 1971 article of the same title, it was edited by Greil Marcus and released in 1987, five years after Bangs' death. In his introduction, Marcus explains that, "Perhaps what this book demands from a reader is a willingness to accept that the best writer in America could write almost nothing but record reviews."

The book consists mainly of Bangs' published articles, beginning with his early work for Creem magazine before moving into his later writings as a freelancer for New Musical Express and other publications. Many of his most famous works are present, including the title piece on garage rock band the Count Five and the Troggs-inspired "James Taylor Marked for Death" from his earlier career as well as an acclaimed profile of the Clash and a tribute to Van Morrison's album Astral Weeks from his later years. One chapter of the book is devoted entirely to Bangs' infamous series of interviews with Lou Reed, including "Let Us Now Praise Famous Death Dwarves," while another chapter features unpublished essays and an unfinished novel excerpt, "Maggie May".

== Contents ==
=== I. Two Testaments ===
- Psychotic Reactions and Carburetor Dung: A Tale of These Times
- Astral Weeks

=== II. Blowing It Up ===
- Of Pop and Pies and Fun: A Program for Mass Liberation in the Form of a Stooges Review, or, Who's the Fool?
- James Taylor Marked for Death
- Do the Godz Speak Esperanto?

=== III. Creemwork--Frauds, Failures, and Fantasies ===
- Chicago at Carnegie Hall, Volumes I, II, III, & IV
- Black Oak Arkansas: Keep the Faith
- White Witch
- John Coltrane Lives
- The Guess Who: Live at the Paramount
- James Taylor: One Man Dog
- The Incredibly Strange Creatures Who Stopped Living and Became Mixed-Up Zombies, or, The Day the Airwaves Erupted
- Jethro Tull in Vietnam
- Screwing the System with Dick Clark
- Slade: Sladest
- My Night of Ecstasy with the J. Geils Band
- Johnny Ray's Better Whirlpool
- Barry White: Just Another Way to Say I Love You
- Kraftwerkfeature
- David Bowie: Station to Station

=== IV. Slaying the Father ===
- from Untitled Notes on Lou Reed
- Let Us Now Praise Famous Death Dwarves, or, How I Slugged It Out with Lou Reed and Stayed Awake
- How to Succeed in Torture without Really Trying, or, Louie Come Home, All is Forgiven
- The Greatest Album Ever Made
- from Untitled Notes on Lou Reed

=== V. Slaying the Children, Burying the Dead, Signs of Life ===
- Iggy Pop: Blowtorch in Bondage
- I Saw God and/or Tangerine Dream
- Where Were You When Elvis Died?
- Peter Laughner
- The Clash
- Richard Hell: Death Means Never Having to Say You're Incomplete
- Growing Up True Is Hard to Do
- The White Noise Supremacists
- Sham 69 is Innocent!
- New Year's Eve
- Otis Rush Mugged by an Iceberg
- Thinking the Unthinkable About John Lennon
- A Reasonable Guide to Horrible Noise

=== VI. Unpublishable ===
- Fragments
- from Notes on PiL's Metal Box
- from "All My Friends are Hermits"
- Review of Peter Guralnick's Lost Highway: Journeys & Arrivals of American Musicians
- from Notes for Review of Peter Guralnick's Lost Highway
- from "The Scorn Papers"
- from "Women on Top: Ten Post-Lib Role Models for the Eighties," a book proposal
- from "Maggie May"

=== VII. Untitled ===
- from Untitled Notes
