= Dalton & Dubarri =

American rock band

- Origin: United States
- Genres: Soul; rock
- Years active: 1974–1979
- Labels: Columbia; ABC; Atlantic; Hilltak
- Past members: Gary Dalton; Kent DuBarri; Rick Allen; Patrick Gleason; Brad Palmer; Tony Peluso

Dalton & Dubarri was an American rock band active in the 1970s, led by Gary Dalton and Kent Dubarri. They mainly played as support acts for artists such as The Beach Boys, Elvin Bishop, The Doobie Brothers, Loggins and Messina, Dave Mason, Boz Scaggs, and Rod Stewart. The group incorporated various aspects of pop, rock, and soul into their music. Recording for Columbia, ABC, and Hilltak, they released four original albums during their career. In 1979, they had a hit with the disco single "I Can Dance All By Myself", which made the Billboard, Cash Box, and Record World charts.

== History ==
=== Background and formation: 1960s–1974 ===
Dalton & Dubarri was founded by Gary Dalton Stovall and Kent DuBarri Sprague, who also went by the name Butch DuBarri. DuBarri was born and raised in Quincy, Illinois.

During the 1960s, Kent Sprague was the drummer and leader of a Los Angeles-based band, Kent and the Candidates, who backed Brenton Wood. They also recorded several singles for the Double Shot label, including "Trouble", which was released in August 1967, at the same time as Brenton Wood published the song "Gimme Little Sign". Dalton additionally played guitar and sang in the rock band Churchill Downs, in 1967 and 1968.

In the early 1970s, Dalton and DuBarri were in a band called Boones Farm, which released an album in 1972.

=== Dalton & Dubarri: 1974–1979 ===
Introducing themselves to the music scene, the band's New York debut was at Madison Square Garden and they played their first Los Angeles show at the Troubadour.

Dalton & Dubarri's first two albums were the self-titled Dalton & Dubarri (1973) and Good Head (1974), both released on Columbia. After failing to achieve a commercial breakthrough with either record, they were dropped by the label. They went on to publish Success and Failure for ABC in 1976. This was followed by Choice, released by Hilltak in 1979, which included the hit song "I Can Dance All By Myself". On May 5, 1979, it was a recommended soul song on Billboard's Top Single Picks. It made #79 on the Billboard Hot Soul Singles chart. The track also entered the Record World Singles 101 to 150 Chart at #131 for the week of May 26, 1979, making it to #123 on June 23. It entered the Cash Box Top 100 chart at #94 for the week of June 2, 1979, reaching #73 in its fourth week, on June 23. They had another hit in 1979 with "'Til the Day I Started Lovin' You", which got to #76 on the Billboard R&B chart. This was followed by "Flying Free", also released on Hilltak.

== Band members ==
- Gary Dalton – guitar, vocals
- Kent DuBarri – drums, percussion, vocals
- Patrick Gleason – synthesizer
- Brad Palmer – bass, vocals
- Tony Peluso – piano, clavinet
- Rick Allen – Hammond organ

== Discography ==
Studio albums
Release	Catalogue	Year	Notes
Dalton & Dubarri	Columbia KC 32542	1973	
Good Head	Columbia KC 33052	1974	
Success and Failure	ABC / Phonodisc ABCD-964	1976	
Choice	Hlltak HT 19226	1979	

Singles
Release	Catalogue	Year	Notes
"Helpless" / ?	Columbia 4-45967	1973	
"Success and Failure" / "Daddies Never Know"	ABC ABC 12207	1976	
"Cold Outside Your Love" / "Daddies Never Know"	ABC 12231	1976	
"Caught in the Act" / "Keepin' It Up"	Hilltak HT 7804	1979	
"I Can Dance All By Myself" / "Keepin' It Up"	Hilltak HT 7806	1979	
"'Til the Day I Started Lovin' You" / "Keepin' It Up"	Hilltak PW 7902	1979	
"Flyin' Free / ?	Hilltak PW 7904	1979	
