= Undermind (film) =

- Film poster
- Directed by: Nevil Dwek
- Written by: Nevil Dwek
- Produced by: Fred Bernstein; Mark Tarlov
- Starring: Sam Trammell; Erik Jensen; Susan May Pratt; Celia Weston; Jon De Vries; Aasif Mandvi; Tara Subkoff; Peter Giles; Ellen Pompeo; Michael Ryan Segal; Jeffrey Emerson; Guillermo Díaz; David Frank; Rocco Sisto; Aliya Campbell; David Gevedon; Mike Hodge
- Cinematography: Wolfgang Held
- Edited by: Andrew Weisblum
- Music by: Joel Goodman
- Production companies: Vertical Pictures; Double A Films
- Distributed by: Vantage Media International
- Release date: July 20, 2003
- Country: United States
- Language: English

Undermind is a 2003 psychological thriller film written and directed by Nevil Dwek and starring Sam Trammell, Erik Jensen, and Susan May Pratt.

== Plot ==
Derrick, a corporate lawyer with a large trust fund, and Zane, a criminal, live in opposite social spheres. Although they have never met, their lives are more connected than either one of them could ever imagine. One morning, the privileged Derrick wakes up in a different apartment, in bed with a woman he has never seen before. It's clear that she knows him, but she calls him Zane, and so does everybody else. Derrick finds himself living Zane's criminal life, where people strangely resemble those in his real life. Meanwhile, Zane has also entered a parallel world and must now grapple with Derrick's life. He is seduced by Derrick's privileged world of money and power, as he begins to contend with Derrick's demons. He yearns to return and improve his own life, but is completely powerless to do so. As Derrick and Zane make their way through the life of the other, they start to reshape their new worlds, in which they discover inner strengths that neither knew he possessed.

== Cast ==
- Sam Trammell as Derrick Hall/Zane Waye
- Erik Jensen as Ian
- Susan May Pratt as Lucy/Olivia
- Celia Weston as Lillian Hall/Mrs. Winters
- Jon De Vries as Benjamin Cox/Captain Ferguson
- Aasif Mandvi as Shark/Roger
- Tara Subkoff as Anya
- Peter Giles as Gordon
- Ellen Pompeo as Flynn
- Michael Ryan Segal as Dylan
- Jeffrey Emerson as Sam
- Guillermo Díaz as Ray
- David Frank as Baxter
- Rocco Sisto as Dr. Peters/Gunman
- Aliya Campbell as Mary
- David Gevedon as Jimmy Dimes
- Mike Hodge as Jules
- Priscilla Garita as Mugger/Secretary
- Michael P. Moran as Grady
- Jessica Blank as Saleslady/Carrie
- Dorian Missick as Rapper
- Marco St. John as Mr. Laurie

== See also ==
- List of American films of 2003
