= Jessica Blank =

American actress, writer, and director

- Occupations: Actress; playwright; novelist; director

Jessica Blank is an American actress, writer, and director who works in film, television, and theater. She is also a consultant and public speaker on story and social change.

== Career ==
=== Acting ===
As an actress, Blank appeared regularly in CBS' "Made in Jersey". She has also appeared on "Blue Bloods", "Elementary", "The Following", "The Mentalist", HBO's "High Maintenance", "Bored to Death", "Rescue Me", "Law and Order: Criminal Intent", "The Bronx Is Burning", and several other shows. In film, she has appeared in The Namesake, Slender Man, The Exonerated, and You're Nobody 'til Somebody Kills You, and over a dozen indies including "Creative Control" (Grand Jury Prize, SXSW 2015) and "On the Road With Judas" (Sundance). She has acted in theaters throughout New York City. In 2015 she played the role of Heather Drake in the 16th episode of the fifth season of the CBS police procedural drama Blue Bloods on the episode "In The Box"

=== Play writing and directing ===
Blank and Erik Jensen co-wrote The Exonerated, a play based on interviews they conducted with more than 40 exonerated death row inmates. In spring 2002, they co-directed The Exonerated at The Actors' Gang Theater. That production was nominated for five Ovation Awards and three NAACP Awards, won the Ovation for Best World Premiere Play, and has toured universities nationally. The New York production of The Exonerated ran for more than 600 performances off-Broadway, toured nationally, and won the Outer Critics Circle, Lortel, and Drama Desk awards, as well as awards from Amnesty International, American Bar Association, National Association of Criminal Defense Lawyers, and more. It was adapted as a movie for Court TV starring Brian Dennehy, Danny Glover, Delroy Lindo, Aidan Quinn, and Susan Sarandon. The play has been produced internationally in Dublin, Edinburgh, and London, in the United Kingdom; and in Japan, Mexico, France, China, Thailand, Iran, and Italy. It has been translated into French, Spanish, Italian, Mandarin, and Japanese. Blank and Jensen's book Living Justice (2005), a memoir about the making of "The Exonerated", was published by Simon & Schuster.

Blank and Jensen also co-wrote the documentary play Aftermath, based on interviews they conducted in 2008 with Iraqi civilian refugees in Jordan. Blank directed Aftermath off-Broadway at the New York Theatre Workshop; it was nominated for Drama League Awards and toured internationally for two years. They have a new documentary play under commission at The Public Theater with original music by Grammy-winning songwriter Steve Earle.

Their play, "How To Be A Rock Critic" (based on the writings of Lester Bangs), received a commission from Center Theatre Group and was produced at the Kirk Douglas Theater, South Coast Repertory, ArtsEmerson, Steppenwolf Theatre Company, and Off-Broadway at The Public Theater, with Jensen starring and Blank directing. They are at work on a new documentary play, under commission from the Public Theater, in collaboration with the Grammy Award-winning musician Steve Earle entitled Coal Country at the Cherry Lane Theatre in New York City.

"Liberty City," a play co-written by Blank and April Yvette Thompson, was produced Off-Broadway by New York Theatre Workshop in 2008, with Blank directing. It has toured to Miami and elsewhere. It was nominated for Lucille Lortel, Drama Desk, and Outer Critics Circle awards, and won Chicago's Jeff award in 2015.

Blank and Jensen wrote "The Line" in 2020, which tells the story about New York City health-care workers fighting against COVID-19. The one-hour documentary-style production was directed by Blank, produced and presented by the Public, and streamed on YouTube until September 1, 2020.

=== Other work ===
Blank's novel, Almost Home, was published in October 2007 by Hyperion. In 2016, Almost Home was made into a feature film, adapted and directed by Blank and Jensen.

Her second novel, Karma For Beginners, was published by Hyperion in 2009.

Her third novel, Legacy, was published by Penguin in 2018. Her writing has also been published in magazines and journals including The Believer, The Dramatist, Another Magazine, and Theatre History Studies.

Blank is also a coach for professional writers, a professor at Juilliard School, and a consultant and frequent speaker on story, neuroscience and social change. Blank writes for television with Erik Jensen. In 2015, she wrote a pilot for "The Negotiator" for Gaumont International Television.

== Filmography ==
=== Film ===
Year	Title	Role	Notes
2003	Undermind	Saleslady / Carrie	
2006	The Namesake	Edith	
2007	On the Road with Judas	Choreographer	
2012	You're Nobody 'til Somebody Kills You	Felicia Roman	
2015	Creative Control	Lucy	
2015	#Horror	Mom	
2016	Casanova Was a Woman	Dr. Weinstein	
2016	C Street	Senator Huxter	
2017	Police State	Beat Cop Davidson	
2018	After Everything	Monica	
2018	Slender Man	Hallie's Mother	
2018	Wetware	Virginia	

=== Television ===
Year	Title	Role	Notes
2004	One Life to Live	Mary Barnes	Episode #1.9195
2004	Rescue Me	Gloria	Episode: "Inches"
2004, 2007	Guiding Light	Krista / Noelle	2 episodes
2005	The Exonerated	Paula	Television film
2006	Law & Order: Criminal Intent	Sheila Dwyer	Episode: "Proud Flesh"
2007	The Bronx Is Burning	Darcy	Episode: "Past Combatants"
2009	Bored to Death	Miriam Thompson	Episode: "The Case of the Missing Screenplay"
2012	Made in Jersey	Deb Garretti Keenan	6 episodes
2013	The Happy Mommy Hustle	Katie	Episode: "ADHD"
2013	The Mentalist	Carol Mathews	Episode: "Black-Winged Redbird"
2014	Good Medicine	Tina	5 episodes
2015	Elementary	Tabitha Laird	Episode: "The One That Got Away"
2015	Blue Bloods	Heather Drake	Episode: "In the Box"
2015	The Following	Dr. Ann York	Episode: "Flesh & Blood"
2016	High Maintenance	Tali	Episode: "Tick"
2017	Shelter	Sarah Masters	Television film
2020	For Life	Kathy O'Reilly	Episode: "Witness"
2020	Ramy	Mary	Episode: "Bay'ah"
2021	Prodigal Son	Greta Swann	Episode: "Head Case"
