= Double Shot (record label) =

- Parent company: Double Shot Records Inc.
- Founded: 1966
- Founder: Hal Winn
- Distributor: Various
- Country of origin: United States
- Location: 6515 Sunset Boulevard, Hollywood California

Double Shot was an independent record label in the United States that was founded in 1966. Artists that recorded for the label include Count Five, Floyd and Jerry, Bobby Freeman, Kent & The Candidates, Señor Soul, Shirley & Shep, The Vanguards, Brenton Wood, and The Youngfolk.

== Background ==
The label was owned by Hal Winn and Joe Hooven. They were also the label's producers. The vice-president for the label was Irwin Zucker.

Their headquarters were located at 6515 Sunset Boulevard, Hollywood California.

== History ==
It was reported by Record World in the magazine's August 6, 1966, issue that Double Shot, a new label, had rejected twelve offers from major record companies for a hot record they had on their label. They decided to take care of the national business of the Count Five hit, "Psychotic Reaction" themselves.

It was reported in the April 15, 1967, issue of Record World that Brenton Wood's single "The Oogum Boogum Song" having broken as an r&b hit was now in the National Top 40. The label was also getting ready with a release by the Count Five with "You Must Believe Me". The Count Five's single which was a Curtis Mayfield cover had been reviewed earlier by Record World and was a four star pick. Also that year, Señor Soul signed to the label after Chuck Miller the founder of the group came into the label's office touting the band.

It was reported in the June 28, 1969, issue of Billboard that Irwin Zucker the vice president of the label had embarked on a 15-city tour promotion campaign for artists on the Double Shot label. They were Bobby Freeman, Brenton Wood, Count Five, Georgia Prophets and Bagdads. The campaign also included acts Señor Soul and The Vanguards which were on Double Shot's subsidiary, the Wizz label. Unfortunately for Zucker, on June 17, he was injured in a head on automobile collision whilst on the first leg of his tour. He suffered head injuries. With him was Stan Daniels, Promotion Manager of Record Sales Dist. Daniels the driver also suffered leg injuries. Later while resting in his hotel room, Zucker couldn't confirm at the time if he would continue the tour. He did comment on the need to use seat belts.

Following the success of "Pata Pata", Señor Soul were doing well with their release "I Ain't Got No Soul Today". At least one member of the group would go on to be a member of the group War.

The label continued releasing recordings up until 1972.

== Later years ==
A 26-track compilation of songs from the label was released in 2004. The compilation Double Shot Of Soul was released on Kent CDKEND 238.
