= The Oogum Boogum Song =

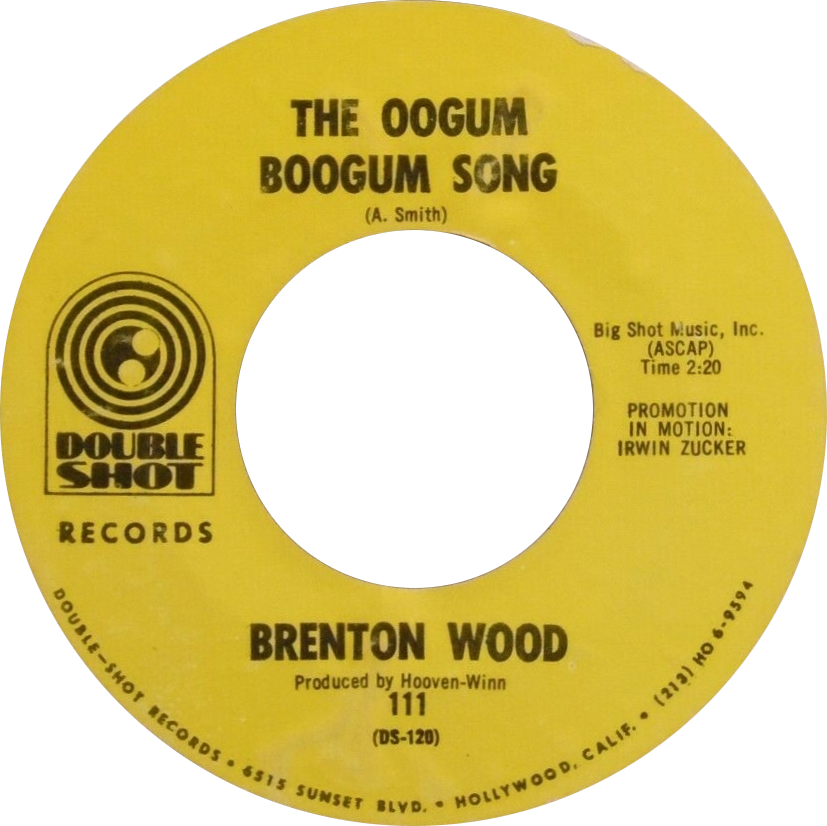
- Side A of the US single

Single by Brenton Wood

from the album Oogum Boogum
- B-side: "I Like the Way You Love Me"
- Released: April 1967
- Genre: Soul; R&B
- Length: 2:19
- Label: Double Shot
- Songwriter: Alfred Smith
- Producers: Joe Hooven, Jerry Winn

Brenton Wood singles chronology
"The Oogum Boogum Song" (1967)	"Gimme Little Sign" (1967)

"The Oogum Boogum Song" is a song by the American R&B musician Brenton Wood. It was released in 1967 on the album Oogum Boogum. It was written by Wood (under his real name, Alfred Smith).

== History ==
The song peaked at number 34 in the US Billboard Hot 100 chart the week of June 24, 1967 and number 19 R&B. It was also a hit on the Canadian R&B chart, where it reached number 9.

== Chart performance ==
Chart (1967)	Peak position
Canada Top Singles (RPM)	31
Canada Top R&B Singles (RPM)	6
US Billboard Hot 100	34
US Hot R&B Singles (Billboard)	19
US Cash Box Top 100	43
