= 'Til the Day I Started Lovin' You =

1979 single by Dalton & Dubarri

Single by Dalton & Dubarri

from the album Choice
- B-side: "Keepin' It Up"
- Released: 1979
- Genre: Soul, disco, pop
- Length: 3:45
- Label: Hilltak HT 7902
- Songwriter(s): G. Dalton & K. Dubarri
- Producer(s): Gary Dalton & Kent Dubarri

Dalton & Dubarri singles chronology
"I (You) Can Dance All By My (Your) Self" (1979)	"'Til the Day I Started Lovin' You" (1979)	"Flyin' Free" (1979)

"'Til the Day I Started Lovin' You" was a hit for Dalton & Dubarri in 1979. It was the follow-up to their hit, "I (You) Can Dance All By My (Your) Self".

== Background ==
The song is taken from Dalton & Dubarri's 1979 album Choice which was released on Hilltak Records HT 1102. It was written and produced by Dalton and Dubarri. The single cat#PW 7902 is backed with "Keepin' It Up". It appears on the 1994 Valley Vue various artist compilation, Soul Searchin' . They followed up with "Flyin' Free".

== Chart performance ==
"'Til the Day I Started Lovin' You" reached No. 76 on the Billboard R&B singles chart in September 1979, spending five weeks on the chart.

=== Charts ===
Chart (1979)	Peak position
US Hot Soul Singles (Billboard)	76
