= Almost Home (novel) =

2007 novel by Jessica Blank

- Author: Jessica Blank
- Cover artist: Elizabeth H. Clark
- Language: English
- Genre: Fiction
- Set in: Los Angeles, California
- Publisher: Hyperion, Little, Brown Books for Young Readers
- Publication date: October 23, 2007
- Publication place: United States
- Media type: Print
- Pages: 256
- ISBN: 978-1-4231-4346-8
- OCLC: 154698550
- LC Class: PZ7.B61313

Almost Home is a novel by American author Jessica Blank published in October 2007 by Hyperion. Almost Home deals with the subject of runaway youth through the lives of seven homeless teenagers.

In September 2007, the film rights to Almost Home were initially optioned by Jon Bon Jovi and his producing partners Jack Rovner and Ken Levitan, but now the new producer is Axl Rose from the band Guns N' Roses. Jessica Blank and Erik Jensen will adapt the screenplay.
