= I (You) Can Dance All By My (Your) Self =

1979 single by MDalton & Dubarri

Single by Dalton & Dubarri

from the album Choice
- B-side: "Keepin' It Up"
- Released: 1979
- Genre: Soul, disco, pop
- Length: 3:20
- Label: Hilltak HT 7806
- Songwriters: G. Dalton & K. Dubarri
- Producers: Gary Dalton & Kent Dubarri

Dalton & Dubarri singles chronology
"Cold Outside Your Love" (1976)	"I (You) Can Dance All By My (Your) Self" (1979)	"'Til the Day I Started Lovin' You" (1979)

"I (You) Can Dance All by My (Your) Self" or "I Can Dance All by Myself" was a hit for US duo Dalton & Dubarri in 1979. A disco song, it was released on the Hilltak label and later on the DJM label.

== Background ==
Dalton & Dubarri recorded the album Choice which was released by Hilltak in 1979. The album included "I Can Dance All by Myself". The single's mixing was overseen by Issy Sanchez, A&R coordinator and National director of Disco promotion for Atlantic. On May 5, 1979, it was a recommended soul song on Billboard's Top Single Picks. With the B side, "Keepin' It Up", it was released on Hilltak HT 7806.

The song was in the May 5, 1979, Cash Box Singles to Watch section. With its narrative at the beginning, pumping and infectious disco beat, it was described as suitable for disco and a variety of dance formats. With the lone raspy vocal line, bell and siren sound effects, Record World called it an immediate attention grabber.

== Chart performance ==
For the week of May 26, 1979, the single entered the Record World Singles 101 to 150 chart at No. 131. On June 23, at its fourth week in the Cash Box chart, it peaked at No. 73., and moved up from No. 124 to 123 on the Record World Singles 101 to 150 Chart. From May 31 to June 14, it held its peak position at number 138 on the Radio Report MS Survey chart. It also made #79 on the Billboard Hot Soul Singles chart on June 30.

=== Charts ===
Chart (1979)	Peak position
US Hot Soul Singles (Billboard)	79
US Cash Box Top 100	73
US Record World Singles	123
Radio Report MAS Survey Songs	138
