= Motorcycle Mama =

Single by Sailcat

from the album Motorcycle Mama
- B-side: "Rainbow Road"
- Released: April 1972
- Genre: Country rock
- Length: 2:07
- Label: Elektra
- Songwriter(s): John Wyker
- Producer(s): Pete Carr

Sailcat singles chronology
"Motorcycle Mama" (1972)	"Baby Ruth" (1972)

"Motorcycle Mama" is a song written by John Wyker and performed by Sailcat. It reached #12 on both the U.S. pop chart and the U.S. adult contemporary chart in 1972 and was featured on their 1972 album Motorcycle Mama.

Produced by Pete Carr, the song ranked #89 on Billboard magazine's Top 100 singles of 1972.

== Charts ==
Chart (1971)	Peak position
Australia (Kent Music Report)	64
Canada (RPM)	14
United States (Billboard Hot 100)	12

== Other versions ==
- The Sugarcubes, on the 1990 compilation album Rubáiyát: Elektra's 40th Anniversary.
