= Brenton Wood =

American singer and songwriter (1941–2025)

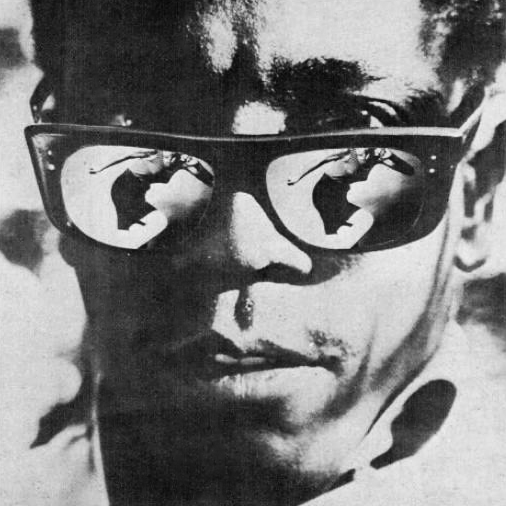
- 1967 promo image of Wood for "The Oogum Boogum Song"

Background information
- Born: Alfred Jesse Smith; July 26, 1941; Shreveport, Louisiana, U.S.
- Origin: San Pedro, California, U.S.
- Died: January 3, 2025 (aged 83) Moreno Valley, California, U.S.
- Genres: Soul; R&B; pop
- Occupation: Singer-songwriter
- Instruments: Vocals; keyboards
- Years active: 1963–2024

Alfred Jesse Smith (July 26, 1941 – January 3, 2025), known professionally as Brenton Wood, was an American singer and songwriter. Three 1967 singles of Wood's, "The Oogum Boogum Song" (peaking at No. 34 on the US Billboard Hot 100), "Gimme Little Sign" (reached No. 9), and "Baby You Got It" (also peaking at No. 34) were hits.

== Early life and education ==
Alfred Jesse Smith was born in Shreveport in northwest Louisiana on July 26, 1941. The family moved to San Pedro in Los Angeles when Smith was a child. He attended San Pedro High School for part of his first year of high school and then moved to Compton, where he became a member of the Compton High School track team and received several awards for his athletic achievements.

After graduating, Smith enrolled in East Los Angeles College. Soon after, he took the stage name of Brenton Wood, possibly inspired by the Brentwood neighborhood of Los Angeles. He was influenced by Jesse Belvin's and Sam Cooke's music. He began writing while also becoming a pianist.

== Career ==
=== 1960s ===
Wood's novelty song "The Oogum Boogum Song" was released on Double Shot Records, and reached No. 19 on the US Billboard R&B chart and No. 34 on the Billboard Hot 100 in the spring of 1967. Wood's biggest hit came a few months later, as "Gimme Little Sign" hit No. 9 on the pop chart, No. 19 on the R&B charts and No. 8 in the UK Singles Chart. The record sold over one million copies and was awarded a gold disc. Wood's "Baby You Got It" (1967) peaked at No. 34 on the Hot 100 during the last week of 1967. His backing band during the 1960s was the LA-based Kent and The Candidates, which was led by drummer Kent Sprague. They also recorded several singles for the Double Shot label.

=== 1970s ===
In 1972, Wood formed his own record label and released, co-produced and co-wrote the track "Sticky Boom Boom [Too Cold] Part I and II" with collaborators George Semper (co-producer, arranger) and Al McKay (co-writer, performer) of Earth, Wind & Fire fame. Wood also recorded a duet with Shirley Goodman.

Wood recorded the single "Rainin' Love (You Gotta Feel It)" which was released on Midget M-101 in 1975. Along with "Bump Me Baby" by Dooley Silverspoon, "The Mighty Clouds of Joy" by Mighty Clouds of Joy, "Come on Down (Get Your Head Out of the Clouds)" by Greg Perry, and others, "Rainin' Love (You Gotta Feel It)" was listed by Cash Box magazine as a Newcomer Pick and the magazine positively reviewed the song, predicting it would cause a stir. Wood's next song on the charts was "Come Softly to Me" in 1977.

=== 1980s and beyond ===
Wood returned in 1986 with the album Out of the Woodwork, which included contemporary re-recordings of his early hits, along with several new tracks, including the single, "Soothe Me". His album This Love Is for Real was released in 2001. Among his later appearances was in 2006 on the Los Angeles public access program Thee Mr. Duran Show, where Wood and his band performed several of his hit singles.

In 2014, he partnered with William Pilgrim & The All Grows Up for a remake of the song "Gimme Little Sign" on their album, Epic Endings.

In 2024, Wood announced his farewell tour Catch You On The Rebound: The Last Tour. He was hospitalized in May 2024, pausing his farewell tour.

He died at his home in Moreno Valley, California, on January 3, 2025, at the age of 83.

In September 2025, Wood was selected for induction into the National Rhythm and Blues Hall of Fame.

== Discography ==
=== Albums ===
Studio

- Oogum Boogum (1967) – (Double Shot) – Billboard Hot 200 No. 184
- Gimme Little Sign (1967) – (Liberty) – 'UK version of Oogum Boogum '
- Baby You Got It (1967)
- Come Softly (1977) – (Cream)
- Out of the Woodwork (1986) – (Golden Oldies)
- Sweet Old School (1995)
- Classic By Design (2000)
- This Love Is for Real (2001)
- Lord Hear My Prayer (2009)

Compilations

- Brenton Wood's 18 Best (1991)
- 18 More of the Best, Vol. 2 (1999)
- Better Believe It (2000) – (Demon / Westside)

=== Singles ===
- "Kangaroo" (1960)
- "Hide-a-Way" (1963)
- "I Want Love" (1966) (his name appears as "Breton Wood")
- "Sweet Molly Malone" (1966)
- "The Oogum Boogum Song" (1967) – US Billboard Hot 100 No. 34; US R&B No. 19; CAN RPM Top 100 No. 31; CAN RPM Top R&B No. 6;
- "Gimme Little Sign" (1967) – US Billboard Hot 100 No. 9; US R&B No. 19; UK Singles Chart No. 8; CAN RPM Top 100 No. 17
- "Baby You Got It" (1967) – US Billboard Hot 100 No. 34; US R&B No. 30; CAN RPM Top R&B No. 16
- "Lovey Dovey Kinda Lovin'" (1968) – US Billboard Hot 100 No. 99
- "Some Got It, Some Don't" (1968) – US Billboard R&B No. 42
- "Kid Games And Nursery Rhymes" (1968)
- "It's Just a Game, Love" (1968)
- "Il treno" (1969) (sung in Italian - Italy only)
- "A Change Is Gonna Come" (1969) – US Billboard "Bubbling Under" No. 131
- "Il tuo ritorno" (1969) (sung in Italian - Italy only)
- "Whoop It On Me" (1969)
- "Great Big Bundle of Love" (1970)
- "Boogaloosa Louisian'" (1970)
- "Sad Little Song" (1971)
- "Sticky Boom Boom (Too Cold)" (1972)
- "You're Beautiful People" (1973)
- "Another Saturday Night" (1973)
- "All That Jazz" (1975)
- "Rainin' Love (You Gotta Feel It)" (1975)
- "It Only Make Me Want It More" (1975)
- "Bless Your Little Heart" (1976)
- "Come Softly To Me" (1977) – US R&B No. 92
- "Number One" (1977)
- "Let's Get Crazy Together" (1978)
- "Me And You"/"Soothe Me" (1986)

== Filmography ==
- Popdown – (1967) – Wood appeared in the movie, alongside Julie Driscoll, Zoot Money, Andy Summers, Don Partridge, and Tony Hicks.

== See also ==
- List of performers on Top of the Pops
- List of soul musicians
