= Sailcat =

American rock band

Sailcat was an American rock band that was signed with Elektra Records in the early 1970s, and best known for the hit song "Motorcycle Mama".

== History ==
=== Creation of the band ===
The band, an early Southern pop/rock setup, was the innovation of John D. Wyker (March 14, 1945 – December 8, 2013) and Court Pickett, who formed the group in 1971 near Decatur, Alabama. Wyker was a veteran of the Muscle Shoals, Alabama, rock music scene who had been in The Rubber Band with John Townsend (later of the Sanford-Townsend Band). Pickett was the vocalist and bass player from Tuscaloosa, Alabama, who had just moved from Macon, Georgia, where he had been playing and singing for Sundown, a band that also had Chuck Leavell (later of the Rolling Stones and the Allman Brothers), Charlie Hayward (of the Charlie Daniels Band), and Lou Mullenix (from the Alex Taylor Band and Dr. John). Court was also the brother of Ed Pickett of The Rubber Band. In the 1960s, Ed played with other musicians in Granny's Gremlins in Tuscaloosa, Alabama; that included Hal Holbrook, Marvin Rust, and Bruce Stewart.

=== "Motorcycle Mama" success, and their breakup ===
An early demo tape of an album, cut by the duo (and including the song "Motorcycle Mama"), was initially discarded by the band but, after it was presented to Elektra Records, led to a recording contract and 1972 album release also titled Motorcycle Mama. The resulting album, produced by Pete Carr, was a concept album with a biker theme. The cover art and drawings inside the gatefold cover were drawn by Jack Davis, featuring a Triumph Tiger Trail motorcycle (although the lyrics of Motorcycle Mama mention a Harley-Davidson). There is one drawing for each song on the album, plus an extra one at the end. The concept album's songs loosely tell the story of a motorcycle vagrant who apparently bums for a living, meeting a woman and settling down to start a family. However, he apparently keeps some of his selfish lazy behavior, as the last drawing shows him reclining on his porch, while his wife hangs the laundry and his child hoes the garden.

In 1972, the single "Motorcycle Mama" hit number 12 on the Billboard singles chart, and the album went to number 38 and led them to appearances on American Bandstand and at Carnegie Hall. In Canada, the single reached number 14. John D. Wyker and Sailcat performed both "Motorcycle Mama" and "Walking Together Backwards" on their first televised appearance on August 26, 1972. Sailcat toured to promote the album and released two more non-LP singles, "Baby Ruth" and "She Showed Me" / "Sweet Little Jenny". However, soon after releasing the album, the band broke up. (The album was officially re-released on CD in 2004.)

=== After the breakup ===
Sailcat leader Wyker, who had been a member of the Rubber Band who recorded the original version of "Let Love Come Between Us" (later a hit for James & Bobby Purify), went on to play with many of the great Southern rock musicians like Eddie Hinton, Dan Penn, Delaney Bramlett, among others.

Wyker was married to Margaret Young Wyker in 1988. Wyker worked on a benefit project called The Mighty Field of Vision, a group dedicated to raising funds for musicians who have fallen on hard times. Wyker died at his home on December 8, 2013, at the age of 68.

As for Pickett, he later issued a solo album, Fancy Dancer, on the Elektra label in 1973.

== Tributes ==
On the 1990 Elektra compilation album Rubáiyát, the song "Motorcycle Mama" is covered by the band The Sugarcubes featuring Björk.

== Discography ==
=== Album ===
Motorcycle Mama (1972)

Motorcycle Mama

Studio album by Sailcat
- Released: May 1972
- Recorded: Between October 1971 and February 1972; Widget Recordings; Muscle Shoals, Alabama
- Genre: Southern rock, country blues
- Length: 33:22
- Label: Elektra
- Producer: Pete Carr

Professional ratings
Review scores
Source	Rating
Billboard	favorable

=== Track listing ===
==== Side one ====
1. "Rainbow Road" (John Wyker) - 4:00
2. "The Thief" (John Wyker) - 3:30
3. "Highway Rider/Highway Riff" (John Wyker, Clayton Ivey, Pete Carr) - 5:40
4. "The Dream" (Pete Carr) - 2:45

==== Side two ====
1. "If You've Got a Daughter" (John Wyker) - 1:33
2. "Ambush" (John Wyker, Clayton Ivey, Pete Carr) - 3:06
3. "B.B. Gunn" (John Wyker) - 2:48
4. "It'll Be a Long Long Time" (Pete Carr) - 2:12
5. "Motorcycle Mama" (John Wyker) - 2:06
6. "Walking Together Backwards" (John Wyker) - 3:19
7. "On the Brighter Side of It All" (John Wyker) - 2:23

=== Album production credits ===
- Robert L. Heimall - art direction, design
- Faye Sanders (tracks: B1, B6, B7), Laura Struzick (tracks: B6, B7), Terry Woodward (tracks: B1, B6, B7) - backing vocals
- Tom Russell - banjo
- Bob Wray, Court Pickett - bass
- John Wyker - concept
- Fred Prouty, Lou Mullenix - drums
- Al Lester, Scott Boyer - fiddle
- Joe Rudd, John Wyker, Pete Carr - guitar
- The Memphis Horns (Andrew Love, Ed Logan, Jack Hale, James Mitchell, Wayne Jackson - horns
- Jack Davis - illustration
- Art Schilling, Chuck Leavell, Clayton Ivey - keyboards
- Bill Connell - extra percussion
- Frank Bez - photography
- Pete Carr - producer, remix engineer
- Brenda Hagan, Marlin Greene - sound effects
- Jesse Gorell - spoons, buck dancing etc.
- Charles Chalmers - strings
- Court Pickett (tracks: A2, A3, A4, B1 B4, B5), John Wyker (tracks: A1, A3, B3, B5 to B7) - vocals

== Chart positions ==
=== Album ===
Year	Title	Peak chart positions			Label
Year	Title	US Top 200	US CB Top 100	Can Top 100	Label
1972	Motorcycle Mama	38	48	46	Elektra

=== Singles ===
Year	Title (A-Side)	US Billboard Hot 100	AUS	Canada	Label
1972	"Motorcycle Mama"	12	64	14	Elektra
1972	"Baby Ruth"	—	—	—	Elektra
1973	"She Showed Me"	115	—	—	Elektra

(The latter two singles were non-album cuts.)

== See also ==
- Muscle Shoals, Alabama
- The gafftopsail catfish, known as the sailcat or sail cat
