= Lester Bangs =

American music critic (1948–1982)

- Bangs photographed by Roberta Bayley in 1976
- Born: Leslie Conway Bangs; December 14, 1948; Escondido, California, U.S.
- Died: April 30, 1982 (aged 33); New York City, U.S.
- Occupations: Music journalist; music critic; musician; author
- Writing career
- Period: 1969–1982
- Subjects: Rock music, jazz

Leslie Conway "Lester" Bangs (December 14, 1948 – April 30, 1982) was an American music journalist and critic. He wrote for Creem and Rolling Stone and was also a performing musician. The music critic Jim DeRogatis called him "America's greatest rock critic".

== Early life ==
Bangs was born in Escondido, California. He was the son of Norma Belle (née Clifton) and Conway Leslie Bangs, a truck driver. Both of his parents were from Texas: his father from Enloe and his mother from Pecos County. Norma Belle was a devout Jehovah's Witness. Conway died in a fire when his son was young. When Bangs was 11, he moved with his mother to El Cajon, also in San Diego County.

His early interests and influences ranged from the Beat Generation (particularly William S. Burroughs) and jazz musicians John Coltrane and Miles Davis, to comic books and science fiction. He met Cameron Crowe while they were both contributing music pieces to The San Diego Door, an underground newspaper of the late 1960s.

== Career ==
=== Rolling Stone magazine ===
Bangs became a freelance writer in 1969, after reading an ad in Rolling Stone soliciting readers' reviews. His first accepted piece was a negative review of the MC5 album Kick Out the Jams, which he sent to Rolling Stone with a note requesting, if the magazine were to decline to publish the review, that he be given a reason for the decision; no reply was forthcoming, as the magazine did indeed publish the review.

His 1970 review of Black Sabbath's first album in Rolling Stone was scathing, rating them as imitators of the band Cream:

Cream clichés that sound like the musicians learned them out of a book, grinding on and on with dogged persistence. Vocals are sparse, most of the album being filled with plodding bass lines over which the lead guitar dribbles wooden Claptonisms from the master's tiredest Cream days. They even have discordant jams with bass and guitar reeling like velocitized speedfreaks all over each other's musical perimeters yet never quite finding synch—just like Cream! But worse.

Bangs wrote about the death of Janis Joplin in 1970 from a drug overdose: "It's not just that this kind of early death has become a fact of life that has become disturbing, but that it's been accepted as a given so quickly."

In 1973, Jann Wenner fired Bangs from Rolling Stone for "disrespecting musicians" after a particularly harsh review of the group Canned Heat.

=== Creem magazine ===
Bangs began freelancing for Detroit-based Creem in 1970. In 1971, he wrote a feature for Creem on Alice Cooper, and soon afterward he moved to Detroit. Named Creem's editor in 1971, Bangs fell in love with Detroit, calling it "rock's only hope", and remained there for five years.

During the early 1970s, Bangs and some other writers at Creem began using the term punk rock to designate the genre of 1960s garage bands and more contemporary acts, such as MC5 and Iggy and the Stooges. Their writings provided some of the conceptual framework for the later punk and new wave movements that emerged in New York, London, and elsewhere later in the decade. They were quick to pick up on these new movements and provide extensive coverage of the phenomenon. Bangs was enamored of the noise music of Lou Reed, and Creem gave exposure to artists such as Reed, David Bowie, Roxy Music, Captain Beefheart, Blondie, Brian Eno, and the New York Dolls years earlier than the mainstream press. Bangs wrote the essay/interview "Let Us Now Praise Famous Death Dwarves" about Reed in 1975.

=== Subsequent career ===
After leaving Creem in 1976, he wrote for The Village Voice, Penthouse, Playboy, New Musical Express, and many other publications. He was nominated for a posthumous Grammy Award for Best Album Notes in 1984 for his liner notes on The Fugs Greatest Hits, Volume 1.

== Death ==
Bangs died in New York City on April 30, 1982, at the age of 33; he was self-medicating a bad case of the flu and accidentally overdosed on dextropropoxyphene (an opioid analgesic), diazepam (a benzodiazepine), and NyQuil. Dextropropoxyphene was later prohibited in the United States and much of Europe due to concerns about overdose and heart arrhythmia.

Bangs appeared to be listening to music when he died. Earlier that day, he had bought a copy of Dare by English synth-pop band the Human League. Later that night, a friend found him lying on a couch in his apartment, unresponsive. "Dare was spinning on the turntable, and the needle was stuck on the end groove", Jim DeRogatis wrote in Let It Blurt, his biography of Bangs.

== Writing style and cultural commentary ==
Bangs's criticism was filled with cultural references, not only to rock music but also to literature and philosophy. His radical and confrontational style influenced others in the punk rock and related social and political movements. In a 1982 interview, he said:

Well, basically, I just started out to lead [an interview] with the most insulting question I could think of. Because it seemed to me that the whole thing of interviewing as far as rock stars and that was just such a suck-up. It was groveling obeisance to people who weren't that special, really. It's just a guy, just another person, so what?

In 1979, writing for The Village Voice, Bangs wrote a piece about racism in the punk music scene, called "The White Noise Supremacists", wherein he re-examined his own actions and words, and those of his peers, in light of some bands using Nazi symbolism, and other racist speech and imagery, "for shock value". He came to the conclusion that generating outrage for attention was not worth the harm it was causing fellow members of the community, and expressed his personal shame and embarrassment about having engaged in these racist behaviors himself. He praised the efforts of activist groups like Rock Against Racism and Rock Against Sexism as "an attempt at simple decency by a lot of people whom one would think too young and naive to begin to appreciate the contradictions."

== Music ==
Bangs was also a musician. In 1976, he and Peter Laughner recorded an acoustic improvisation in the Creem office. The recording included covers/parodies of songs like "Sister Ray" and "Pale Blue Eyes", both by the Velvet Underground.

In 1977, Bangs recorded, as a solo artist, a 7" vinyl single named "Let It Blurt/Live", mixed by John Cale and released in 1979.

In 1977, at the New York City nightclub CBGB, Bangs and guitarist Mickey Leigh, Joey Ramone's brother, decided to form a band named "Birdland". Although they both had their roots in jazz, the two wanted to create an old-school rock-and-roll group. Leigh brought in his post-punk band, The Rattlers (David Merrill on bass; Matty Quick on drums). On April Fool's Day 1979, the band snuck into Electric Lady Studios for an impromptu late-night recording session; the studio was under renovation but Merrill was helping and had the key. Birdland broke up within two months of the recording. The cassette tape from the session became the master, mixed by Ed Stasium and released by Leigh in 1986 as "Birdland" with Lester Bangs. In a review of the album, Robert Christgau gave it a B-plus and said, "musically he always had the instincts, and words were no problem."

He also appeared on stage with others at times. On one occasion, while the J. Geils Band were playing in concert, Bangs climbed onto the stage, typewriter in hand, and proceeded to type a supposed review of the event, in full view of the audience, banging the keys in rhythm with the music.

In 1980, Bangs traveled to Austin, Texas, where he met a surf/punk rock group, The Delinquents. In early December of the same year, they recorded an album as "Lester Bangs and the Delinquents", titled Jook Savages on the Brazos, released the following year.

In 1990, the Mekons released the EP F.U.N. 90 with Bangs's declamation in the song "One Horse Town".

== In popular culture ==
- Bangs is mentioned in the R.E.M. single "It's the End of the World as We Know It" from their 1987 album Document.
- Bangs is a character in the short story "Dori Bangs" by Bruce Sterling in which Sterling imagines what would have happened if Lester hadn't died young and had instead met the artist Dori Seda (who also died young).
- Bangs is the subject of the song by Scott B. Sympathy "Lester Bangs Stereo Ghost" on the 1992 album Drinking With The Poet.
- of Montreal mention Bangs in their 2003 song "There Is Nothing Wrong With Hating Rock Critics."
- Excerpts from an interview with Lester Bangs appeared in the last two episodes of Tony Palmer's 17-episode television documentary All You Need Is Love: The Story of Popular Music.
- The Ramones name-check Bangs in their 1981 song "It's Not My Place."
- In the 2000 movie Almost Famous, directed by Cameron Crowe (himself a former writer for Rolling Stone), Bangs is portrayed by actor Philip Seymour Hoffman as a mentor to the film's protagonist William Miller. Bangs is also a major character in the 2019 stage musical version, in which he was played by Rob Colletti.
- The title of Crowe's 2025 memoir, The Uncool, came from a conversation with Bangs. He told Crowe that he had gotten too close to the rock stars he covered. "You made friends with them. That was your mistake. They make you feel cool," Bangs said. "I met you. You are not cool." Later in the conversation, Bangs said he and Crowe were from San Diego so, "We're uncool!"
- The 2003 Buzzcocks song "Lester Sands" is a coded reference to Bangs. Written in the 1970s, it was re-recorded and released on the 2003 album Buzzcocks.
- In 2018 an Off-Broadway play about Bangs, How to Be a Rock Critic, premiered and was performed at several venues around the US. It starred Erik Jensen as Bangs, and was directed by Jessica Blank, with music by Steve Earle.
- Bangs is the subject of a track bearing his name, “Lester Bangs”, on Morrissey's 2026 album Make-Up is a Lie.

== Selected works ==
=== By Lester Bangs ===
- Review of the MC5's debut album, Kick Out the Jams — Bangs's first piece for Rolling Stone
- "How Long Will We Care?" Elvis Presley obituary. The Village Voice, August 29, 1977
- "The Greatest Album Ever Made", Creem magazine (1976) — about the 1975 Lou Reed album Metal Machine Music
- "Stranded", (1979) — about the 1968 album Astral Weeks, by Van Morrison
- Blondie, Fireside Book, 1980. ISBN 0-671-25540-1, 91 p.
- Rod Stewart, Paul Nelson & Lester Bangs, Putnam Group, 1981. ISBN 978-0-933328-08-2, 159 p.
- Psychotic Reactions and Carburetor Dung: The Work of a Legendary Critic, collected writings, Greil Marcus, ed. Anchor Press, 1987. (ISBN 0-679-72045-6)
- Main Lines, Blood Feasts, and Bad Taste: A Lester Bangs Reader, collected writings, John Morthland, ed. Anchor Press, 2003. (ISBN 0-375-71367-0)

=== About Lester Bangs ===
- Let It Blurt: The Life and Times of Lester Bangs, America's Greatest Rock Critic, biography, Jim Derogatis. Broadway Books, 2000. (ISBN 0-7679-0509-1).
- How to Be a Rock Critic, play, Jessica Blank and Erik Jensen. Kirk Douglas Theater, Steppenwolf Theatre Company, Public Theater, more; 2015–2018.

=== Works citing Lester Bangs ===
- Please Kill Me: The Uncensored Oral History of Punk, biography, Legs McNeil and Gillian McCain. Penguin Books, 1997. (ISBN 0-14-026690-9).

== See also ==
- Jeffrey Morgan
- Greil Marcus
- Dave Marsh
- Greg Shaw
- Lenny Kaye
- Robert Christgau
- Ellen Willis
- Lillian Roxon
