= List of songs written by Jimmy Jam and Terry Lewis =

This is a complete list of the songs known to have been written or co-written by Jimmy Jam and Terry Lewis.

Key
†	Indicates single release or single track

Songs written by James Harris III and Terry Lewis, with original artists, co-writers, the samples and originating album, showing year released.
Title	Artist(s)	Co-writer(s)	Originating album	Year	Sample(s)	Ref.
"High Hopes" †	The S.O.S. Band	—N/a	III	1982	—N/a	
"The Only One"	Dynasty	—N/a	Right Back at Cha!	1982	—N/a	
"Wild Girls"	Klymaxx	—N/a	Girls Will Be Girls	1982	—N/a	
"Can You Treat Me Like She Does?" †	Reel to Real	—N/a	—N/a	1983	—N/a	
"For Your Love"	The S.O.S. Band	—N/a	On the Rise	1983	—N/a	
"Just Be Good to Me" †	The S.O.S. Band	—N/a	On the Rise	1983	—N/a	
"Tell Me If You Still Care" †	The S.O.S. Band	—N/a	On the Rise	1983	—N/a	
"Encore" †	Cheryl Lynn	—N/a	Preppie	1983	—N/a	
"When You're Far Away"	Gladys Knight & the Pips	—N/a	Visions	1983	—N/a	
"No One's Gonna Love You" †	The S.O.S. Band	—N/a	Just the Way You Like It	1984	—N/a	
"Like I Will"	Cherrelle	—N/a	Fragile	1984	—N/a	
"You Used to Hold Me So Tight" †	Thelma Houston	—N/a	Qualifying Heat	1984	—N/a	
"I'd Rather Spend the Bad Times with You, Than the Good Times with Someone New" †	Thelma Houston	—N/a	Qualifying Heat	1984	—N/a	
"Who's It Gonna Be"	Cherrelle	—N/a	Fragile	1984	—N/a	
"Weekend Girl" †	The S.O.S. Band	—N/a	Just the Way You Like It	1984	—N/a	
"I Didn't Mean to Turn You On" †	Cherrelle	—N/a	Fragile	1984	—N/a	
"When You Look in My Eyes"	Cherrelle	—N/a	Fragile	1984	—N/a	
"Warm"	Change	—N/a	Change of Heart	1984	—N/a	
"Break Up"	The S.O.S. Band	—N/a	Just the Way You Like It	1984	—N/a	
"Fragile...Handle With Care" †	Cherrelle	—N/a	Fragile	1984	—N/a	
"Just the Way You Like It" †	The S.O.S. Band	—N/a	Just the Way You Like It	1984	—N/a	
"Change of Heart" †	Change	—N/a	Change of Heart	1984	—N/a	
"Say You Love Me Again" †	Change	—N/a	Change of Heart	1984	—N/a	
"You Were Meant to Be My Lady (Not My Girl)" †	Alexander O'Neal	—N/a	Alexander O'Neal	1985	—N/a	
"What's Missing" †	Alexander O'Neal	—N/a	Alexander O'Neal	1985	—N/a	
"The Heat of Heat" †	Patti Austin	—N/a	Gettin' Away with Murder	1985	—N/a	
"Summer Is the Coldest Time of Year"	Patti Austin	—N/a	Gettin' Away with Murder	1985	—N/a	
"Saturday Love" †	Cherrelle and Alexander O'Neal	—N/a	High Priority	1985	—N/a	
"Tender Love" †	Force M.D.'s	—N/a	Chillin'	1985	—N/a	
"Fidelity" †	Cheryl Lynn	—N/a	It's Gonna Be Right	1985	—N/a	
"It's Gonna Be Right" †	Cheryl Lynn	—N/a	It's Gonna Be Right	1985	—N/a	
"New Love"	Cherrelle	—N/a	High Priority	1985	—N/a	
"Artificial Heart" †	Cherrelle	—N/a	High Priority	1985	—N/a	
"Innocent"/"Alex 9000"/"Innocent II" †	Alexander O'Neal	—N/a	Alexander O'Neal	1985	—N/a	
"A Broken Heart Can Mend" †	Alexander O'Neal	—N/a	Alexander O'Neal	1985	—N/a	
"You Look Good to Me" †	Cherrelle	—N/a	High Priority	1985	—N/a	
"Will You Satisfy" †	Cherrelle	—N/a	High Priority	1985	—N/a	
"When I Think of You" †	Janet Jackson	Janet Jackson	Control	1986	—N/a	
"Funny How Time Flies (When You're Having Fun)" †	Janet Jackson	Janet Jackson	Control	1986	—N/a	
"Even When You Sleep" †	The S.O.S. Band	—N/a	Sands of Time	1986	—N/a	
"No Lies" †	The S.O.S. Band	—N/a	Sands of Time	1986	—N/a	
"Love Is All That Matters" †	The Human League	—N/a	Crash	1986	—N/a	
"Nothing But the Best"	The S.O.S. Band	—N/a	Sands of Time	1986	—N/a	
"Nasty" †	Janet Jackson	Janet Jackson	Control	1986	—N/a	
"The Finest" †	The S.O.S. Band (featuring Alexander O'Neal)	—N/a	Sands of Time	1986	—N/a	
"Control" †	Janet Jackson	Janet Jackson	Control	1986	—N/a	
"Let's Wait Awhile" †	Janet Jackson	Janet Jackson; Melanie Andrews	Control	1986	—N/a	
"Sands of Time"	The S.O.S. Band	—N/a	Sands of Time	1986	—N/a	
"Human" †	The Human League	—N/a	Crash	1986	—N/a	
"I Need Your Loving" †	The Human League	Danny Williams; David Eiland; Langston Richey; H. Randall Davis	Crash	1986	—N/a	
"You Can Be Mine"	Janet Jackson	Janet Jackson	Control	1986	—N/a	
"Borrowed Love" †	The S.O.S. Band	—N/a	Sands of Time	1986	—N/a	
"What Have You Done for Me Lately" †	Janet Jackson	Janet Jackson	Control	1986	—N/a	
"Crying Overtime"	Alexander O'Neal	—N/a	Hearsay	1987	—N/a	
"Hearsay" †	Alexander O'Neal	—N/a	Hearsay	1987	—N/a	
"Fishnet" †	Morris Day	—N/a	Daydreaming	1987	—N/a	
"Just the Facts" †	Patti LaBelle	—N/a	Dragnet OST	1987	—N/a	
"Love Is a Game" †	Morris Day	—N/a	Daydreaming	1987	—N/a	
"Helplessly in Love"	New Edition	—N/a	Dragnet OST	1987	—N/a	
"(What Can I Say) To Make You Love Me" †	Alexander O'Neal	—N/a	Hearsay	1987	—N/a	
"Sunshine" †	Alexander O'Neal	—N/a	Hearsay	1987	—N/a	
"Hearsay" †	Alexander O'Neal	—N/a	Hearsay	1987	—N/a	
"When the Party's Over"	Alexander O'Neal	—N/a	Hearsay	1987	—N/a	
"Never Knew Love Like This" †	Alexander O'Neal with Cherrelle	—N/a	Hearsay	1987	—N/a	
"Making Love in the Rain" †	Herb Alpert (featuring Janet Jackson and Lisa Keith)	—N/a	Keep Your Eye on Me	1987	—N/a	
"Diamonds" †	Herb Alpert (featuring Janet Jackson and Lisa Keith)	—N/a	Keep Your Eye on Me	1987	—N/a	
"Fake" †	Alexander O'Neal	—N/a	Hearsay	1987	—N/a	
"The Lovers" †	Alexander O'Neal	—N/a	Hearsay	1987	—N/a	
"Keep Your Eye on Me" †	Herb Alpert (featuring Lisa Keith)	—N/a	Keep Your Eye on Me	1987	—N/a	
"Pillow"	Herb Alpert (featuring Lani Hall)	—N/a	Keep Your Eye on Me	1987	—N/a	
"Looks Aren't Everything"	Cherrelle	—N/a	Affair	1988	—N/a	
"Our First Christmas"	Alexander O'Neal	—N/a	My Gift to You	1988	—N/a	
"Thank You for a Good Year" †	Alexander O'Neal	—N/a	My Gift to You	1988	—N/a	
"Everything I Miss at Home" †	Cherrelle	—N/a	Affair	1988	—N/a	
"Pick Me Up"	Cherrelle	—N/a	Affair	1988	—N/a	
"Discreet"	Cherrelle	—N/a	Affair	1988	—N/a	
"Remember Why (It's Christmas)"	Alexander O'Neal	—N/a	My Gift to You	1988	—N/a	
"Happy That You're With Me"	Cherrelle	—N/a	Affair	1988	—N/a	
"Sleigh Ride"	Alexander O'Neal	—N/a	My Gift to You	1988	—N/a	
"What More Can I Do for You"	Cherrelle	—N/a	Affair	1988	—N/a	
"Foolin' Around"	Cherrelle	—N/a	Affair	1988	—N/a	
"If It Isn't Love" †	New Edition	—N/a	Heart Break	1988	—N/a	
"Keep It Inside"	Cherrelle (featuring Alexander O'Neal)	—N/a	Affair	1988	—N/a	
"Home"	Cherrelle	—N/a	Affair	1988	—N/a	
"Can You Stand the Rain" †	New Edition	—N/a	Heart Break	1988	—N/a	
"You're Not My Kind of Girl" †	New Edition	—N/a	Heart Break	1988	—N/a	
"Supernatural"	New Edition	Jellybean Johnson	Ghostbusters II OST	1989	—N/a	
"My Gift to You"	Alexander O'Neal	—N/a	My Gift to You	1988	—N/a	
"State of the World" †	Janet Jackson	Janet Jackson	Rhythm Nation 1814	1989	—N/a	
"N.E. Heart Break" †	New Edition	—N/a	Heart Break	1988	—N/a	
"Where It All Started"	New Edition	—N/a	Heart Break	1988	—N/a	
"Miss You Much" †	Janet Jackson	—N/a	Rhythm Nation 1814	1989	—N/a	
"The Knowledge"	Janet Jackson	—N/a	Rhythm Nation 1814	1989	"I Get Lifted" by KC & the Sunshine Band	
"Love Will Never Do (Without You)" †	Janet Jackson	—N/a	Rhythm Nation 1814	1989	—N/a	
"I'm Comin' Home"	New Edition	—N/a	Heart Break	1988	—N/a	
"Boys to Men"	New Edition	—N/a	Heart Break	1988	—N/a	
"Rhythm Nation" †	Janet Jackson	Janet Jackson; Sylvester Stewart	Rhythm Nation 1814	1989	"Thank You (Falettinme Be Mice Elf Agin)" by Sly & the Family Stone	
"Affair" †	Cherrelle	—N/a	Affair	1988	—N/a	
"Alright" †	Janet Jackson	Janet Jackson; James Brown	Rhythm Nation 1814	1989	"Think (About It)" by Lyn Collins	
"Escapade" †	Janet Jackson	Janet Jackson	Rhythm Nation 1814	1989	—N/a	
"Come Back to Me" †	Janet Jackson	Janet Jackson	Rhythm Nation 1814	1989	—N/a	
"Livin' in a World (They Didn't Make)"	Janet Jackson	—N/a	Rhythm Nation 1814	1989	—N/a	
"Lonely"	Janet Jackson	—N/a	Rhythm Nation 1814	1989	—N/a	
"Someday Is Tonight"	Janet Jackson	Janet Jackson	Rhythm Nation 1814	1989	—N/a	
"You Need Me"	Janet Jackson	Janet Jackson	Miss You Much B-Side	1989	—N/a	
"State of Attraction"	Rhonda Clark	—N/a	Between Friends	1989	—N/a	
"Not Thru Being With You" †	Michael Jeffries and Karyn White	—N/a	Michael Jeffries	1989	—N/a	
"The Skin Game Pt. 1 / Pt. 2"	Janet Jackson	—N/a	"Come Back to Me" B-Side	1990	—N/a	
"Sensitivity" †	Ralph Tresvant	—N/a	Ralph Tresvant	1990	—N/a	
"Rub You the Right Way" †	Johnny Gill	—N/a	Johnny Gill	1990	"Pump Up the Bass" by DJ Jazzy Jeff & the Fresh Prince; "Funky President (People It's Bad)" by James Brown; "Ooh, I Love It (Love Break)" by the Salsoul Orchestra	
"Sensitivity (Extended Club Video Mix)" †	Ralph Tresvant	—N/a	Sensitivity	1990	"Human" by the Human League; "Bring the Noise" by Public Enemy; "Hot Pants, Pt. 1 (She Got to Use What She Got to Get What She Wants)" by James Brown; "Pass the Peas" by James Brown and the J.B.'s	
"Alright (Single Remix)" †	Janet Jackson (featuring Heavy D)	Janet Jackson; James Brown; Dwight Myers; Carlos Ward	Alright	1990	"Think (About It)" by Lyn Collins; "Do You Like It?" by B.T. Express	
"She's My Love Thang"	Ralph Tresvant	Leonard Caston, Jr.; Anita Poree; Frank Wilson	Ralph Tresvant	1990	"Keep on Truckin'" by Eddie Kendricks	
"Rated R" †	Ralph Tresvant	Ralph Tresvant; Norman Whitfield; James Brown	Ralph Tresvant	1990	"Masterpiece" by the Temptations; "Escape-Ism" by James Brown; "Do It Baby" by the Miracles; "The Grunt" by the J.B.'s; "A Little Soul Party" by Ohio Players	
"Do What I Gotta Do" †	Ralph Tresvant	—N/a	Ralph Tresvant	1990	—N/a	
"Jerk Out" †	The Time	Prince Nelson; Jellybean Johnson; Morris Day; Monte Moir; Jerome Benton	Pandemonium	1990	—N/a	
"Jerk Out (Sexy Mix) / (Sexy Dub)" †	The Time	Prince Nelson; Jellybean Johnson; Morris Day; Monte Moir; Jerome Benton; Carlton Ridenhour; Hank Shocklee; Eric Sadler; Robert E. Taylor; Mark Caponni; Harry Palmer	Jerk Out	1990	"Can't Do Nuttin' for Ya, Man!" by Public Enemy; "My Thang" by James Brown; "Sang and Dance" by the Bar-Kays; "The Champ" by the Mohawks; "La Di Da Di" by Doug E. Fresh and Slick Rick	
"Let's Spend the Night"	Johnny Gill	H. Randall Davis	Johnny Gill	1990	—N/a	
"Wrap My Body Tight" †	Johnny Gill	—N/a	Johnny Gill	1990	—N/a	
"Used"	Alexander O'Neal	—N/a	All True Man	1991	—N/a	
"Sentimental"	Alexander O'Neal	—N/a	All True Man	1991	—N/a	
"Hooked on You"	Karyn White	—N/a	Ritual of Love	1991	—N/a	
"The Pressure, Pt. 1" †	Sounds of Blackness	Gary Hines	The Evolution of Gospel	1991	"Movin'" by Brass Construction	
"The Pressure, Pt. 1 (Serious Lo-Key? Mix)" †	Sounds of Blackness	Gary Hines; Carlton Ridenhour; Hank Shocklee; Eric Sadler; Robert E. Taylor; Mark Caponni	The Pressure, Pt. 1 (Radio Mixes + Club Mixes)	1991	"Movin'" by Brass Construction; "Traffic Jammer" by the Bar-Kays; "Can't Do Nuttin' for Ya, Man!" by Public Enemy; "Kool Is Back" by Funk, Inc.; "Get Off Your Ass and Jam" by Funkadelic and Parliament; "The Grunt" by the J.B.'s; "UFO" by ESG; "Get Up Offa That Thing" by James Brown	
"Time Is Running Out"	Alexander O'Neal	James Brown	All True Man	1991	"Movin'" by Brass Construction; "Ain't It Funky" by James Brown; "Funky Drummer" by James Brown	
"Love That's Mine"	Karyn White	Karyn White	Ritual of Love	1991	—N/a	
"The Yoke (G.U.O.T.R.)" †	Alexander O'Neal	Tony "Prof-T" Tolbert; George Clinton; Garry Shider; David Spradley	All True Man	1991	"Atomic Dog" by George Clinton; "Girl You Know It's True" by Milli Vanilli; "Pump That Bass" by Original Concept; "Scorpio" by Dennis Coffey and the Detroit Guitar Band	
"What Is This Thing Called Love?" †	Alexander O'Neal	—N/a	All True Man	1991	—N/a	
"One Heart"	Karyn White	—N/a	Ritual of Love	1991	—N/a	
"Ritual of Love"	Karyn White	Karyn White	Ritual of Love	1991	—N/a	
"Tears of Joy"	Karyn White	Karyn White; Vernon D. Fails; Michael J. Powell	Ritual of Love	1991	—N/a	
"Walkin' the Dog"	Karyn White	Karyn White; Tony Haynes; Laney Stewart	Ritual of Love	1991	"The Grunt" by the J.B.'s	
"The Pressure, Pt. 2"	Sounds of Blackness	Gary Hines	The Evolution of Gospel	1991	—N/a	
"The Morning After"	Alexander O'Neal	—N/a	All True Man	1991	—N/a	
"Somebody (Changed Your Mind)"	Alexander O'Neal	—N/a	All True Man	1991	—N/a	
"All True Man" †	Alexander O'Neal	—N/a	All True Man	1991	—N/a	
"Hard to Say Goodbye"	Karyn White	Karyn White; Tony Haynes; Lawrence Waddell	Ritual of Love	1991	—N/a	
"Romantic" †	Karyn White	Karyn White	Ritual of Love	1991	"UFO" by ESG; "Here We Go (Live at the Funhouse)" by Run-D.M.C.	
"Romantic (Sexy Mix)" †	Karyn White	Karyn White	Romantic	1991	"UFO" by ESG; "Think (About It)" by Lyn Collins; "Here We Go (Live at the Funhouse)" by Run-D.M.C.; "Funky President (People It's Bad)" by James Brown; "Lesson 1 (The Pay-Off Mix)" by Double Dee and Steinski	
"Testify" †	Sounds of Blackness	Gary Hines	The Evolution of Gospel	1991	—N/a	
"Optimistic" †	Sounds of Blackness	Gary Hines; Burt Bacharach; Hal David	The Evolution of Gospel	1991	"One Man Band (Plays All Alone)" by Monk Higgins feat. the Specialties	
"Optimistic (Never Say Die Mix)" †	Sounds of Blackness (featuring Prof-T of Lo-Key?)	Gary Hines; Tony "Prof-T" Tolbert; Burt Bacharach; Hal David; Paul Simon	Optimistic / Testify	1991	"One Man Band (Plays All Alone)" by Monk Higgins feat. the Specialties; "Take Me to the Mardi Gras" by Bob James	
"Shame on Me"	Alexander O'Neal	Stanley Howard	All True Man	1991	—N/a	
"Slow and Sexy" †	Shabba Ranks (featuring Johnny Gill)	Clifton "Specialist" Dillon; Lowell F. Dunbar; Rexton Gordon	X-tra Naked	1992	—N/a	
"I Adore You" †	Caron Wheeler	Caron Wheeler; Burt Bacharach; Hal David	Mo' Money OST	1992	"Don't Make Me Over" by Sybil	
"Money Can't Buy You Love" †	Ralph Tresvant	Ralph Tresvant	Mo' Money OST	1992	—N/a	
"Brother Will"	The Harlem Yacht Club	Jellybean Johnson; Mark Haynes; Frank Stribbling	Mo' Money OST	1992	—N/a	
"The New Style"	Jimmy Jam & Terry Lewis	—N/a	Mo' Money OST	1992	"Last Night Changed It All (I Really Had a Ball)" by Esther Williams	
"Let's Get Together (So Groovy Now)" †	Krush	Tony Tolbert; Jim Post	Mo' Money OST	1992	"Reach Out of the Darkness" by Friend and Lover	
"Let's Get Together (So Groovy Now) (70's Club Mix)" †	Krush	Tony Tolbert; Jerry Lordan	Let's Get Together (So Groovy Now)	1992	"Apache (Jump on It)" by the Sugarhill Gang	
"Let's Get Together (So Groovy Now) (B. Ross Avila 90's For The People Club Mix)" †	Krush	Tony Tolbert; Bobby Ross Avila; Claydes Smith; Dennis "D.T." Thomas; Donald Boyce; George Brown; Richard Westfield; Jimmy Crosby; Robert "Kool" Bell; Robert "Spike" Mickens; Ronald Bell; Harry Palmer	Let's Get Together (So Groovy Now)	1992	"I Can't Stop" by John Davis and the Monster Orchestra; "Who's Gonna Take the Weight" by Kool & the Gang; "The Champ" by the Mohawks; "South Bronx" by Boogie Down Productions	
"Forever Love" †	Color Me Badd	Kevin Thornton; Sam Watters; Bryan Abrams; Mark Calderon	Mo' Money OST	1992	—N/a	
"Soul Holidays" †	Sounds of Blackness	James "Big Jim" Wright; Ann-Bennett Nesby; Jamecia Bennett; James Brown; Fred Wesley; John Starks	The Night Before Christmas...A Musical Fantasy	1992	"The Payback" by James Brown; "Funky President (People It's Bad)" by James Brown; "Impeach the President" by the Honey Drippers	
"Mo' Money Groove"	Mo' Money Allstars	James Brown; Lyn Collins; Fred Wesley; Kenneth Gamble; Leon Huff	Mo' Money OST	1992	"You Can't Love Me If You Don't Respect Me" by Lyn Collins; "Get Me Back on Time, Engine No. 9" by Wilson Pickett; "Soul Power" by James Brown; "Welcome to the Terrordome" by Public Enemy	
"The Best Things in Life Are Free" †	Luther Vandross and Janet Jackson (featuring Bell Biv DeVoe and Ralph Tresvant)	Michael Bivins; Ronnie DeVoe; Ralph Tresvant; Harry Wayne Casey; Richard Finch	Mo' Money OST	1992	"I Get Lifted" by George McCrae	
"Let's Just Run Away"	Johnny Gill	Lance Alexander; Tony Tolbert	Mo' Money OST	1992	—N/a	
"Ice Cream Dream" †	MC Lyte	Lana Moorer; Erick Sermon; Parrish Smith; Allen J. Williams; Billy Nichols; George Clinton; Walter "Junie" Morrison; Garry Shider; Simon Harris	Mo' Money OST	1992	"So Wat Cha Sayin'" by EPMD; "If It Don't Turn You On (You Oughta' Leave It Alone)" by B.T. Express; "One Nation Under a Groove" by Funkadelic; "Fairplay" by Soul II Soul (featuring Rose Windross); "Impeach the President" by the Honey Drippers; "FX & Scratches" by Simon Harris; "The Breaks" by Kurtis Blow; "Catch the Beat" by T-Ski Valley	
"Ice Cream Dream (Remix 12")" †	MC Lyte	Lana Moorer; George Clinton; Walter "Junie" Morrison; Garry Shider	Ice Cream Dream	1992	"One Nation Under a Groove" by Funkadelic; "Last Night Changed It All (I Really Had a Ball)" by Esther Williams; "Put Your Love (in My Tender Care)" by the Fatback Band; "It's Yours" by T-La Rock and Jazzy Jay; "The Break" by Kurtis Blow; "Catch the Beat" by T-Ski Valley; "Mama Said Knock You Out" by LL Cool J; "Brand New Funk" by DJ Jazzy Jeff & the Fresh Prince; "Pee-Wee's Dance" by Joeski Love; "Lyte as a Rock" by MC Lyte; "The Breakdown (Part I)" by Rufus Thomas	
"A Job Ain't Nuthin' but Work"	Big Daddy Kane (featuring Lo-Key?)	Antonio Hardy; Lance Alexander; Tony Tolbert; Darron Story; Roger Troutman; Larry Troutman; Maurice White; Al McKay; George Clinton; Bootsy Collins; Jeffrey Mitchell; Rahni Harris; Terry Philips; Ralph Hunt, Jr., Prince Nelson	Mo' Money OST	1992	"So Ruff, So Tuff" by Roger; "Best of My Love" by the Emotions; "Work That Sucker to Death" by Xavier (featuring George Clinton and Bootsy Collins); "These Are the J.B.'s" by James Brown and the J.B.'s; "Rated X" by Kool & the Gang; "Tough" by Kurtis Blow; "The Champ" by the Mohawks; "Let's Work" by Prince; "Get Up, Get Into It, Get Involved" by James Brown	
"My Dear"	Mint Condition	Stokley Williams; Jeffrey Allen; Homer O'Dell; Keri Lewis; Ricky Kinchen; Lawrence Waddell	Mo' Money OST	1992	—N/a	
"That's the Way Love Goes" †	Janet Jackson	Janet Jackson; James Brown; Charles Bobbit; Fred Wesley; John Starks; Allen J. Williams; Billy Nichols	Janet	1993	"Papa Don't Take No Mess" by James Brown; "If It Don't Turn You On (You Oughta' Leave It Alone)" by B.T. Express; "Impeach the President" by the Honey Drippers	
"You Want This" †	Janet Jackson	Janet Jackson; Claydes Smith; Dennis "D.T." Thomas; Donald Boyce; George Brown; Richard Westfield; Robert "Kool" Bell; Robert "Spike" Mickens; Ronald Bell; Richard Dean Taylor; Frank Wilson; Pam Sawyer; Henry Cosby; Deke Richards	Janet	1993	"Love Child" by Diana Ross & the Supremes; "Jungle Boogie" by Kool & the Gang; "Son of Shaft" by the Bar-Kays; "Think (About It)" by Lyn Collins	
"Provocative"	Johnny Gill	—N/a	Provocative	1993	—N/a	
"If" †	Janet Jackson	Janet Jackson; Harvey Fuqua; Johnny Bristol; Jackey Beavers	Janet	1993	"Someday We'll Be Together" by Diana Ross & the Supremes; "Bang Zoom (Let's Go-Go)" by the Real Roxanne (featuring Hitman Howie Tee); "Hihache" by Lafayette Afro Rock Band; "Honky-Tonk Haven" by John McLaughlin	
"The Floor" †	Johnny Gill	—N/a	Provocative	1993	—N/a	
"Where No Man Has Gone Before"	Johnny Gill	—N/a	Provocative	1993	—N/a	
"New Agenda"	Janet Jackson (featuring Chuck D)	Janet Jackson; Carlton Ridenhour; Stevie Wonder; Claydes Smith; Dennis "D.T." Thomas; Gene Redd; George Brown; Woody Sparrow; Richard Westfield; Robert "Kool" Bell; Robert "Spike" Mickens; Roger Ball; Steven Ferrone; Alan Gorrie; Owen McIntyre; Malcolm Duncan; Hamish Stuart	Janet	1993	"Superwoman (Where Were You When I Needed You?)" by Stevie Wonder; "Kool It (Here Comes the Fuzz)" by Kool & the Gang; "School Boy Crush" by Average White Band; "Nothin' but a "G" Thang" by Dr. Dre and Snoop Dogg	
"Throb" †	Janet Jackson	Janet Jackson	Janet	1993	—N/a	
"Because of Love" †	Janet Jackson	Janet Jackson	Janet	1993	—N/a	
"Mastersuite"	Johnny Gill	James Todd Smith; Johnny Gill	Provocative	1993	—N/a	
"Quiet Time to Play"	Johnny Gill	—N/a	Provocative	1993	—N/a	
"Any Time, Any Place" †	Janet Jackson	Janet Jackson	Janet	1993	—N/a	
"I Know Where I Stand"	Johnny Gill	Karyn White; Billy Steele	Provocative	1993	—N/a	
"Choose" †	Color Me Badd	Kevin Thornton; Sam Watters; Bryan Abrams; Mark Calderon; Lloyd Pinchback	Time and Chance	1993	"Ashley's Roachclip" by the Soul Searchers	
"Again" †	Janet Jackson	Janet Jackson	Janet	1993	—N/a	
"This Time"	Janet Jackson	Janet Jackson	Janet	1993	—N/a	
"Funky Big Band"	Janet Jackson	Janet Jackson; Benny Carter	Janet	1993	"I'm in the Mood for Swing" by Lionel Hampton and His Orchestra	
"The Body That Loves You"	Janet Jackson	Janet Jackson	Janet	1993	—N/a	
"Where Are You Now"	Janet Jackson	Janet Jackson	Janet	1993	—N/a	
"And On and On"	Janet Jackson	Janet Jackson; Sylvester Stewart	Janet	1993	"Family Affair" by Sly & the Family Stone	
"A Cute, Sweet, Love Addiction" †	Johnny Gill	Jack Daniels; Bonnie Thompson	Provocative	1993	"Turn Back the Hands of Time" by Tyrone Davis	
"Love Isn't Body...It's Soul"	Lisa Keith	Trevor Romeo; Tim Curtis; Tony Addis	Walkin' in the Sun	1993	"In the Heat of the Night" by Soul II Soul	
"I'm in Love" †	Lisa Keith	Lisa Keith	Walkin' in the Sun	1993	—N/a	
"Free as You Wanna Be"	Lisa Keith	Bobby Womack; Henrik Rasmussen; Alonzo Evans; Alvin Marino; Horace Glenn; Joseph Thomas; Kirk Walker; Marvin Andrews; July; Quadri Wallace; Robert Hammond; Walter Simon	Walkin' in the Sun	1993	"The Real Deal" by Lifers Group; "N.T." by Kool & the Gang; "Funky President (People It's Bad)" by James Brown; "Even When You Sleep" by the S.O.S. Band	
"All Around the World"	Boyz II Men	Nathan Morris; Shawn Stockman; Wanya Morris; Michael McCary; Glenn "Daddy-O" Bolton	II	1994	"Kid Capri" by Daddy-O; "Fairplay" by Soul II Soul (featuring Rose Windross); "Holy Ghost" by the Bar-Kays	
"On Bended Knee" †	Boyz II Men	—N/a	II	1994	—N/a	
"I Believe" †	Sounds of Blackness	Leroy "Sugarfoot" Bonner; Marvin Pierce; Marshall Jones; Norman Napier; Andrew Noland; Gregory Webster; Walter Morrison; Ralph Middlebrook	Africa to America: The Journey of the Drum	1994	"Pain" by Ohio Players	
"Everything Is Gonna Be Alright" †	Sounds of Blackness	Burt Bacharach; Hal David	Africa to America: The Journey of the Drum	1994	"Walk On By" by Issac Hayes	
"Black Butterfly" †	Sounds of Blackness	—N/a	Africa to America: The Journey of the Drum	1994	—N/a	
"The Lord Will Make a Way"	Sounds of Blackness	James "Big Jim" Wright	Africa to America: The Journey of the Drum	1994	—N/a	
"He Took Away All My Pain"	Sounds of Blackness	James "Big Jim" Wright; Ann Bennett-Nesby	Africa to America: The Journey of the Drum	1994	—N/a	
"A Place in My Heart"	Sounds of Blackness	James "Big Jim" Wright; Ann Bennett-Nesby	Africa to America: The Journey of the Drum	1994	—N/a	
"The Harder They Are, The Bigger They Fall"	Sounds of Blackness	—N/a	Africa to America: The Journey of the Drum	1994	—N/a	
"The Drum (Africa to America)"	Sounds of Blackness	Gary Hines; Joseph Young	Africa to America: The Journey of the Drum	1994	—N/a	
"Turn It Up" †	Raja-Neé	Raja-Neé; Chris Jasper; Ernie Isley; Marvin Isley; O'Kelly Isley; Ronald Isley; Rudolph Isley	A Low Down Dirty Shame OST / Hot & Ready	1994	"Make Me Say It Again, Girl" by the Isley Brothers; "Hip Hop Hooray" by Naughty by Nature	
"Give It to Me"	Raja-Neé	Raja-Neé	Hot & Ready	1994	—N/a	
"Take Your Time"	Raja-Neé	Raja-Neé; James "Big Jim" Wright	Hot & Ready	1994	—N/a	
"Hungah" †	Karyn White	Karyn White; James Brown; Fred Wesley; John Starks; Edward Marion; Henderson Thigpen; James Banks	Make Him Do Right	1994	"The Payback" by James Brown; "Holy Ghost" by the Bar-Kays; "Impeach the President" by the Honey Drippers	
"Weakness"	Karyn White	Karyn White	Make Him Do Right	1994	—N/a	
"Gotta Get Yo' Groove On"	Tevin Campbell	Tevin Campbell; Prince Nelson	A Low Down Dirty Shame OST	1994	"Get It Up" by the Time	
"I'm Your Woman"	Karyn White	Karyn White; McKinley Horton	Make Him Do Right	1994	—N/a	
"Simple Pleasures"	Karyn White	Karyn White	Make Him Do Right	1994	—N/a	
"Thinkin' 'Bout Love"	Karyn White	Karyn White; James "Big Jim" Wright	Make Him Do Right	1994	—N/a	
"I Only Want to Be With You" †	Barry White	Barry White; Issac Hayes	The Icon Is Love	1994	"Breakthrough" by Issac Hayes	
"One Minute"	Karyn White	Karyn White; James "Big Jim" Wright	Make Him Do Right	1994	—N/a	
"Come On" †	Barry White	Barry White; James "Big Jim" Wright	The Icon Is Love	1994	—N/a	
"The Right Kinda Lover" †	Patti LaBelle	Ann Bennett-Nesby; James "Big Jim" Wright	Gems	1994	"Impeach the President" by the Honey Drippers	
"Next Time"	Gladys Knight	—N/a	Just for You	1994	—N/a	
"Good Ole Fashion Love"	Lo-Key?	Lance Alexander; Tony Tolbert; James "Big Jim" Wright	Back 2 Da Howse	1994	—N/a	
"Too Good to be Through"	Patti LaBelle	—N/a	Gems	1994	—N/a	
"Mood"	Chanté Moore	Chanté Moore	A Love Supreme	1994	—N/a	
"Twenty Foreplay" †	Janet Jackson	Janet Jackson	Design of a Decade: 1986-1996	1995	—N/a	
"Back 2 da Street"	Solo	Alexander Richbourg; Daniele Stokes; Darnell Chavis; Eunique Mack; Robert Anderson; Harry Wayne Casey; Richard Finch; James Brown; Charles Bobbit; Bobby Byrd	Solo	1995	"I Get Lifted" by KC & the Sunshine Band; "I Know You Got Soul" by Bobby Byrd; "Impeach the President" by the Honey Drippers	
"Runaway" †	Janet Jackson	Janet Jackson	Design of a Decade: 1986-1996	1995	—N/a	
"The Thrill I'm In"	Luther Vandross	—N/a	Greatest Hits 1981-1995	1995	—N/a	
"Holdin' On"	Solo	Daniele Stokes; Darnell Chavis; Eunique Mack; Robert Anderson	Solo	1995	—N/a	
"Blowin' My Mind"	Solo	Daniele Stokes; Darnell Chavis; Eunique Mack; Robert Anderson; Raymond Calhoun	Solo	1995	"Outstanding" by the Gap Band	
"Heaven" †	Solo	James "Big Jim" Wright; Daniele Stokes; Darnell Chavis; Eunique Mack; Robert Anderson	Solo	1995	—N/a	
"Heaven (Sheets Remix)" †	Solo	James "Big Jim" Wright; Daniele Stokes; Darnell Chavis; Eunique Mack; Robert Anderson; Chris Jasper; Ernie Isley; Marvin Isley; O'Kelly Isley; Ronald Isley; Rudolph Isley	Heaven	1995	"Between the Sheets" by the Isley Brothers; "For the Love of You" by the Isley Brothers	
"Heaven (Express Your Remix)" †	Solo	James "Big Jim" Wright; Daniele Stokes; Darnell Chavis; Eunique Mack; Robert Anderson; Charles Wright	Heaven	1995	"Express Yourself" by Charles Wright & the Watts 103rd Street Rhythm Band	
"Heaven (Devotion Remix)" †	Solo	James "Big Jim" Wright; Daniele Stokes; Darnell Chavis; Eunique Mack; Robert Anderson; Maurice White; Phillip Bailey	Heaven	1995	"Devotion" by Earth, Wind & Fire	
"In Bed"	Solo	—N/a	Solo	1995	—N/a	
"Heaven (Straight Hip Hop Joint) / (Radio Remix Hip Hop Joint)" †	Solo (featuring The Almighty Arrogant, Pudgee Tha Phat Bastard, Rufus Blaq and Young Zee)	Chad "Dr. Ceuss" Elliott; James "Big Jim" Wright; Daniele Stokes; Darnell Chavis; Eunique Mack; Robert Anderson	Heaven	1995	"Flight Time" by Donald Byrd; "God Make Me Funky" by the Headhunters (featuring the Pointer Sisters); "You're Gettin' a Little Too Smart" by the Detroit Emeralds; "Flava in Ya Ear" by Craig Mack; "Scenario" by A Tribe Called Quest (featuring Leaders of the New School); "Da Mystery of Chessboxin'" by Wu-Tang Clan	
"Heaven (Hip Hop Remix)" †	Solo	James "Big Jim" Wright; Daniele Stokes; Darnell Chavis; Eunique Mack; Robert Anderson; Alvertis Isbell; Abrim Tilmon, Jr.	Heaven	1995	"I'll Take You There" by the Staple Singers; "You're Gettin' a Little Too Smart" by the Detroit Emeralds	
"Heaven (Uptempo Remix)" †	Solo	James "Big Jim" Wright; Daniele Stokes; Darnell Chavis; Eunique Mack; Robert Anderson; Craig Mack; Osten Harvey, Jr.; Joe Robinson	Heaven	1995	"Get Down" by Craig Mack; "Bumpin' Bus Stop" by Thunder & Lightning; "Love Rap" by Spoonie Gee; "Summer Madness" by Kool & the Gang; "A Few More Kisses to Go" by Issac Hayes	
"Xxtra"	Solo	Alexander Richbourg; Lance Alexander; Tony Tolbert; Tony Hester	Solo	1995	"In the Rain" by the Dramatics	
"He's Not Good Enough"	Solo	Daniele Stokes; Darnell Chavis; McKinley Horton	Solo	1995	—N/a	
"Where Do You Want Me to Put It?" †	Solo	McKinley Horton	Solo	1995	—N/a	
"Where Do You Want Me to Put It? (Sexual Healing Remix)" †	Solo	McKinley Horton; David Ritz; Marvin Gaye; Odell Brown	Where Do You Want Me to Put It?	1995	"Sexual Healing" by Marvin Gaye	
"(Action Speaks) Where Do You Want Me to Put It? (Gutta Remix)" †	Solo (featuring Lost Boyz)	Chad "Dr. Ceuss" Elliott; Eric Ruth; Raymond Rogers; Ronald Blackwell; Terrance Kelly; McKinley Horton; A.J. Castenell; Dwight Richards; Earnest Dabon; Frank Richard; Joseph Smith; Kenneth Williams; Lloyd Harris; Mario Tio; Robert Dabon	Where Do You Want Me to Put It?	1995	"Action Speaks Louder than Words" by Chocolate Milk	
"Where Do You Want Me / Get It On (Live Remix)" †	Solo	McKinley Horton; Ed Townsend; Marvin Gaye	Where Do You Want Me to Put It?	1995	"Let's Get It On" by Marvin Gaye	
"(Last Night I Made Love) Like Never Before"	Solo	Alexander Richbourg; Daniele Stokes; Darnell Chavis; Eunique Mack; Robert Anderson; Curtis Mayfield; Issac Hayes	Solo	1995	"The Makings of You" by Curtis Mayfield; "A Few More Kisses to Go" by Issac Hayes	
"Scream" †	Michael Jackson and Janet Jackson	Michael Jackson; Janet Jackson	HIStory: Past, Present and Future, Book I	1995	—N/a	
"HIStory"	Michael Jackson	Michael Jackson	HIStory: Past, Present and Future, Book I	1995	—N/a	
"Tabloid Junkie"	Michael Jackson	Michael Jackson	HIStory: Past, Present and Future, Book I	1995	—N/a	
"Oh, Yeah, It Feels So Good"	New Edition	Ricky Bell; Ronnie DeVoe; James Brown; Fred Wesley; John Starks	Home Again	1996	"No One's Gonna Love You" by the S.O.S. Band; "The Payback" by James Brown	
"Don't Wanna Lose You" †	Lionel Richie	Lionel Richie	Louder than Words	1996	—N/a	
"I'm Still in Love with You" †	New Edition	—N/a	Home Again	1996	—N/a	
"I Wanna Take You Down"	Lionel Richie	Leroy "Sugarfoot" Bonner; Marvin Pierce; Marshall Jones; Norman Napier; Andrew Noland; Gregory Webster; Clarence Satchell; Walter Morrison; Ralph Middlebrook	Louder than Words	1996	"Ecstasy" by Ohio Players	
"One More Day" †	New Edition	Al Jackson, Jr.; Booker T. Jones; Donald "Duck" Dunn; Steve Cropper	Home Again	1996	"Sunny Monday" by Booker T. & the M.G.'s	
"Say I Do"	Lionel Richie	James "Big Jim" Wright	Louder than Words	1996	—N/a	
"Maybe"	Johnny Gill	—N/a	Let's Get the Mood Right	1996	—N/a	
"Take Me (I'm Yours)"	Johnny Gill	Johnny Gill; Joseph Powell; Vanessa Powers	Let's Get the Mood Right	1996	—N/a	
"Wishes" †	Nathan Morris	Nathan Morris; Stephen Stills	Kazaam OST	1996	"For What It's Worth" by Buffalo Springfield	
"I'll Make Your Dreams Come True" †	Subway	Ekundayo Paris; Nelson Pigford	Kazaam OST	1996	"It's Ecstasy When You Lay Down Next to Me" by Barry White	
"Something About You" †	New Edition	Edie Brickell; Alan Aly; Kenneth Withrow; John Bush; John House	Home Again	1996	"What I Am" by Edie Brickell & New Bohemians; "You're Gettin' a Little Too Smart" by the Detroit Emeralds	
"I Swear I'm in Love"	Usher	Raymond Calhoun	Kazaam OST	1996	"Outstanding" by the Gap Band	
"Get Down"	YBTO	YBTO; Saleem Cooper; Frank L. AcAfee, Jr.; Claydes Smith; Dennis "D.T." Thomas; Donald Boyce; George Brown; Richard Westfield; Robert "Kool" Bell; Robert "Spike" Mickens; Ronald Bell	Kazaam OST	1996	"Man's Best Friend" by George Clinton; "Dance Floor" by Zapp; "Jungle Boogie" by Kool & the Gang; "Get Down" by Craig Mack	
"Home Again"	New Edition	Michael Bivins	Home Again	1996	—N/a	
"If We Fall in Love Tonight"	Rod Stewart	—N/a	If We Fall in Love Tonight	1996	—N/a	
"Too Late, Too Soon" †	Jon Secada	Jon Secada	Secada	1997	—N/a	
"After All Is Said and Done"	Jon Secada	Jon Secada; James "Big Jim" Wright	Secada	1997	—N/a	
"Heaven Is You"	Jon Secada	Jon Secada; David Ritz; Marvin Gaye; Odell Brown	Secada	1997	"Sexual Healing" by Marvin Gaye	
"Forever (Is as Long as It Lasts)"	Jon Secada	Jon Secada	Secada	1997	—N/a	
"Is It Scary" †	Michael Jackson	Michael Jackson	Blood on the Dance Floor: HIStory in the Mix	1997	—N/a	
"Someone Like You"	Patti LaBelle	James "Big Jim" Wright	Flame	1997	—N/a	
"When You Talk About Love" †	Patti LaBelle	James "Big Jim" Wright; Al Green; Mabon Hodges	Flame	1997	"Evil Woman" by Electric Light Orchestra; "Fake" by Alexander O'Neal	
"Human II (Don't Turn Your Back on Me)"	Boyz II Men	Nathan Morris; Shawn Stockman; Wanya Morris; Michael McCary	Evolution	1997	"Human" by the Human League	
"4 Seasons of Loneliness" †	Boyz II Men	—N/a	Evolution	1997	—N/a	
"Happiness" †	Vanessa L. Williams	John R. Smith; George Clinton	Next	1997	"I Can't Wait" by Nu Shooz; "(Not Just) Knee Deep" by Funkadelic; "Midnight Theme" by Manzel	
"And If I Ever"	Vanessa L. Williams	—N/a	Next	1997	—N/a	
"I Won't Let You Do That to Me"	Luther Vandross	James "Big Jim" Wright	One Night with You: The Best of Love, Volume 2	1997	—N/a	
"Love Is All We Need" †	Mary J. Blige (featuring Nas)	Mary J. Blige; Nasir Jones; Rick James	Share My World	1997	"Moonchild" by Rick James	
"Everything" †	Mary J. Blige	Hachidai Nakamura; Rokusuke Ei; James Brown; Fred Wesley; John Starks; Linda Creed; Thom Bell	Share My World	1997	"Sukiyaki" by A Taste of Honey; "The Payback" by James Brown; "You Are Everything" by the Stylistics	
"The Velvet Rope"	Janet Jackson (featuring Vanessa-Mae)	Janet Jackson; René Elizondo Jr.; Malcolm McLaren; Trevor Horn; Mike Oldfield	The Velvet Rope	1997	"Hobo Scratch" by Malcolm McLaren and the World Famous Supreme Team; "Tubular Bells" by Mike Oldfield	
"You" †	Janet Jackson	Janet Jackson; René Elizondo Jr.; Harold Brown; Sylvester Allen; Morris Dickerson; Howard Scott; Leroy Jordan; Lee Oskar; Charles Miller	The Velvet Rope	1997	"The Cisco Kid" by War	
"My Need"	Janet Jackson	Janet Jackson; René Elizondo Jr.; Marilyn McLeod; Pam Sawyer; Nickolas Ashford; Valerie Simpson	The Velvet Rope	1997	"Love Hangover" by Diana Ross; "You're All I Need to Get By" by Marvin Gaye and Tammi Terrell	
"Got 'til It's Gone" †	Janet Jackson (featuring Joni Mitchell and Q-Tip)	Janet Jackson; René Elizondo Jr.; Joni Mitchell; Kamaal Fareed	The Velvet Rope	1997	"Big Yellow Taxi" by Joni Mitchell	
"Go Deep" †	Janet Jackson	Janet Jackson; René Elizondo Jr.	The Velvet Rope	1997	"One Nation Under a Groove" by Funkadelic; "I Can't Dance" by Genesis	
"Free Xone"	Janet Jackson	Janet Jackson; René Elizondo Jr.; James Brown; Billy Buttier; Archie Bell; Michael Hepburn	The Velvet Rope	1997	"Tighten Up" by Archie Bell & the Drells; "Think (About It)" by Lyn Collins; "Joyous" by Pleasure; "Don't You Worry 'Bout a Thing" by Stevie Wonder	
"Together Again" †	Janet Jackson	Janet Jackson; René Elizondo Jr.	The Velvet Rope	1997	—N/a	
"Empty"	Janet Jackson	Janet Jackson; René Elizondo Jr.	The Velvet Rope	1997	—N/a	
"Every Time" †	Janet Jackson	Janet Jackson; René Elizondo Jr.	The Velvet Rope	1997	—N/a	
"What About"	Janet Jackson	Janet Jackson; René Elizondo Jr.	The Velvet Rope	1997	—N/a	
"I Get Lonely" †	Janet Jackson	Janet Jackson; René Elizondo Jr.	The Velvet Rope	1997	—N/a	
"Rope Burn"	Janet Jackson	Janet Jackson; René Elizondo Jr.	The Velvet Rope	1997	—N/a	
"Anything"	Janet Jackson	Janet Jackson; René Elizondo Jr.	The Velvet Rope	1997	—N/a	
"God's Stepchild"	Janet Jackson	Janet Jackson; René Elizondo Jr.	The Velvet Rope	1997	—N/a	
"Free Again"	Soul II Soul, Jazzie B. and Caron Wheeler	Caron Wheeler; Trevor Romeo	How Stella Got Her Groove Back OST	1998	—N/a	
"The Art of Seduction"	Maxi Priest	Max Elliott	How Stella Got Her Groove Back OST	1998	—N/a	
"Make My Body Hot"	Diana King	Diana King; James "Big Jim" Wright	How Stella Got Her Groove Back OST	1998	—N/a	
"Dance for Me"	Kevin Ford (featuring Rufus Blaq)	Kevin Ford	How Stella Got Her Groove Back OST	1998	—N/a	
"Beautiful"	Mary J. Blige	Mary J. Blige; Curtis Mayfield; Will Jennings; Joe Sample	How Stella Got Her Groove Back OST	1998	"Give Me Your Love (Love Song)" by Curtis Mayfield; "Street Life" by the Crusaders	
"Luv Me, Luv Me" †	Shaggy (featuring Janet Jackson)	Orville Burrell; Alexander Richbourg; Norman Whitfield; Roy Hammond	How Stella Got Her Groove Back OST	1998	"Ooh Boy" by Rose Royce; "Impeach the President" by the Honey Drippers	
"Never Say Never Again"	K-Ci & JoJo	James "Big Jim" Wright	How Stella Got Her Groove Back OST	1998	—N/a	
"Your Home Is in My Heart" †	Boyz II Men and Chanté Moore	—N/a	How Stella Got Her Groove Back OST	1998	—N/a	
"It's On"	Smooth	Juanita Stokes; Al Green	Reality	1998	"Rhymes" by Al Green; "Got to Give It Up" by Marvin Gaye	
"Willing to Fight"	Smooth	Juanita Stokes; James "Big Jim" Wright	Reality	1998	—N/a	
"The Best Man I Can Be" †	Case, Ginuwine, R.L. Huggard and Tyrese	James "Big Jim" Wright	The Best Man OST	1999	—N/a	
"Open My Heart" †	Yolanda Adams	Yolanda Adams; James "Big Jim" Wright	Mountain High... Valley Low	1999	—N/a	
"Wherever You Are"	Yolanda Adams	Yolanda Adams; James "Big Jim" Wright; Leon Ware; Arthur "T-Boy" Ross	Mountain High... Valley Low	1999	"I Wanna Be Where You Are" by Michael Jackson	
"Already Alright"	Yolanda Adams	Yolanda Adams; James "Big Jim" Wright	Mountain High... Valley Low	1999	—N/a	
"Chanté's Got a Man" †	Chanté Moore	Chanté Moore; James "Big Jim" Wright; George Jackson	This Moment Is Mine	1999	"One Bad Apple" by the Osmonds	
"Chanté's Got a Man (I Got a Man Remix)" †	Chanté Moore (featuring Jermaine Dupri)	Chanté Moore; Jermaine Dupri; James "Big Jim" Wright; Darryl Gibson; David Foster; Cheryl Lynn; David Paich	Chanté's Got a Man	1999	"I Got a Man" by Positive K; "Got to Be Real" by Cheryl Lynn	
"Love and the Woman"	Chanté Moore	Chanté Moore; Dorothea Joyce	This Moment Is Mine	1999	"Love's Lines, Angles and Rhymes" by the 5th Dimension	
"I Cry to Myself"	Chanté Moore	Chanté Moore; James "Big Jim" Wright	This Moment Is Mine	1999	—N/a	
"Easy"	Chanté Moore	Chanté Moore; James "Big Jim" Wright	This Moment Is Mine	1999	—N/a	
"I Started Crying"	Chanté Moore	Chanté Moore	This Moment Is Mine	1999	—N/a	
"This Moment Is Mine"	Chanté Moore	Chanté Moore	This Moment Is Mine	1999	—N/a	
"Give It to You" †	Jordan Knight	Jordan Knight; Robin Thicke	Jordan Knight	1999	—N/a	
"A Different Party"	Jordan Knight	Jordan Knight; Robin Thicke; Jerry Corbetta; J.C. Phillips; Dave Riordan	Jordan Knight	1999	"Green-Eyed Lady" by Sugarloaf	
"Broken by You"	Jordan Knight	—N/a	Jordan Knight	1999	—N/a	
"Close My Eyes"	Jordan Knight	Jordan Knight; Robin Thicke; Kerry Livgren	Jordan Knight	1999	"Dust in the Wind" by Kansas	
"The Love I Never Had"	Mary J. Blige	Mary J. Blige; James "Big Jim" Wright	Mary	1999	"Let's Fall in Love (Parts 1 & 2)" by the Isley Brothers	
"I'm Good at Being Bad" †	TLC	Tony "Prof-T" Tolbert; Tionne "T-Boz" Watkins; Lisa "Left Eye" Lopes; Marshall Martin; Giorgio Moroder; Pete Belotte; Donna Summer; Harold Brown; Sylvester Allen; Morris Dickerson; Howard Scott; Leroy Jordan; Lee Oskar; Charles Miller	FanMail	1999	"Slippin' into Darkness" by War; "Love to Love You Baby" by Donna Summer	
"Bliss"	Mariah Carey	Mariah Carey; James "Big Jim" Wright	Rainbow	1999	—N/a	
"Petals"	Mariah Carey	Mariah Carey; James "Big Jim" Wright	Rainbow	1999	—N/a	
"Thank God I Found You" †	Mariah Carey (featuring Joe and 98 Degrees)	Mariah Carey	Rainbow	1999	—N/a	
"Thank God I Found You (Make It Last Remix)" †	Mariah Carey (featuring Joe and Nas)	Mariah Carey; Nasir Jones; Keith Sweat; Teddy Riley	My Name is Joe	2000	"Make It Last Forever" by Keith Sweat and Jacci McGhee	
"Doesn't Really Matter" †	Janet Jackson	Janet Jackson	Nutty Professor II: The Klumps OST	2000	—N/a	
"If You Wanna Have Some Fun"	Spice Girls	Victoria Beckham; Mel B; Emma Bunton; Melanie C	Forever	2000	—N/a	
"Oxygen"	Spice Girls	Victoria Beckham; Mel B; Emma Bunton; Melanie C	Forever	2000	—N/a	
"Dance & Shout" †	Shaggy (featuring Pee Wee)	Orville Burrell; Michael Jackson; Randall Jackson	Hot Shot	2000	"Shake Your Body (Down to the Ground)" by the Jacksons	
"Feels So Good" †	Mel B	Mel B	Hot	2000	—N/a	
"Feel Me Now"	Mel B	Mel B	Hot	2000	—N/a	
"Free" †	Mýa	Mya Harrison; Alexander Richbourg; Tony "Prof-T" Tolbert	Fear of Flying	2000	—N/a	
"Love's Still Alright"	Chanté Moore	Chanté Moore; James "Big Jim" Wright	Exposed	2000	—N/a	
"Better than Making Love"	Chanté Moore	Chanté Moore; James "Big Jim" Wright	Exposed	2000	—N/a	
"You Ain't Right"	Janet Jackson	Janet Jackson; Dana Stinson	All for You	2001	—N/a	
"All for You" †	Janet Jackson	Janet Jackson; Wayne Garfield; David Romani; Mauro Malavasi	All for You	2001	"The Glow of Love" by Change	
"Would You Mind"	Janet Jackson	Janet Jackson; Dana Stinson	All for You	2001	—N/a	
"Come On Get Up" †	Janet Jackson	Janet Jackson; Dana Stinson	All for You	2001	—N/a	
"When We Oooo"	Janet Jackson	Janet Jackson	All for You	2001	—N/a	
"China Love"	Janet Jackson	Janet Jackson	All for You	2001	—N/a	
"Love Scene (Ooh Baby)"	Janet Jackson	Janet Jackson	All for You	2001	—N/a	
"Feels So Right"	Janet Jackson	Janet Jackson; Dana Stinson	All for You	2001	—N/a	
"Twork It Out"	Usher	Usher Raymond IV; Marvin Gaye	8701	2001	"You Sure Love to Ball" by Marvin Gaye	
"Trust a Try"	Janet Jackson	Janet Jackson; Dana Stinson	All for You	2001	—N/a	
"No Regrets"	Case	Case; Jimmy Jam; Terry Lewis	Open Letter	2001	—N/a	
"Can U Help Me"	Usher	Usher Raymond IV	8701	2001	—N/a	
"How Do I Say"	Usher	Usher Raymond IV	8701	2001	—N/a	
"Who"	Janet Jackson	Janet Jackson; Dana Stinson	All for You	2001	—N/a	
"Son of a Gun (I Betcha Think This Song Is About You)" †	Janet Jackson (featuring Carly Simon)	Janet Jackson; Carly Simon	All for You	2001	"You're So Vain" by Carly Simon	
"Truth"	Janet Jackson	Janet Jackson; James "Big Jim" Wright; Stan Vincent	All for You	2001	"O-o-h Child" by Five Stairsteps	
"Someone to Call My Lover" †	Janet Jackson	Janet Jackson; Dewey Bunnell	All for You	2001	"Ventura Highway" by America	
"Better Days"	Janet Jackson	Janet Jackson	All for You	2001	—N/a	
"No More Drama" †	Mary J. Blige	Barry Vorzon; Perry Botkin	No More Drama	2001	"Nadia's Theme" from The Young and the Restless	
"Never Too Far" †	Mariah Carey	Mariah Carey	Glitter OST	2001	—N/a	
"Want You"	Mariah Carey (featuring Eric Benét)	Mariah Carey; James "Big Jim" Wright	Glitter OST	2001	—N/a	
"Twister"	Mariah Carey	Mariah Carey; James "Big Jim" Wright	Glitter OST	2001	—N/a	
"Swingin'"	Blu Cantrell	Dallas Austin; James "Big Jim" Wright; Billy Austin; Louis Jordan	So Blu	2001	"Is You Is or Is You Ain't My Baby" by Louis Jordan & His Tympany Five	
"I'll Find a Way"	Blu Cantrell	Tiffany Cobb; James "Big Jim" Wright	So Blu	2001	—N/a	
"Blu Is a Mood"	Blu Cantrell	James "Big Jim" Wright	So Blu	2001	—N/a	
"Never Give Up" †	Yolanda Adams	Yolanda Adams; James "Big Jim" Wright	Believe	2001	—N/a	
"I'm Gonna Be Ready"	Yolanda Adams	Yolanda Adams; James "Big Jim" Wright	Believe	2001	—N/a	
"I'm Thankful"	Yolanda Adams (featuring T-Bone)	Yolanda Adams; James "Big Jim" Wright; Etienne Clark; Grant W. Nicholas; Rene Sotomayor	Believe	2001	"Me Against the World" by 2Pac (featuring Dramacydal and Puff Johnson)	
"Oh Well"	Boyz II Men	Nathan Morris; Shawn Stockman; Wanya Morris; Michael McCary	Full Circle	2002	—N/a	
"That's Why I Love You"	Boyz II Men	Nathan Morris; Shawn Stockman; Wanya Morris; Michael McCary	Full Circle	2002	—N/a	
"Yours"	Mariah Carey	Mariah Carey; James "Big Jim" Wright	Charmbracelet	2002	—N/a	
"No More Drama (P. Diddy/Mario Winans Remix)" †	Mary J. Blige (featuring P. Diddy)	Barry Vorzon; Perry Botkin; Bernard Edwards; Nile Rodgers	We Invented the Remix	2002	"You Can't Do It Alone" by Chic	
"Up & Down (In & Out)"	Deborah Cox	Deborah Cox; Alexander Richbourg; James "Big Jim" Wright; Roy Ayers; Sylvia Striplin; James Bedford; Emmanuel Dibango	The Morning After	2002	"You Can't Turn Me Away" by Sylvia Striplin; "Soul Makossa" by Manu Dibango	
"Hurt So Much"	Deborah Cox	Deborah Cox; James "Big Jim" Wright	The Morning After	2002	—N/a	
"I Wish I Wasn't" †	Heather Headley	James "Big Jim" Wright	This Is Who I Am	2002	—N/a	
"Anatomy 1 on 1"	Mýa	Mýa Harrison; Bobby Ross Avila; Issiah J. Avila	Moodring	2003	—N/a	
"Late"	Mýa	Mýa Harrison; Bobby Ross Avila; Issiah J. Avila; Eddie Cole	Moodring	2003	—N/a	
"Things That Lovers Do"	Kenny Lattimore and Chanté Moore	Bobby Ross Avila; Issiah J. Avila	Things That Lovers Do	2003	—N/a	
"Loveable (From Your Head to Your Toes)"	Kenny Lattimore and Chanté Moore	Bobby Ross Avila; Issiah J. Avila; Michael Pickering	Things That Lovers Do	2003	—N/a	
"Get It While It's Hot" †	Nodesha	Alexander Richbourg; Tony "Prof-T" Tolbert; Bernard Edwards; Nile Rodgers	Nodesha	2003	"I Want Your Love" by Chic	
"Everything I Do"	Beyoncé and Bilal Oliver	James "Big Jim" Wright	The Fighting Temptations OST	2003	—N/a	
"He Still Loves Me"	Beyoncé and Walter Williams, Sr.	James "Big Jim" Wright	The Fighting Temptations OST	2003	—N/a	
"Time to Come Home"	Beyoncé, Angie Stone and Melba Moore	Beyoncé Knowles; James "Big Jim" Wright	The Fighting Temptations OST	2003	—N/a	
"Everybody's Somebody's Fool"	Aretha Franklin	James "Big Jim" Wright	So Damn Happy	2003	—N/a	
"Truth Hurts"	Usher	Usher Raymond IV; Bobby Ross Avila; Issiah J. Avila; Antonio Hardy	Confessions	2004	"Just Rhymin' With Biz" by Big Daddy Kane (featuring Biz Markie)	
"Bad Girl"	Usher	Usher Raymond IV; Bobby Ross Avila; Issiah J. Avila; Danté Barton	Confessions	2004	—N/a	
"Simple Things"	Usher	Usher Raymond IV; Bobby Ross Avila; Issiah J. Avila	Confessions	2004	—N/a	
"That's What It's Made For"	Usher	Usher Raymond IV; Bobby Ross Avila; Issiah J. Avila; James "Big Jim" Wright	Confessions	2004	—N/a	
"Seduction"	Usher	Usher Raymond IV; Bobby Ross Avila; Issiah J. Avila; James "Big Jim" Wright	Confessions	2004	—N/a	
"Damita Jo"	Janet Jackson	Janet Jackson; Bobby Ross Avila; Issiah J. Avila	Damita Jo	2004	—N/a	
"Strawberry Bounce"	Janet Jackson	Janet Jackson; Kanye West; Tony "Prof-T" Tolbert; Irving Lorenzo; Shawn Carter; Amil Whitehead; Jeffrey Atkins; Robin Mays	Damita Jo	2004	"Can I Get A..." by Jay-Z (featuring Amil and Ja Rule)	
"Spending Time with You"	Janet Jackson	Janet Jackson; Bobby Ross Avila; Issiah J. Avila	Damita Jo	2004	—N/a	
"Like You Don't Love Me"	Janet Jackson	Janet Jackson; Bobby Ross Avila; Issiah J. Avila	Damita Jo	2004	—N/a	
"All Nite (Don't Stop)" †	Janet Jackson	Janet Jackson; Anders Bagge; Arnthor Birgisson; Tony "Prof-T" Tolbert; Herbie Hancock; Paul Jackson; Melvin "Wah-Wah Watson" Ragin	Damita Jo	2004	"Hang Up Your Hang Ups" by Herbie Hancock	
"R&B Junkie" †	Janet Jackson	Janet Jackson; Tony "Prof-T" Tolbert; Kashif Saleem; Nicholas Trevisick	Damita Jo	2004	"I'm in Love" by Evelyn "Champagne" King	
"Warmth"	Janet Jackson	Janet Jackson	Damita Jo	2004	—N/a	
"Moist"	Janet Jackson	Janet Jackson; Bobby Ross Avila; Issiah J. Avila	Damita Jo	2004	—N/a	
"Truly"	Janet Jackson	Janet Jackson	Damita Jo	2004	—N/a	
"Harajuku Girls"	Gwen Stefani	Gwen Stefani; James "Big Jim" Wright; Bobby Ross Avila; Issiah J. Avila	Love. Angel. Music. Baby.	2004	—N/a	
"Sweet Kind of Life"	Cheryl Lynn	Cheryl Lynn; Bobby Ross Avila; Issiah J. Avila; Tony "Prof-T" Tolbert; James "Big Jim" Wright	Shark Tale OST	2004	—N/a	
"Pure Gold" †	Earth, Wind & Fire	Bobby Ross Avila; Issiah J. Avila; Tony "Prof-T" Tolbert	Illumination	2005	—N/a	
"Love's Dance"	Earth, Wind & Fire	Tony "Prof-T" Tolbert	Illumination / Robots OST	2005	—N/a	
"Alwaysness"	Yolanda Adams	Bobby Ross Avila; Issiah J. Avila	Day by Day	2005	—N/a	
"Baggage"	Mary J. Blige	Mary J. Blige; Bobby Ross Avila; Issiah J. Avila; James "Big Jim" Wright; Dave Young; Rick James; Angela Bofill; Narada Michael Walden; Jeffrey Cohen	The Breakthrough	2005	"All Night Long" by Mary Jane Girls; "Gotta Make It Up to You" by Angela Bofill	
"Can't Get Enough"	Mary J. Blige	Mary J. Blige; Bobby Ross Avila; Issiah J. Avila	The Breakthrough	2005	—N/a	
"Lift Him Up"	Yolanda Adams (featuring Donnie McClurkin and Mary Mary)	James "Big Jim" Wright	Day by Day	2005	—N/a	
"Be Blessed" †	Yolanda Adams	James "Big Jim" Wright	Day by Day	2005	—N/a	
"So Excited" †	Janet Jackson (featuring Khia)	Janet Jackson; Jermaine Dupri; James "LRoc" Phillips; Johnta Austin; Khia Chambers; Herbie Hancock; Michael Beinhorn; Bill Laswell	20 Y.O.	2006	"Rockit" by Herbie Hancock	
"Show Me"	Janet Jackson	Janet Jackson; Jermaine Dupri; Manuel Seal, Jr.; Johnta Austin	20 Y.O.	2006	—N/a	
"Get It Out Me"	Janet Jackson	Janet Jackson; Jermaine Dupri; Manuel Seal, Jr.; Johnta Austin	20 Y.O.	2006	—N/a	
"This Body"	Janet Jackson	Janet Jackson; Jermaine Dupri; James "LRoc" Phillips; Johnta Austin	20 Y.O.	2006	—N/a	
"With U" †	Janet Jackson	Janet Jackson; Jermaine Dupri; Manuel Seal, Jr.; Johnta Austin	20 Y.O.	2006	—N/a	
"Call on Me" †	Janet Jackson (featuring Nelly)	Janet Jackson; Jermaine Dupri; James "LRoc" Phillips; Johnta Austin; Cornell Haynes, Jr.	20 Y.O.	2006	"Tell Me If You Still Care" by the S.O.S. Band	
"Daybreak"	Janet Jackson	Janet Jackson; Johnta Austin	20 Y.O.	2006	—N/a	
"Take Care"	Janet Jackson	Janet Jackson	20 Y.O.	2006	—N/a	
"Love 2 Love"	Janet Jackson	Janet Jackson	20 Y.O.	2006	—N/a	
"Enjoy"	Janet Jackson	Janet Jackson; Bobby Ross Avila; Issiah J. Avila	20 Y.O.	2006	—N/a	
"Push Your Tush"	Jessica Simpson	Jessica Simpson; Tony "Prof-T" Tolbert; Leroy "Sugarfoot" Bonner; William Beck; James Williams; Marvin Pierce; Marshall Jones; Ralph Middlebrooks; Clarence Satchell	A Public Affair	2006	"Who'd She Coo?" by Ohio Players	
"Walkin' 'Round in a Circle"	Jessica Simpson	Jessica Simpson; Johnta Austin; Stevie Nicks	A Public Affair	2006	"Dreams" by Fleetwood Mac	
"Back to You"	Jessica Simpson	Jessica Simpson	A Public Affair	2006	—N/a	
"What's Not Being Said"	Heather Headley	James "Big Jim" Wright	In My Mind	2006	—N/a	
"Disrespectful" †	Chaka Khan and Mary J. Blige	Mary J. Blige; Bobby Ross Avila; Issiah J. Avila; Dave Young	Funk This	2007	—N/a	
"We Should Be"	Trey Songz	Tremaine Neverson; James "Big Jim" Wright	Trey Day	2007	—N/a	
"Home"	Carl Thomas	Carl Thomas; James "Big Jim" Wright	So Much Better	2007	—N/a	
"Love Is Not Made in Words"	Deborah Cox	Deborah Cox; James "Big Jim" Wright	The Promise	2008	—N/a	
"Did You Ever Love Me"	Deborah Cox	Deborah Cox; James "Big Jim" Wright	The Promise	2008	—N/a	
"All Hearts Aren't Shaped the Same"	Deborah Cox	James "Big Jim" Wright	The Promise	2008	—N/a	
"Higher than This"	Ledisi	Ledisi Young; James "Big Jim" Wright	Turn Me Loose	2009	—N/a	
"Song for Her"	Ruben Studdard	Ruben Studdard; John Jackson	Love Is	2009	—N/a	
"Every Step" †	Beverley Knight	Beverley Knight; Bobby Ross Avila; Issiah J. Avila; Johnny "Natural" Najera; Cedric Perrier	100%	2009	—N/a	
"So Impossible"	Keyshia Cole	Keyshia Cole; Carla Carter	Calling All Hearts	2010	—N/a	
"Joyful"	El DeBarge	El DeBarge	Second Chance	2010	—N/a	
"How Can You Love Me"	El DeBarge	El DeBarge; Bobby Ross Avila; Issiah J. Avila	Second Chance	2010	—N/a	
"Sad Songs"	El DeBarge	El DeBarge	Second Chance	2010	—N/a	
"The Other Side"	El DeBarge	El DeBarge	Second Chance	2010	—N/a	
"Monstar"	Usher	Usher Raymond IV; Miguel Pimentel; Johnny "Natural" Najera; Bobby Ross Avila; Issiah J. Avila	Raymond v. Raymond	2010	—N/a	
"Mars vs. Venus"	Usher	Usher Raymond IV; Miguel Pimentel; Bobby Ross Avila; Issiah J. Avila; Claude Debussy	Raymond v. Raymond	2010	"Snowflakes Are Dancing" by Isao Tomita	
"Lingerie"	Usher	Usher Raymond IV; Bobby Ross Avila; Issiah J. Avila	Raymond v. Raymond	2010	—N/a	
"Pro Lover"	Usher	Usher Raymond IV; Miguel Pimentel; Bobby Ross Avila; Issiah J. Avila	Raymond v. Raymond	2010	—N/a	
"Not Like You"	Boyz II Men	—N/a	Twenty	2011	—N/a	
"O7ven Intro"	The Original 7ven	—N/a	Condensate	2011	—N/a	
"Condensate"	The Original 7ven	—N/a	Condensate	2011	—N/a	
"If I Was Yo Man"	The Original 7ven	Morris Day	Condensate	2011	—N/a	
"Strawberry Lake"	The Original 7ven	Morris Day	Condensate	2011	—N/a	
"Faithful"	The Original 7ven	—N/a	Condensate	2011	—N/a	
"Cadillac"	The Original 7ven	—N/a	Condensate	2011	—N/a	
"Role Play"	The Original 7ven	Jesse Johnson; Morris Day	Condensate	2011	—N/a	
"Lifestyle"	The Original 7ven	Jesse Johnson; J. Dixon; Morris Day	Condensate	2011	—N/a	
"#Trendin'"	The Original 7ven	—N/a	Condensate	2011	—N/a	
"Sick"	The Original 7ven	Jesse Johnson	Condensate	2011	—N/a	
"AYDKMN"	The Original 7ven	Jesse Johnson	Condensate	2011	—N/a	
"One Step"	The Original 7ven	—N/a	Condensate	2011	—N/a	
"Hey Yo"	The Original 7ven	Morris Day	Condensate	2011	—N/a	
"Toast to the Party Girl"	The Original 7ven	—N/a	Condensate	2011	—N/a	
"GoHomeToYourMan"	The Original 7ven	Monte Moir	Condensate	2011	—N/a	
"Numb" † (Only written by Terry Lewis)	Usher	Usher Raymond IV; Ryon Lovett; Alessandro Lindblad; Axel Hedfors; Sebastian Ingrosso; Steve Angello; Klas Åhlund	Looking 4 Myself	2012	—N/a	
"Sins of My Father" (Only written by Terry Lewis)	Usher	Usher Raymond IV; Rico Love; Salaam Remi	Looking 4 Myself	2012	—N/a	
"Euphoria" (Only written by Terry Lewis)	Usher	Usher Raymond IV; Ryon Lovett; Axel Hedfors; Sebastian Ingrosso; Steve Angello; Klas Åhlund; Johnny "Natural" Najera	Looking 4 Myself	2012	—N/a	
"Hey Lover"	Charlie Wilson	Charlie Wilson; Bobby Ross Avila; Issiah J. Avila; Val Young; James "Big Jim" Wright	Forever Charlie	2015	—N/a	
"Things You Do"	Charlie Wilson	Charlie Wilson; Val Young	Forever Charlie	2015	—N/a	
"Me and You Forever"	Charlie Wilson	Charlie Wilson; Bobby Ross Avila; Issiah J. Avila; Edwin Serrano	Forever Charlie	2015	—N/a	
"Unbreakable" †	Janet Jackson	Janet Jackson; Thomas Lumpkins	Unbreakable	2015	—N/a	
"Burnitup!" †	Janet Jackson (featuring Missy Elliott)	Janet Jackson; Melissa Elliott; Dwayne Abernathy, Jr.; Tim Stahl; John Guldberg	Unbreakable	2015	"White Horse" by Laid Back	
"Dammn Baby"	Janet Jackson	Janet Jackson; Dwayne Abernathy, Jr.	Unbreakable	2015	—N/a	
"The Great Forever"	Janet Jackson	Janet Jackson	Unbreakable	2015	—N/a	
"Shoulda Known Better"	Janet Jackson	Janet Jackson	Unbreakable	2015	—N/a	
"After You Fall"	Janet Jackson	Janet Jackson	Unbreakable	2015	—N/a	
"Broken Hearts Heal"	Janet Jackson	Janet Jackson	Unbreakable	2015	—N/a	
"Night"	Janet Jackson	Janet Jackson; Dwayne Abernathy, Jr.; Michaela Renee Shiloh	Unbreakable	2015	"I Wanna Be Your Lover" by Prince	
"No Sleeep" †	Janet Jackson (featuring J. Cole)	Janet Jackson; Jermaine Cole	Unbreakable	2015	—N/a	
"Dream Maker / Euphoria"	Janet Jackson	Janet Jackson; Thomas Lumpkins	Unbreakable	2015	—N/a	
"2 Be Loved"	Janet Jackson	Janet Jackson; Thomas Lumpkins; Dwayne Abernathy, Jr.	Unbreakable	2015	—N/a	
"Take Me Away"	Janet Jackson	Janet Jackson	Unbreakable	2015	—N/a	
"Promise"	Janet Jackson	Janet Jackson	Unbreakable	2015	—N/a	
"Lessons Learned"	Janet Jackson	Janet Jackson	Unbreakable	2015	—N/a	
"Black Eagle"	Janet Jackson	Janet Jackson	Unbreakable	2015	—N/a	
"Well Traveled"	Janet Jackson	Janet Jackson	Unbreakable	2015	—N/a	
"Gon' B Alright"	Janet Jackson	Janet Jackson; Thomas Lumpkins; Arthur Lee	Unbreakable	2015	"She Comes in Colors" by Love	
"Promise of You"	Janet Jackson	Janet Jackson	Unbreakable	2015	—N/a	
"Love U 4 Life"	Janet Jackson	Janet Jackson; Thomas Lumpkins	Unbreakable	2015	—N/a	

== See also ==
- List of songs produced by Jimmy Jam & Terry Lewis
