= Ice Cream Dream =

1992 single by MC Lyte

Single by MC Lyte

from the album Mo' Money: Original Motion Picture Soundtrack
- B-side: "Ice Cream Dream" (Remix Instrumental)
- Released: October 27, 1992
- Recorded: 1992
- Genre: East Coast hip hop, new jack swing
- Length: 4:24 (Original version), 5:42 (Remix 12")
- Label: Perspective Records, A&M Records
- Songwriters: Lana Moorer; Terry Steven Lewis; James Samuel Harris III; George Clinton; Walter Morrison; Garry Shider; Allen Williams; Billy Nichols
- Producers: Jimmy Jam and Terry Lewis (Original version), Jermaine Dupri (Remix 12")

MC Lyte singles chronology
"Eyes Are the Soul" (1992)	"Ice Cream Dream" (1992)	"Ruffneck" (1993)

Music video
- "Ice Cream Dream" on YouTube

"Ice Cream Dream" is a song by American rapper MC Lyte in 1992. The song was used to promote the 1992 motion picture Mo' Money. It was written by Lyte with Jimmy Jam and Terry Lewis, famous primarily for their work with Janet Jackson, and released as single from the soundtrack album of the movie on October 27, 1992, through Jam & Lewis's label Perspective Records.

With a production oriented to the New Jack Swing sound, in the song Lyte talks about her preference for men, metaphorically comparing them to ice cream cone. Ice Cream Dream has more sexual lyrical content than their previously released singles. In 2007, a Ice Cream Dream remix in collaboration with Sugar Soul DJ Hasebe and the singer Charlie, with new lyrics by Lyte, was released as promotional single.

== Conception and composition ==
With a production oriented to the New Jack Swing sound, in the song Lyte talks about her preference for men, metaphorically comparing them to ice cream cone "Dark, handsome, six feet tall/Thirty-one flavors, I believe he’s got ‘em all." Ice Cream Dream has more sexual lyrical content than their previously released singles "Forget the chase--I'm prepared to get a taste/Licky here, licky there cuz I like it/Too much to eat--so I guess I'll bite it."

In 2018 Jam & Lewis spoke to Okayplayer about some of their most prominent production work, commenting on the song:

"The inspiration for all the songs on that soundtrack really came from the dialogue of the movie. (...) If you listen to the Mo' Money soundtrack, Damon Wayans talks about 'my ice cream dream.' He was talking about Stacey Dash. She was the actress who played his girlfriend in the film. He was talking about that, and we just thought, 'Okay. Ice Cream Dream. We like the way that sounds.' That was the idea behind the song. Then, we knew that we wanted to have, not only R&B, but we wanted to have some rap on the album. At the time, MC Lyte was one of our favorite rappers, and she was someone who Janet [Jackson] really loved also. When Janet talked, we would always listen. She'd go, 'Lyte would sound great on this.' It was like, 'Okay.' because Janet was involved with the song, "The Best Things in Life Are Free" with Luther Vandross from the same album. That was where the idea of using Lyte came from. Then, the idea was to just make something that was a hip-hop track, so that we could have a songbook. We recorded some of that at the Apollo Theater. We recorded Lyte’s vocal at the Apollo Theater. There was some show that was happening, and we were able to get her and Big Daddy Kane, and maybe someone else, but I remember those sessions all happened at the Apollo Theater which was pretty cool. Lyte loved it right away. She said, 'I love this track, it’ll work really well for the movie.' That's a record I haven't talked about [before] but I love that record. I love the track. I love Lyte on it."

The song also has Lisa Keith, who had previously collaborated as backing vocalist on songs by Herb Alpert, Janet Jackson, and The Human League, singing on her hook.

=== Samples ===
It is built around a sample of EPMD hit song "So Wat Cha Sayin'". The single features a Jermaine Dupri remix which in turn contains samples of multiple elements from the previous song "Lyte as a Rock", T La Rock and Jazzy Jay's "It's Yours" and Uncle Louie's "Like Funky Music", plus vocals of "Pee-Wee's Dance" by Joeski Love, "Put Your Love (In My Tender Care)" by Fatback Band and "The Breakdown (Part I)" by Rufus Thomas.

== Critical reception ==
In his book Reflecting Black: African-American Cultural Criticism (1993), academic and author Michael Eric Dyson described the song as "a delicious ode to erotic desire" in which Lyte "seductively embellishes a conceit drawn from quotidian experience".

In 2013 Cedric Muhammad would analyze the trajectory of Jam & Lewis for Forbes magazine, in which he would describe the song as "risque" and ask "how perfect is Lisa Keith’s voice in chorus?"

In 2017, in a retrospective review of the soundtrack album, Todd Stereo Williams of The Boombox considered Lyte's song "One of her most underrated cuts", highlighting as in its artistic maturation "she wasn't afraid to embrace R&B" even though made her first appearance as a battle rapper in the 80s.

== Track listing ==
=== US 7" Vinyl ===
A-Side

1. "Ice Cream Dream" (7" Radio Mix)

B-Side

1. "Ice Cream Dream" (Remix Radio Edit)

=== UK 12" Vinyl ===
A-Side

1. "Ice Cream Dream" (Album Version)
2. "Ice Cream Dream" (12" Remix)

B-Side

1. "Ice Cream Dream" (Straight Pass)
2. "Ice Cream Dream" (Remix Radio Edit)

=== 12" Vinyl ===
A-Side

1. "Ice Cream Dream" (Remix 12") (5:42)
2. "Ice Cream Dream" (Album Version) (4:25)
3. "Ice Cream Dream" (12" Remix)
4. "Ice Cream Dream" (Remix Radio Edit) (3:49)

=== CD Version ===
A-Side

1. "Ice Cream Dream" (7" Radio Mix)
2. "Ice Cream Dream" (Remix Radio Edit)
3. "Ice Cream Dream" (12" Remix)
4. "Ice Cream Dream" (Straight Pass)
5. "Ice Cream Dream" (Album Version)

=== Cassette ===
1. "Ice Cream Dream" (7" Radio Mix)
2. "Ice Cream Dream" (Remix Radio Edit)
3. "Ice Cream Dream" (12" Remix)
4. "Ice Cream Dream" (Straight Pass)
5. "Ice Cream Dream" (Album Version)

== Personnel ==
Credits are taken from the liner notes.

- Executive-Producer – Nat Robinson
- Mastered By – Dennis King (D.K.)
- Producer, Written-By – Audio Two (tracks: A2 to B2), King Of Chill (tracks: A1)
- Programmed By, Engineer, Music By [Music Performed By] – Audio Two
- Written-By – MC Lyte

== Charts ==
Chart (1992–93)	Peak position
US Hot Rap Songs (Billboard)	11
