= Heaven (Solo song) =

Single by Solo

from the album Solo
- Released: August 22, 1995
- Recorded: 1995
- Genre: R&B
- Length: 3:49
- Label: Perspective
- Songwriter(s): Robert Anderson; Darnell Chavis; Eunique Mack; Daniel Stokes; James Harris III; Terry Lewis; Jimmy Wright
- Producer(s): James Harris III; Terry Lewis

Solo singles chronology
"Heaven" (1995)	"Where Do U Want Me to Put It" (1995)

Music video
- "Heaven" on VH1.com

"Heaven" is a song co-written and performed by American contemporary R&B band Solo, issued as the first single from their eponymous debut studio album. The song was the band's highest chart appearance on the Billboard Hot 100, peaking at No. 42 in 1995.

The official music video for the song was directed by Alan Ferguson (under the pseudonym Sky Dalton).

== Charts ==
=== Weekly charts ===
Chart (1995)	Peak position
US Billboard Hot 100	42
US Hot R&B/Hip-Hop Songs (Billboard)	7

=== Year-end charts ===
Chart (1995)	Position
US Hot R&B/Hip-Hop Songs (Billboard)	48
