= 4 Bruthas & a Bass =

Studio album by Solo
- Released: September 22, 1998
- Genre: R&B
- Length: 61:43
- Label: Perspective
- Producer: Celebrity Status; Darren "Nitro" Clowers; Edwin "Tony" Nicholas; Gerald Levert; Henley "Jr." Regisford (exec.); McKinley Horton; Raphael Saadiq; Solo; Travon Potts

Solo chronology
Solo (1995)	4 Bruthas & a Bass (1998)

Singles from 4 Bruthas & a Bass
- 1. "Touch Me" Released: August 18, 1998

Professional ratings
Review scores
Source	Rating
AllMusic	3/5 stars

4 Bruthas & a Bass is the second studio album by American R&B group Solo, released September 22, 1998. Like the group's previous album, this album was also released on Jimmy Jam and Terry Lewis' record label, Perspective Records; however, Jam and Lewis did not produce the album and production was instead handled by Henley "Jr." Regisford. The album peaked at #123 on the Billboard 200; and its only single was "Touch Me", which peaked at #59 on the Billboard Hot 100.

== Track listing ==
No.	Title	Writer(s)	Length
1.	"Touch Me"	Robert Anderson; Darnell Chavis; Eunique Mack; Daniel Stokes; Raphael Saadiq	4:18
2.	"Nights Like This"	Robert Anderson; Darnell Chavis; Eunique Mack; Daniel Stokes; Raphael Saadiq	4:21
3.	"Luv-All-Day"	Darnell Chavis; Eunique Mack; Daniel Stokes	5:01
4.	"Forgive Me"	Travon Potts	5:28
5.	"Free-Stylin All da Woman" (Interlude)	Darnell Chavis; Eunique Mack; Daniel Stokes	1:03
6.	"Sumthin Kinda Special"	Darnell Chavis; Eunique Mack; Daniel Stokes	4:36
7.	"Let Me See the Sun"	Gerald Levert; Edwin Nicholas	4:58
8.	"Love You Down"	Darnell Chavis; Eunique Mack; Daniel Stokes	5:28
9.	"Make Me Know It"	Gerald Levert; Edwin Nicholas	4:42
10.	"Crazy Bout U"	Darnell Chavis; Darren "Nitro" Clowers; Eunique Mack; Daniel Stokes; Angie Stone	4:58
11.	"Get Off!" ( (Note: "Get Off!" contains a sample of "Clean Up Woman" by Betty Wright.))	Darnell Chavis; Darren "Nitro" Clowers; Eunique Mack; Daniel Stokes	3:57
12.	"I Hear Love Calling Me" (Interlude)	Robert Anderson; Darnell Chavis; Eunique Mack; Daniel Stokes; James H. Smith	1:31
13.	"Till Death Do Us Part" (featuring Brownstone)	Chaka Blackmon	4:51
14.	"What Would This World Be"	Ann Gore; McKinley Horton	4:56
15.	"Amen" (Interlude)	Darnell Chavis; Eunique Mack; Daniel Stokes	1:35
Total length:			1:01:43

== Chart positions ==
Chart (1998)	Peak position
US Billboard 200	123
US R&B Albums (Billboard)	25
