= Kazaam (soundtrack) =

Soundtrack album by Various artists
- Released: June 19, 1996
- Recorded: 1995
- Genre: Hip hop, R&B
- Length: 70:35
- Label: Perspective/A&M
- Producer: Jimmy Jam & Terry Lewis; Lance Alexander; Carl Carr; Joe Carr; Chad "Dr. Seuss" Elliot

Professional ratings
Review scores
Source	Rating
Allmusic	3/5 stars

Kazaam is the original soundtrack of the 1996 film starring Shaquille O'Neal. The soundtrack was released by Perspective/A&M Records on June 19, 1996. It featured two hit singles, Nathan Morris (of Boyz II Men)'s "Wishes", which made it to number 86 on the Billboard Hot 100 and number 56 on the Hot R&B/Hip-Hop singles & tracks, and Subway's "I'll Make Your Dreams Come True", which made it to number 64 on the Hot R&B/Hip-Hop singles and tracks.

The soundtrack contains P!nk's first professional recording, "Key to My Heart", which was performed by Choice, an all white R&B trio that P!nk was a member of before disbanding the group for a solo career.

== Reception ==
Artists who appeared on the soundtrack included Usher, Lisa "Left Eye" Lopes (of TLC), Immature, Quindon Tarver, DJ Spinderella, Jason Weaver, and Backstreet Boys. Shaquille O'Neal contributed three tracks, which included a duet with co-star Wade J. Robson, who played Elito in the film, entitled "We Genie". The soundtrack has a 3 star rating from AllMusic.

== Track listing ==
#	Title	Performer(s)	Length	Notes
1	I Am Kazaam	Shaquille O'Neal	1:07	
2	I'll Make Your Dreams Come True	Subway	4:40	
3	I Swear I'm In Love	Usher	4:20	
4	Wishes	Nathan Morris (of Boyz II Men)	4:47	Samples "For What It's Worth" by Buffalo Springfield
5	All Out on My Own	Shyheim	4:25	
6	No Tighter Wish	Lisa "Left Eye" Lopes (of TLC) featuring Tangi Forman	5:06	
7	Lay Tight (One for the Money)	Almighty Arrogant	5:10	
8	Show Me Your Love	Immature featuring Quindon Tarver	4:28	
9	We Genie	Shaquille O'Neal & Wade J. Robson	1:56	
10	Dance With Me	Jason Weaver	4:28	
11	If You Believe	Spinderella	4:00	
12	Key to My Heart	Choice	5:45	
13	I Get Lifted	The Barrio Boyzz featuring Fat Joe	4:30	
14	Get Down	YBTO	4:46	
15	Boys Will Be Boys	Backstreet Boys	4:15	
16	Best of Me	Jamecia	4:50	
17	Mr. Material	Shaquille O'Neal	1:50	
