= Solo (Solo album) =

Studio album by Solo
- Released: September 12, 1995
- Recorded: 1994–1995
- Studio: Flyte Tyme Studios; Edina, Minnesota; Quad Recording Studios; Axis Recording; New York City, New York
- Genre: R&B, hip hop soul, urban
- Length: 70:53
- Label: Perspective
- Producer: James Harris III, Terry Lewis (exec.); Henley "Jr." Regisford (also exec.); Alex Richbourg; the Characters; Joseph Powell; Khiry Abdulsamad; McKinley Horton

Solo chronology
Solo (1995)	4 Bruthas & a Bass (1998)

Singles from Solo
- 1. "Heaven" Released: August 22, 1995; 2. "Where Do U Want Me to Put It" Released: 1995; 3. "He's Not Good Enough" Released: 1996; 4. "Blowin' My Mind" Released: 1996

Professional ratings
Review scores
Source	Rating
AllMusic	4.5/5 stars
Muzik	5/5 stars

Solo is the debut studio album by American R&B group Solo, released September 12, 1995, via Perspective Records. The album was executive produced by Jimmy Jam and Terry Lewis, and it peaked at No. 52 on the Billboard 200.

Four singles were released from the album: "Heaven", "Where Do U Want Me to Put It", "He's Not Good Enough" and "Blowin' My Mind". "Heaven" is the group's highest chart appearance to date on the Billboard Hot 100, peaking at No. 42. The album contains covers of five songs originally recorded by Sam Cooke: "Another Saturday Night", "A Change Is Gonna Come", "Cupid", "Everybody Loves to Cha Cha Cha" and "(What a) Wonderful World". A cover of "Under the Boardwalk", originally recorded by the Drifters, was also included.

The album was certified gold by the RIAA on February 6, 1996.

== Track listing ==
- Songwriting and production credits adapted from liner notes.

No.	Title	Writer(s)	Producer(s)	Length
1.	"(What a) Wonderful World" (Sam Cooke cover)	Lou Adler, Herb Alpert, Sam Cooke		1:23
2.	"Back 2 da Street" (^{A})	Robert Anderson, Darnell Chavis, James Harris III, Terry Lewis, Eunique Mack, Alex Richbourg, Daniel Stokes, H. W. Casey, Richard Finch, James Brown, Charles Bobbitt, Bobby Byrd	Alex Richbourg, Jimmy Jam and Terry Lewis	4:06
3.	"Blowin' My Mind"	Robert Anderson, Darnell Chavis, James Harris III, Terry Lewis, Eunique Mack, Daniel Stokes	Jimmy Jam and Terry Lewis	4:42
4.	"Cupid" (Sam Cooke cover)	Sam Cooke		0:43
5.	"Heaven"	Darnell Chavis, Sergio Garcia, James Harris III, Terry Lewis, Eunique Mack, Daniel Stokes, Jimmy Wright	Jimmy Jam and Terry Lewis	3:49
6.	"Xxtra" (^{B})	Lance Alexander, James Harris III, Terry Lewis, Tony Hester, Alex Richbourg, Tony Tolbert	Jimmy Jam and Terry Lewis, Alex Richbourg (co.)	5:04
7.	"It's Such a Shame"	Ann Gore, McKinley Horton	McKinley Horton, Khiry Abdulsamad	5:30
8.	"He's Not Good Enough"	Darnell Chavis, James Harris III, Terry Lewis, McKinley Horton, Daniel Stokes	Joseph Powell	6:20
9.	"Another Saturday Night/Everybody Loves to Cha Cha Cha" (Sam Cooke cover)	Sam Cooke		1:09
10.	"Where Do U Want Me to Put It"	James Harris III, Terry Lewis, McKinley Horton	Jimmy Jam and Terry Lewis	4:03
11.	"Keep It Right Here"	Darnell Chavis, Edward King, Daniel Stokes	Joseph Powell	5:27
12.	"I'm Sorry"	Charles Farrar, Troy Taylor	The Characters	5:29
13.	"Under the Boardwalk" (The Drifters cover)	Arthur Resnick, Kenny Young		1:04
14.	"In Bed"	James Harris III, Terry Lewis	Jimmy Jam and Terry Lewis	4:05
15.	"(Last Night I Made Love) Like Never Before" (^{C})	Robert Anderson, Darnell Chavis, James Harris III, Terry Lewis, Alex Richbourg, Eunique Mack, Daniel Stokes, Curtis Mayfield	Alex Richbourg, Jimmy Jam and Terry Lewis	4:47
16.	"Prince Street"	Robert Anderson, Darnell Chavis, Eunique Mack, Daniel Stokes		0:10
17.	"Holdin' On"	Robert Anderson, Darnell Chavis, James Harris III, Terry Lewis, Eunique Mack, Daniel Stokes	Jimmy Jam and Terry Lewis	4:04
18.	"A Change Is Gonna Come" (Sam Cooke cover)	Sam Cooke	Jimmy Jam and Terry Lewis	8:53

== Samples ==
A. Contains a sample of "I Get Lifted" by KC and the Sunshine Band and "I Know You Got Soul" by Bobby Byrd.
B. Contains a sample of "In the Rain" by the Dramatics.
C. Contains a sample of "The Makings of You" by Curtis Mayfield.

== Charts ==
=== Weekly charts ===
Chart (1995–96)	Peak position
US Billboard 200	52
US Top R&B/Hip-Hop Albums (Billboard)	8

=== Year-end charts ===
Chart (1995)	Position
US Top R&B/Hip-Hop Albums (Billboard)	96
Chart (1996)	Position
US Billboard 200	172
US Top R&B/Hip-Hop Albums (Billboard)	28
