= The Best Things in Life Are Free (Luther Vandross and Janet Jackson song) =

1992 single by Luther Vandross and Janet Jackson

- Cover for the 1992 release

Single by Luther Vandross and Janet Jackson

from the album Mo' Money: Original Motion Picture Soundtrack and Design of a Decade: 1986–1996 (International edition)
- B-side: "A Little Bit of Mo' Money: The Original Motion Picture Soundtrack" (1992); "Megamix" (1995)
- Released: May 12, 1992
- Studio: Flyte Tyme (Edina, Minnesota); Aire L.A. (Glendale, California); Record Plant (Los Angeles, California)
- Genre: R&B; dance-pop; house
- Length: 4:36 (Mo' Money soundtrack w/ BBD and Ralph Tresvant); 4:04 (1995 re-issue)
- Label: Perspective; A&M
- Songwriters: Jimmy Jam and Terry Lewis; Michael Bivins; Ronnie DeVoe; Harry Wayne Casey; Richard Finch
- Producers: Jimmy Jam and Terry Lewis

Luther Vandross singles chronology
"Sometimes It's Only Love" (1992)	"The Best Things in Life Are Free" (1992)	"Little Miracles (Happen Every Day)" (1993)

Janet Jackson singles chronology
"State of the World" (1991)	"The Best Things in Life Are Free" (1992)	"That's the Way Love Goes" (1993)

Bell Biv DeVoe singles chronology
"Word to the Mutha!" (1991)	"The Best Things in Life Are Free" (1992)	"Gangsta" (1993)

Ralph Tresvant singles chronology
"Money Can't Buy You Love" (1992)	"The Best Things in Life Are Free" (1992)	"Who's the Mack" (1993)

Music video
- "The Best Things in Life Are Free" on YouTube

"The Best Things in Life Are Free" is a duet between American singers Luther Vandross and Janet Jackson, recorded for the Jimmy Jam and Terry Lewis produced soundtrack to the 1992 American film Mo' Money, starring Damon Wayans. The song was composed by Jam, Lewis, Michael Bivins, Ronnie DeVoe, Harry Wayne Casey and Richard Finch. The song was released as the soundtrack's lead single on May 12, 1992, by Perspective Records and A&M Records. Additionally, the song was remixed by David Morales, Frankie Knuckles, and CJ Mackintosh. The duet became a major hit in several countries, peaking at number two in Australia and the United Kingdom, number six in Ireland and New Zealand, number eight in Canada and Germany, and number 10 in the United States. Its music video was directed by Paris Barclay, but did not feature Vandross and Jackson. The song was nominated for the Grammy Award for Best R&B Performance by a Duo or Group with Vocals.

The song was later included on Vandross' compilations One Night with You: The Best of Love, Volume 2 and Lovesongs, as well as Jackson's own compilations Design of a Decade: 1986–1996 and Number Ones respectively. In 1995, the song was re-released as the second single from Jackson's aforementioned Design of a Decade 1986–1996 compilation album and included new remixes by Roger Sanchez, K-Klass and MK, exclusively in European countries. A further re-release followed as a limited-edition single in 1996. Jackson included the song on her 2011 tour, Number Ones, Up Close and Personal, and her 2015–2016 Unbreakable World Tour. It was also included in her 2019 Las Vegas residency Janet Jackson: Metamorphosis.

== Background and composition ==
In March 1991, Jackson signed an unprecedented $32 million contract with Virgin Records, the largest record deal at the time, although it was quickly exceeded by her brother Michael and his label, Epic Records. Prior to her first release with Virgin, Jackson was asked by Jam and Lewis to record a song for the soundtrack to the feature film Mo' Money, released in 1992 by their label Perspective Records. Jon Bream of the Star Tribune reported: "For most movie soundtracks, producers negotiate with record companies, managers and lawyers for the services of big-name singers. Like the Hollywood outsiders that they are, Edina-based Jam and Lewis went directly to such stars as Janet Jackson and Luther Vandross." It was the first all-new song Jackson recorded at the new location of Flyte Tyme Studios in Edina, Minnesota, which was completed two months after wrapping up recording on her fourth studio album Rhythm Nation 1814 in May 1989 at the original Minneapolis studio. She had done re-recordings and remixes there from 1989 to 1991.

"The Best Things in Life Are Free" is an R&B, dance-pop, and house song with a "steady beat". It is written in the key of F♯m and their vocal ranges span from the low note of F♯3 to C♯6. The song is set in common time and has a moderate tempo of 120 beats per minute. It follows a chord progression of Bm7—C♯m7—F♯7. The song contains a sample of "I Get Lifted" by George McCrae, written by Harry Wayne Casey and Richard Finch of KC & The Sunshine Band, who were given songwriting credit as a result.

== Critical reception ==
Larry Flick from Billboard magazine wrote, "First peek into the hotly anticipated soundtrack to the film Mo' Money is a glittery, star-studded pop/jack affair. Vandross and Jackson vocally swerve and weave around each other like they've been singing together for years. Added flavor comes from guest raps by Bell Biv DeVoe and Tresvant. The true kudos, however, go to the masterful Jimmy Jam and Terry Lewis, who have crafted a slammin' track that would work no matter what." Amy Linden from Entertainment Weekly commented, "While the combo of Janet Jackson and Luther Vandross may be a marketing dream, artistically it blows. The trademark busy groove that defines Janet buries Luther, who doesn’t need a crutch and who, when free of misguided arrangements, eats singers like Janet for lunch."

John Martinucci from the Gavin Report said the duo "sound great together working over this high energy song". Also Alan Jones from Music Week agreed that "it's appeal is in the super-smooth vocal combination of Janet and Luther", and named the single Pick of the Week. Another Music Week editor, Andy Beevers, felt the track is "very catchy and funky". Iestyn George from NME noted its "sweet soul tread" that "carry an equally refreshing air of simplicity." Tom Doyle from Smash Hits described it as "a smooth club number with a dreamy soul feel and a rap from the "special guests" in the middle."

== Chart performance ==
In the United States, "The Best Things in Life Are Free" debuted at number 24 on the US Billboard Hot 100 the week of May 30, 1992. Three weeks later, the song peaked at number 10 for three consecutive weeks and ended at number 41 on the year-end chart. The song also peaked at number one on the Billboard Hot R&B Singles chart.

In the United Kingdom, the song was released in August 1992 and peaked at number two on the UK Singles Chart, spending 13 weeks in the chart. It became Jackson's first top-ten hit in the UK since "Let's Wait Awhile" reached number three in 1987, and is her highest-charting single in the UK alongside "That's the Way Love Goes", which also peaked at number two the following year. The song was remixed in 1995 and re-released, reaching number seven. It was the remixed version that was included on international releases of Janet's compilation album Design of a Decade: 1986–1996. In Australia the single spent five consecutive weeks at number two on the ARIA Singles Chart, spending 18 weeks on the chart, and was ranked at number six on the year-end chart.

== Music video ==
A music video was made for "The Best Things in Life Are Free", directed by American television director, producer, and writer Paris Barclay, although neither Vandross nor Jackson appear in it. Instead, the video features Mo' Money's stars Damon Wayans and Stacey Dash, at a carnival, lip-synching to the song; Damon's brother Marlon Wayans, who also appears in Mo' Money, has a cameo appearance in the video.

Also included on the track is Michael Bivins and Ronnie DeVoe of Bell Biv DeVoe. Ralph Tresvant also has a very brief spoken line. He appears solo on the song "Money Can't Buy You Love" from the soundtrack.

== Track listings ==
=== Original version ===
"A Little Bit of Mo' Money: The Original Motion Picture Soundtrack" consists of three snippets: "Money Can't Buy You Love" by Ralph Tresvant, "Let's Just Run Away" by Johnny Gill, and "Let's Get Together (So Groovy Now)" by Krush.

- US and Japanese CD single
1. "The Best Things in Life Are Free" (classic 12-inch mix) – 5:53
2. "The Best Things in Life Are Free" (CJ's U.K. 12-inch mix) – 9:58
3. "The Best Things in Life Are Free" (Def version) – 8:41
4. "The Best Things in Life Are Free" (CJ's FXTC dub) – 6:51
5. "The Best Things in Life Are Free" (CJ's Vinyl Zone dub) – 6:49
6. "The Best Things in Life Are Free" (album version) – 4:36
- US 12-inch single

A1. "The Best Things in Life Are Free" (classic 12-inch mix) – 5:54
A2. "The Best Things in Life Are Free" (Def version) – 8:41
A3. "The Best Things in Life Are Free" (album version) – 4:36
B1. "The Best Things in Life Are Free" (CJ's U.K. 12-inch mix) – 10:01
B2. "The Best Things in Life Are Free" (CJ's FXTC dub) – 6:51
B3. "The Best Things in Life Are Free" (CJ's Vinyl Zone dub) – 6:49

- US 7-inch single

A. "The Best Things in Life Are Free" – 4:37
B. "The Best Things in Life Are Free" (no rap) – 4:27

- US cassette single
1. "The Best Things in Life Are Free" – 4:36
2. "A Little Bit of Mo' Money: The Original Motion Picture Soundtrack"
- UK CD single
1. "The Best Things in Life Are Free" (CJ's UK 7-inch with rap)
2. "The Best Things in Life Are Free" (CJ's UK 12-inch with rap)
3. "The Best Things in Life Are Free" (classic 7-inch with rap)
4. "The Best Things in Life Are Free" (classic 12-inch with rap)
5. "The Best Things in Life Are Free" (Def version)
6. "The Best Things in Life Are Free" (CJ's UK dub 1)
- UK 12-inch single

A1. "The Best Things in Life Are Free" (LP version)
A2. "The Best Things in Life Are Free" (CJ's UK 12-inch with rap)
A3. "The Best Things in Life Are Free" (CJ's Mackapella)
B1. "The Best Things in Life Are Free" (CJ's UK 12-inch with rap)
B2. "The Best Things in Life Are Free" (Def version)
B3. "The Best Things in Life Are Free" (CJ's UK dub 1)

- UK 7-inch and cassette single

A. "The Best Things in Life Are Free" (CJ's UK 7-inch with rap)
B. "The Best Things in Life Are Free" (classic 7-inch with rap)

- Australian CD and cassette single
1. "The Best Things in Life Are Free" (classic 7-inch with rap)
2. "The Best Things in Life Are Free" (classic 7-inch without rap)
3. "A Little Bit of Mo' Money: The Original Motion Picture Soundtrack"

=== 1995 remixes ===
"Megamix" consists of seven songs by Janet Jackson: "What Have You Done for Me Lately", "When I Think of You", "Escapade", "Miss You Much", "Alright", "The Pleasure Principle", and "Runaway".

- UK CD1 and cassette single
1. "The Best Things in Life Are Free" (K-Klass 7-inch)
2. "Runaway" (G Man's hip-hop mix featuring Coolio)
3. "Megamix"
- UK CD2
1. "The Best Things in Life Are Free" (K-Klass 7-inch)
2. "The Best Things in Life Are Free" (K-Klass 12-inch)
3. "The Best Things in Life Are Free" (MK 12-inch)
4. "The Best Things in Life Are Free" (S-Man Salsoul Vibe)
5. "The Best Things in Life Are Free" (C.J. Mackintosh original remix)
- French CD single
1. "The Best Things in Life Are Free" (K-Klass 7-inch)
2. "Megamix"
- German CD single
1. "The Best Things in Life Are Free" (K-Klass 7-inch) – 4:22
2. "Runaway" (Kelly's Bump & Run mix) – 8:08
- European maxi-CD single
1. "The Best Things in Life Are Free" (K-Klass 7-inch edit) – 4:22
2. "The Best Things in Life Are Free" (S-Man Salsoul Vibe) – 11:40
3. "The Best Things in Life Are Free" (K-Klass 12-inch mix) – 8:54

== Charts ==
=== Weekly charts ===
Weekly chart performance for "The Best Things in Life Are Free"
Chart (1992–1995)	Peak position
Australia (ARIA)	2
Canada Top Singles (RPM)	8
Canada Dance/Urban (RPM)	2
Canada Retail Singles (The Record)	4
Canada Contemporary Hit Radio (The Record)	4
Europe (Eurochart Hot 100)	12
Europe (European Dance Radio)	2
Germany (GfK)	8
Ireland (IRMA)	6
Netherlands (Dutch Top 40)	24
Netherlands (Single Top 100)	20
New Zealand (Recorded Music NZ)	6
Scottish Singles Sales (Official Charts) 1995 remix	14
Sweden (Sverigetopplistan)	36
Switzerland (Schweizer Hitparade)	32
UK Singles (Official Charts)	2
UK Singles (Official Charts) 1995 remix	7
UK Airplay (Music Week)	1
UK Dance (Music Week)	3
UK Club Chart (Music Week)	2
UK Club Chart (Music Week) 1995 remix	1
US Billboard Hot 100	10
US Dance Club Songs (Billboard)	3
US Dance Singles Sales (Billboard)	39
US Hot R&B/Hip-Hop Songs (Billboard)	1
US Cash Box Top 100	9

=== Year-end charts ===
1992 year-end chart performance for "The Best Things in Life Are Free"
Chart (1992)	Position
Australia (ARIA)	6
Canada Top Singles (RPM)	94
Canada Dance/Urban (RPM)	11
Europe (Eurochart Hot 100)	79
Europe (European Dance Radio)	4
Europe (European Hit Radio)	31
Germany (Media Control)	63
New Zealand (RIANZ)	44
UK Singles (OCC)	17
UK Airplay (Music Week)	2
UK Club Chart (Music Week)	17
US Billboard Hot 100	41
US Hot R&B Singles (Billboard)	48

1995 year-end chart performance for "The Best Things in Life Are Free"
Chart (1995)	Position
UK Club Chart (Music Week) with "Runaway"	4

== Certifications ==
Certifications for "The Best Things in Life Are Free"
Region	Certification	Certified units/sales
Australia (ARIA)	Platinum	70,000^{^}
United Kingdom (BPI) 1992 physical sales	Silver	200,000^{^}
United Kingdom (BPI) sales + streams since 2009	Silver	200,000^{‡}
^{^} Shipments figures based on certification alone.^{‡} Sales+streaming figures based on certification alone.

== Release history ==
Release history and formats for "The Best Things in Life Are Free"
Region	Version	Date	Format(s)	Label(s)	Ref.
United States	Original	May 12, 1992	7-inch vinyl; 12-inch vinyl; CD; cassette	Perspective; A&M	
United Kingdom	Original	August 3, 1992	7-inch vinyl; 12-inch vinyl; CD; cassette	Perspective; A&M	
United Kingdom	1995 remixes	December 4, 1995	CD; cassette	A&M	
United Kingdom	1995 remixes	December 18, 1995	12-inch vinyl double pack	A&M	

== See also ==
- List of number-one R&B singles of 1992 (U.S.)

== Bibliography ==
- Bronson, Fred (2003), The Billboard Book of Number 1 Hits, Billboard Books, ISBN 0823076776
- Dyson, Michael Eric (1993), Reflecting Black: African-American Cultural Criticism, University of Minnesota Press, ISBN 0816621411
- Whitburn, Joel (2004), Top R&B/Hip-Hop Singles: 1942–2004, Record Research Inc., ISBN 0898201608
