= Mo' Money (soundtrack) =

Soundtrack album by Various artists
- Released: June 23, 1992
- Recorded: 1991–1992
- Genres: Hip hop, R&B, dance, new jack swing
- Length: 72:38
- Labels: Perspective, A&M
- Producers: Jimmy Jam and Terry Lewis (exec.), Lance Alexander, The Bomb Squad, Color Me Badd, Jellybean Johnson, Mint Condition, Prof. T.

Singles from Mo' Money
- 1. "Money Can't Buy You Love" Released: June 30, 1992; 2. "The Best Things in Life Are Free" Released: September 29, 1992; 3. "I Adore You" Released: October 13, 1992; 4. "Let's Get Together (So Groovy Now)" Released: October 13, 1992; 5. "Ice Cream Dream" Released: October 27, 1992; 6. "Joy" Released: November 24, 1992; 7. "Forever Love" Released: November 24, 1992

Mo' Money: Original Motion Picture Soundtrack is the soundtrack to the 1992 film of the same name. It was released June 23, 1992, on Perspective Records. The soundtrack peaked at six on the Billboard 200 chart. By September 1992, it was certified platinum in sales by the RIAA, after sales exceeding 1,000,000 copies in the United States.

== Release and reception ==
Professional ratings
Review scores
Source	Rating
AllMusic	3/5 stars
Los Angeles Times	2/4 stars

The album peaked at number six on the U.S. Billboard 200 and reached the second spot on the R&B albums chart. The album was certified platinum in September 1992.

Adam Greenberg of AllMusic gave the soundtrack a mixed review, stating that "the album is a perfect blend for a fan of the early-'90s R&B sound, but doesn't really meet the same standard as music of later years."

== Track listing ==
No.	Title	Writer(s)	Producer(s)	Length
1.	"Mo' Money Groove" (Mo' Money All-Stars: Damon Wayans, Johnny Gill, Ralph Tresvant, Krush, and Lo-Key?)	James Harris III, Terry Lewis	Jimmy Jam and Terry Lewis	5:44
2.	"For You? Free"			0:10
3.	"The Best Things in Life Are Free" (Luther Vandross, Janet Jackson feat. Bell Biv DeVoe and Ralph Tresvant)	Harris III, Lewis, Michael Bivins, Ronnie DeVoe, Ralph Tresvant	Jimmy Jam and Terry Lewis	4:36
4.	"Gimme My 2 Dollars"			0:16
5.	"Ice Cream Dream" (MC Lyte)	Harris III, Lewis, Lana Moorer	Jimmy Jam and Terry Lewis	4:25
6.	"Amber, Let's Go"			0:18
7.	"Let's Just Run Away" (Johnny Gill)	Harris III, Lewis, Lance Alexander, Tony Tolbert	Jimmy Jam and Terry Lewis, Lance Alexander, Prof. T	5:11
8.	"Don't Throw That Away"			0:20
9.	"I Adore You" (Caron Wheeler)	Harris III, Lewis, Wheeler	Jimmy Jam and Terry Lewis	4:44
10.	"Get Off My Back" (Public Enemy feat. Flavor Flav)	Hank Shocklee, Keith Shocklee, Gary Rinaldo, William Drayton Jr.	The Bomb Squad	4:52
11.	"Forever Love" (Color Me Badd)	Harris III, Lewis, Kevin Thornton, Sam Watters, Bryan Abrams, Mark Calderon	Jimmy Jam and Terry Lewis, Color Me Badd	5:10
12.	"Fun and Games With the Mail Boy"			0:14
13.	"Money Can't Buy You Love" (Ralph Tresvant)	Harris III, Lewis, Tresvant	Jimmy Jam and Terry Lewis	6:00
14.	"Hi Johnny Baby"			0:07
15.	"Let's Get Together (So Groovy Now)" (Krush)	Harris III, Lewis, Tolbert	Jimmy Jam and Terry Lewis	5:04
16.	"Joy" (Sounds of Blackness)	Alexander, Tolbert	Jimmy Jam and Terry Lewis, Alexander, Prof. T	5:45
17.	"A Sister Just Like Her"			0:16
18.	"The New Style" (Jimmy Jam and Terry Lewis)	Harris III, Lewis	Jimmy Jam and Terry Lewis	4:15
19.	"I Think I Mightta Gotta Job"			0:16
20.	"A Job Ain't Nuthin' But Work" (Big Daddy Kane feat. Lo-Key?)	Harris III, Lewis, Antonio Hardy, Alexander, Tolbert, Darron Story	Jimmy Jam and Terry Lewis, Alexander, Prof. T	5:03
21.	"My Dreams Need Detail"			0:09
22.	"My Dear" (Mint Condition)	Harris III, Lewis, Stokley Williams, Jeffrey Allen, Homer O'Dell, Keri Lewis, Ricky Kinchen, Larry Waddell	Jimmy Jam and Terry Lewis, Mint Condition	5:09
23.	"Big Time"			0:06
24.	"Brother Will" (The Harlem Yacht Club)	Harris III, Lewis, Garry Johnson, Mark Haynes, Frank Stribbling	Jellybean Johnson, Jimmy Jam and Terry Lewis	4:28

Sample credits

- "Mo' Money Groove" contains a sample of "You Can't Love Me If You Don't Respect Me", written by James Brown and Lyn Collins, and performed by Lyn Collins; a sample of "Get Me Back On Time, Engine No. 9", written by Kenneth Gamble and Leon Huff, and performed by Wilson Pickett; a sample of "Welcome to the Terrordome", written by Hank Shocklee, Keith Shocklee and Carlton Ridenhour, and performed by Public Enemy; and a replay of "Soul Power", written by James Brown and Fred Wesley, and performed by James Brown.
- "The Best Things in Life Are Free" contains a sample of "I Get Lifted", written by Harry Wayne Casey and Richard Finch, and performed by George McCrae.
- "Ice Cream Dream" contains a sample of "So Wat Cha Sayin'", written by Erick Sermon and Parrish Smith, and performed by EPMD; a sample of "One Nation Under a Groove", written by George Clinton, Walter Morrison and Garry Shider, and performed by Funkadelic; a sample of "If It Don't Turn You On (You Oughta' Leave It Alone)", written by Billy Nichols and Allen J. Williams, and performed by B.T. Express; a sample of "FX & Scratches", written and performed by Simon Harris; a sample of "Impeach the President", written by Roy Hammond, and performed by The Honey Drippers; and a sample of "Fairplay", written by Trevor Romeo, Nellee Hooper and Rose Windross, and performed by Soul II Soul feat. Rose Windross.
- "I Adore You" contains a sample of cover version of "Don't Make Me Over", written by Burt Bacharach and Hal David, and performed by Sybil, originally performed by Dionne Warwick.
- "Get Off My Back" contains a sample of "Heartbreaker (Part I, Part II)", written by Roger Troutman, and performed by Zapp; a sample of "(Not Just) Knee Deep". written by George Clinton, and performed by Funkadelic; and a sample of "Give Up the Funk (Tear the Roof Off the Sucker)", written by Jerome Brailey, George Clinton and Bootsy Collins, and performed by Parliament.
- "Let's Get Together (So Groovy Now)", contains a sample of "Reach Out of the Darkness", written by Jim Post, and performed by Friend and Lover.
- "The New Style", contains a drum sample of "Last Night Changed It All (I Really Had a Ball)", written by Joseph B. Wheeler, and performed by Esther Williams.
- "A Job Ain't Nuthin' But Work", contains a sample of "So Ruff, So Tuff", written by Roger Troutman and Larry Troutman, and performed by Roger; a sample of "Best of My Love", written by Maurice White and Al McKay, and performed by The Emotions; a sample of "Work That Sucker to Death", written by George Clinton, Bootsy Collins, Jeffrey Mitchell, Rahni Harris, Terry Philips and Ralph Hunt Jr., and performed by Xavier feat. George Clinton and Bootsy Collins; a sample of "Tough", written by James Biggs Moore III, Robert Ford Jr., Lawrence Smith and Russell Simmons, and performed by Kurtis Blow; a sample of "These Are The J.B.'s", written by James Brown and The J.B.'s, and performed by The J.B.'s; a sample of "The Champ", written by Harry Palmer, and performed by The Mohawks; a sample of "Rated X", written by Robert Bell, Ronald Bell, Donald Boyce, George Brown, Robert Mickens, Claydes Smith, Dennis Thomas, Curtis Williams and Richard Westfield, and performed by Kool & the Gang; and a replay of "Let's Work", written and performed by Prince.

== Charts ==
=== Weekly charts ===
Chart performance for Mo' Money
Chart (1992-1993)	Peak position
Australian Albums (ARIA)	39
Canada Top Albums/CDs (RPM)	16
German Albums (Offizielle Top 100)	78
New Zealand Albums (RMNZ)	46
Swedish Albums (Sverigetopplistan)	50
US Billboard 200	6
US Top R&B/Hip-Hop Albums (Billboard)	2

=== Year-end charts ===
Year-end chart performance for Mo' Money
Chart (1992)	Position
Canada Top Albums/CDs (RPM)	76
US Billboard 200	95
US Top R&B/Hip-Hop Albums (Billboard)	28

=== Singles ===
Year	Single	Peak chart positions						
Year	Single	U.S. Billboard Hot 100	U.S. Dance Music/Club Play Singles	U.S. Hot Dance Music/Maxi-Singles Sales	U.S. Hot R&B/Hip-Hop Singles & Tracks	U.S. Hot Rap Singles	U.S. Rhythmic Top 40	U.S. Top 40 Mainstream
1992	"Money Can't Buy You Love"	54	—	—	2	—	—	—
1992	"Forever Love"	15	—	—	—	—	8	16
1992	"The Best Things in Life Are Free"	10	3	39	1	—	—	5
1992	"I Adore You"	—	—	—	12	—	—	—
1993	"Ice Cream Dream"	—	—	—	—	11	—	—

"—" denotes releases that did not chart.

== Certifications ==
Region	Certification	Certified units/sales
Canada (Music Canada)	Gold	50,000^{^}
United States (RIAA)	Platinum	1,000,000^{^}
^{^} Shipments figures based on certification alone.

== Personnel ==
Information taken from Allmusic.

- arranging – Lance Alexander, Big Daddy Kane, Color Me Badd, Flavor Flav, The Flow, Gary G-Wiz, Gary Hines, Janet Jackson, Jimmy Jam, Jellybean Johnson, Terry Lewis, MC Lyte, O'Dell, Hank Shocklee, Keith Shocklee, Stokley, Darron Story, Ralph Tresvant, Luther Vandross, Caron Wheeler
- art direction – Richard Frankel
- assistant(s) – Kyle Bess, Eric Butler, Kimm James, Mike Scotella, Scott Weatherspoon, Bradley Yost
- bass – Mark Haynes
- composing – Lew Brown, Kirk Franklin, Anthony Smith, A. Wheaton
- cover photo – Bret Lopez
- design – Richard Frankel, Brian Johnson
- dialogue – Ashley Jackson, Christine Williams, Christy Williams
- drum programming – Lance Alexander, Jimmy Jam, O'Dell
- drums – Lance Alexander, Jellybean Johnson, Stokley Williams
- editing – David Rideau
- effects – Jimmy Jam
- engineering – Gary Bell, Kyle Bess, Bruce Botnick, Eric Butler, Weldon Cochren, Ollie Cotton, Bob Fudjinski, Brian Gardner, Eve Glabman, Steve Hodge, Michael Hyde, Mickey Isley, Kimm James, Bill Lazerus, Paul Logas Jr., Kiki Nervil, David Rideau, Mike Scotella, Ray Seville, Ray Shields, Kim Spikes, Scott Weatherspoon, Bradley Yost
- engineering assistant(s) – Kyle Bess, Eric Butler, Kimm James, Mike Scotella, Bradley Yost
- executive production – Jimmy Jam, Terry Lewis
- guitar – Lance Alexander, Jellybean Johnson, Frank Stribbling
- keyboard programming – Jimmy Jam
- keyboards – Lance Alexander, Floyd Fisher, Jimmy Jam, O'Dell
- mastering – Brian Gardner
- mixing – Steve Hodge, Paul Logus, Paul Logus Jr., David Rideau
- multi-instruments – The Flow, Jimmy Jam, Terry Lewis
- musician – The Flow, Jimmy Jam, Terry Lewis, Leslie Organ, James "Big Jim" Wright
- organ – James "Big Jim" Wright
- percussion – Lance Alexander, Jellybean Johnson
- performer(s) – Bell Biv DeVoe, Big Daddy Kane, Color Me Badd, Johnny Gill, Janet Jackson, Lo-Key, MC Lyte, Mint Condition, Public Enemy, Sounds of Blackness, Ralph Tresvant, Luther Vandross, Caron Wheeler
- photography – Bret Lopez
- production – Lance Alexander, Bomb Squad Prod., Color Me Badd, Gary G-Wiz, Jimmy Jam, Jellybean Johnson, Terry Lewis, Mint Condition, Prof T., Hank Shocklee, Keith Shocklee
- production coordination – Sue Owens
- programming – Lance Alexander, Gary Bell, The Flow, Gary G-Wiz, Michael Hyde, Jimmy Jam, Jellybean Johnson, Terry Lewis, O'Dell, Prof T., Keith Shocklee, Stokley
- rapping – Michael Bivins, Ronnie DeVoe, Ralph Tresvant
- rhythm – Jimmy Jam, Terry Lewis
- rhythm arranging – Lance Alexander, Color Me Badd, The Flow, Gary G-Wiz, Jimmy Jam, Jellybean Johnson, Terry Lewis, O'Dell, Prof T., Keith Shocklee
- scratching – DJ Icy Rock
- sequencing – Lance Alexander, The Flow, Gary G-Wiz, Jimmy Jam, Jellybean Johnson, Terry Lewis, O'Dell, Prof T., David Rideau, Keith Shocklee, Stokley, Scott Weatherspoon
- sequencing assistant – Scott Weatherspoon
- soloist – Frank Stribbling
- spoken word – Ashley Jackson, Christy Williams
- synclavier – Gary Bell, Michael Hyde
- synclavier programming – Gary Bell, Michael Hyde
- turntables – DJ Icy Rock
- vocal arranging – Lance Alexander, Big Daddy Kane, Color Me Badd, Flavor Flav, The Flow, Gary Hines, Janet Jackson, Jimmy Jam, Jellybean Johnson, Krush, Terry Lewis, MC Lyte, O'Dell, Prof T., Hank Shocklee, Stokley, Darron Story, Ralph Tresvant, Luther Vandross, Caron Wheeler, Stokley Williams
- vocals – Big Daddy Kane, Color Me Badd, Flavor Flav, Johnny Gill, Ashley Jackson, Janet Jackson, J.R.(John Cleve Richardson-Harlem Yacht Club), Krush, MC Lyte, Ann Nesby, Ange Smith, Stokley, Ralph Tresvant, Luther Vandross, Caron Wheeler, Christine Williams, Stokley Williams
- vocals (background) – Joey Elias, Flavortons, Johnny Gill, Ashley Jackson, J.R.(John Cleve Richardson), Lisa Keith, Krush, Terry Lewis, Lo-Key, Mint Condition, Prof T., Ange Smith, Sounds of Blackness, Ralph Tresvant, Damon Wayans, Caron Wheeler, Christine Williams
