= How Stella Got Her Groove Back (soundtrack) =

How Stella Got Her Groove Back: Music from the Motion Picture

Soundtrack album by Various artists
- Released: August 11, 1998
- Recorded: 1998
- Genres: Hip-hop; R&B; reggae
- Length: 66:07
- Label: Flyte Tyme
- Producers: Jimmy Jam and Terry Lewis; Jerry Duplessis; Wyclef Jean

Professional ratings
Review scores
Source	Rating
AllMusic	4/5 stars

How Stella Got Her Groove Back: Music from the Motion Picture is the soundtrack to the 1998 film, How Stella Got Her Groove Back. It was released on August 11, 1998, through Flyte Tyme Records and consisted mainly of R&B and reggae music. The album was entirely produced by the production duo, Jimmy Jam and Terry Lewis with additional help from Wyclef Jean & Jerry Duplessis as well as Salaam Remi.

The soundtrack peaked at number eight on the Billboard 200 albums chart and number three on the Top R&B/Hip-Hop Albums chart, and was certified gold on September 22, 1998, by the RIAA.

Three singles were released from the album : "Luv Me, Luv Me", "Beautiful" and "Your Home Is in My Heart".

== Track listing ==
All tracks produced and arranged by Jimmy Jam and Terry Lewis, with additional producers listed below.

No.	Title	Writer(s)	Producer(s)	Length
1.	"Jazzie B. Intro" (Jazzie B)	James Harris III; Terry Lewis; Caron Wheeler; Beresford Romeo		0:14
2.	"Mastablasta '98" (Stevie Wonder and Wyclef Jean)	Stevie Wonder; Wyclef Jean; Jerry Duplessis	Wyclef Jean; Jerry Duplessis	4:46
3.	"Luv Me, Luv Me" (Shaggy featuring Janet Jackson)	Harris; Lewis; Orville Burrell; Alex Richbourg; Roy C. Hammond; Norman Whitfield		5:56
4.	"Beautiful" (Mary J. Blige)	Harris; Lewis; Mary J. Blige		6:29
5.	"Never Say Never Again" (K-Ci & JoJo)	Harris; Lewis; James Wright		5:21
6.	"Makes Me Sweat" (Big Punisher and Beenie Man)	Moses Davis; Christopher Rios; Michael Hutchence; Andrew Farriss		4:57
7.	"Your Home Is in My Heart (Stella's Love Theme)" (Boyz II Men featuring Chanté Moore)	Harris; Lewis		5:01
8.	"Free Again" (Soul II Soul featuring Caron Wheeler and Jazzie B)	Harris; Lewis; Wheeler; Romeo		6:17
9.	"Make My Body Hot" (Diana King)	Harris; Lewis; Wright; Diana King		5:17
10.	"The Art of Seduction" (Maxi Priest)	Harris; Lewis; Max Elliott		5:07
11.	"Let Me Have You" (Me'Shell Ndegéocello)	Me'Shell Ndegéocello	Me'Shell Ndegéocello (co.)	3:08
12.	"Dance for Me" (Kevin Ford featuring Rufus Blaq)	Harris; Lewis; Kevin Ford	Kevin Ford (co.)	5:09
13.	"Escape to Jamaica" (Lady Saw featuring Nadine Sutherland)	Rupert Holmes; Marion Hall	Salaam Remi (co.); Eddison Elektrik (co.)	3:46
14.	"Jazzie's Groove" (Jazzie B)	Harris; Lewis; Wheeler; Romeo		4:39

Sample credits

- "Mastablasta '98" contains elements from "(Fallin Like) Dominoes" (Harold Clayton, Mabaji, Sigidi), performed by Donald Byrd.
- "Luv Me, Luv Me" contains:
  - elements from "Impeach the President" (Roy C. Hammond), performed by The Honeydrippers.
  - resung elements from "Ooh Boy" (Norman Whitfield).
- "Makes Me Sweat" contains elements of "Need You Tonight" (Michael Hutchence, Andrew Farriss).

== Charts ==
=== Weekly charts ===
Chart (1998)	Peak position
US Billboard 200	8
US Top R&B/Hip-Hop Albums (Billboard)	3

=== Year-end charts ===
Chart (1998)	Position
US Billboard 200	151
US Top R&B/Hip-Hop Albums (Billboard)	75

== Certifications ==
Region	Certification	Certified units/sales
United States (RIAA)	Gold	500,000^{^}
^{^} Shipments figures based on certification alone.
