= Solo (R&B group) =

American R&B/soul band

- Origin: New York City, New York, United States
- Genres: R&B
- Years active: 1995–present
- Label: Perspective
- Members: Robert Anderson; Darnell Chavis; Eunique Mack; Daniele Stokes
- Website: www.solothegroup.com

Solo is an American R&B musical group from New York, New York. The original members were Robert Anderson, Darnell Chavis, Eunique Mack and Dan Stokes.

The group recorded their eponymous debut album in Minneapolis, and released it in 1995. Released on Perspective Records, the album featured production primarily by Jimmy Jam and Terry Lewis. The album produced four singles: "Heaven", "Where Do U Want Me to Put It", "He's Not Good Enough" and "Blowin' My Mind". It was eventually certified gold.

Solo released their second album, 4 Bruthas & a Bass, in 1998. The album produced only one single, "Touch Me", which peaked at No. 59 on the Billboard Hot 100. 3.0 Rebooted Deluxe was released in 2015.

== Discography ==
=== Albums ===
Year	Album	Peak chart positions		Certification
Year	Album	U.S. 200	U.S. R&B	Certification
1995	Solo	52	8	US: Gold
1998	4 Bruthas & a Bass	123	25	—

=== Singles ===
Year	Song	Peak chart positions				Album
Year	Song	U.S. Hot 100	U.S. R&B	U.S. Dance	UK	Album
1995	"Heaven"	42	7	19	35	Solo
1995	"Where Do U Want Me to Put It"	50	8	3	45	Solo
1996	"He's Not Good Enough"	—	50	—	—	Solo
1996	"Blowin' My Mind"	—	—	—	—	Solo
1998	"Touch Me"	59	26	3	—	4 Bruthas & a Bass
