= Condensate (album) =

Studio album by The Original 7ven
- Released: October 18, 2011
- Recorded: Flyte Tyme (Santa Monica, California); Bellavenix (Winnetka, California)
- Genre: Funk
- Length: 67:08
- Label: Saguaro Road
- Producer: Jimmy Jam & Terry Lewis; Jesse Johnson

The Original 7ven chronology
Pandemonium (1990)	Condensate (2011)

Professional ratings
Review scores
Source	Rating
AllMusic	3.5/5 stars

Condensate is the fifth studio album by the American funk ensemble The Original 7ven, formerly known as The Time. Released on October 18, 2011, the album was the group's first release in 21 years. Condensate peaked at number 58 on the US Billboard 200 album chart and number 10 on the US Top R&B/Hip-Hop Albums chart. "#Trendin" was also released as a single and reached number 77 on the US Hot R&B/Hip-Hop Songs chart.

== Track listing ==
No.	Title	Writer(s)	Producer(s)	Length
1.	"O7ven Intro"	James Harris III; Terry Lewis	Jimmy Jam; Terry Lewis	4:42
2.	"Strawberry Lake"	Morris Day; Harris; Lewis	Jam; Lewis	5:09
3.	"O7ven Press Conference"	Harris; Lewis	Jam; Lewis	1:01
4.	"Condensate"	Harris; Lewis	Jam; Lewis	3:09
5.	"#Trendin"	Harris; Lewis	Jam; Lewis	4:08
6.	"If I Was Yo Man"	Day; Harris; Lewis	Jam; Lewis	5:35
7.	"Role Play"	Day; Harris; Jesse Johnson; Lewis	Jam; Johnson; Lewis	4:44
8.	"Sick"	Harris; Johnson; Lewis	Jam; Johnson; Lewis	4:19
9.	"Lifestyle"	Day; Harris; Johnson; Lewis	Jam; Johnson; Lewis	5:10
10.	"Faithful"	Harris; Lewis	Jam; Lewis	4:40
11.	"Cadillac"	Harris; Lewis	Jam; Lewis	3:51
12.	"AYDKMN"	Harris; Johnson; Lewis	Jam; Johnson; Lewis	5:13
13.	"One Step"	Harris; Lewis	Jam; Lewis	3:35
14.	"Toast to the Party Girl"	Harris; Lewis	Jam; Lewis	5:34
15.	"Hey Yo"	Day; Harris; Lewis	Jam; Lewis	4:32
16.	"GoHomeToYoMan"	Harris; Lewis; Monte Moir	Jam; Lewis	5:29

== Personnel ==
The Time

- Morris Day – lead and backing vocals
- Jesse Johnson – guitar, backing vocals
- Jimmy Jam – keyboards, backing vocals
- Monte Moir – keyboards, backing vocals
- Terry Lewis – bass guitar, backing and additional lead vocals
- Jellybean Johnson – drums, percussion
- Jerome Benton – percussion, backing vocals

Additional personnel

- Sue Ann Carwell – backing vocals
- Treasure Davis – backing vocals
- Carla Carter – backing vocals
- Matt Marrin, Tremaine Williams, Jesse Johnson – recording engineer
- Matt Marrin, Jesse Johnson – mixing
- Jimmy Jam, Terry Lewis, Mike Jason, Michael Mitchell, Bruce Walker – executive producer
- Robert Vosgien – mastering
- Christopher Voelker – photography
- Phil Yarnall – design

== Charts ==
Chart performance for Condensate
Chart (2011)	Peak position
US Billboard 200	58
US Top R&B/Hip-Hop Albums (Billboard)	10
