= Perspective Records =

American record label

- Parent company: Universal Music Group
- Founded: 1991
- Founder: James Harris, Terry Lewis
- Status: Active
- Distributors: A&M Records (1991-1999); Virgin Music Group (2018-present)
- Genre: Rhythm and blues; gospel; hip hop
- Country of origin: U.S.
- Location: Los Angeles, California

Perspective Records is an American record label, launched in 1991 by the producing team Jimmy Jam & Terry Lewis, through a joint venture with A&M Records—which Jam & Lewis had had a prosperous working relationship with throughout the 1980s, with several of its major acts including Janet Jackson, The Human League, and label founder Herb Alpert.

Acts on Perspective's roster included Bobby Ross Avila, Smooth, Mint Condition, Lo-Key, Solo, Sounds of Blackness, Young Zee, and Ann Nesby. From 1993 to 1996, A&M Records released most of its own urban acts through Perspective. Rapper Tech N9ne was one of the signees for the label, however he was released from the label due to creative differences. In 1997, Jam and Lewis resigned as the label's CEOs, but remained consultants. Over the next year, Perspective continued to release recordings by the current artists for the sake of fulfilling contractual obligations with them. The company was dismantled, and absorbed into A&M Records, in early 1999—per the merger of A&M's PolyGram parent and Universal Music Group.

In 2018, Jam & Lewis reactivated Perspective Records under its current distributor, Virgin Music Label & Artist Services. The first album released under the label since 1998 was Peabo Bryson's album Stand For Love. In 2019, Mint Condition lead singer Stokley Williams signed to Perspective for the second time as a solo artist to release his second album, Sankofa.

== Albums released on Perspective Records ==
=== Sounds of Blackness ===
- The Evolution of Gospel (1991)
- Africa to America: The Journey of the Drum (1994)
- Time for Healing (1997)

=== Lo-Key? ===
- Where Dey At? (1992)
- Back 2 Da House (1994)

=== Mint Condition ===
- Meant to Be Mint (1991)
- From the Mint Factory (1993)
- Definition of a Band (1996)
- The Collection (1991-1998) (1998)

=== Drama ===
- Open Invitation (1994)

=== 4.0 ===
- 4.0 (1997)

=== Rufus Blaq ===
- Credentials (1998)

=== Smooth ===
- Reality (1998)

=== Bobby Ross Avila ===
- My Destiny (1993)

=== Raja-Nee ===
- Hot & Ready (1994)

=== Solo ===
- Solo (1995)
- 4 Bruthas & a Bass (1998)

=== Ann Nesby ===
- I'm Here for You (1996)

=== Lisa Keith ===
- Walkin' in the Sun (1993)

=== Peabo Bryson ===
- Stand For Love (2018)

=== Stokley ===
- Sankofa (2021)

== Soundtracks ==
- Mo' Money (1992)
- Kazaam (1996)

== Shelved albums ==
=== Pudgee Tha Phat Bastard ===
- King Of New York (recorded in 1996, released in 2015 under Back 2 Da Source Records)

=== Young Zee ===
- Musical Meltdown (recorded in 1996, released in 2015)

== See also ==
- List of record labels
