= Lo-Key? =

American musical group

- Origin: Kansas City, Missouri, U.S., Minneapolis, Minnesota, U.S.
- Genres: R&B, hip hop, new jack swing
- Years active: 1991–present
- Labels: Perspective
- Members: Andre "Dre" Shepard; Darron "D" Story; Tony "Prof-T" Tolbert; Tyrone "T-Bone" Yarbrough
- Past members: Lance Alexander

Lo-Key? is an American hip hop/R&B group that formed in Kansas City, Missouri and Minneapolis, Minnesota. Their single, "I Got a Thang 4 Ya!" (1993), reached No. 1 on the Billboard Hot R&B Singles chart, and No. 27 on the Billboard Hot 100 chart.

== History ==
Lo-Key? formed in Kansas City, Missouri and Minneapolis, Minnesota, consisting of singer/trumpeter Darron "D" Story, singer/multi-instrumentalist Andre "Dre" Shepard, bassist Tyrone "T-Bone" Yarbrough, producer/keyboardist Lance Alexander and rapper/singer Tony "Prof-T" Tolbert. The group honed their skills on the Minneapolis club circuit, where Alexander and Tolbert became in-house producers for Jimmy Jam & Terry Lewis' Flyte Tyme Productions. The group signed with Jam & Lewis' record label, Perspective Records, and released their debut album, Where Dey At?, on October 6, 1992. They scored a hit with the single "I Got A Thang 4 Ya!" in 1992, which spent a week at No. 1 on the Billboard Hot R&B Singles chart, and reached No. 27 on the Hot 100. Arthur Jafa, director of photography for the independent film Daughters of the Dust (1991), directed the video for the single. In 1992, their song (“A Job Ain’t Nuthin But Work”) featuring rapper Big Daddy Kane appeared on the movie soundtrack of the film “Mo’ Money”.

In 1994, Lo-key released their sophomore album, “Back 2 Da Howse” which didn’t make a lot of impact on the album charts like their previous album due to changes in their management. The only singles to chart from the album were the singles “Tasty”, which peaked at No. 50 and “Good Ole Fashion Love”, which peaked at No. 54 on the billboard’s r&b chart. In 1995, the group disbanded, and each member of the group went to make their own impact in the music business.

Alexander and Tolbert were also successful songwriters and producers in their own right. Among the hit songs they produced for other artists were "Butta Love" by the group Next, "Love Makes No Sense" for Alexander O'Neal, "I Wish" for Shanice and "Strawberries" for Smooth. Tolbert continued to collaborate with Jimmy Jam & Terry Lewis, contributing as a songwriter and background vocalist on albums by Earth, Wind & Fire, Janet Jackson and Usher. Meanwhile, Lance Alexander went on to found his own label called Baby Honey Records and teamed up with Minneapolis producer Christopher Starr to form the group V.IP. The group released the single entitled Lil Mama How Ya Do Dat featuring Juvenile.

In 2018, most of the original members of lo-key, Tony, Darron, Tyrone reunited except for Lance Alexandre, so he was replaced by Anthony Saunders, and they still perform with each other today and they have been working on new music which has yet to be released, but as of 2025, they still perform with each other today in concerts and shows.

== Discography ==
=== Albums ===
- Where Dey At? (Perspective Records, 1992) No. 121 Billboard 200, No. 18 US R&B Chart
- Back 2 Da House (Perspective Records, 1994) No. 64 US R&B Chart

=== Singles ===
- "Attention: The Shawanda Story" (1992)
- "I Got a Thang 4 Ya!" (No. 27 Billboard Hot 100, No. 1 US R&B Singles, 1992)
- "Hey There Pretty Lady" (No. 56 US R&B Singles, 1993)
- "Sweet on U" (No. 91 Billboard Hot 100, No. 13 US R&B Singles, 1993)

== See also ==
- List of number-one R&B singles of 1992 (U.S.)
