= Jimmy Jam and Terry Lewis =

American R&B songwriting production team

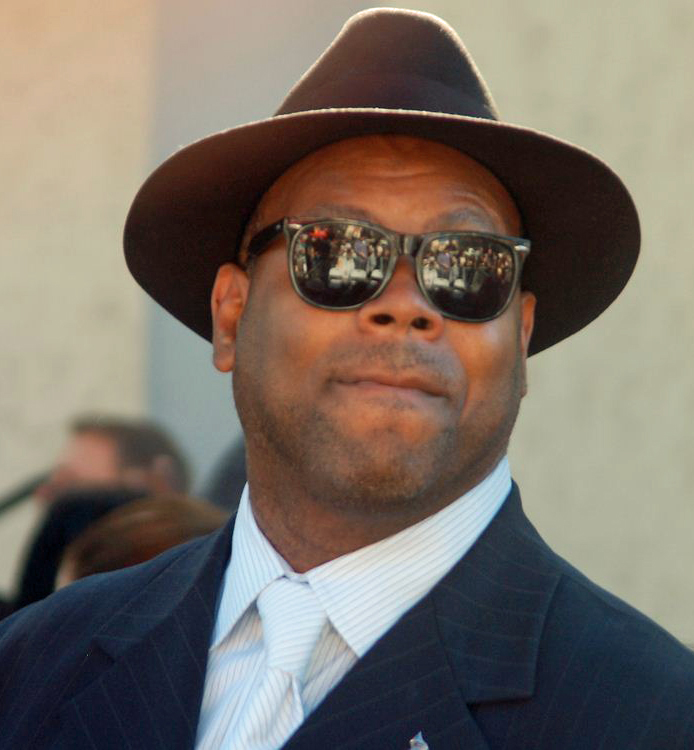
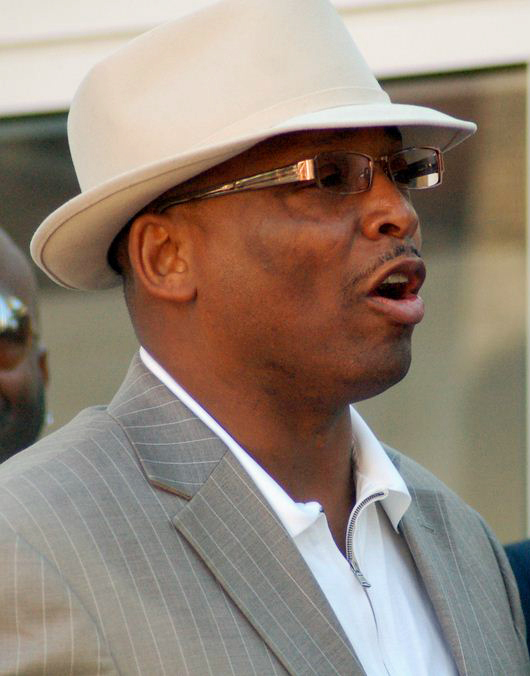
- Jimmy Jam (left) and Terry Lewis in January 2012

Background information
- Also known as: Jam & Lewis; Jimmy & Terry
- Born: James Samuel Harris III; June 6, 1959 (age 67); Minneapolis, Minnesota, U.S.; Terry Steven Lewis; November 24, 1956 (age 69); Omaha, Nebraska, U.S.
- Genres: Minneapolis sound; R&B; pop; new jack swing; hip-hop soul; gospel
- Occupations: Record producers; multi-instrumentalists; songwriters
- Instruments: Keyboards; piano; synthesizers; bass guitar
- Years active: 1981–present
- Labels: Tabu; Perspective; Flyte Tyme
- Spinoff of: The Time

James Samuel "Jimmy Jam" Harris III (born June 6, 1959) and Terry Steven Lewis (born November 24, 1956) are an American R&B/pop songwriting and record production team. Their productions have received commercial success since the 1980s with various artists, most extensively Janet Jackson. They have written 31 top ten hits in the UK and 41 in the US. In 2022, the duo were inducted into the Rock and Roll Hall of Fame in the Musical Excellence category. They have produced 16 number-one hits on the Billboard Hot 100, more than any other songwriting and production team.

== History ==
Jimmy Jam is the son of Cornbread Harris, a Minneapolis blues and jazz musician. Jimmy Jam met Lewis while attending an Upward Bound program on the University of Minnesota campus.

In the mid-1970s, Harris formed or joined Mind & Matter, an 11 piece band.

Lewis had been in the band Flyte Tyme, which Harris joined late in its history and which Prince restructured as the Time in 1981. As members of the Time, they played instruments on all but one of the group's five albums (Ice Cream Castle being the one exception), including Condensate which the group recorded as the Original 7ven.

In 1982, Jam and Lewis were introduced to music executive Dina R. Andrews, who was then an employee of Dick Griffey's SOLAR Records, where they would be mentored by record producer Leon Sylvers III. The pair asked Andrews to manage them, and through her relationships, Andrews first introduced the duo to Clarence Avant. They produced their first work for Avant for the S.O.S. Band. Andrews set up Jam and Lewis's company Flyte Tyme Productions and shopped them to her music industry colleagues. Jam and Lewis went on to produce several other acts for Avant under Dina Andrews Management for the S.O.S. Band, Cherrelle, Alexander O'Neal and Change. Additionally, Andrews shopped the duo to many of the executives and artists who used her services, such as Klymaxx, Cheryl Lynn ("Encore"), and executives such as A&M's John McClain (Janet Jackson).

The pair were fired by Prince after a freak Atlanta blizzard left them unable to make a tour date during which they were, unbeknown to Prince, producing music for the S.O.S. Band. However, one of the Atlanta tracks, "Just Be Good to Me", became a hit and established the duo's reputation. Jam and Lewis would rejoin the Time for two albums: 1990's Pandemonium and the 2011 album Condensate when the band went by the Original 7ven.

The duo was noted for early use of the Roland TR-808 drum machine, which was used in most of its productions. After working with other artists such as Thelma Houston, Cherrelle and Alexander O'Neal, Jam and Lewis were introduced to Janet Jackson and produced her breakthrough album Control in 1986, for which the duo won a Grammy Award. Their collaboration on her next album, 1989's Rhythm Nation 1814, proved even more successful as the album became one of the top-selling albums in history with four Billboard Hot 100 No. 1 hits. Their collaboration continued and remained highly successful, especially on the Billboard 200 No.1 albums janet., The Velvet Rope, All for You and Unbreakable.

In 1991, they founded a record label, Perspective Records, an A&M Records distributed label that has since been closed and then reactivated. Later that year, their newly minted label experienced success with the Minneapolis-based gospel/R&B group Sounds of Blackness. Their debut single, "Optimistic", served as a groundbreaking anthem stressing positivity and encouragement. The song served as a summer and fall anthem and began propelling Jam and Lewis' label. Other successes followed with Sounds of Blackness as well as releases from labelmates Mint Condition, Lo-Key? and Solo. In 1992, Perspective released the soundtrack for the film Mo' Money, which starred Damon Wayans, Stacey Dash and Marlon Wayans. Executive produced by Jam and Lewis, the soundtrack featured songs by Mint Condition, Ralph Tresvant and Caron Wheeler, as well as a duet by Janet Jackson and Luther Vandross.

In 2003, Jam and Lewis moved their recording operations to Santa Monica, California naming it Flyte Tyme West, due to more opportunities for work and collaboration. In 2006, they won a Grammy for Yolanda Adams' song "Be Blessed", from her 2005 album Day By Day. In 2007, Jam and Lewis produced the two-time Grammy Award-winning CD Funk This for Chaka Khan, which included the Award-winning R&B duet "Disrespectful", with Mary J. Blige.

The production duo reunited with the Time at the 50th Grammy Awards on February 10, 2008, in a medley that included the artist Rihanna, and featuring "Jungle Love". In June and July 2008, all of the original members of the Time (Morris Day, Jimmy Jam, Terry Lewis, Jesse Johnson, Jerome Benton, Jellybean Johnson, and Monte Moir) reunited once again for a series of shows at the Flamingo Hotel and Casino in Las Vegas.

In a career that has spanned more than four decades, Jam and Lewis have worked with a multitude of artists, including Lionel Richie, Herb Alpert, TLC, Sounds of Blackness, Yolanda Adams, Jordan Knight, Michael Jackson, Aretha Franklin, Boyz II Men, Usher, Johnny Gill, Patti LaBelle, Mary J. Blige, Chaka Khan, Mariah Carey, Prince, Mýa, Bryan Adams, Snoop Dogg, Spice Girls, Vanessa Williams, George Michael, Melanie B, Rod Stewart, Kelly Price, Gwen Stefani, New Edition, Eric Benét, Pia Zadora, SOLO, and the Human League.

== Approach and influences ==
Jimmy Jam credits his experience as a club DJ with developing his songwriting instincts, learning what moves a crowd, what brings people to the dance floor, and what clears it. Jam says he often begins songwriting with a beat rather than lyrics or melody, an approach he used in their work with Janet Jackson. Jam says he and Lewis approached each artist as fans, asking what song they would most want to hear before proposing ideas.

Jam also credits the music scene in Minneapolis with shaping the duo's sound and contributing to their success. He recalls advice from music executive Clarence Avant about avoiding the distractions of Hollywood: "When you’re driving don’t look at the Hollywood sign because you’re gonna crash."

Their production on Janet Jackson's Control (1986) helped pave the way for new jack swing.

== Personal lives ==
Terry Lewis has two children from previous relationships; son Trey and daughter, Chloe. Lewis was married to R&B singer Karyn White; the couple had two children: son Brandon and daughter Ashley. He later married Indira Singh and they have two children together.

Jimmy Jam is married to Mexican-U.S. businesswoman Lisa Padilla Harris; they have three children: Tyler, Max, and Bella. Jimmy served as chairman of the board of the National Academy of Recording Arts and Sciences. He is currently listed as chairman emeritus.

== Discography ==
=== Studio albums ===
Title	Studio album details	Peak chart positions	
Title	Studio album details	US Sales	UK Dig.
Jam & Lewis: Volume One	Released: July 9, 2021; Label: Flyte Tyme, BMG; Formats: CD, digital download	17	17

=== Singles ===
Title	Year	Peak chart positions			Album
Title	Year	US R&B	US Adult R&B	US Gospel Airplay	Album
"Til I Found You" (featuring Sounds of Blackness)	2019	—	22	21	Jam & Lewis: Volume One
"He Don't Know Nothin' Bout It" (featuring Babyface)	2020	16	4	—	Jam & Lewis: Volume One
"Somewhat Loved" (featuring Mariah Carey)	2021	—	12	—	Jam & Lewis: Volume One
"—" denotes releases that did not chart or were not released in that territory.

== Charts ==
They have produced 16 Billboard Hot 100 No. 1 hits, and 26 Billboard R&B No. 1 hits.

They are among a handful of producers to have No. 1 records in three consecutive decades, with number ones in the 1980s, 1990s, and 2000s.

They have had 41 songs reach the Top 10 of the Billboard Hot 100, and 31 in the top 10 in the UK.

=== Billboard Hot 100 No. 1s ===
- Janet Jackson:
  - "When I Think of You"
  - "Miss You Much"
  - "Escapade"
  - "Love Will Never Do (Without You)"
  - "That's the Way Love Goes"
  - "Again"
  - "Together Again"
  - "Doesn't Really Matter"
  - "All for You"
- The Human League - "Human"
- George Michael - "Monkey"
- Karyn White - "Romantic"
- Boyz II Men:
  - "On Bended Knee"
  - "4 Seasons of Loneliness"
- Mariah Carey - "Thank God I Found You" (featuring Joe & 98 Degrees)
- Usher - "U Remind Me"

== Awards ==
Since forming their music company Flyte Tyme in 1982, Jam & Lewis have earned more than 100 gold, platinum, multi-platinum and diamond albums for their work with such artists as Janet Jackson, Michael Jackson, Boyz II Men, Usher, Mary J. Blige, Mariah Carey, Luther Vandross, Yolanda Adams, Herb Alpert, New Edition, Human League, George Michael, Earth, Wind and Fire, TLC, Robert Palmer, Gwen Stefani and Kanye West. They have more than 100 ASCAP songwriting and publishing awards, including several Songwriter of the Year awards.

In 1993, Jam & Lewis were nominated with Janet Jackson for an Academy Award for Best Original Song for "Again", from the movie Poetic Justice.

In 2020 Jam & Lewis were nominated with Sheila E. for an Primetime Emmy Award for Outstanding Music Direction for the TV special Let's Go Crazy: The Grammy Salute to Prince.

=== Grammy Awards ===
Jam & Lewis have won five Grammy Awards. They have received more nominations for Producer of the Year, Non-Classical than any other producer, with 11 nominations. They won the award in 1987 at the 29th Grammy Awards, in the first year they were nominated.

Year	Nominee / work	Award	Result
1987	Control	Album of the Year	Nominated
1987	"What Have You Done For Me Lately"	Best R&B Song	Nominated
1987	Jimmy Jam & Terry Lewis	Producer of the Year, Non-Classical	Won
1990	Janet Jackson's Rhythm Nation 1814	Best Instrumental Arrangement Accompanying Vocals	Nominated
1990	"Miss You Much"	Best R&B Song	Nominated
1990	Jimmy Jam & Terry Lewis and Janet Jackson	Producer of the Year, Non-Classical	Nominated
1991	"Alright"	Best R&B Song	Nominated
1994	"That's the Way Love Goes"	Best R&B Song	Won
1994	Jimmy Jam & Terry Lewis	Producer of the Year, Non-Classical	Nominated
1995	Jimmy Jam & Terry Lewis	Producer of the Year, Non-Classical	Nominated
1996	HIStory: Past, Present and Future, Book I	Album of the Year	Nominated
1996	Jimmy Jam & Terry Lewis	Producer of the Year, Non-Classical	Nominated
2001	Jimmy Jam & Terry Lewis	Producer of the Year, Non-Classical	Nominated
2002	All For You	Best Pop Vocal Album	Nominated
2002	"All For You"	Best Dance Recording	Won
2002	Jimmy Jam & Terry Lewis	Producer of the Year, Non-Classical	Nominated
2003	Jimmy Jam & Terry Lewis	Producer of the Year, Non-Classical	Nominated
2004	Jimmy Jam & Terry Lewis	Producer of the Year, Non-Classical	Nominated
2005	Confessions	Album of the Year	Nominated
2005	Damita Jo	Best Contemporary R&B Album	Nominated
2005	Jimmy Jam & Terry Lewis	Producer of the Year, Non-Classical	Nominated
2006	Love. Angel. Music. Baby.	Album of the Year	Nominated
2006	"Be Blessed"	Best Gospel Song	Won
2006	Jimmy Jam & Terry Lewis	Producer of the Year, Non-Classical	Nominated
2007	20 Y.O.	Best Contemporary R&B Album	Nominated
2008	Funk This	Best R&B Album	Won
2016	Forever Charlie	Best R&B Album	Nominated
