= Karyn White discography =

This article contains the discography of American R&B singer Karyn White. This includes studio albums, compilation albums, and singles.

== Albums ==
=== Studio albums ===
Year	Album details	Peak chart positions							Certifications
Year	Album details	US	US R&B	AUS	CAN	JPN	NLD	UK	Certifications
1988	Karyn White: Release Date: September 6, 1988; Label: Warner Bros.	19	1	130	20	—	—	20	RIAA: Platinum; BPI: Gold
1991	Ritual of Love: Release Date: September 10, 1991; Label: Warner Bros.	53	7	152	—	18	62	31	RIAA: Gold
1994	Make Him Do Right: Release Date: September 27, 1994; Label: Warner Bros.	99	22	—	—	17	—	—	
2012	Carpe Diem: Release Date: March 24, 2012; Label: KW Enterprises / Lightyear	—	—	—	—	—	—	—	
2017	Gale & The Storm (Music From And Inspired By The Original Motion Picture): Release Date: September 4, 2017; Label: KW Enterprises / Karyn White Enterprises, Inc.	—	—	—	—	—	—	—	
"—" denotes a recording that did not chart or was not released in that territory.

=== Compilation albums ===
Year	Album details	Peak positions
Year	Album details	JPN
1995	Sweet & Sensual: Release Date: April 10, 1995; Label: WEA Japan	29
2007	Superwoman: The Best of Karyn White: Release Date: April 3, 2007; Label: Shout! Factory	—
"—" denotes a recording that did not chart or was not released in that territory.

== Singles ==
=== As lead artist ===
Year	Title	Peak chart positions										Certifications	Album
Year	Title	US	US R&B	US Dan	US AC	AUS	CAN	IRE	NLD	NZ	UK	Certifications	Album
1988	"The Way You Love Me"	7	1	5	38	—	—	—	22	48	42	RIAA: Gold	Karyn White
1988	"Superwoman"	8	1	—	12	162	16	20	—	—	11	RIAA: Gold	Karyn White
1989	"Love Saw It" (with Babyface)	—	1	—	—	—	—	—	—	—	—		Karyn White
1989	"Secret Rendezvous"	6	4	1	—	—	14	—	83	—	52		Karyn White
1989	"Slow Down"	—	36	—	—	—	—	—	—	—	—		Karyn White
1989	"Secret Rendezvous" (re-release UK Only)	—	—	—	—	—	—	—	—	—	22		Karyn White
1989	"The Way You Love Me" (Remix UK Only)	—	—	—	—	—	—	—	—	—	82		Karyn White
1991	"Romantic"	1	1	6	37	68	16	29	22	—	23		Ritual of Love
1991	"The Way I Feel About You"	12	5	—	35	150	13	—	—	47	65		Ritual of Love
1992	"Walkin' the Dog"	—	34	—	—	—	—	—	—	—	—		Ritual of Love
1992	"Do Unto Me"	—	24	—	—	—	—	—	—	—	—		Ritual of Love
1994	"Hungah"	78	18	10	—	169	—	—	—	—	69		Make Him Do Right
1994	"Can I Stay with You"	81	10	—	—	—	—	—	—	34	—		Make Him Do Right
1995	"I'd Rather Be Alone"	120	50	—	—	—	—	—	—	—	—		Make Him Do Right
2012	"Sista, Sista"	—	—	—	—	—	—	—	—	—	—		Carpe Diem
2012	"Unbreakable"	—	—	—	—	—	—	—	—	—	—		Carpe Diem
2017	"Love Quarantine"	—	—	—	—	—	—	—	—	—	—	—	Gale & The Storm (Music From And Inspired By The Original Motion Picture)
2026	"You're Gonna Want Me Back"	—	14	—	—	—	—	—	—	—	—	—	Non-album single
"—" denotes a recording that did not chart or was not released in that territory.

=== As featured artist ===
Year	Title	Artist	Peak chart positions				Album
Year	Title	Artist	US	US R&B	US Dan	UK	Album
1986	"Facts of Love"	Jeff Lorber	27	17	9	95	Private Passion
1986	"Back in Love"	Jeff Lorber w/ Michael Jeffries	—	—	—	—	Private Passion
1987	"True Confessions"	Jeff Lorber	—	88	—	—	Private Passion
1987	"We Never Called It Love"	Pauli Carman	—	—	—	—	It's TIme
1989	"Not Thru Being with You"	Michael Jeffries	—	32	—	99	Michael Jeffries
"—" denotes a recording that did not chart or was not released in that territory.

=== Music videos ===
Song	Year	Director
"The Way You Love Me"	1988	N/A
"Superwoman"	1989	N/A
"Secret Rendezous"	1989	Paul Hunter
"Romantic"	1991	Matthew Rolston
“The Way I Feel About You”	1991	N/A
"Walkin' The Dog"	1992	Julien Temple
"Sista Sista"	2012	Gregory Everett
"Unbreakable"	2012	Markeda Shorter
