= Who'll Be the Fool Tonight =

1980 single by Larsen Feiten

Single by Larsen Feiten

from the album Larsen Feiten
- B-side: "Further Notice"
- Released: 1980
- Genre: Jazz fusion
- Length: 3:52 (single version); 4:10 (album version)
- Label: Warner Bros.
- Songwriter: Buzz Feiten
- Producer: Tommy LiPuma

Larsen Feiten singles chronology
"Who'll Be the Fool Tonight" (1980)	"She's Not In Love" (1980)

"Who'll Be the Fool Tonight" is a song by Neil Larsen and Buzz Feiten. It was released as a single in 1980 from their self-titled album.

The song peaked at No. 29 on the Billboard Hot 100, becoming the duo's only top 40 hit.

== Chart performance ==
Chart (1980)	Peak position
Australia (Kent Music Report)	91
US Billboard Hot 100	29
US Billboard Adult Contemporary	22

== See also ==
- List of one-hit wonders in the United States
