= Private Passion =

Studio album by Jeff Lorber featuring Karyn White and Michael Jeffries
- Released: October 1986
- Recorded: 1986
- Studio: JHL Studios (Pacific Palisades, CA); Larrabee Sound Studios (North Hollywood, CA); Encore Studios and Ground Control Studios (Burbank, CA); Buckman Studio (Sherman Oaks, CA); The Village Recorder and Studio 55 (Los Angeles, CA)
- Genre: Smooth jazz; soul; R&B; jazz-funk
- Length: 54:50
- Label: Warner Bros. Records
- Producer: Carl Sturken; Evan Rogers; Jeff Lorber; Taavi Mote; Robbie Buchanan

Jeff Lorber chronology
Step by Step (1985)	Private Passion (1986)	Worth Waiting For (1993)

Singles from Private Passion
- 1. "True Confessions" Released: 1986; 2. "Facts of Love" Released: 1986; 3. "Back In Love" Released: 1987

Professional ratings
Review scores
Source	Rating
AllMusic	2/5 stars

Private Passion is the fourth album by Jeff Lorber, released in 1986 on Warner Bros. Records. It features Karyn White and Tower of Power member Michael Jeffries on vocals.

The album peaked at No. 68 on the Billboard 200, becoming Lorber's most successful album. "Facts of Love" peaked at No. 27 on the Billboard Hot 100, becoming the album's (and Lorber's) only Top 40 hit.

== Aftermath ==
Despite the success of Private Passion, Jeff Lorber was not satisfied with the output of his solo albums, stating that they have a more vocal and R&B approach with himself as a sideman. As a result, he took a hiatus in music before returning in 1993 with Worth Waiting For. Meanwhile, the album launched Karyn White's solo career as she released her 1988 debut self-titled album, which contained 3 Top 10 singles.

== Track listing ==
Side A
No.	Title	Writer(s)	Lead vocals	Length
1.	"Facts of Love"	Sturken, Rogers	White	4:32
2.	"True Confessions"	Sturken, Rogers	White	4:16
3.	"Jamaica"	Lorber		4:09
4.	"Back In Love"	B. Hull, J. Hull	White, Jeffries	4:10
5.	"Kristen"	Lorber		5:18

Side B
No.	Title	Writer(s)	Lead vocals	Length
6.	"Private Passion"	Sturken, Rogers	Jeffries	4:18
7.	"Sand Castles"	Lorber		5:34
8.	"Keep On Loving Her"	Walsh, Lorber	Jeffries	5:02
9.	"Midnight Snack"	Lorber		5:21

== Personnel ==
- Jeff Lorber – synthesizers (1, 2, 9), programming (1, 2), synthesizer programming (3–9), guitars (3)
- Carl Sturken – synthesizers (1, 2), programming (1, 2), synthesizer programming (6), guitars (6)
- Robbie Buchanan – synthesizer programming (4)
- Larry Carlton – guitars (3)
- Dann Huff – guitars (4)
- Buzz Feiten – guitars (5, 7–9)
- Brock Walsh – drum programming (9)
- Freddie Hubbard – flugelhorn (5)
- George Howard – soprano saxophone (7)
- Karyn White – lead vocals (1, 2, 4), backing vocals (1, 2)
- Michael Jeffries – lead vocals (4, 6, 8), backing vocals (6)
- Evan Rogers – backing vocals (1, 2, 4, 6, 8)
- Bunny Hull – backing vocals (4, 8)

== Production ==
- Jeff Lorber – producer (1–3, 5–9)
- Evan Rogers – producer (1, 2, 6)
- Carl Sturken – producer (1, 2, 6)
- Taavi Mote – associate producer (1, 2, 6), producer (3, 5, 7)
- Robbie Buchanan – producer (4)
- Brock Walsh – producer (8)
- Laura LiPuma – art direction, design
- Nels Israelson – photography
- Steve Drimmer – manager
- Allen Kovac – manager
- Left Bank Management – management company

Technical credits

- Bernie Grundman – mastering at Bernie Grundman Mastering (Hollywood, California)
- Jeff Lorber – recording (1, 2, 6, 8, 9)
- Taavi Mote – mixing (1–3, 5–9), recording (3, 7–9)
- Paul Retaczak – overdub tracking (1, 2, 6), recording (8)
- Craig Burbage – guitar recording (3)
- Paul Ericksen – engineer (4)
- Frank Wolf – engineer (4)
- John "Tokes" Potoker – mixing (4)
- Sabrina Buchanek – assistant engineer (9)
- Darwin Foye – assistant engineer (9)
- John Hegedes – assistant engineer (9)
- Jimmy Hogson – assistant engineer (9)
- Glen Holguin – assistant engineer (9)
- Jeff Lorenzen – assistant engineer (9)

== Charts ==
Album

Year	Chart	Position
1987	Billboard 200	68
1987	Billboard Top Black Albums	29
1987	Billboard Jazz Albums	17

Singles

Year	Single	Chart	Position
1986	"Facts of Love"	Billboard Black Singles	17
1986	"Facts of Love"	Billboard Dance Club Songs	9
1987	"Facts of Love"	Billboard Hot 100	27
1987	"True Confessions"	Billboard Black Singles	88
