= Ashbrook =

Ashbrook is a surname, and may refer to:

- Dana Ashbrook (born 1967), American actor
- Daphne Ashbrook (born 1963), American actress
- Frank G. Ashbrook (1892–1966), American mammalogist
- Jean Spencer Ashbrook (born 1934), American politician, spouse of John
- John M. Ashbrook (1928–1982), American politician, spouse of Jean
- Joseph Ashbrook (1918–1980), American astronomer
- Larry Gene Ashbrook (1952–1999), American mass murderer
- Sharon Ashbrook, British chemist
- Stanley Bryan Ashbrook (1882–1958), American philatelist
- Stephen Ashbrook (born 1969), American singer-songwriter
- Tom Ashbrook (born 1956), American journalist
- Temple Ashbrook (1896–1976), American sailor
- William A. Ashbrook (1867–1940), American businessman and politician
- William Ashbrook (1922–2009), American musicologist, writer, journalist, and academic
- William Ashbrook Kellerman (1850–1908), American botanist, mycologist, and photographer

== See also ==
- Viscount Ashbrook, a title in the Peerage of Ireland.
- Ashbrook (crater)
- Ellis Ashbrook, American rock group
