= Worth Waiting For =

Jeff Lorber jazz album

Studio album by Jeff Lorber
- Released: January 1, 1993
- Studio: JHL Sound (Pacific Palisades, California); Bill Schnee Studios (North Hollywood, California)
- Genre: Smooth jazz, jazz fusion
- Length: 57:20
- Label: Verve Forecast
- Producer: Jeff Lorber

Jeff Lorber chronology
Private Passion (1986)	Worth Waiting For (1993)	West Side Stories (1994)

Professional ratings
Review scores
Source	Rating
Allmusic	4/5 stars

Worth Waiting For is the tenth studio album by jazz keyboardist Jeff Lorber, released on Verve Forecast in January 1993. The album topped the U.S. Billboard Contemporary Jazz Albums chart at the end of July 1993. Worth Waiting For is the only album by Lorber to hit number 1 on that chart; five others rose to number 2. The album also hit number 33 on Billboard's Jazz chart, and number 71 on the R&B chart.

The album marked a return by Lorber to his solo work, after a break of eight years in which he produced music for other artists. In the interim, Lorber produced a number of dance remixes, including ones for U2 and Paula Abdul. In 1990 he put together saxophonist Dave Koz's self-titled solo album, and in 1991 he produced saxophonist Eric Marienthal's successful Oasis smooth jazz album. But Lorber was growing dissatisfied with compromising in favor of the artist; he said "My attitude became less positive". Years later, he said he came back to solo jazz albums because he "wanted to be more in creative control and express myself."

Worth Waiting For continued the 1980s series of Lorber's smooth jazz/jazz fusion albums featuring prominent synthesizer sounds, mixing jazz with elements of contemporary R&B, funk and pop. The album sold very well compared to straight jazz recordings, as the American public in the 1990s was demanding contemporary jazz. Worth Waiting For stayed on Billboard's Contemporary Jazz chart for 30 weeks in 1993, selling more than 100,000 units. Similarly, Art Porter Jr.'s album Straight to the Point was also released later in 1993 in the jazz fusion style, produced by Lorber at Lorber's own JHL recording studio. Porter characterized both albums as having uncomplicated melodies supported by danceable beats. He said, "This music is entertaining and it has energy. It definitely has a groove, and we play it with integrity." In the 2010s Lorber would shift away from synthesizers to emphasize more acoustic jazz sounds.

== Track listing ==
No.	Title	Writer(s)	Featured artist(s)	Length
1.	"Rain Song"	Jeff Lorber	Art Porter Jr., sax	5:21
2.	"The Underground"	Lorber		4:44
3.	"Yellowstone"	Lorber, Jeff Pfeifer	Bruce Hornsby on second keyboard solo	4:29
4.	"Punta Del Este"	Lorber, Alec Milstein	vocals by Alec Milstein and Janis Siegel	5:03
5.	"Lost with You"	Lorber, Carl Fysh	Eric Jordan, vocals	5:18
6.	"Worth Waiting For"	Lorber, Dave Koz	Dave Koz, sax	5:28
7.	"High Wire"	Lorber, Koz	Dave Koz, sax	5:56
8.	"Wavelength"	Lorber, Gary Meek	Buzz Feiten, guitar	6:00
9.	"Columbus Ave."	Lorber, Brian Bromberg	Art Porter Jr., sax	5:22
10.	"Do What It Takes"	Lorber, Curt Bisquera	Lee Ritenour, acoustic guitar solo	5:17
11.	"Jazzery"	Lorber, Steve Harvey		4:22

== Personnel ==
- Jeff Lorber – keyboards, synth percussion, arrangements, rhythm arrangements (4, 11), vocal arrangements (5)
- Bruce Hornsby – additional acoustic piano and second solo (3)
- Paul Jackson, Jr. – guitars (1–4, 6–10)
- Oliver Leiber – guitars (7)
- Buzz Feiten – guitars (8)
- Lee Ritenour – nylon guitar solo (10)
- Alec Milstein – electric bass (1–3, 6–11), keyboards (4), vocals (4), rhythm arrangements (4)
- John Robinson – drums (1, 3, 6, 7, 9, 11)
- Curt Bisquera – drum programming (10), hi-hat (10)
- Paulinho da Costa – percussion (1–6, 8–10)
- Art Porter Jr. – alto saxophone (1), soprano saxophone (9)
- Gary Meek – soprano saxophone (2, 4, 8, 11), flute (3), tenor saxophone (3)
- Dave Koz – soprano saxophone (6), alto saxophone (7)
- Leroy Osbourne – vocal arrangements (5)
- Steve Harvey – rhythm arrangements (11)
- Janis Siegel – vocals (4)
- Eric Jordan – lead and backing vocals (5)

== Production ==
- Guy Eckstine – executive producer
- Jeff Lorber – producer, engineer
- Alan Meyerson – mixing, additional engineer
- Allan Sides – live drums recording
- Greg Hull – second engineer
- Nikki Trafalian – second engineer
- Gerard Zaffa – second engineer
- John Zaika – second engineer
- Nate Herr – product manager
- Sheryl Lutz-Brown – art direction
- Ben Argueta – design
- Caroline Greyshock – photography
- Shelly Haber – direction
- Leanne Meyers – direction
- Vision Management – management

== Charts ==
Chart (1993)	Peak position
U.S. Billboard Top Contemporary Jazz Albums	1
U.S. Billboard Top Jazz Albums	33
U.S. Billboard Top R&B Albums	71
