= Pocket City =

Studio album by Art Porter Jr.
- Released: May 1992
- Recorded: 1992
- Studios: JHL, Los Angeles, California
- Genre: Smooth jazz/fusion
- Label: Verve Forecast/PolyGram
- Producer: Jeff Lorber

Art Porter Jr. chronology
Pocket City (1992)	Straight to the Point (1993)

Pocket City is the debut album by the American musician Art Porter Jr., released in 1992. Porter Jr. supported the album by touring with Lisa Stansfield. Pocket City made Billboard's Contemporary Jazz Albums chart.

== Production ==
The album was produced by Jeff Lorber. Porter Jr. composed eight of its songs. A video was shot for the title track.

== Critical reception ==
Professional ratings
Review scores
Source	Rating
AllMusic	3/5 stars
DownBeat	3/5 stars

The Chicago Tribune deemed the album "a suave, cool delight from finish to end, full of breezy and uptempo tunes as well as dreamy, romantic-type ballads." The Washington Post wrote: "After a couple half-hearted attempts at ballads, Porter comes up with the likable 'Passion Sunrise', but Porter and his backing band never really let loose, save on an upbeat cover of Maxi Priest's 1990 hit, 'Close to You'."

== Track list ==
1. Pocket City
2. Inside Myself
3. Unending
4. Passion Sunrise
5. Texas Hump
6. Close to You
7. Little People
8. KGB
9. Broken Promise
10. Meltdown
11. L.A.

== Personnel ==
- Art Porter: alto and soprano saxophones
- Buzz Feiten: guitar
- Paul Pesco: guitar
- Oliver Leiber: guitar
- Mark "Breeze" Shapiro: guitar
- Alec Milstein: bass guitar
- Paulinho Da Costa: percussion
- Guy Eckstine: percussion
- Brigitte McWilliams: backing vocals
- Valerie Davis: backing vocals
