= Facts of Love =

1986 single by Jeff Lorber featuring Karyn White

Single by Jeff Lorber featuring Karyn White

from the album Private Passion
- B-side: "Sand Castles"
- Released: 1986
- Recorded: 1986, Los Angeles
- Genre: Dance-pop
- Length: 4:32 (album and 12-inch version); 4:00 (single version)
- Label: Warner Bros.
- Songwriter: Carl Sturken and Evan Rogers
- Producers: Carl Sturken; Evan Rogers; Jeff Lorber

Jeff Lorber singles chronology
"True Confessions" (1986)	"Facts of Love" (1986)	"Back In Love" (1987)

Alternate cover
- Cover for UK release

"Facts of Love" is a song by Jeff Lorber with Karyn White on lead vocals. It was released as a single in 1986 from their album Private Passion. The song peaked at number 27 on the US Billboard Hot 100, becoming Lorber's only Top 40 hit.

== Chart performance ==
Chart (1986–1987)	Peak position
US Billboard Hot 100	27
US Billboard Black Singles	17
US Billboard Dance Club Songs	9
UK Singles	95

== See also ==
- List of one-hit wonders in the United States
