= Larsen-Feiten Band =

Studio album by Larsen-Feiten Band
- Released: 1980
- Recorded: 1980
- Studio: Capitol Studios; Mama Jo's; Crimson Sound
- Label: Warner Bros.
- Producer: Tommy LiPuma

Larsen-Feiten Band chronology
Larsen-Feiten Band (1980)	Full Moon (1982)

Singles from Larsen-Feiten Band
- 1. "Who'll Be the Fool Tonight" Released: 1980; 2. "She's Not in Love" Released: 1980; 3. "Danger Zone" Released: 1980

Larsen-Feiten Band is the self-titled album by Neil Larsen and Buzz Feiten, released in 1980 on Warner Bros. Records.

"Who'll Be the Fool Tonight" peaked at No. 29 on the Billboard Hot 100, becoming the duo's only top 40 hit.

== Track listing ==
Side A
No.	Title	Writer(s)	Length
1.	"Who'll Be the Fool Tonight"	Feiten	4:10
2.	"Danger Zone"	Feiten, Smith	5:03
3.	"Further Notice"	Larsen	3:34
4.	"Over"	Larsen, Allee Willis	5:09

Side B
No.	Title	Writer(s)	Length
5.	"She's Not in Love"	Feiten, Michael Sembello	4:40
6.	"Morning Star"	Feiten	5:20
7.	"Make It"	Larsen, Allee Willis	4:27
8.	"Aztec Legend"	Larsen	4:46

== Personnel ==
- Neil Larsen - lead and backing vocals, keyboards
- Buzz Feiten - lead and backing vocals, guitar
- Kim Hutchcroft - horns
- Lenny Castro - backing vocals, percussion
- Willie Weeks - bass
- Art Rodriguez - drums
- Larry Williams - horns
- Bill Reichenbach - horns
- Chuck Findley - horns

Production

- Producer: Tommy LiPuma
- Mixing: Al Schmitt
- Engineers: Bill Taylor, Don Henderson, Terry Becker
- Photography: Norman Seeff & Darius Anthony

== Charts ==
Singles

Year	Single	Chart	Position
1980	"Who'll Be the Fool Tonight"	Billboard Hot 100	29
1980	"Who'll Be the Fool Tonight"	Billboard Adult Contemporary	22
