= Playboy's 40th Anniversary: Four Decades of Jazz 1953–1993 =

Box set by various artists
- Released: October 1993
- Recorded: 1953–1993
- Genre: Jazz
- Length: 4:53:06
- Labels: PolyGram; Verve; Playboy
- Producers: Howard Smiley; Guy Eckstine

Professional ratings
Review scores
Source	Rating
AllMusic	3/5 stars
Buffalo News	4/5 stars

Playboy's 40th Anniversary: Four Decades of Jazz 1953–1993 is a 1993 box set, which was released to commemorate the 40th anniversary of Playboy magazine and its long association with jazz music.

The four-disc set contains 51 songs total, selected by Playboy founder Hugh M. Hefner himself and a 48-page booklet written by jazz musician and historian Leonard Feather and music critic and journalist Neil Tesser.

== Tracklist ==
=== Disc one (1953–1963) ===
1. "Now's the Time" by Charlie Parker – 3:01
2. "Every Day I Have the Blues" by Count Basie and Joe Williams – 5:24
3. "Lullaby of Birdland" by Sarah Vaughan and Clifford Brown – 3:58
4. "A Night in Tunisia" by Dizzy Gillespie – 4:14
5. "Lady Sings the Blues" by Billie Holiday – 3:44
6. "Misty" by Erroll Garner – 2:45
7. "Take the "A" Train" by Ella Fitzgerald and Duke Ellington – 6:36
8. "What a Diff'rence a Day Made" by Dinah Washington – 2:28
9. "Django" by the Modern Jazz Quartet – 7:03
10. "I Apologize" by Billy Eckstine – 3:00
11. "Blue Monk" by Thelonious Monk – 7:34
12. "Too Close for Comfort" by Mel Tormé – 3:59
13. "Goodbye Pork Pie Hat" by Charles Mingus – 4:46
14. "Take Five" by the Dave Brubeck Quartet – 5:25
15. "'Round Midnight" by Miles Davis – 5:13
16. "Giant Steps" by John Coltrane – 4:43

=== Disc two (1963–1973) ===
1. "Night Train" by Oscar Peterson – 4:50
2. "I Loves You, Porgy" by Nina Simone – 2:31
3. "Maiden Voyage" by Herbie Hancock – 7:55
4. "Mercy, Mercy, Mercy" by Cannonball Adderley – 5:08
5. "The Girl from Ipanema" by Stan Getz and Astrud Gilberto – 5:21
6. "Song for My Father" by Horace Silver – 7:16
7. "Sidewinder" by Lee Morgan – 10:20
8. "A Day in the Life" by Wes Montgomery – 5:30
9. "Walk on the Wild Side" by Jimmy Smith – 5:50
10. "Compared to What" by Les McCann and Eddie Harris – 8:41
11. "Soul Sauce" by Cal Tjader – 2:22
12. "Memphis Underground" by Herbie Mann – 7:07
13. "Captain Marvel" by Return to Forever – 4:53

=== Disc three (1973–1983) ===
1. "Also Sprach Zarathustra (2001)" by Eumir Deodato – 8:58
2. "Pieces of Dreams" by Stanley Turrentine – 4:32
3. "Crystal Silence" by Gary Burton and Chick Corea – 9:01
4. "Birds of Fire" by the Mahavishnu Orchestra – 5:41
5. "My Song" by Keith Jarrett – 6:09
6. "Body Heat" by Quincy Jones – 4:18
7. "Black Byrd" by Donald Byrd – 8:00
8. "Feels So Good" by Chuck Mangione – 9:41
9. "Everybody Loves the Sunshine" by Roy Ayers – 4:01
10. "Mister Magic" by Grover Washington Jr. – 9:11

=== Disc four (1983–1993) ===
1. "Phase Dance" by Pat Metheny – 8:17
2. "For the Love of You" by Earl Klugh – 5:59
3. "Here's to Life" by Shirley Horn – 5:36
4. "Lush Life" by Joe Henderson – 4:57
5. "Restoration" by Bob James – 5:44
6. "Look What I Got!" by Betty Carter – 5:41
7. "The Lady in My Life" by Stanley Jordan – 6:26
8. "Bird Alone" by Abbey Lincoln and Stan Getz – 8:33
9. "Songbird" by Kenny G – 5:00
10. "Max-O-Man" by Fourplay – 5:32
11. "Don't Worry, Be Happy" by Bobby McFerrin – 4:48
12. "Rockit" by Herbie Hancock – 5:24
