= Lay Your Hands on Me (album) =

Studio album by Art Porter
- Released: August 20, 1996
- Recorded: 1995–1996
- Genre: Jazz
- Label: Verve
- Producer: Chuckii Booker

Art Porter chronology
Undercover (1994)	Lay Your Hands on Me (1996)	For Art's Sake (1998)

Professional ratings
Review scores
Source	Rating
Allmusic	3/5 stars

Lay Your Hands on Me is the fourth and final studio album by Art Porter Jr. Lay Your Hands on Me was produced by Chuckii Booker, recorded at Siide FX Studios and mixed at AmerRaycan Studios by Raymundo Silva. The album has been described as a tribute to Chicago. AllMusic described it as "smoother than should be legal".

== Track listing ==
1. "Flight Time"
2. "Lake Shore Drive"
3. "One More Chance" (featuring Lalah Hathaway)
4. "Just Wanna Be With You"
5. "DB Blue"
6. "Candelights"
7. "Wishful Thinking"
8. "Forever Love" (featuring Brian McKnight)
9. "We Are One"
10. "Lay Your Hands On Me"
