= Peaceful World (album) =

Studio album by the Rascals
- Released: May 5, 1971
- Recorded: October 1970 to March 1971
- Genre: Soul; jazz; funk
- Length: 75:25
- Label: Columbia
- Producer: Felix Cavaliere

The Rascals chronology
Search and Nearness (1971)	Peaceful World (1971)	The Island of Real (1972)

Peaceful World is the eighth studio album (a double-LP) by the American rock band the Rascals, released on May 5, 1971. It peaked at number 122 on the Billboard 200 chart. In Canada, the album reached number 50. The single "Love Me" reached number 95 on the Billboard Hot 100.

== History ==
Vocalist Eddie Brigati left the Rascals in August 1970, with guitarist Gene Cornish leaving the following month. By October, a new lineup of the Rascals was assembled featuring original members Felix Cavaliere (vocals/keyboards) and Dino Danelli (drums), and several new players, including ex-Paul Butterfield Blues Band guitarist Buzz Feiten and vocalist Annie Sutton. Peaceful World was the first album featuring this new version of the band. It was also the Rascals' first album for the CBS/Columbia label, after almost six years with Atlantic Records.

Many of the songs on Peaceful World were jazz-influenced, as opposed to the "blue-eyed soul" style of the Rascals' heyday; the title track, in particular, was a long piece featuring improvisation and multiple extended solos.

Peaceful World was reissued along with The Island of Real on the BGO label in 2008.

== Reception ==
Professional ratings
Review scores
Source	Rating
Allmusic	4/5 stars
Christgau's Record Guide	C+
The Village Voice	B+

Writing for Allmusic, critic Jim Newsom praised the album and wrote Peaceful World was "a wonderful blend of soul, jazz, and funk that never found an audience.. Despite its lack of commercial success, this was an artistic triumph for Felix Cavaliere... his ambitious album took the Rascals to the place Cavaliere had been headed over the course of the last couple of albums—but, sadly, the fans didn't follow." Robert Christgau admired the change of direction the album took to jazz, but also wrote: "Yet in the end the jazz musicians he's signed on—Fathead Newman, Joe Farrell, Pepper Adams, Ron Carter—aren't especially well-suited to popularize Coltrane and Pharoah and Sun Ra. And even if Felix were singing enough, he wouldn't be singing very good stuff—composition has never been his strength..."

In his review for the reissue of Peaceful World/The Island of Real, critic Thom Jurek wrote of the album, "Peaceful World is a sprawling yet very focused collection of songs... The remarkable aspect of this gorgeous record is that it sounds vintage but not dated. The production is clean, the funk is in the cut, and the communication between musicians in the charts is tight."

== Track listing ==
All songs by Felix Cavaliere, except "In and Out of Love" and "Icy Water" by Buzzy Feiten

=== Side 1 ===
1. "Sky Trane" – 5:47
2. "In and Out of Love" – 3:13
3. "Bit of Heaven" – 3:30
4. "Love Me" – 3:48

=== Side 2 ===
1. "Mother Nature Land" – 3:31
2. "Icy Water" – 4:31
3. "Happy Song" – 3:42
4. "Love Letter" – 5:27

=== Side 3 ===
1. "Little Dove" – 6:30
2. "Visit to Mother Nature Land" – 5:04
3. "Getting Nearer" – 8:57

=== Side 4 ===
1. "Peaceful World" – 21:25

== Personnel ==
- Felix Cavaliere – vocals, keyboards, marimba, organ, piano
- Dino Danelli – drums
- Howard "Buzz" Feiten – guitar, bass guitar, background vocals
- Linc Chamberland – guitar, horn arrangements
- Ron Carter, Jerry Jemmott, Robert Popwell, Chuck Rainey, William Salter – bass guitar
- Ralph MacDonald – bells, conga, percussion, shaker, talking drum
- Alice Coltrane – harp
- Joe Newman, Ernie Royal – trumpet
- Jon Robert Smith (born 1946), Ernie Wilkins – saxophone
- Pepper Adams – baritone saxophone
- Garnett Brown – horn, trombone
- Joe Farrell – flute, soprano saxophone, tenor saxophone
- Hubert Laws – flute
- Annie Sutton – background vocals
- Molly Holt – background vocals
- Buddy Buono – background vocals
- Cynthia Webb – background vocals
- James Green, Jerry Lee Smith – recording engineer
- Bob Irwin – mastering engineer
