= Romantic (song) =

Single by Karyn White

from the album Ritual of Love
- Released: August 23, 1991
- Genre: Dance-pop; new jack swing
- Length: 4:07
- Label: Warner Bros.
- Songwriters: Jimmy Jam and Terry Lewis; Karyn White
- Producers: Jimmy Jam and Terry Lewis

Karyn White singles chronology
"The Way You Love Me" (1989)	"Romantic" (1991)	"The Way I Feel About You" (1991)

"Romantic" is a song by American singer Karyn White, released in August 1991 by Warner Bros. as the first single from her second studio album, Ritual of Love (1991). White co-wrote the song with Jimmy Jam and her future husband Terry Lewis, with the latter two also producing the track. It hit number one on the US Billboard Hot 100 on November 2, 1991 as well as on the US Cash Box Top 100, making it her biggest hit to date. "Romantic" was also White's fourth number one on the Billboard Hot R&B Singles chart.

According to Billboard, the song is about sex, and was ranked number 28 on Billboard's "60 Sexiest Songs of All Time".

== Charts ==
=== Weekly charts ===
Chart (1991–1992)	Peak position
Australia (ARIA)	68
Canada Retail Singles (The Record)	8
Canada Top Singles (RPM)	16
Canada Adult Contemporary (RPM)	32
Canada Dance/Urban (RPM)	4
Europe (European Hit Radio)	23
Ireland (IRMA)	29
Netherlands (Dutch Top 40 Tipparade)	8
Netherlands (Single Top 100)	52
UK Singles (Official Charts)	23
UK Airplay (Music Week)	12
UK Dance (Music Week)	5
UK Club Chart (Record Mirror)	39
US Billboard Hot 100	1
US Adult Contemporary (Billboard)	37
US Dance Club Songs (Billboard)	6
US Dance Singles Sales (Billboard)	3
US Hot R&B/Hip-Hop Songs (Billboard)	1
US Cash Box Top 100	1

=== Year-end charts ===
Chart (1991)	Position
US Billboard Hot 100	24
US 12-inch Singles Singles (Billboard)	35
US Hot R&B Singles (Billboard)	60
US Cash Box Top 100	8

== See also ==
- List of Billboard Hot 100 number ones of 1991
- List of Hot R&B Singles number ones of 1991
