= The Way I Feel About You =

Single by Karyn White

from the album Ritual of Love
- Released: November 7, 1991
- Recorded: 1991
- Studio: Flyte Tyme Studios (Minneapolis, Minnesota)
- Genre: New jack swing; R&B
- Length: 4:35
- Label: Warner; Flyte Tyme
- Songwriters: Christopher Troy; Zac Harmon; Karyn White
- Producers: Christopher Troy; Zac Harmon

Karyn White singles chronology
"Romantic" (1991)	"The Way I Feel About You" (1991)	"Walkin' the Dog" (1992)

"The Way I Feel About You" is a song by American R&B singer-songwriter Karyn White. It was released on November 7, 1991, by Warner and Flyte Tyme, from her second album, Ritual of Love (1991). White wrote the song with its producers, Christopher Troy and Zac Harmon. The song peaked at numbers three and 12 on the US Cash Box Top 100 and Billboard Hot 100 charts.

== Charts ==
=== Weekly charts ===
Chart (1991–1992)	Peak position
Australia (ARIA)	150
UK Singles (OCC)	65
UK Airplay (Music Week)	37
UK Dance (Music Week)	24
UK Club Chart (Music Week)	31
US Billboard Hot 100	12
US Hot R&B/Hip-Hop Songs (Billboard)	5
US Cash Box Top 100	3

=== Year-end charts ===
Chart (1992)	Position
US Billboard Hot 100	63
