= Michael Jeffries (singer) =

American R&B singer

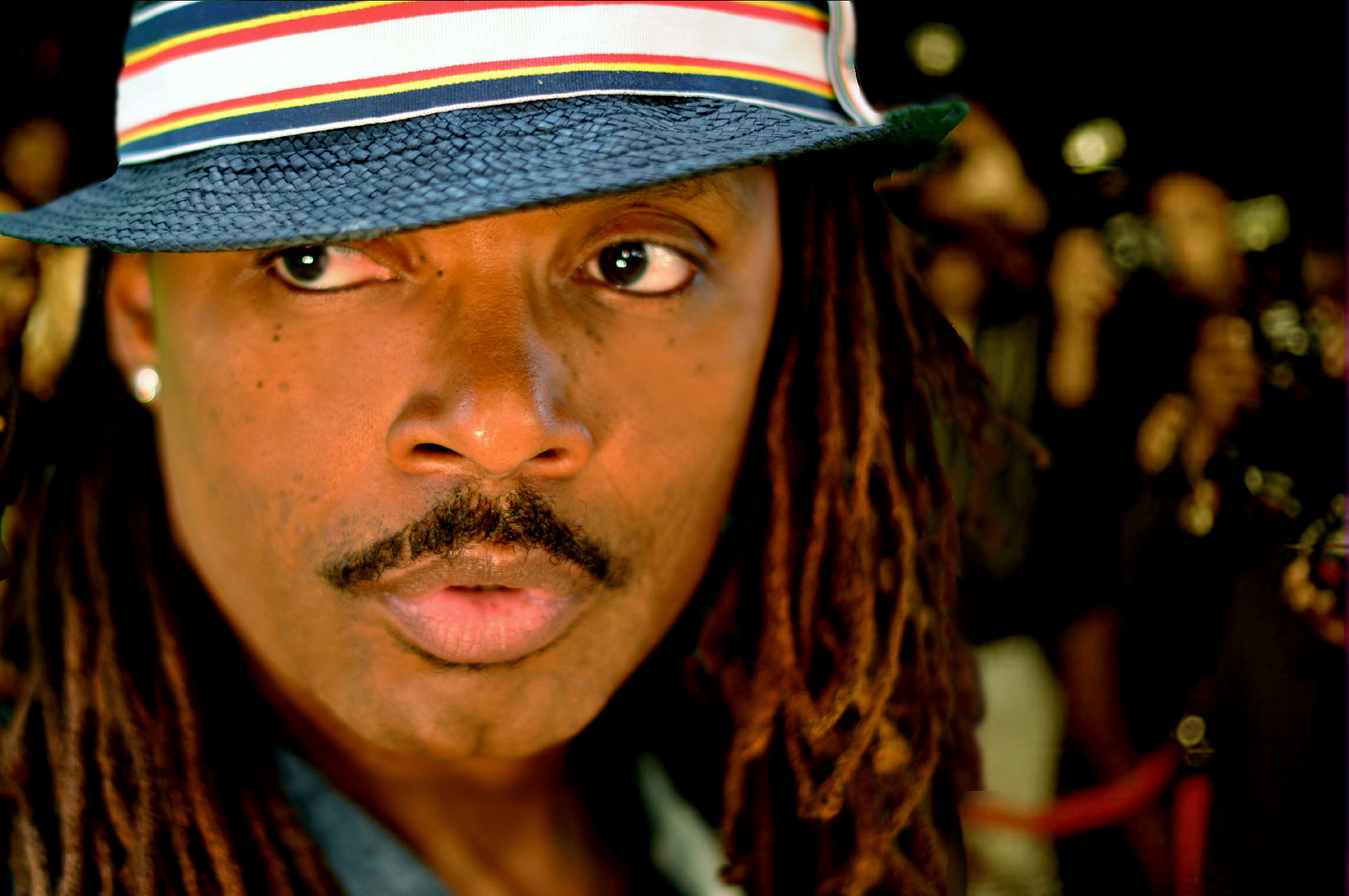

Background information
- Born: August 16, 1954 (age 70); Memphis, Tennessee, U.S.
- Genres: R&B; soul
- Occupations: Singer; songwriter
- Instruments: Vocals
- Years active: 1971–present
- Labels: Warner Bros.

Michael Jeffries (born August 16, 1954) is an American R&B singer from Memphis, Tennessee, best known for his stint as a lead vocalist for the R&B/soul band Tower of Power from 1978 to the mid-1980s.

== Biography ==
Jeffries started his career as part of the California band known as The Two Things in One and scored a regional hit with the 1973 single "Together Forever". It would lead to his stint with Tower of Power starting with 1978's We Came to Play! and he would stay with the band through the mid-1980s, making his tenure with Tower of Power the second longest as lead vocalist, behind Larry Braggs.

Jeffries later began a solo career releasing the single "Razzle Dazzle" in 1986, which was from the soundtrack to the movie Wildcats. He would also record with Jeff Lorber and fellow R&B singer Karyn White before releasing his first self-titled solo album for Warner Bros. Records; the same record label as Tower of Power. The album was produced by Janet Jackson's producers and former members of The Time Jimmy Jam and Terry Lewis.

Jeffries still lives in California and released a new album with his children as "Michael Jeffries, Daughter, Son" called Family Affair in 2011. Also in 2011, a compilation of his recordings with The Two Things in One was released called Together Forever: The Music City Sessions. In 2019, Jeffries released his next solo album Fonky Sexy Late Nights in the Lab and released a music video for "When We Love" off the album on his YouTube channel.

== Discography ==
=== Solo albums ===
- Michael Jeffries (Warner Bros. Records, 1989)
- Family Affair (MJM Artists Records, 2011)
- Fonky Sexy Late Nights in the Lab (MJM Artists Records, 2019)

=== Solo singles ===
Year	Title	Peak chart positions		
Year	Title	US R&B	US Dance	UK
1986	"Razzle Dazzle"	―	34	―
1986	"Back in Love" (with Jeff Lorber and Karyn White)	―	―	―
1989	"Teach Me"	―	―	―
1989	"Not Thru Being with You" (featuring Karyn White)	32	―	99
1992	"And I Love Her"	―	―	―
"—" denotes releases that did not chart.

=== Other appearances ===
==== With The Two Things in One ====
- "Silly Song" / "Snag Nasty" (Music City Records) (1971)
- "Together Forever" / "Stop Telling Me" (Music City Records) (1973)
- "Overdose" / "Close the Door" (Music City Records) (1974)
- Together Forever: The Music City Sessions (Omnivore Recordings) (2011)

==== With Skye ====
- "Ain't No Need" (single) (Anada Records/A&M Records) (1976)

==== With Tower of Power ====
- We Came to Play! (Columbia Records) (1978)
- Back on the Streets (Columbia Records) (1979)
- Direct (Sheffield Lab) (1981)
- Dinosaur Tracks (Rhino Handmade) (2000)

==== With Jeff Lorber ====
- Private Passion (Warner Bros. Records) (1986)
