= The Island of Real =

Studio album by the Rascals
- Released: 1972
- Genre: Soul, rock, jazz
- Length: 51:24
- Label: Columbia
- Producer: Felix Cavaliere

The Rascals chronology
Peaceful World (1971)	The Island of Real (1972)	The Very Best of The Rascals (1993)

The Island of Real is the ninth and final studio album by the rock band the Rascals, released in 1972. It peaked at number 180 on the Billboard 200 chart. The group's final four singles — “Lucky Day,” “Brother Tree,” “Hummin’ Song” and “Jungle Walk” — failed to make the Top 100 and the Rascals disbanded.

The album was reissued in 1999 by Sundazed Records with two previously unreleased bonus tracks and also reissued along with Peaceful World on the BGO label in 2008.

== Reception ==
Professional ratings
Review scores
Source	Rating
Allmusic	3/5 stars
Christgau's Record Guide	B−

Writing for Allmusic, critic Jim Newsom wrote that the album was "another great but overlooked album by the Rascals. With a groove at times like Tower of Power, at others like latter-day Sly & the Family Stone, this, the band's final recording, is worth seeking out." Music critic Robert Christgau wrote of the album; "You can hear Felix trying to get back as side one begins ... but as Buzzy Feiten starts tricking up his own "Jungle Walk," you wonder whether jungles are coy. And then you realize that there's a pink horse on the cover for a reason."

In his review for the reissue of Peaceful World/The Island of Real, critic Thom Jurek wrote of the album "This is a less overtly ambitious offering, but its sunny optimism, warm vibes, and reliance on the emerging urban spiritual soul coming from Los Angeles, the rhythmic toughness of Chicago, and stretched vocal harmonies from Philadelphia make it a quiet stunner. Some of Cavaliere's best songs are here..."

== Track listing ==
All songs by Felix Cavaliere unless otherwise noted.

1. "Lucky Day" – 3:09
2. "Saga of New York" – 4:03
3. "Be on the Real Side" (Robert Popwell) – 3:37
4. "Jungle Walk" (Buzz Feiten) – 3:05
5. "Brother Tree" – 3:38
6. "Island of Real" – 4:57
7. "Hummin' Song" – 3:58
8. "Echoes" – 3:10
9. "Buttercup" – 5:06
10. "Time Will Tell" – 4:07
11. "Lament" –6:10
  1999 reissue bonus tracks:
12. "Prove It" – 3:13
13. "Love Is a Woman" – 3:11

== Personnel ==
- Felix Cavaliere – vocals, keyboards, ARP synthesizer
- Dino Danelli – drums, percussion
- Howard "Buzz" Feiten – guitar, ARP synthesizer
- Annie Sutton – vocals, background vocals
- Robert Popwell – bass
- Hubert Laws – flute
- Louis Colin – harp
- Kwasi "Rocky" Dzidzornu – conga
- Joe Farrell – flute, saxophone
- Ralph MacDonald – conga
- Jack Scarangella – conga
- Daniel Ben Zebulon – conga
- Steve Madaio – trumpet
- David Sanborn – saxophone, horn
- Jon Smith – saxophone, horn
- Manny Stamm – flugelhorn
- Woodstock Horns – horns
- Molly Holt – background vocals
- Arthur Jenkins - arrangements on "Echoes" and "Buttercup"
