= Frank G. Ashbrook =

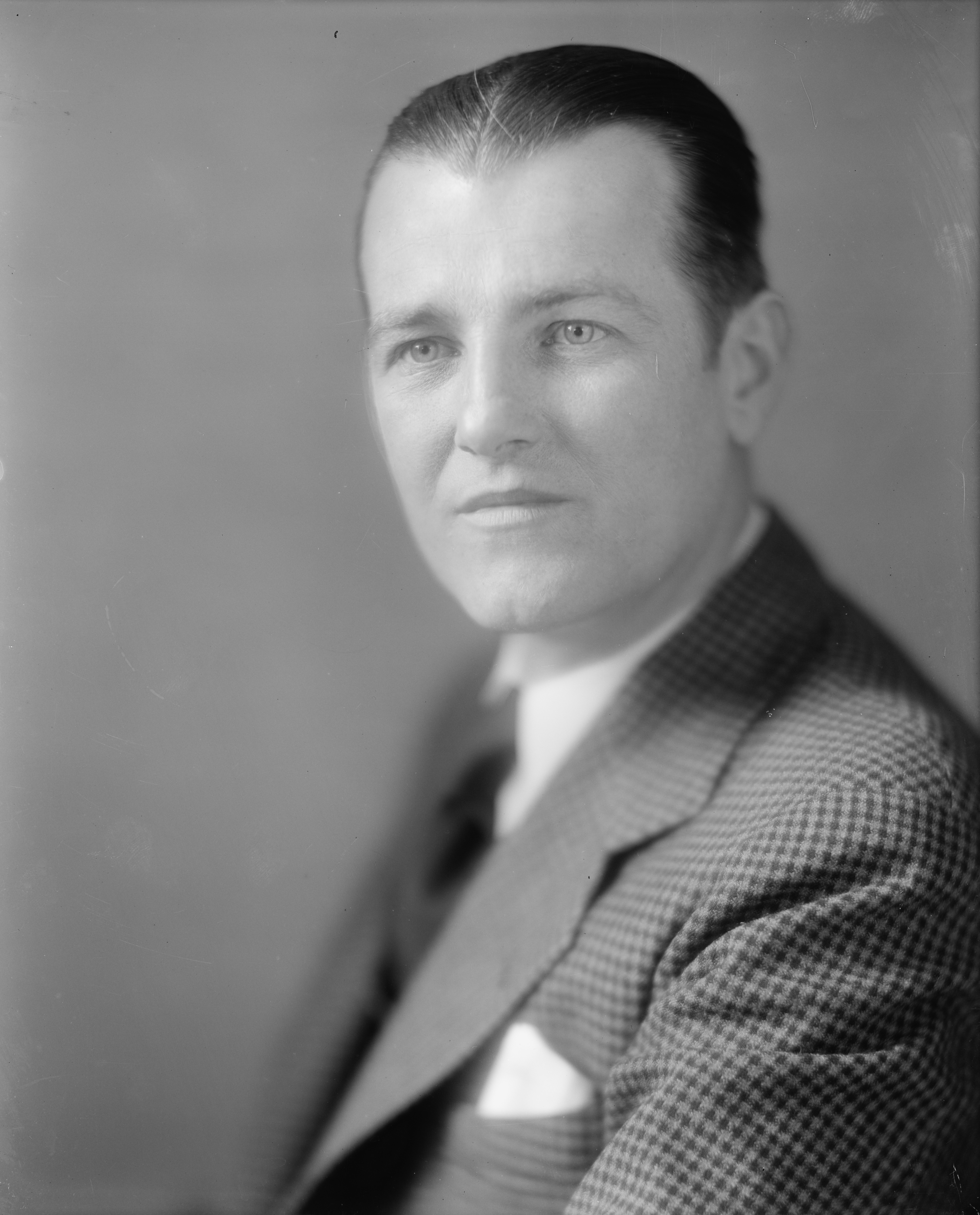
- Born: October 20, 1892
- Died: September 15, 1966 (aged 73)
- Scientific career
- Fields: Mammalogy
- Institutions: Fish and Wildlife Service, Animal Husbandry Research Division, United States Department of the Interior

Frank Getz Ashbrook (October 20, 1892 – September 15, 1966) was an American mammalogist.

== Biography ==
Ashbrook was born in 1892. In 1914, he was appointed as a Junior Animal Husbandman in the U.S. Department of Agriculture, and later on, in 1923, he was in charge of the fur animal experiment station that was located at Saratoga Springs in New York. While being a head of the Division of Fur Resources, in 1930, he got a job as a Commissioner General for the United States at the International Fur Trade Exposition and later at the Congress in Leipzig, Germany. He stayed with the Fish and Wildlife Service, which was a successor to Biological Survey, until he got promoted in 1957 as a Civilian-in-charge of Wild Fur Animal Investigations. He was the first head of such Division. The Division was transferred, with the Bureau, into the Department of the Interior in 1939, and in 1947 the functions that were related to breeding, producing, and marketing of the Division, were transferred and renamed into the Animal Husbandry Research Division, and became a part of the U.S. Department of Agriculture.
