= Guy Eckstine =

Music Executive, Artist Manager, Record Producer

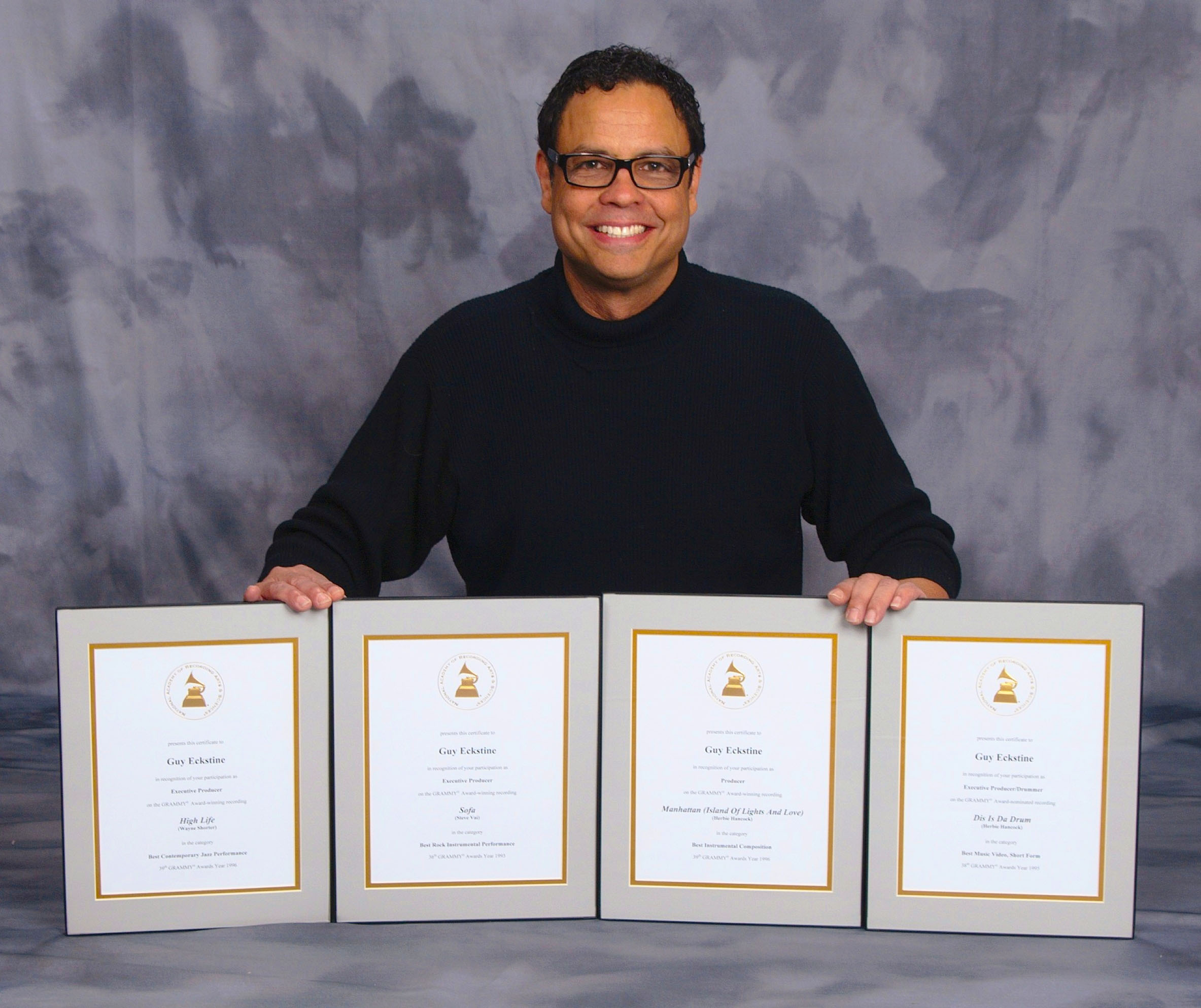
- Born: 1956 (age 69–70)
- Education: University of California, Los Angeles
- Occupations: Record producer; artist manager; A&R
- Parent: Billy Eckstine
- Website: Iconique Music Group

Guy Eckstine is an artist manager and record producer, also known for his tenure as A&R executive at Columbia Records, and Verve Records. Eckstine's work as a music producer has earned four Grammy® Awards and seven nominations, including with jazz keyboardist Herbie Hancock, on the Grammy® winning Hancock album The New Standard.

In 2007 he co-founded Iconique Music Group, an artist management, creative development, and record production company, currently representing Grammy® winners and nominees, Mike Stern, Simon Phillips, House Of Waters, Ricky Kej, Thana Alexa, Nir Felder, and Tiempo Libre.

In 2024 Eckstine Produced, House Of Waters album, On Becoming which earned a Grammy® Award nomination in the Best Contemporary Instrumental Album category. Iconique Music Group

== Family ==
Eckstine was born in 1956 to Grammy® Lifetime Achievement Award winner, American jazz/pop singer Billy Eckstine and his wife Carolle Drake, an actress and model. Eckstine's siblings include four older brothers and two younger sisters. The family eventually settled in Encino, California, where Eckstine was raised. His brother Ed later served as president of Mercury Records.

== Early Music Career ==
After studying Ethnomusicology at UCLA and percussion at California Institute of the Arts, in addition to his band Soma featuring Allan Holdsworth, Eckstine's early music career was as a touring and session drummer involved in various musical projects in Los Angeles for Quincy Jones, Billy Eckstine, James Ingram, Michael McDonald, Michael Henderson, Eddy Grant, and more.

== Virgin Music in America ==
As an A&R music publishing executive in the late 1980s, he was Creative Manager for Virgin Music Label & Artist Services, developing staff songwriters including, Allee Willis, Jon Lind, Derek Bramble, Elliot Wolf, and Oliver Leiber. Eckstine also secured song placements for Virgin Music songwriters with Whitney Houston, Vanessa Williams, Kool and the Gang, The Whispers. Eckstine was the Music Supervisor for the movie, Side Out and he signed a major publishing agreement with Avatar Music Publishing Avatar Records, featuring songwriters, Kipper Jones, and Kenny Harris.

== Columbia Records ==
As Director/A&R, from 1989 to 1991 Eckstine worked for Columbia Records, leading their West Coast Urban and Jazz A&R, developing artists, Shawn Smith, Sananda Maitreya/Terence Trent D'arby, Regina Belle, and Philip Bailey, among others.

== Verve Records ==
From 1991 to 1997 as VP, A&R Verve Records, fostered a period when Verve was praised for its creativity. For Verve Forecast Records, among others, Eckstine signed, Herbie Hancock, saxophonist Wayne Shorter, vocalist, Gino Vannelli and keyboardist Jeff Lorber. Trumpeter Chris Botti credited Eckstine for his decision to sign with Verve. Eckstine also signed an American record deal for British acid jazz group Incognito.

== MP3.com ==
Post Verve, from 1999 to 2002, Eckstine was Senior Vice President, Creative Development at the original MP3.com helming the jazz, world and classical music genres.

== Guy Eckstine Productions ==
From 2002- 2007 as an independent producer Eckstine produced and executive produced recordings by Brian Culbertson, Hubert Laws, Cyrus Chestnut, and Alexandra Scott, as well as securing recording contracts for Julia Fordham (Atlantic Records), and Carol Welsman (Savoy Label Group).

== Select Discography ==
- Herbie Hancock- "The New Standard,” Producer, (Grammy® Award Winner), "Dis Is Da Drum," Executive Producer (Verve/Universal) (Grammy® Nominee).
- Wayne Shorter- "High Life,” Executive Producer (Verve/Universal) (Grammy® Award Winner and multiple Grammy® Nominee)
- Mike Stern- “Echoes and Other Songs,” Executive Producer (Artistry Music/Mack Avenue)
- Chris Botti- "First Wish,” "Midnight Without You,” "Caught" (Soundtrack), Executive Producer (Verve/Universal)
- House Of Waters- “On Becoming,” (Grammy® Award Nominee ), "On Becoming: The Improv Sessions," "House Of Waters,” “Rising,” Producer (GroundUp Music)
- Zappa's Universe- "Zappa’s Universe,” (Grammy® Award Winner) Executive Producer (Verve/Universal)
- Ellis Ashbrook- “The Space Palace,” Producer (Independent)
- Brian Culbertson- "Nice And Slow," Executive Producer (Atlantic Records)
- Cyrus Chestnut & Friends- "A Charlie Brown Christmas," Producer (Atlantic Records)
- Gino Vannelli- "Yonder Tree,” "Slow Love, "Executive Producer (Verve/Universal)
- Hubert Laws- "Moondance," Producer (Savoy Label Group)
- Eilidh McKellar - "Delta Devil Dreams" Producer (Independent)
- Jeff Lorber- "Worth Waiting For,” "West Side Stories,” "State Of Grace," Executive Producer (Verve/Universal)
- Shawn Smith “Shawn Smith," Producer (Columbia/Sony)
- Pete Belasco- "Get It Together," Producer (Verve/Universal)
- Ricky Kej - “Gandhi- Mantras of Compassion” Associate Producer (Independent)
- Twin Danger - "Twin Danger,” Executive Producer (Decca/Universal Classics)
- Alexandra Scott- "Styrofoam," Producer (Independent)
- Justyna Kelley- "Over The Moon,” Producer (Independent)
- Incognito- "Inside Life,” "Tribes, Vibes and Scribes,” "Positivity," Executive Producer (Verve/Universal)
- Art Porter- "Pocket City,” "Straight To The Point,” "Undercover,” "Lay Your Hands On Me,” Executive Producer, "For Art's Sake" Producer (Verve/Universal)
- Svetlana & The Delancey Five - “Night At The Speakeasy,” Producer (Independent)
- Evan Marks- "Long Way Home,” "Three Day Weekend," Producer (Verve/Universal)
- The Bolts- “Wait ‘Till We’re Young,” “Fall,” Producer (Independent)
- Nailah Porter- "Conjazzness,” Executive Producer (EmArcy/Universal)
- Movement Ex- "Movement Ex," Executive Producer (Columbia/Sony Music)
- Feels Like Friday- "We Like Supermodels," Producer (Independent)
- Tom Grant- "In My Wildest Dreams,” "The View From Here,” "Hands," Executive Producer (Verve/Universal)
- Peter Delano- "Peter Delano,” (Producer), "Bite Of The Apple," Executive Producer (Verve/Universal)
- Ricardo Silveira- "Small World," Executive Producer (Verve/Universal)
- Various Artists- Playboy's 40th Anniversary: Four Decades of Jazz 1953–1993 Producer (Verve/Universal)
