= Buzz Feiten =

American singer-songwriter, guitarist, and luthier (born 1948)

Howard "Buzz" Feiten II
- Born: Howard Feiten; November 4, 1948 (age 77); New York, U.S.
- Genres: Jazz; adult contemporary; jazz fusion
- Occupations: guitarist; musical arranger; composer
- Instrument: Guitar
- Years active: 1966–present
- Labels: Horizon; Warner Bros.
- Formerly of: Paul Butterfield Blues Band, the Rascals, Full Moon, The Larsen-Feiten Band, Whirlies

Howard "Buzz" Feiten II (born November 4, 1948) is an American singer-songwriter, guitarist, session musician, and luthier. He is a lead and rhythm guitarist and patented a tuning system for guitars and similar instruments. Feiten also manufactures and markets solid-body electric guitars.

== Early years ==
Feiten grew up in Huntington Station and Centerport, New York, where he was known by schoolmates and friends as "Buzzy". The son of a musical mother, Pauline (a classical pianist), and an airline pilot, Howard Sr., Feiten received training in classical music as a child. His older sister Paula was a flautist and fashion model in the mid-1960s. A younger brother, Jon, was also involved in music and the arts. In youth, he studied several musical instruments, settling on the French horn. As a teenager, he played in all-county (Suffolk) and all-state (New York) youth orchestras on the instrument.

Feiten first played Carnegie Hall in 1966 on French horn in American Youth Performs. In 1966, he auditioned at the Juilliard School on French horn but was not admitted. In high school he fronted for a group called 'The Reasons Why' with Steve Beckmeier (rhythm guitar), Al Stegmeyer (drums), Danny Horton (lead guitar), and Daniel Kretzer (keyboards). The band was successful on Long Island, and two songs, "Tell Her One More Time" and "Same Old Worries", were mentioned in a Billboard 'new singles' article in the summer of 1966.

== Career ==
Still known as "Buzzy", in late 1968 or early 1969 Feiten was a student at the Mannes College of Music in New York City.

Feiten replaced Elvin Bishop in the Paul Butterfield Blues Band, and recorded on the group's fifth album, Keep on Moving. With Butterfield, Feiten toured internationally and played at the Atlantic City Pop Festival and the Woodstock Festival.

In 1970–71, Feiten stepped in as lead guitarist for a Long Island group, The Rascals (formerly 'The Young Rascals') on their albums Peaceful World and Island of Real.

His debut 'project' album Full Moon was released in 1972 by Warner Bros. and included band members Neil Larsen, Gene Dinwiddie, Phillip Wilson and Freddie Beckmeier, (brother of Steve from 'The Reasons Why'), with 'sidemen' Ray Barretto, Randy Brecker, Robin Clark, Dave Holland, Airto Moreira, and Tasha Thomas. A 2002 sequel, Buzz Feiten & The New Full Moon also featured Beckmeier on bass, Jai Winding, Brandon Fields , and Gary Mallaber. Another notable 1998-99 Feiten affiliation was with the Dave Weckl Band on the albums Rhythm of the Soul and Synergy.

The artists he has worked with include Gregg Allman, The Brecker Brothers, Bob Dylan, Aretha Franklin, Michael Franks, Al Jarreau, Rickie Lee Jones, Chaka Khan, Dave Koz, Neil Larsen, Kenny Loggins, Bette Midler, Olivia Newton-John, Wilson Pickett, David Sanborn, James Taylor, Stevie Wonder, Etta James, and Don McLean.

== Tuning system ==
Feiten patented a tuning system for guitars, marketed as the Buzz Feiten Tuning System, which is intended to correct problems of the standard equal temperament. The system can be retrofitted by a repair shop or luthier that has paid a licensing fee and received specific training. The system consists of a compensated string nut (or "shelf nut") and a method for intonating the bridge. The system was licensed to Washburn Guitars (1995–2010) and Suhr Guitars.

The tuning system is intended to create more accurate tonality of notes played on the lowest three or four frets.

== Guitars ==
In 2012, Feiten announced the founding of Buzz Feiten Guitars to manufacture and market solid-body electric guitars. The firm initially offered five models, the Blues Pro, T Pro, Signature Elite, Classic Pro, and Elite Pro.

In 2018, the company was renamed Buzz Feiten Guitar Research, and began offering three solid-body models with the brand name 'SuperNova': the 'Classic' (two humbucker pickups), the 'Futura' (bridge humbucker and neck single-coil pickup), and the 'Futura Super-Trem' (three single-coil pickups with synchronized vibrato). The "Buzz Feiten Tuning System" is mentioned only with regard to the Supernova Classic.

== Discography ==
=== As leader ===
- Larsen-Feiten Band (Warner Bros., 1980)
- Full Moon with Full Moon (Warner Bros., 1982)
- Whirlies (Ulftone Music, 2000)
- Buzz Feiten & the New Full Moon (Dreamsville, 2002)

=== As sideman ===
With Aretha Franklin

- Spirit in the Dark (Atlantic, 1970)
- Sweet Passion (Atlantic, 1977)
- Love All the Hurt Away (Arista, 1981)

With Rickie Lee Jones

- Rickie Lee Jones (Warner Bros., 1979)
- Pirates (Warner Bros., 1981)
- The Magazine (Warner Bros., 1984)
- Flying Cowboys (Geffen, 1989)

With Neil Larsen

- Jungle Fever (Horizon, 1978)
- High Gear (Horizon, 1979)
- Through Any Window (MCA, 1987)
- Smooth Talk (MCA, 1989)

With Jeff Lorber

- Private Passion (Warner Bros., 1986)
- Worth Waiting for (Verve Forecast, 1993)
- Midnight (Zebra, 1998)

With Love

- Reel to Real (RSO, 1974)

With The McCrarys

- On the Other Side (Portrait, 1979)

With Adam Mitchell

- Redhead in Trouble (Warner Bros. Records, 1979)

With Bill Quateman

- Just Like You (RCA Victor, 1979)
- The Almost Eve of Everything (Next of Skin, 2001)
- Trust (Dreamsville, 2002)

With David Sanborn

- Taking Off (Warner Bros., 1975)
- Voyeur (Warner Bros., 1981)
- As We Speak (Warner Bros., 1982)
- Backstreet (Warner Bros., 1983)

With Tom Scott

- Street Beat (Columbia, 1979)
- Desire (Elektra Musician, 1982)
- Smokin' Section (Windham Hill, 1999)

With Dave Weckl

- Rhythm of the Soul (Stretch, 1998)
- Synergy (Stretch, 1999)
- The Zone (Stretch, 2001)

With others

- Deborah Allen, Cheat the Night (RCA, 1983)
- Gregg Allman, Laid Back (Capricorn, 1973)
- Anri, Boogie Woogie Mainland (For Life, 1988)
- Jeff Baxter, Guitar Workshop in L.A. (Invitation, 1988)
- Stephen Bishop, Red Cab to Manhattan (Warner Bros., 1980)
- Butterfield Blues Band, Keep on Moving (Atco, 1969)
- Paul Butterfield, Live at Rockpalast 1978 (MIG, 2019)
- Doug Cameron, Journey to You (Narada, 1991)
- Luis Cardenas, Animal Instinct (Allied Artists, 2012)
- Felix Cavaliere, Destiny (Bearsville, 1975)
- Felix Cavaliere, Castles in the Air (Epic, 1979)
- Chicago, Chicago 18 (Warner Bros., 1986)
- Christophe, Pas Vu Pas Pris (Motors, 1980)
- Don Ciccone, Forever Begins Today (Polydor, 1991)
- Gene Clark, No Other (Asylum, 1974)
- Tyler Collins, Girls Nite Out (RCA, 1989)
- Commander Cody, Flying Dreams (Arista, 1978)
- Paul Cotton, Changing Horses (Sisapa, 1990)
- Randy Crawford, Windsong (Warner Bros., 1982)
- Phil Cristian, No Prisoner (Empire, 1988)
- Dino, 24/7 (4th & Broadway, 1989)
- Dr. John, City Lights (Horizon, 1978)
- Bob Dylan, New Morning (Columbia, 1970)
- Michael Franks, Blue Pacific (Reprise, 1990)
- Rosie Gaines, Closer than Close (Motown, 1995)
- Steve Grossman, Perspective (Atlantic, 1979)
- Hall & Oates, Change of Season (Arista, 1990)
- Lani Hall, Double or Nothing (A&M, 1979)
- Stuart Hamm, Kings of Sleep (Food for Thought, 1989)
- Stuart Hamm, The Urge (Relativity, 1991)
- Jimi Hendrix, Blues at Midnight (Rock of Ages, 2000)
- Stix Hooper, Touch the Feeling (MCA, 1982)
- Janis Ian, Restless Eyes (Columbia, 1981)
- Janis Ian, Uncle Wonderful (Interfusion, 1985)
- Toshiki Kadomatsu, Reasons for Thousand Lovers (Om, 1989)
- Thomas Jefferson Kaye, Not Alone (Hudson Canyon, 1992)
- Bobby King & Terry Evans, Rhythm, Blues, Soul & Grooves (Special Delivery, 1990)
- Al Kooper, Black Coffee (Sony, 2005)
- Dave Koz, Dave Koz (Capitol, 1990)
- Dave Koz, Lucky Man (Capitol, 1993)
- Labelle, Pressure Cookin' (RCA, 1973)
- Kenny Loggins, Vox Humana (Columbia, 1985)
- Melissa Manchester, Emergency (Arista, 1983)
- Bobby Martin, Bobby Martin (Sunset Dreams, 2016)
- Murray McLauchlan, Murray McLauchlan (True North, 1972)
- Don McLean, Don McLean (United Artists, 1972)
- Don McLean, Playin' Favorites (United Artists, 1973)
- Gary Meek, Gary Meek (Lipstick, 1991)
- Bette Midler, No Frills (Atlantic, 1983)
- Bette Midler, Bette of Roses (Atlantic, 1995)
- Luis Miguel, Busca Una Mujer (WEA, 1988)
- Jason Miles, Mr. X (Lightyear, 1996)
- Stephanie Mills, Merciless (Casablanca, 1983)
- Mr. Mister, Pull (Little Dume, 2010)
- Alannah Myles, Rockinghorse (Atlantic, 1992)
- Randy Newman, Born Again (Warner Bros., 1979)
- Randy Newman, Land of Dreams (Reprise, 1988)
- Claus Ogerman & Michael Brecker, Cityscape (Mosaic, 1982)
- Amii Ozaki, Arrows in My Eyes (TM Factory, 1998)
- Dolly Parton, Dolly, Dolly, Dolly (RCA Victor, 1980)
- Wilson Pickett, American Soul Man (Motown, 1987)
- Aileen Quinn, Bobby's Girl (Columbia, 1982)
- The Rascals, Peaceful World (Columbia, 1971)
- The Rascals, The Island of Real (Columbia, 1972)
- Brenda Russell, Love Life (A&M, 1981)
- Evie Sands, Suspended Animation (RCA Victor, 1979)
- Boz Scaggs, Other Roads (Columbia, 1988)
- Ben Sidran, The Cat and the Hat (Horizon, 1979)
- Edwin Starr, Stronger Than You Think I Am (20th Century Fox, 1980)
- Curtis Stigers, Curtis Stigers (Arista, 1991)
- Livingston Taylor, Over the Rainbow (Capricorn, 1973)
- Tanya Tucker, Should I Do It (MCA, 1981)
- Dwight Twilley, Jungle (EMI, 1984)
- Jennifer Warnes, Shot Through the Heart (Arista, 1979)
- Tim Weisberg, Party of One (MCA, 1980)
- Bruce Willis, The Return of Bruno (Motown, 1987)
- Bruce Willis, If It Don't Kill You, It Just Makes You Stronger (Motown, 1989)
- Stevie Wonder, Music of My Mind (Tamla, 1972)
- Betty Wright, Betty Wright (Epic, 1981)
- Gary Wright, Headin' Home (Warner Bros., 1979)
- Syreeta Wright, Syreeta (MoWest, 1972)
- Jesse Colin Young, The Perfect Stranger (Elektra, 1982)
