= Secret Rendezvous (song) =

1989 single by Karyn White

Single by Karyn White

from the album Karyn White
- B-side: "Tell Me Tomorrow"
- Released: May 1989
- Recorded: 1988
- Studio: Silverlake Sound (Los Angeles)
- Genre: New jack swing
- Length: 5:38
- Label: Warner Bros.
- Songwriters: Kenneth Edmonds; Antonio Reid; Daryl Simmons
- Producers: L.A. Reid; Babyface

Karyn White singles chronology
"Love Saw It" (1989)	"Secret Rendezvous" (1989)	"Slow Down" (1989)

"Secret Rendezvous" is a song recorded by American singer Karyn White, from her debut studio album of the same name, and serves as the fourth single from the album. The song was written by Kenneth "Babyface" Edmonds, Antonio "L.A." Reid and Daryl Simmons, and produced by Reid and Babyface, who were at the peak of their success at the time as a songwriting and production team.

In the United States, it went to number one on the Billboard dance chart. On other Billboard charts, "Secret Rendezvous" went to number four on the R&B chart and number six on the pop chart. It was White's biggest hit at that time. Overseas, it peaked at number 22 on the UK Singles Chart.

== Track listing and formats ==
7-inch vinyl single (USA)

1. Secret Rendezvous (Edit) – 3:58
2. Tell Me Tomorrow (LP Version) – 4:54

12-inch vinyl single, promo (USA)

1. Secret Rendezvous (12" House Version) – 7:25
2. Secret Rendezvous (Secret Drive-Time Radio Edit) – 4:02
3. Secret Rendezvous (12" Dance Mix) – 7:15

12-inch vinyl single (USA, UK, Germany)

1. Secret Rendezvous (Zanzibar Mix) – 6:00
2. Secret Rendezvous (12" White House Remix) – 7:24
3. Secret Rendezvous (Bacepella) – 6:06

12-inch vinyl single (UK)

1. Secret Rendezvous (After Hour Mix)
2. Secret Rendezvous (Extended Mix)
3. Secret Rendezvous (Dub-Dez-Vous Mix)

12-inch vinyl single (USA)

1. Secret Rendezvous (Extended Remix) – 6:58
2. Secret Rendezvous (12" White House Remix) – 7:18
3. Secret Rendezvous (Bacepella) – 6:01
4. Secret Rendezvous (After Hours Mix) – 7:25
5. Secret Rendezvous (12" Dance Mix) – 7:20
6. Tell Me Tomorrow (LP Version) – 4:54

CD maxi-single, promo (USA)

1. Secret Rendezvous (Single Edit) – 3:58
2. Secret Rendezvous (Secret Drive Time Radio Edit) – 4:02
3. Secret Rendezvous (White House Radio Edit Version) – 5:30
4. Secret Rendezvous (After Hours Mix) – 7:25
5. Secret Rendezvous (After Hours Edit) – 4:00

Mini CD (Germany)

1. Secret Rendezvous (7" Version) – 4:06
2. Secret Rendezvous (After Hour Mix) – 7:27
3. Secret Rendezvous (Extended Mix) – 6:54

Mini CD (Germany)

1. Secret Rendezvous (Edit) – 4:05
2. Secret Rendezvous (Zanzibar Mix) – 6:03
3. Secret Rendezvous (12" White House Remix) – 7:25

== Charts ==
=== Weekly charts ===
Chart (1989)	Peak position
Canada Top Singles (RPM)	14
Canada Dance/Urban (RPM)	11
UK Singles (Official Charts Company)	22
US Billboard Hot 100	6
US Hot Dance/Club Play (Billboard)	1
US Hot Crossover 30 (Billboard)	1
US Hot Black Singles (Billboard)	4
US Dance Tracks (Dance Music Report)	1

=== Year-end charts ===
Chart (1989)	Position
United States (Billboard)	69
