= Neil Larsen =

American jazz keyboardist (born 1948)

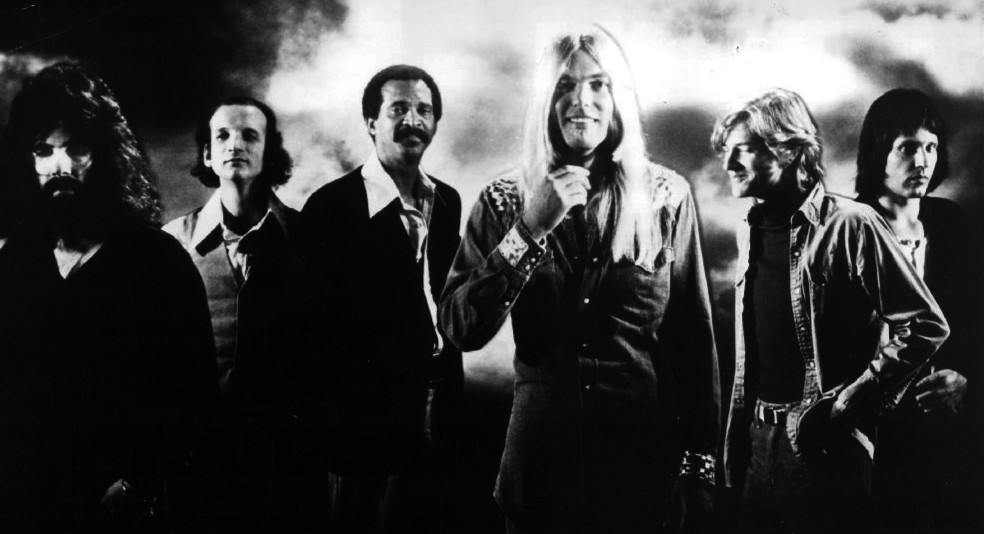
- Neil Larsen (second from right) as part of the Gregg Allman Band in 1977

Background information
- Born: August 7, 1948 (age 78); Cleveland, Ohio, U.S.
- Origin: Sarasota, Florida, U.S.
- Genres: Jazz; adult contemporary; jazz fusion
- Occupations: Keyboardist; musical arranger; composer
- Instruments: Piano; Hammond organ
- Years active: 1972–present
- Labels: A&M; Horizon; Warner Bros.; Portico
- Formerly of: Soul Survivors, Full Moon, The Larsen-Feiten Band
- Website: neillarsen.net

Neil Larsen (born August 7, 1948) is an American jazz/jazz fusion keyboardist, musical arranger and composer. He was born in Cleveland, Ohio and grew up in Sarasota, Florida before relocating to New York and then, in 1977, Los Angeles.

== Early life ==
Larsen was born in Cleveland, Ohio and grew up in Sarasota, Florida. Larsen graduated from Riverview High School in 1966. He learned piano, drawing inspiration from jazz artists John Coltrane, Miles Davis and the Modern Jazz Quartet, and from contemporary rock acts.

In 1969, he was drafted to serve in the Vietnam War. During his time in Vietnam, he worked as a band director, co-ordinating musical entertainment for US armed forces personnel. After his discharge, he moved to New York to work as a musician.

== Career ==
While in New York in the early 1970s, Larsen wrote television jingles and played on sessions for various recording artists. He formed the band Full Moon with jazz guitarist Buzz Feiten, and their self-titled debut album was released in 1972. Larsen was briefly a member of the Soul Survivors. He contributed as keyboardist, writer and arranger on their 1974 self-titled album on the TSOP label. He began touring as a member of Gregg Allman's band in 1975.

In 1977, Larsen relocated to Los Angeles, where he played on sessions by producers such as Tommy LiPuma, Russ Titelman and Herb Alpert. These projects led to Larsen signing with Alpert's record company, A&M Records, for which he recorded on the Horizon label. Larsen's debut studio album, Jungle Fever, was released in September 1978. Larsen toured the US in support of the release with a band that included Feiten.

The title track from his second studio album, High Gear, was nominated for the 1980 Grammy Award for Best Rock Instrumental Performance. The album peaked at number 139 on the Billboard Top LPs & Tape chart in the US and included musical contributions from Feiten, Michael Brecker, Steve Gadd and Paulinho da Costa.

Larsen collaborated further with Feiten in the jazz–rock fusion group the Larsen-Feiten Band. A self-titled album The Larsen-Feiten Band was released in 1980 on Warner Bros. Records. He has also recorded and toured with guitarist Robben Ford, who contributed to Larsen's 2007 album Orbit.

From 1982 to 1983, he was a member of Kenny Loggins' touring band, playing keyboards and synthesizers.

His compositions have also been recorded by George Benson and Gregg Allman, among others. Larsen took part in Miles Davis's Rubberband sessions in 1985–86, which were later released in 2019. His song "Carnival" was later adapted by Davis into the piece "Carnival Time".

Larsen has worked as a session musician for many rock artists, including Rickie Lee Jones, George Harrison, Kenny Loggins and Don McLean. He was the pianist and musical arranger for the 20th Century Fox Television show Boston Legal, and musical director for jazz singer Al Jarreau.

From 2008, he toured and recorded as a member of Leonard Cohen's band. Larsen performed on Cohen's Old Ideas (2012) album and on the singer's final world tour, in 2012–13. Cohen regularly introduced him on stage as "today's foremost exponent of the Hammond B-3 organ".

== Discography ==
- Full Moon: Full Moon (Douglas/Epic, 1972)
- Soul Survivors: Soul Survivors (TSOP, 1974)
- Jungle Fever (Horizon/A&M, 1978)
- High Gear (Horizon/A&M, 1979)
- Larsen-Feiten Band (Warner Bros., 1980)
- Full Moon featuring Neil Larsen & Buzz Feiten (Warner Bros., 1982)
- Through Any Window (MCA, 1987)
- Smooth Talk (MCA, 1989)
- Full Moon: Full Moon Live (Dreamsville [Japan], 2002) – live rec. 1980–83
- Orbit (Straight Ahead, 2007)
- Forlana (Portico, 2015)
