= Make Him Do Right =

Studio album by Karyn White
- Released: September 27, 1994
- Recorded: 1993–1994
- Studio: Flyte Tyme Studios (Edina, Minnesota); Larrabee Sound Studios; Music Grinder Studios (Los Angeles, California); Doppler Studios (Atlanta, Georgia)
- Genre: R&B
- Length: 54:37
- Label: Warner Bros.
- Producer: Jimmy Jam and Terry Lewis; Babyface; Karyn White; Jellybean Johnson; Daryl Simmons

Karyn White chronology
Ritual of Love (1991)	Make Him Do Right (1994)	Carpe Diem (2012)

Singles from Make Him Do Right
- 1. "Hungah" Released: August 29, 1994; 2. "Can I Stay With You" Released: November 15, 1994; 3. "I'd Rather Be Alone" Released: March 28, 1995

Make Him Do Right is the third album by the American singer Karyn White, released in 1994. Its first single was "Hungah".

== Critical reception ==
Professional ratings
Review scores
Source	Rating
AllMusic	3/5 stars
Knoxville News Sentinel	1.5/5 stars

The Knoxville News Sentinel deemed the album "a lifeless recording overloaded with braindead ballads." The Philadelphia Inquirer wrote that the album "forces [White] more into New Jill Swing-dom, rather than adult contemporary rhythm and blues."

== Track listing ==
No.	Title	Writer(s)	Length
1.	"Hungah"	James Harris, Terry Lewis, Karyn White	4:26
2.	"Can I Stay With You"	Babyface	5:38
3.	"Weakness"	Harris, Lewis, White	4:22
4.	"Nobody But My Baby"	McKinley Horton, Lewis	5:05
5.	"Here Comes the Pain Again"	Babyface	4:27
6.	"I'd Rather Be Alone"	Harris, Stanley Howard, Gary Johnson, Lewis, White	5:30
7.	"Make Him Do Right"	Daryl Simmons	5:07
8.	"Simple Pleasures"	Harris, Lewis, White	4:36
9.	"I'm Your Woman"	Harris, Horton, Lewis, White	5:19
10.	"Thinkin' 'Bout Love"	Harris, Lewis, White, Jimmy Wright	5:13
11.	"One Minute"	Wright, Lewis, Harris, White	4:54
Total length:			54:37

== Production ==
- Executive producers: Jimmy Jam, Terry Lewis, Benny Medina, Karyn White
- Producers: Babyface, McKinley Horton, Jimmy Jam, Terry Lewis, Jellybean Johnson, Daryl Simmons, Karyn White
- Drum programming: Babyface, Jeff Taylor, Daryl Simmons
- Mastering: Tom Baker
- Engineer: David Betancourt, Eric Fischer, Brad Gilderman, Steve Hodge, Thom "TK" Kidd, Jeff Taylor, Willie Williams
- Assistant engineer: David Betancourt, Eric Fischer, Alex Lowe, Jason Shablik, Jeff Taylor, Will Williams
- Mixing: Steve Hodge, Mick Guzauski
- Production coordination: Ivy Skoff

== Personnel ==
- Keyboards: Lance Alexander, Babyface, McKinley Horton, Lisa Keith, Daryl Simmons, Jimmy Wright
- Guest artist: Babyface, Jimmy Jam, Lisa Keith, Terry Lewis
- Background vocals: Babyface, Lisa Bass, Valerie Davis, Carrie Harrington, Lisa Keith, Prof. T., Tanya Smith, Billy Steele, Libby Turner, Karyn White, Jimmy Wright
- Arranger: McKinley Horton, Jimmy Jam, Jellybean Johnson, Terry Lewis, Karyn White
- String arrangements: Lee Blaske
- Multi instruments: Jimmy Jam, Terry Lewis
- Viola: Evelina Chao
- Violin: Carolyn Daws, Hanley Daws, Helen Foli, John Kennedy, Tom Kornacker, Melinda Marshall, Michal Sobieski, Daria Tedeschi
- Bass: Nathan East, Ronnie Garrett, Mark Haynes
- Cello: Sarah Lewis, Laura Sewell, Daryl Skobba
- Guitar: Jellybean Johnson, Kevin Pierce, Michael Scott
- Harp: Andrea Stern
- Acoustic guitar: Mike Scott
- Clarinet: Ken Holmen
- Flute: Ken Holmen
- Drums: Daryl Simmons, Stokley Williams
- Percussion: Stokley Williams

== Charts ==
=== Weekly charts ===
Chart (1994)	Peak position
US Billboard 200	99
US Top R&B/Hip-Hop Albums (Billboard)	22

=== Year-end charts ===
Chart (1995)	Position
US Top R&B/Hip-Hop Albums (Billboard)	74
