= Phil Cristian =

American musician

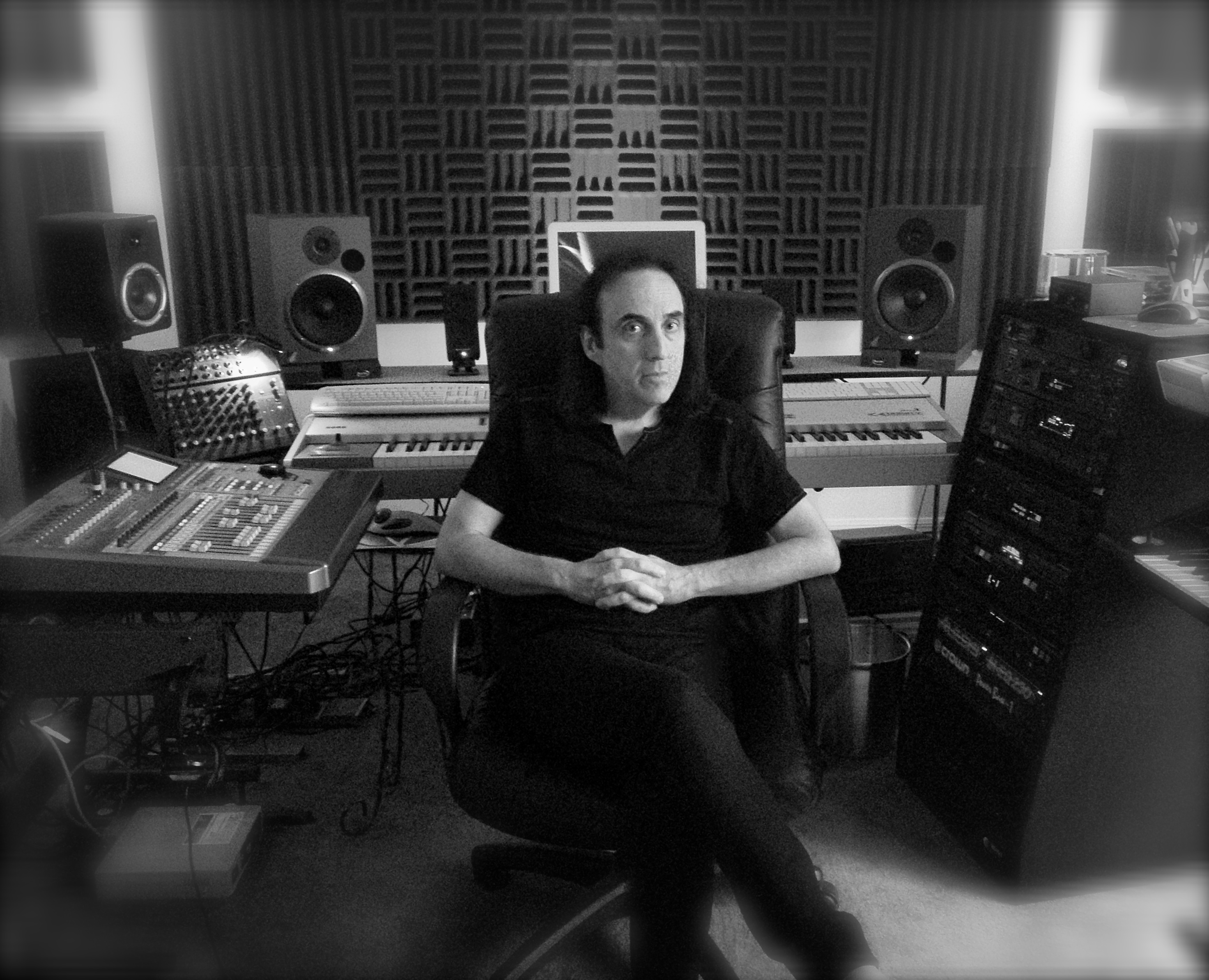
Magic Cristian, June 2012

Phil Cristian, aka Magic Cristian, is an American keyboardist and singer.

He is best known for being 'Magic' Cristian, the touring keyboardist and background singer for the rock band Cheap Trick.

== Pre Cheap Trick ==
After relocating to Los Angeles from Fresno, California, in 1973 he was hired by a high-profile cover band Corroboree. After a number of years in the thriving local club scene they disbanded, with Cristian and two other band mates forming the band Fortress. Record labels Chrysalis and MCA showed interest in the band and they recorded a demo paid for by MCA. MCA eventually passed on the band due to the emergence of the 1980s punk and new wave scene. Fortress went on to be a popular cover band, which shortly before disbanding in 1981 hired Mark Norton (aka Mark St. John) on guitar. Norton and Cristian then went on to form the band Front Page.

On one of the bands Orange County club dates, members of the Micki Free band were in the audience and expressed interest in Cristian becoming their keyboard player for an upcoming tour. Cristian auditioned and was chosen to be a member of the Micki Free Band for the tour. They were managed by Diana Ross and produced by Gene Simmons of Kiss. The Micki Free Band, which also featured bassist Jon Brant, toured with Diana Ross as her opening act in late 1981. Norton went on to become the guitarist for Kiss for a short time in 1984 and died April 5, 2007.

== With Cheap Trick 1982 - 1985 ==
Jon Brant subsequently went on to join Cheap Trick following the departure of bassist Tom Petersson and when the group expressed interest in having a touring keyboardist, Brant submitted Cristian's name. Cristian received a call from the band's manager Ken Adamany in 1982 and flew to Chicago for an audition. After the audition, Cristian and the band flew back to California as Cheap Trick were filming videos for the One On One album in Los Angeles. Weeks later, Cristian received a call from Adamany informing him that he was indeed hired for the tour. He was the first keyboard player to tour nationally with the group between 1982–1985, as mentioned in Cheap Trick's biography. His first recording experience with the band came in 1984, recording demo versions of the song "Love Comes" and the title track for the movie "Teachers". He also played keyboards and sang backup on the "Up The Creek" movie soundtrack, making a cameo appearance in the accompanying video.

== Solo ==
In 1986, after signing a songwriting deal with a small record company, he wrote and co-wrote songs for the 1987 album Flamingo Orkestra featuring Cynthia Manley. The album was co-produced by Stevie Wonder alums Robert Margouleff and trumpeter Steve Madaio. A demo of one of his songs featured a duet with Billy Preston and Sharon "Muffy" Hendrix, a backup singer for Barry Manilow and Tom Jones.

He subsequently recorded his solo album No Prisoner, released in 1988 and a group album, Big Mouth's Hands Of Time, recorded in 1994 but not released that year. Both album masters were eventually sold to a Swedish record company and re-released in 1997. He went on to become the music producer / musical director for country singer and "Hee Haw Honey" Zella Lehr.

In 1999, Magic Cristian was considered to be involved with Cheap Trick's 25th Anniversary performance in Rockford, IL. along with former touring keyboardist Tod Howarth and former bassist Jon Brant, but efforts to contact him were unsuccessful.

In 2002 Magic Cristian joined Cheap Trick onstage for an impromptu performance in Ft. Lauderdale, Fl, his first time performing with them in 16 years.

In 2005, Cristian became co-owner of a premier South Florida production company, producing large stage shows for Performing Arts Theaters and outdoor city events.

== With Cheap Trick 2008 - 2012 ==
On November 21, 2008, Magic Cristian was invited to join Cheap Trick to perform the Beatles' Sgt. Pepper's Lonely Hearts Club Band album in its entirety at Ruth Eckerd Hall in Clearwater, Florida. They performed with the 24-piece Florida Rock Orchestra, a sitar and tabla drum ensemble, guitarist Bill Lloyd of Foster and Lloyd and special guest Donovan. Overseeing the live concert sound production was the former Beatles recording engineer Geoff Emerick.

In the summer of 2009 Cheap Trick along with Magic Cristian providing keyboards and back up vocals, completed a 41 city North American tour along with Poison and Def Leppard.

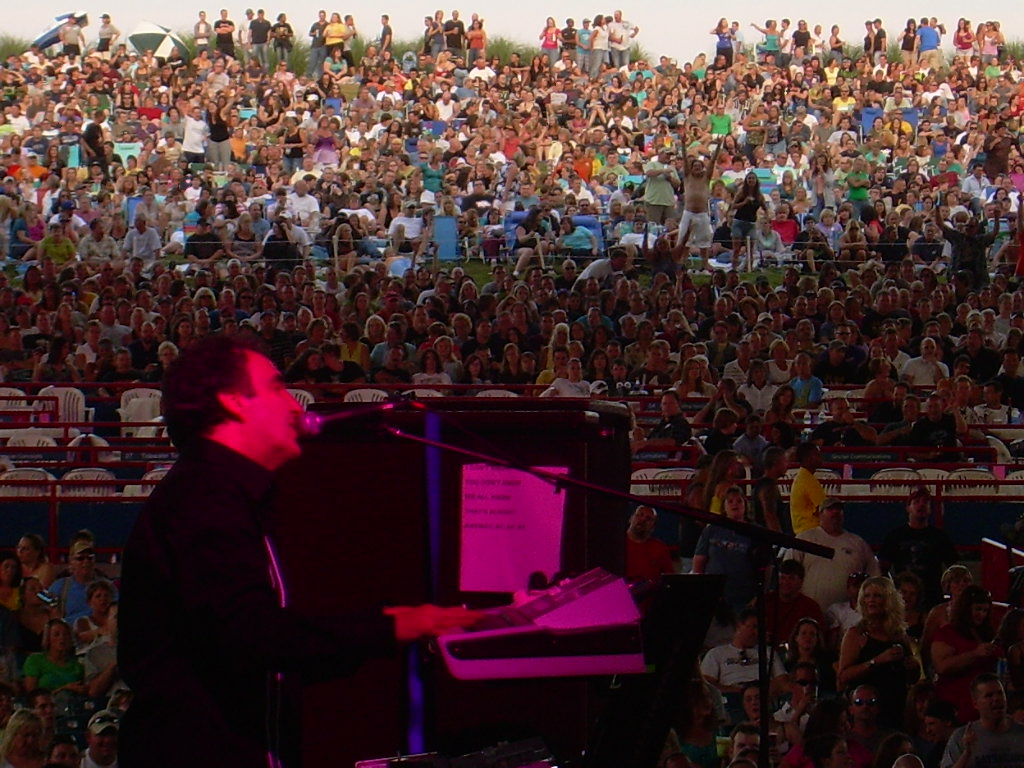

In September 2009, he performed in nine "Sgt. Pepper Live featuring Cheap Trick" shows at the Las Vegas Hilton along with renowned conductor Edwin Outwater and his orchestra with special guests Joan Osborne, Ian Ball of Gomez and singer songwriter Rob Laufer.

On November 7, 2009 Cheap Trick and the Cleveland Pops Orchestra, conducted by Carl Tipolow, performed a special selection of songs from the Beatles' "Sgt. Pepper's Lonely Hearts Club Band" album in a concert setting for figure skater Scott Hamilton. Each Cheap Trick band member is a longtime friend of Hamilton, and they performed this special music at his personal request.

Cheap Trick continued to tour in 2010 with Magic Cristian on keyboards and backing vocals and Rick Nielsen's son Daxx joining the tour on the drums.

From June 2010 to August 2010, "Sgt. Pepper Live featuring Cheap Trick" was performed at the Paris Theater in Las Vegas. In this version the production was the Beatles Sgt. Pepper album in its entirety and selected Cheap Trick songs performed with Edwin Outwater and the Orchestra, Bill Lloyd on guitar, The Sitar and Tabla Drum Ensemble and six background singers. Geoff Emerick, who engineered and recorded the Beatles Sgt. Pepper album, was also on hand to oversee the live sound production.

Also in 2010 Cheap Trick, with Magic Cristian and special guest Jellyfish keyboardist Roger Manning Jr., filmed three HD Concerts for HD Net, PBS' Austin City Limits and Front Row Center.

Cheap Trick toured North America late 2010 co-headlining with the British group Squeeze and Blondie. They also headlined a United Kingdom tour in November, and while in London were presented the Best Classic Rock Album award for Live At Budokan at the British Classic Rock Roll of Honour Awards. They performed live at the event for audience members including Ron Wood of the Rolling Stones, Keith Emerson of ELP, Rick Wakeman of Yes, Jimmy Page and John Paul Jones of Led Zeppelin, Glenn Hughes of Deep Purple, Geddy Lee of Rush, Neal Schon of Journey, Tony Iommi of Black Sabbath and Alice Cooper who emceed the event.

In January and February 2011, Cheap Trick performed the album Dream Police featuring The Bombastic Symphonic Philharmonic With The Rhythmic Noise Mind Choir along with Rick Nielsen's son Miles on guitar.

On June 11, 2011 Cheap Trick performed at the prestigious Download Festival in Donington, England. They went on from there to tour Germany as special guests for guitar legend Jeff Beck. From Germany it was on to the Netherlands, Portugal and then Spain before heading back to the States.

On July 17, 2011, Magic Cristian was onstage with Cheap Trick as they were performing at Blues Fest in Ottawa, Ontario, Canada. 20 minutes into Cheap Trick’s set, a thunderstorm blew through the festival area, causing the 40-ton roof to fall on and destroy much of the band's equipment. It fell away from the audience and landed on the band's truck which was parked alongside the back of the stage, breaking the fall and allowing everyone onstage about 30 seconds to escape. Two days later, they performed with rental gear for over 15,000 fans in Lewiston, NY.

In November 2011, Cheap Trick were special guests for a Deep Purple and Orchestra tour of the UK, ending the run at the prestigious O2 Arena in London. They closed out 2011 with a New Year's Eve performance of Dream Police with Orchestra at Jannus Live in St.Petersburg, FL.

== Post Cheap Trick 2012 - present ==
In March 2012, Magic Cristian was informed that the band would tour without keyboards opening for Aerosmith on their Global Warming Tour.

May 8, 2012 marked 30 years since Magic Cristian first stepped onstage with Cheap Trick. They performed for over 40,000 people along with Joan Jett and the Blackhearts and Chuck Berry at San Diego Stadium in San Diego, California May 8, 1982.

On July 13, 2013, Cheap Trick performed with Magic Cristian and the Great Falls Symphony Orchestra in Great Falls, Montana. On August 31, 2013, Cheap Trick performed with Magic Cristian, the Ravinia Symphony Orchestra with Bennett Salvay conducting, Gingger Shankar's Indian Trio, The Mind Choir and special guest guitarist Jimmy Vivino in Chicago IL. They performed two albums, Sgt. Pepper's Lonely Hearts Club Band and Cheap Trick at Budokan. The same concert was performed again on September 11, 2013 in Puyallup, Washington, with the Tacoma Symphony Orchestra and guest guitarist Bill Lloyd.

On Sunday October 12, 2014 Magic Cristian was invited to perform with Cheap Trick at the Parker Playhouse in Ft. Lauderdale Fl.

On October 7, 2015 Cheap Trick was nominated for induction into the Rock and Roll Hall Of Fame.

On October 22, 2015 Magic Cristian performed with Cheap Trick at the Hard Rock Arena in Hollywood, Florida and then at the Capitol Theater in Clearwater, Florida on October the 23rd.

On October 24, 2015 they performed for over 13,000 people in Orlando, Florida.

On December 17, 2015, it was announced that Cheap Trick would be inducted into the Rock and Roll Hall Of Fame. On April 8, 2016, Cheap Trick along with Deep Purple, Steve Miller, Chicago and N.W.A were inducted into the Rock and Roll Hall Of Fame.

On September 23, 2016, Cheap Trick invited Magic Cristian to perform background vocals with them at the Perfect Vodka Amphitheater in West Palm Beach Fl. Also on the bill were Joan Jett and headliners Heart. 17,000 fans attended.

On August 1, 2017, Cheap Trick invited Magic Cristian to perform background vocals with them at the Coral Sky Amphitheater in West Palm Beach, Fl. Also on the bill were Jason Bonham (opening act) and headliners Foreigner.

In 2018, Cristian continues as co-owner of the production company and performs in performing arts theaters and local venues around South Florida.

On October 23, 2020, an internet podcast show called "Cheap Talk with Trick Chat" posted an interview featuring Phil "Magic" Cristian recorded earlier in the year.

== Discography ==
- The Flamingo Orkestra featuring Cynthia Manley (1987) - songwriter, keyboards.
- No Prisoner (1988) - singer, songwriter, keyboards.
- Hands Of Time (1994, released 1997) - songwriter, keyboards with Big Mouth.

=== With Cheap Trick ===
- Live At Alpine Valley (King Biscuit Radio Broadcast 1982) - keyboards, background vocals.
- Live In Germany (Rockpalast Concert 1983) - keyboards, background vocals
- Up The Creek Soundtrack (1983) - keyboards, background vocals.
- Standing On The Edge (1985) - keyboards on the track Love Comes

== Keyboard rig on Cheap Trick tour ==
- Korg M3 (61 key) - Korg M3 (73 key)], Korg Krome (61 key), Korg M50 (73 key).
