= Superwoman (Karyn White song) =

1989 single by Karyn White

Single by Karyn White

from the album Karyn White
- B-side: "Language of Love"
- Released: January 2, 1989
- Recorded: March–April 1988
- Genre: R&B
- Length: 5:49 (album version); 4:30 (edited version)
- Label: Warner Bros.
- Songwriters: L.A. Reid; Babyface; Daryl Simmons
- Producers: L.A. Reid; Babyface; Daryl Simmons

Karyn White singles chronology
"The Way You Love Me" (1988)	"Superwoman" (1989)	"Love Saw It" (1989)

"Superwoman" is a song by R&B singer Karyn White, released as the second single from her self-titled debut album in January 1989. It was her second U.S. top ten hit, peaking at number eight, and her second U.S. R&B number-one hit, holding that position for three weeks. It also earned a gold certification from the Recording Industry Association of America (RIAA).

== Music video ==
The music video, directed by Bruce Logan, was filmed in Los Angeles, California in late 1988.

== Track listing ==
7" vinyl single (UK)

1. "Superwoman (Edit)" – 4:30
2. "The Way You Love Me (Edit)" – 3:45

12" vinyl single (UK)

1. "Superwoman (Long Version)"
2. "Superwoman (7" Version)" – 4:30
3. "The Way You Love Me (New York Groove Edit)"

== Charts ==
=== Weekly charts ===
Karyn White version
Chart (1988–89)	Peak position
Australia (ARIA)	162
Canada Top Singles (RPM)	16
UK Singles (Official Charts)	11
US Billboard Hot 100	8
US Hot Black Singles (Billboard)	1
US Adult Contemporary (Billboard)	12
US Radio & Records CHR/Pop Airplay Chart	9

=== Year-end charts ===
Chart (1989)	Position
UK Singles (OCC)	98
US Hot Black Singles (Billboard)	1

== Certifications ==
Region	Certification	Certified units/sales
United States (RIAA)	Gold	500,000^{^}
^{^} Shipments figures based on certification alone.

== Gladys Knight version ==
"Superwoman"

Single by Gladys Knight featuring Dionne Warwick and Patti LaBelle

from the album Good Woman
- B-side: "License to Kill"
- Released: 1991
- Recorded: 1991
- Genre: Soul
- Label: MCA Records; MCT17841
- Songwriters: L.A. Reid; Babyface; Daryl Simmons
- Producer: Michael J. Powell

Gladys Knight singles chronology
"Men" (1991)	"Superwoman" (1991)	"Meet Me in the Middle" (1991)

In 1991, a version by Gladys Knight featuring Dionne Warwick and Patti LaBelle was featured on Knight's Good Woman album and released as a single. It reached No. 19 on the Billboard Hot R&B Singles chart.

=== Charts ===
Gladys Knight, Dionne Warwick and Patti LaBelle version
Chart (1991)	Peak position
US Hot R&B Songs (Billboard)	19
