= Carpe Diem (Karyn White album) =

Studio album by Karyn White
- Released: March 24, 2012
- Recorded: 2011
- Genre: R&B
- Length: 40:31
- Label: KW; Lightyear; EMI
- Producer: Derek "D.O.A." Allen

Karyn White chronology
Make Him Do Right (1994)	Carpe Diem (2012)

Professional ratings
Review scores
Source	Rating
AllMusic	link

Carpe Diem is Karyn White's fourth album, released in 2012, and is the first album she has released in nearly twenty years. Notable songs on the album include the lead single, "Sista Sista", and a cover of Cyndi Lauper's hit song "True Colors".

== Track listing ==
No.	Title	Writer(s)	Length
1.	"Sista Sista"	Derek "D.O.A." Allen, Kymberli Armstrong, Karyn White, Juanita Wynn	3:53
2.	"Dance Floor"	Allen, J-Ali, Jay King, White	4:06
3.	"This Hot"	Allen, J-Ali, Eligha "Eknok" Jones, Jeremy "J-Syl" Sylvers, White	3:23
4.	"Sooo Weak"	Allen, Bobby G., J-Ali, White	3:52
5.	"Unbreakable"	Branden "B-Lew" Lewis, Sheven Morris, White	4:52
6.	"Interlude (Costine & Lee)"	Allen	1:04
7.	"My Heart Cries"	Bobby G.	4:28
8.	"True Colors"	Tom Kelly, Billy Steinberg	3:13
9.	"Carpe Diem (Seize The Day)"	Allen, Bobby G., Jerry White, White	3:49
10.	"Heaven"	Allen, Bobby G., Maryann Mason, Vanetta Thompson, White	3:31
11.	"Sista Sista (Acoustic)"	Allen, Armstrong, White, Wynn	4:20
Total length:			40:31
