= Art Porter Sr. =

American jazz musician

Art Porter Sr. (8 February 1934 – 22 July 1993) was an American jazz pianist from Little Rock, Arkansas. During his musical career, he performed with the Art Porter Trio, founded in 1962, and the Art Porter Singers, founded in 1976. Although primarily playing locally, Porter played FESTAC 77, the World Black and African Festival of Arts and Culture held in Nigeria in 1977, and with saxophonist son Art Porter Jr. did a European tour in 1991 that included festivals in Belgium, Germany, and the Netherlands.

Porter was also known as an educator. An alum of AM&N College (1954, BA in Music Education) and Henderson State University (1975, MS in Music Education), Porter taught at various high schools and colleges, including Parkview High School in Little Rock, Mississippi Valley College and Philander Smith College. He produced several education television shows, including The Minor Key and Porterhouse Cuts (the latter of which was broadcast throughout 14 states in the US southeast). He was an acquaintance of former Arkansas governor (and president of the United States) Bill Clinton, who sometimes played with Porter on saxophone.

In 1993, Porter received the inaugural Lifetime Achievement Award from the Arkansas Jazz and Heritage Foundation.

== Select discography ==
- Little Rock A.M.
- Something Else
- Portrait of Art
