= Ritual of Love =

Studio album by Karyn White
- Released: September 10, 1991
- Recorded: 1990–1991
- Studios: Flyte Tyme Studios, M'Bila Studios, Studio 415
- Genres: R&B; new jack swing
- Length: 58:31
- Label: Warner Bros.
- Producers: Christopher Troy & Zachary Harmon (tracks 3 and 10); Jimmy Jam and Terry Lewis (tracks 1, 2 4–6, 8 and 12; also executive producers); Michael J. Powell (track 9); Laney Stewart (tracks 7 and 10); Karyn White (tracks 1–8 and 10–12; also executive producer)

Karyn White chronology
Karyn White (1988)	Ritual of Love (1991)	Make Him Do Right (1994)

Singles from Ritual of Love
- 1. "Romantic" Released: August 23, 1991; 2. "The Way I Feel About You" Released: November 7, 1991; 3. "Walkin' the Dog" Released: February 27, 1992; 4. "Do Unto Me" Released: June 25, 1992

Professional ratings
Review scores
Source	Rating
AllMusic	4.5/5 stars
Calgary Herald	B
Entertainment Weekly	B−
The Rolling Stone Album Guide	2.5/5 stars

Ritual of Love is the second album by the American singer Karyn White, released on September 10, 1991. It contains her biggest hit, "Romantic", as well as her R&B hit, "The Way I Feel About You".

== Track listing ==
All tracks are written by Jimmy Jam, Terry Lewis, and Karyn White, except where noted.

No.	Title	Writer(s)	Length
1.	"Romantic"		4:07
2.	"Ritual of Love"		4:36
3.	"The Way I Feel About You"	Zachary Harmon, Bruce Sterling, Christopher Troy, White	4:35
4.	"Hooked on You"	Jam, Lewis	4:56
5.	"Walkin' the Dog"	Tony Haynes, Lewis, Laney Stewart, White	3:58
6.	"Love That's Mine"		4:54
7.	"How I Want You"	Haynes, Stewart, White	4:57
8.	"One Heart"	Jam, Lewis	4:52
9.	"Tears of Joy"	Vernon D. Fails, Jam, Lewis, Michael J. Powell, White	5:05
10.	"Beside You"	Haynes, Gary Hines, White	4:59
11.	"Do Unto Me"	Harmon, Haynes, Troy, White	5:25
12.	"Hard to Say Goodbye"	Haynes, Jam, Lewis, Lawrence Waddell, White	5:25
Total length:			58:31

== Production ==
- Produced by Christopher Troy & Zachary Harmon, Jimmy Jam & Terry Lewis, Michael J. Powell, Laney Stewart & Karyn White
- Executive producers: Jimmy Jam, Benny Medina, Karyn White
- Engineers: Mike Girgis, Steve Hodge, Michael Iacopelli, Terry Lewis, Al Richardson, David Rideau, Eric Sproul, Laney Stewart, David Ward II
- Assistant engineer: Milton Chan
- Mixing: Milton Chan, Steve Hodge, Barney Perkins, Michael J. Powell

== Personnel ==
- Drums, percussion: Trenon Graham, Michael J. Powell, Stokley, David Ward II
- Drum programming: Laney Stewart, Stokley
- Bass: Edgar "Boney E." Hinton, Terry Lewis
- Synthesized bass: Bruce Sterling, Christopher Troy
- Keyboards, synthesizers: Lance Alexander (also sampling), Vernon D. Fails, Gary Hines, Jimmy Jam, Keri Lewis, Bruce Sterling, Laney Stewart, Christopher Troy, Lawrence Waddell, David Ward II
- Guitars: Richard Davis, Michael J. Powell
- Saxophone: Ken Holmen
- Backing vocals: Lance Alexander, Jearlyn Steele Battle, Joey Elias, Lisa Keith, Prof. T., Andre Shepard, Darron Story

== Charts ==
=== Weekly charts ===
Chart (1991)	Peak position
Australian Albums (ARIA)	152
Dutch Albums (Album Top 100)	62
US Billboard 200	53
US Top R&B/Hip-Hop Albums (Billboard)	7

=== Year-end charts ===
Chart (1991)	Position
US Top R&B/Hip-Hop Albums (Billboard)	98
Chart (1992)	Position
US Top R&B/Hip-Hop Albums (Billboard)	48

== Certifications ==
Region	Certification	Certified units/sales
Japan (RIAJ)	Gold	100,000^{^}
United States (RIAA)	Gold	500,000^{^}
^{^} Shipments figures based on certification alone.
