= The Way You Love Me (Karyn White song) =

Single by Karyn White

from the album Karyn White
- B-side: "Love on the Line"
- Released: August 15, 1988
- Recorded: 1988
- Genre: New jack swing
- Length: 4:56 (album version); 3:45 (edited version)
- Label: Warner Bros.
- Songwriters: Kenneth Edmonds; Antonio Reid; Daryl Simmons
- Producers: L.A. Reid; Babyface

Karyn White singles chronology
| "True Confessions" (1987) | "The Way You Love Me" (1988) | "Superwoman" (1989) |

"The Way You Love Me" is the lead single from American singer Karyn White's 1988 self-titled debut studio album. Written and produced by Kenneth "Babyface" Edmonds, Antonio "L.A." Reid and Daryl Simmons, this song was the first of White's four top-ten hits on the Billboard Hot 100. "The Way You Love Me" was certified Gold by the Recording Industry Association of America (RIAA) on March 9, 1989.

== Music video ==
The accompanying music video for "The Way You Love Me" was shot in Los Angeles in July 1988.

== Track listing and formats ==
7-inch vinyl single (USA, Germany)

1. The Way You Love Me (Edit) – 3:45
2. Love on the Line – 4:05

12-inch vinyl single (UK)

1. The Way You Love Me (12" Club Mix) – 6:40
2. The Way You Love Me (12" Hype Remix) – 7:27
3. Love on the Line – 4:05

12-inch vinyl single (UK)
Mini CD (Germany)

1. The Way You Love Me (Paul Simpson Remix) – 6:50
2. The Way You Love Me (Simp-House Dub) – 5:08
3. The Way You Love Me (Paul Simpson 7" Remix) – 4:34

12-inch vinyl single (USA, Germany)

1. "The Way You Love Me" (12" Hype Remix) – 7:27
2. "The Way You Love Me" (Love Dub #1) – 5:25
3. "The Way You Love Me" (Love Dub #2) – 3:48
4. "The Way You Love Me" (12" Hype Remix Edit) – 3:41
5. "The Way You Love Me" (12" Club Mix) – 6:40
6. "The Way You Love Me" (Instrumental) – 5:20

== Chart performance ==
The single peaked at number seven on the US Billboard Hot 100, number one on the Dance/Electronic Singles Sales chart, and at number five on the Dance Club Songs chart. It also reached number 42 on the UK Singles Chart.

== Charts ==
=== Weekly charts ===
| Chart (1988–1989) | Peak position |
|---|---|
| Netherlands (Dutch Top 40 Tipparade) | 3 |
| UK Singles (Official Charts Company) | 42 |
| US Billboard Hot 100 | 7 |
| US Dance Club Songs (Billboard) | 5 |
| US Dance/Electronic Singles Sales (Billboard) | 1 |

=== Year-end charts ===
| Chart (1989) | Position |
|---|---|
| United States (Billboard) | 64 |

== Certifications ==
| Region | Certification | Certified units/sales |
|---|---|---|
| United States (RIAA) | Gold | 500,000^{^} |
^{^} Shipments figures based on certification alone.
