= Karyn White (album) =

Studio album by Karyn White
- Released: September 6, 1988
- Recorded: 1987–1988
- Genre: R&B
- Length: 44:35
- Label: Warner Bros.
- Producers: Babyface; L.A. Reid; Jeff Lorber; Karyn White; Ian Prince; Steve Harvey

Karyn White chronology
Karyn White (1988)	Ritual of Love (1991)

Singles from Karyn White
- 1. "The Way You Love Me" Released: August 15, 1988; 2. "Superwoman" Released: January 2, 1989; 3. "Love Saw It" Released: February 27, 1989; 4. "Secret Rendezvous" Released: May 14, 1989; 5. "Slow Down" Released: August 31, 1989

Professional ratings
Review scores
Source	Rating
AllMusic	4.5/5 stars

Karyn White is the debut album by American singer Karyn White. The album was released on September 6, 1988, by Warner Bros., and went to No. 1 on the Billboard Top R&B/Hip-Hop Albums chart for seven weeks the following year. The album was certified Platinum by the RIAA on April 4, 1989. It gave her four hits, "The Way You Love Me", "Superwoman", "Love Saw It" and "Secret Rendezvous". The former three were No. 1 singles on the Hot R&B/Hip-Hop Songs chart and all except "Love Saw It" were Top-10 successes on the Billboard Hot 100 ("Love Saw It" never appeared on the pop chart). A re-issue in late 1989 of "Secret Rendezvous" in the UK reached No. 22, as opposed to the original top 50 placing. "Superwoman" became her biggest hit there, reaching No. 11 on the UK Singles Chart.

White co-wrote two songs on the album.

== Track listing ==
All tracks are written by Babyface, L.A. Reid and Daryl Simmons except where noted.

No.	Title	Writer(s)	Producer(s)	Length
1.	"The Way You Love Me"		Babyface, Reid	4:56
2.	"Secret Rendezvous"		Babyface, Reid	5:38
3.	"Slow Down"	Steve Harvey, Simmons, White	Harvey	4:35
4.	"Superwoman"		Babyface, Reid	5:49
5.	"Family Man"		Babyface, Reid	4:07
6.	"Love Saw It" (featuring Babyface)		Babyface, Reid	5:21
7.	"Don't Mess with Me"		Babyface, Reid	4:53
8.	"Tell Me Tomorrow"	Evan Rogers, Arnie Roman, White	Jeff Lorber, White	4:54
9.	"One Wish"	Ian Prince, Jimmy Scott	Lorber, Prince	4:22
Total length:				44:35

== Personnel ==
- Karyn White – lead and backing vocals
- Babyface – acoustic and electric guitars, keyboards, backing and duet vocals
- O'Bryan Burnette, Carmen Carter, Shaun Earl, Kim Eurisa, Niki Haris, Bunny Hull, Debra Hurd, Sharon Robinson, Evan Rogers – backing vocals
- Steve Harvey, Jeff Lorber, Ian Prince – keyboards, programming
- Donald Griffin, Dann Huff – guitars
- Kayo – synthesized and electric bass, synth guitar
- Gary Meek – sax
- Daryl Simmons – drums, percussion, timbales

== Charts ==
=== Weekly charts ===
Chart performance for Karyn White
Chart (1988–1989)	Peak position
Australian Albums (ARIA)	130
Canada Top Albums/CDs (RPM)	20
Dutch Albums (Album Top 100)	79
European Albums (Music & Media)	84
UK Albums (Official Charts)	20
US Billboard 200	19
US Top R&B/Hip-Hop Albums (Billboard)	1

=== Year-end charts ===
Year-end chart performance for Karyn White
Chart (1989)	Position
Canada Top Albums/CDs (RPM)	80
UK Albums (OCC)	95
US Billboard 200	30
US Top R&B/Hip-Hop Albums (Billboard)	4

== Certifications ==
Certifications and sales for Karyn White
Region	Certification	Certified units/sales
United Kingdom (BPI)	Gold	100,000^{^}
United States (RIAA)	Platinum	1,000,000^{^}
^{^} Shipments figures based on certification alone.

== See also ==
- List of Billboard number-one R&B albums of 1989
