= Art Porter Jr. =

American jazz saxophonist

Art Porter
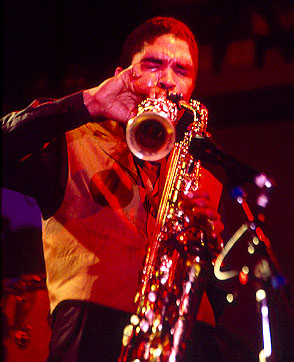
- Porter during a live event

Background information
- Birth name: Arthur Lee Porter Jr.
- Born: August 3, 1961; Little Rock, Arkansas, U.S.
- Died: November 23, 1996 (aged 35); Sai Yok, Thailand
- Genres: Smooth jazz
- Occupation(s): Musician, songwriter
- Instrument: Saxophone
- Years active: 1970–1996
- Labels: Verve Forecast, PolyGram

Arthur Lee Porter Jr. (August 3, 1961 – November 23, 1996) was an American jazz saxophonist. He was the son of jazz musician Art Porter Sr. and the namesake of "The Art Porter Bill".

== Early life ==
Art Porter Jr. was born in Little Rock, Arkansas in 1961. Porter joined his father's band (The Art Porter Trio) as a drummer at the age of 9 and played with them into his teen years. Porter was then drawn to the saxophone, after noticing its melodic abilities, and began to play it during shows with his father's group. Porter is a 1979 graduate of Parkview Arts and Science Magnet High School in Little Rock, where he played in the marching and jazz bands. When Porter turned 16, he began to be barred from clubs because he was under 21. It was during this time that he was arrested and charged with working under-age in a nightclub serving alcoholic beverages. Then Arkansas Attorney General, and future President of the United States Bill Clinton, who was also a saxophonist, intervened to get the charges dropped and pushed for the law to be changed to allow under-age musicians to appear in adult facilities as long as their legal guardians accompanied them. This law became known as "The Art Porter Bill".

=== College ===
Porter attended Berklee College of Music and Northeastern Illinois University where he studied music, earning a bachelor's degree in Arts in the latter. He later attended Roosevelt University, where he would earn his master's degree. Porter studied piano under Ellis Marsalis, a former saxophonist himself.

== Career ==
In the mid-1980s, Porter moved to Chicago, Illinois, and studied tenor saxophone with Von Freeman and performed with Pharoah Sanders and Jack McDuff. During the 1990s, he developed an interest in R&B and hip hop and merged elements of these into his performances. Soon after this, Porter signed with Verve Forecast Records and PolyGram and produced several albums, beginning in the summer of 1992 with Pocket City, followed by Straight to the Point, Undercover, and finally Lay Your Hands on Me. Porter and his father performed for President Clinton during his 1993 inauguration, playing Amazing Grace at a prayer breakfast.

== Death ==
In 1996, Porter traveled to Thailand to appear at the Thailand International Jazz Festival. After the festival on November 23, he went boating on the Kratha Taek reservoir in Sai Yok. The boat Porter was traveling on started to sink, and Porter, along with several others, drowned. Porter was survived by his wife and two elementary-aged sons. In 1998, the album For Art's Sake was posthumously released in his honor. It is a compilation album composed of songs from Porter's previous albums, as well as two previously unreleased songs. It also features one song by Jeff Lorber dedicated to Porter.

== Awards and honors ==
Porter was inducted into the Arkansas Jazz Hall of Fame and the Arkansas Entertainers Hall of Fame. He received the Arkansas Jazz Hall of Fame Lifetime Achievement Award in 1998.

== Discography ==
- Pocket City (1992)
- Straight to the Point (1993)
- Undercover (1994)
- Lay Your Hands on Me (1996)
- For Art's Sake (1998)
