= Ellis Ashbrook =

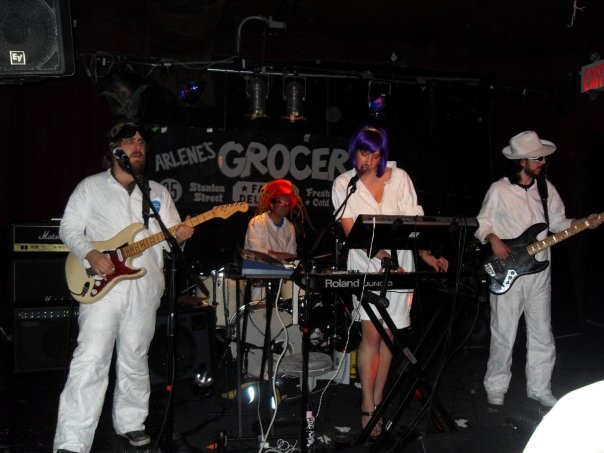
- Ellis Ashbrook performing at Arlene's Grocery on Halloween 2009

Background information
- Origin: Boston, Massachusetts
- Genres: Experimental, psychedelic, rock
- Years active: 2004–present
- Members: John Barber, Alex Major, Jonathan Granoff, Dan Keller
- Past members: Natalie Lowe, Ryan Gildea, Christopher Hammond, Joseph Lemerise

Ellis Ashbrook is an American contemporary experimental rock group from Brooklyn, New York, United States. The band consists of John Barber (lead guitar, vocals), Alex Major (drum kit), Jonathan Granoff (bass guitar), and Dan Keller (rhythm guitar, keyboards, vocals). Barber and Granoff are both graduates of the Berklee School of Music and Major is a graduate of Boston University.

== History ==
The band was formed in East Greenwich, Rhode Island by John Barber, Alex Major, and Ryan Gildea while attending East Greenwich High School. Though the band has evolved throughout the years, Barber and Major began collaborating musically at the age of ten. Granoff joined the group in 2003 and the group played rock clubs around Providence, Rhode Island (including The Living Room, The Met Cafe, and The Century Lounge) and Boston (including All Asia Cafe and The Middle East). In 2003, the band released an EP entitled Seven Exits.

In April, 2006 the band released their debut, self-titled album while living in Boston, Massachusetts. Shortly after the release of Ellis Ashbrook, Natalie Lowe joined the group, contributing keyboards and providing vocals. The group played their first show with Lowe at The Middle East Downstairs in Cambridge, MA. The group's live shows received praise from Boston's rock community. A.J. Wachtel of The Noise describes the group's shows as "a big sound for such a relatively small group. The tunes are driven by the unpredictability of where the music is heading. The bottom line is they get the feet moving and then get the head thinking.”

Assemblage, Ellis Ashbrook's second album, was released in October 2008. Although he contributed heavily to the album, Gildea left the group prior to Assemblage's release. Gildea is currently a member of the Boston-based band Left Hand Does. The release of Assemblage saw Ellis Ashbrook gain a loyal following in New York and cemented their place on Brooklyn's rock scene. David Day of Weekly Dig praises the group as "the complete package, they also had a hand in engineering and mixing their second CD, Assemblage. It's a hell-fueled, spiraling rock record."

Since the release of Assemblage, the group has maintained a regular touring schedule and continues to have a strong presence in the New York, Boston, and Providence rock scenes. Time Out New York suggests that "local outfit Ellis Ashbrook offers intriguing sounding alt-rock that draws on prog, grunge, and funk-metal in equal measures."

In March 2011, Ellis Ashbrook released a live DVD from their July 3, 2010 show at The Highline Ballroom in New York City. Ellis Ashbrook released their third full-length studio album Meridia in May 2011. Their fourth and most recent LP, The Space Palace was released in 2017.

== Discography ==
=== Studio albums ===
- Ellis Ashbrook (2006)
- Assemblage (2008)
- Meridia (2011)
- The Space Palace (2017)

=== Extended plays ===
- Seven Exits (2003)
