= Karyn White =

American singer-songwriter from California

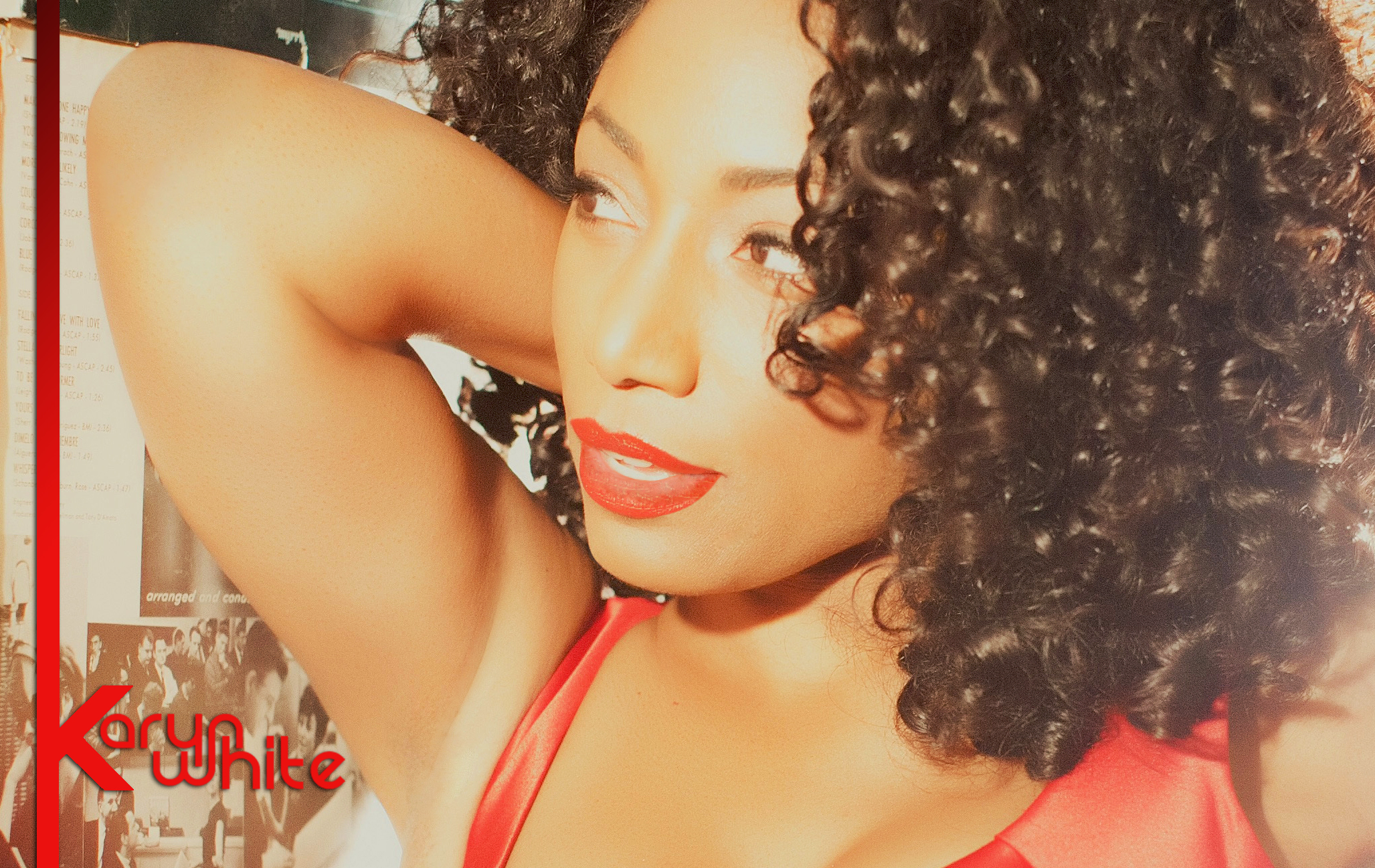
- White in 2011

Background information
- Born: Karyn Layvonne White; October 14, 1965 (age 61); Los Angeles, California, U.S.
- Genres: R&B; soul; new jack swing
- Occupations: Singer; songwriter
- Years active: 1984–1995; 2012–present
- Labels: Lightyear; EMI; Warner Bros.
- Spouses: Terry Lewis (m. 1992; div. 1999); Bobby G (m. 2007; div. 2009)
- Partner: Al B. Sure! (2012–present)
- Children: 2

Karyn Layvonne White (born October 14, 1965) is an American singer who was popular during the late 1980s and early 1990s. She is known for several hit singles including "Superwoman" (1988), "Secret Rendezvous" (1989), "The Way You Love Me" (1988), and the U.S. Hot 100 No. 1 single "Romantic" (1991).

== Early life ==
White was born in Los Angeles to Vivian and Clarence White. She is the youngest of five children. She sang in a church choir and worked as a backing singer, then sang on Jeff Lorber's 1986 Private Passion singles "Facts of Love", "True Confessions", and "Back in Love" before signing to Warner Bros. Records.

== Career ==
White's self-titled debut album Karyn White was released in 1988. It was produced by L.A. Reid and Babyface and achieved platinum status in the U.S.. The album contained the Hot 100 hit singles "The Way You Love Me", "Secret Rendezvous", and "Superwoman" as well as the No. 1 R&B hit "Love Saw It", a duet with Babyface. White was nominated in the Best R&B/Urban Contemporary New Artist category for the 1989 Soul Train Music Awards, which was won by Al B. Sure! She also received nominations for two Grammy Awards. She became the first female artist to have the first three solo releases from their debut album hit No. 1 on the R&B charts.

Her follow-up album was Ritual of Love in 1991. It had songs produced by Jimmy Jam and Terry Lewis and featured the hit single "Romantic", which hit number one on the U.S. Billboard Hot 100. Other singles from the album include "The Way I Feel About You" (U.S. No. 12), "Walkin' the Dog", and "Do Unto Me" (the last two did not chart). The photographer and director Matthew Rolston directed the video for the hit single "Romantic". Michael Walls, who was credited as stylist on Ritual of Love, worked with White on the look for the Ritual of Love album sleeve, and three of the music videos released for the album. Walls had the idea for the Chanel-inspired pearls and black dress used on the album cover, the French maid look and multiple wardrobe changes for video of "The Way I Feel About You", and the "Walkin' the Dog" video, which was based on a scene from the film Sweet Charity.

Her next album was Make Him Do Right in 1994. The album did not sell well, although she did chart with the singles "Hungah" and the Babyface-penned "Can I Stay With You", which became her final U.S. R&B Top 10 hit in early 1995. "I'd Rather Be Alone", her last chart single to date, peaked at No. 50 on the same chart later that year. In 1995, White appeared with Mary J. Blige, Monica and others for the single "Freedom (Theme from Panther)" for the soundtrack to the Melvin Van Peebles film of the same name.

White left Warner Bros. Records in 1999, and dropped out of the music public eye for many years to start a family.

In 2006, she recorded a new album, titled Sista Sista; which was slated for release in 2006, but was shelved. Two tracks, "All I Do" and "Disconnected", were later released on the best of compilation album, Superwoman: The Best of Karyn White. She was also slated to appear on the Soul Train Music Awards in 2009 as a tribute to Babyface Edmonds. However, this performance was canceled when Edmonds and Reid withdrew from the Soul Train ceremony, declining the honor. In 2011, she was slated to have shot a pilot for a reality series with R&B singers Shanice and Debelah Morgan.

White released her first album after a seventeen-year break, Carpe Diem, in March 2012. The album featured the singles "Sista, Sista" and "Unbreakable," both of which received music videos.

In 2017, White landed a recurring role on the BET Centric television series Beauty and the Baller as trophy wife Kym Banks. She also returned with new music and her first feature film role, in Gale and the Storm directed by Derrick Muhammad. The soundtrack for the film was released on September 4 and included her latest single "Blind Man Walking". The film made its premiere on October 12, 2017.

She earned a 2017 UB Honors nomination for the Gale and the Storm soundtrack in the "Best Independent R&B Album Release" category.

== Personal life ==
White married Terry Lewis in 1992 and together they had a daughter, Ashley Nicole, and adopted their son Brandon. Lewis brought to the marriage his children Trey and Chloe. The couple eventually divorced in 1999. White was later married to producer/musician Bobby G from 2007–09. She then started a relationship with musician Al B. Sure! in 2012.

White resided in Rocklin, California, a suburb of Sacramento, and ran a successful interior design and real estate business.

== Discography ==
Studio albums

- Karyn White (1988)
- Ritual of Love (1991)
- Make Him Do Right (1994)
- Carpe Diem (2012)

== Awards and nominations ==
Year	Award
1989	American Music Award nomination for Favorite Soul/R&B New Artist
1989	Soul Train Music Award nomination for Best New Artist, Best R&B/Urban Contemporary Single, Female and Best R&B/Urban Contemporary Album, Female
1989	Grammy Award nomination for Best Female R&B Vocal Performance ("The Way You Love Me").
1990	Grammy Award nomination for Best Female R&B Vocal Performance ("Superwoman")
1990	American Music Award nomination for Favorite Soul/R&B Album (Karyn White)
2017	UB Honors nomination for Best Independent R&B Album Release (Gale and the Storm – Soundtrack)

== See also ==
- List of Billboard number-one singles
- List of artists who reached number one in the United States
- List of Billboard number-one dance club songs
- List of artists who reached number one on the U.S. Dance Club Songs chart
