= Super Bowl LII =

2018 National Football League championship game

Philadelphia Eagles (1) (NFC) (13–3)	New England Patriots (1) (AFC) (13–3)
41	33
Head coach: Doug Pederson	Head coach: Bill Belichick
	1	2	3	4	Total
PHI	9	13	7	12	41
NE	3	9	14	7	33
- Date: February 4, 2018
- Stadium: U.S. Bank Stadium; Minneapolis, Minnesota
- MVP: Nick Foles, quarterback
- Favorite: Patriots by 5.5
- Referee: Gene Steratore
- Attendance: 67,612

Ceremonies
- National anthem: Pink
- Coin toss: Hershel W. Williams, representing Medal of Honor recipients
- Halftime show: Justin Timberlake

TV in the United States
- Network: NBC; Universo
- Announcers: Al Michaels (play-by-play); Cris Collinsworth (analyst); Michele Tafoya (sideline reporter); Edgar López (play-by-play- Universo); René Giraldo and Rolando Cantú (analysts- Universo); Verónica Contreras (sidelines- Universo)
- Nielsen ratings: 43.1 (national); 56.2 (Philadelphia); 55.9 (Boston); U.S. viewership: 103.4 million est. avg.
- Market share: 68 (national)
- Cost of 30-second commercial: $5 million

Radio in the United States
- Network: Westwood One; ESPN Deportes Radio
- Announcers: Kevin Harlan (play-by-play); Boomer Esiason and Mike Holmgren (analysts); Ed Werder and Tony Boselli (sideline reporters); Álvaro Martín (play-by-play- ESPN Deportes Radio); Raúl Allegre (analyst- ESPN Deportes Radio); John Sutcliffe (sideline- ESPN Deportes Radio)

Super Bowl LII was an American football game played to determine the champion of the National Football League (NFL) for the 2017 season. As a rematch of Super Bowl XXXIX from 13 years earlier, the game was between the National Football Conference (NFC) champion Philadelphia Eagles and the American Football Conference (AFC) and defending Super Bowl LI champion New England Patriots. The underdog Eagles defeated the Patriots with a score of 41–33 to win their first Super Bowl and their first NFL title since 1960, ending what was the third longest championship drought in the league at the time. As a result of the Eagles’ victory, the NFC East became the first and currently only division where every team has won a Super Bowl. The game was played on February 4, 2018, at U.S. Bank Stadium in Minneapolis, Minnesota. This was the second time that a Super Bowl was played in Minneapolis, the northernmost city to ever host the event, after Super Bowl XXVI at the Metrodome during the 1991 season. It was also the sixth and most recent Super Bowl held in a cold-weather city, although the stadium is indoors. The 2020s decade marked the first time since 1970s of which no cold-weather city hosted the Super Bowl.

New England finished the regular season with an AFC-best 13–3 record, then extended their record Super Bowl appearances to ten, their third in four years, and their eighth under the leadership of head coach Bill Belichick and MVP quarterback Tom Brady. Philadelphia also finished the regular season with an NFC-best 13–3 record but entered the playoffs as underdogs after starting quarterback Carson Wentz suffered a season-ending injury late in the regular season; prior to his injury, Wentz was the media and fan favorite to win MVP after leading his team to an 11–2 start. Backup quarterback Nick Foles was the Eagles' starting quarterback for the rest of the season. With Foles, the Eagles advanced to their third Super Bowl appearance, having previously lost to the Oakland Raiders in Super Bowl XV and to the Patriots in Super Bowl XXXIX.

Several records were set during Super Bowl LII, including most yards gained in any NFL game by both teams combined (1,151) and fewest punts from both teams in a Super Bowl (one); the Patriots also set the record for the fewest punts by a team in a Super Bowl. The game was settled after the Eagles converted a fumble recovery deep within Patriots territory leading to a field goal with 1:05 remaining to extend their lead to eight points, and Brady's Hail Mary pass fell incomplete as time expired. Foles, who completed 28 of 43 pass attempts for 373 yards and three touchdowns with one interception, and also caught a one-yard touchdown pass on a trick play, was named Super Bowl MVP.

The Patriots' loss made them the fifth defending Super Bowl champions to lose the next year's title game, after the 1978 Dallas Cowboys, the 1983 Washington Redskins, the 1997 Green Bay Packers, and the 2014 Seattle Seahawks. They were later joined by the 2020 and 2024 Kansas City Chiefs.

Retrospectively, Super Bowl LII is considered among the greatest ever played, with the Eagles' performance being regarded as highly influential in professional football in the years that followed. Foles' touchdown catch, nicknamed the "Philly Special", is often remembered as one of the greatest play-calls of all time. However, the broadcast's viewership on NBC had the smallest Super Bowl audience since Super Bowl XLIII nine years earlier at 103.4 million viewers, while the halftime show, headlined by Justin Timberlake, was 106.6 million American television viewers, 9% less than the previous year's. Viewership for both would continue to shrink the following year.

== Background ==
=== Host-city selection ===
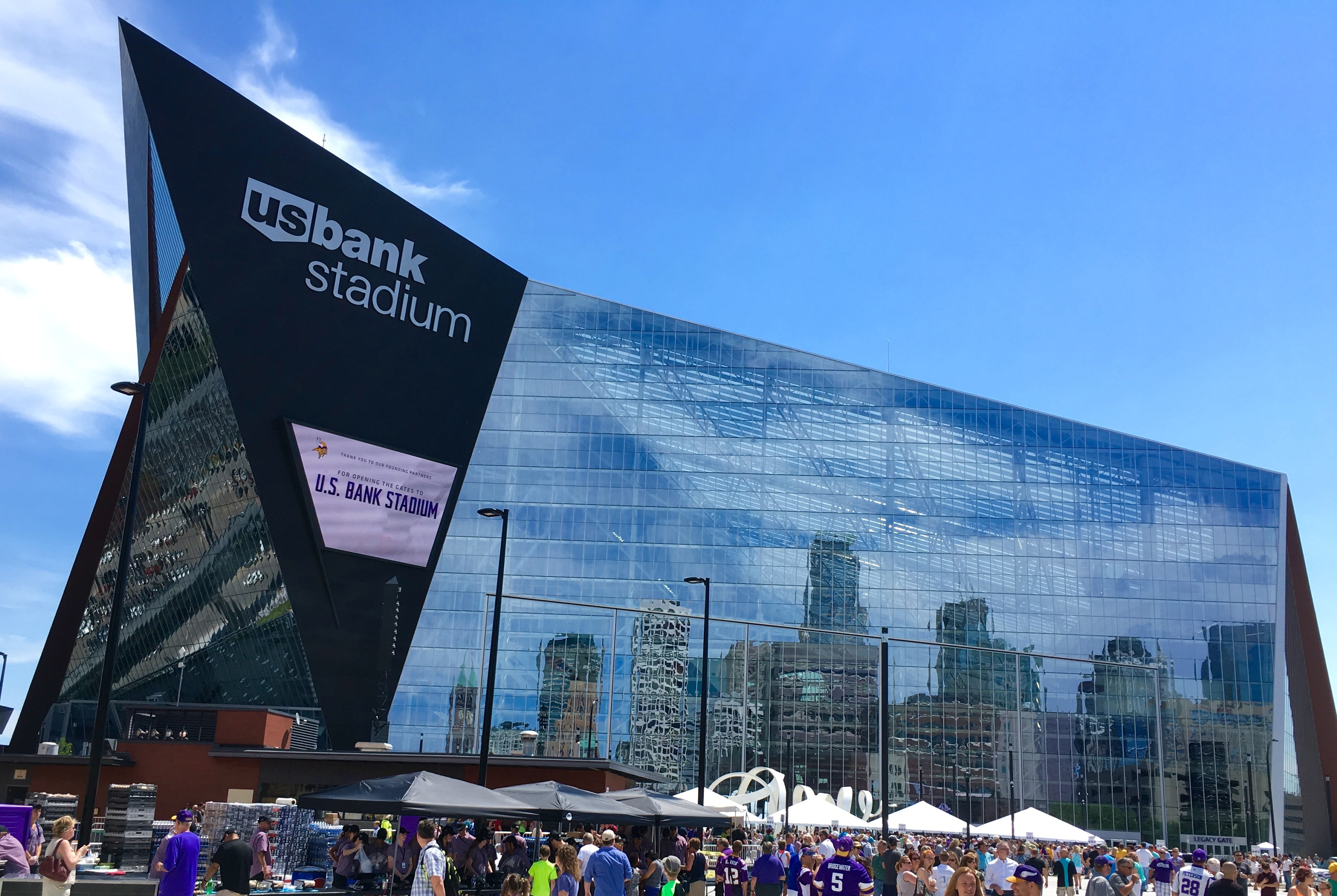
U.S. Bank Stadium in Minneapolis, where Super Bowl LII was held

On October 8, 2013, the league announced that three venues were vying to host Super Bowl LII:

- U.S. Bank Stadium in Minneapolis, Minnesota. Minneapolis hosted Super Bowl XXVI in 1992 at the Hubert H. Humphrey Metrodome, which was demolished after the 2013 season and replaced in 2016 by U.S. Bank Stadium.
- Lucas Oil Stadium in Indianapolis, Indiana. The stadium hosted Super Bowl XLVI in 2012.
- Mercedes-Benz Superdome in New Orleans, Louisiana. The city has hosted 11 Super Bowls, including eight at the Superdome, which would go on to host Super Bowl LIX in 2025.

On May 20, 2014, the league's owners picked Minneapolis at their meeting in Atlanta, Georgia.

=== Associated events ===
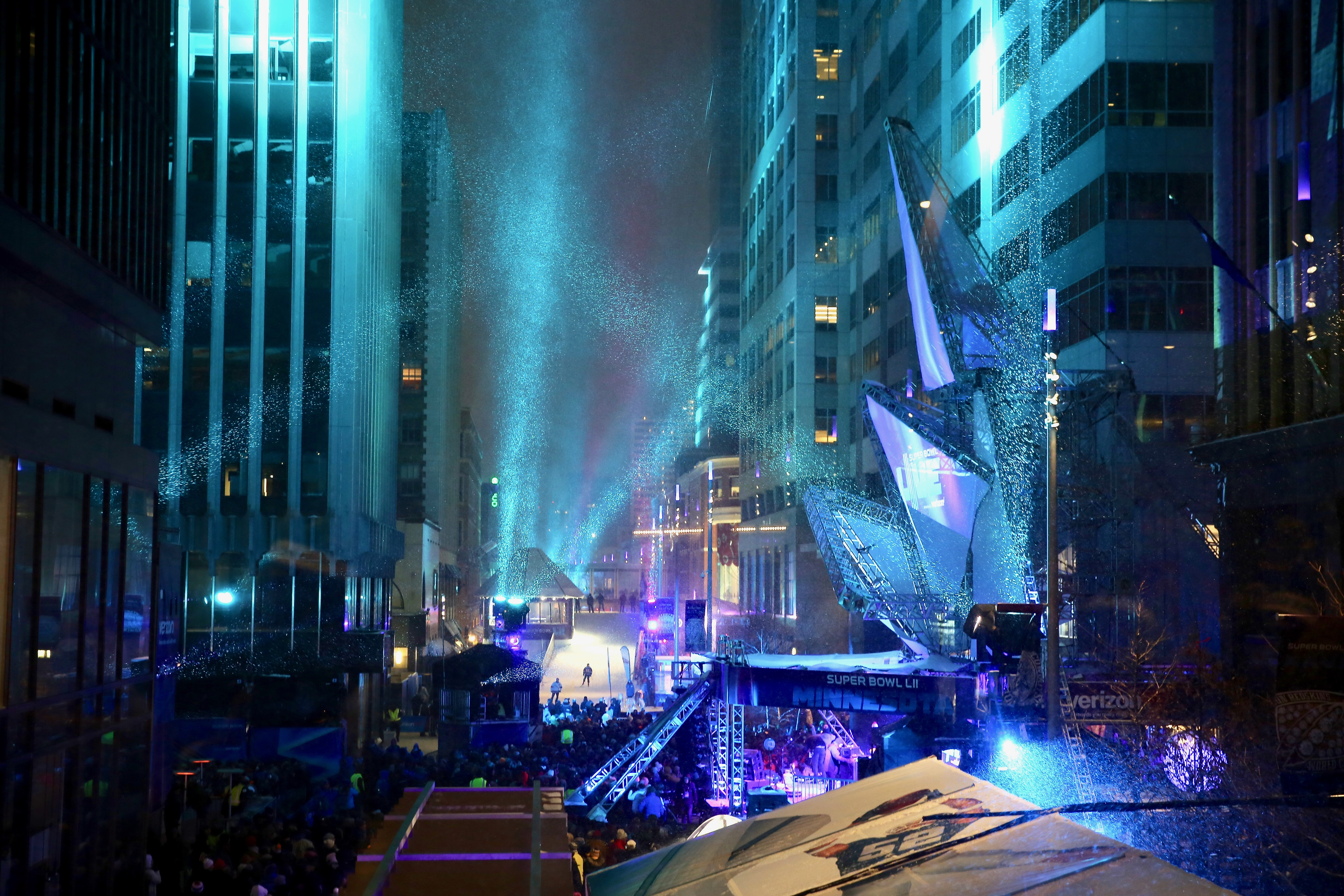
Nicollet Mall hosted the outdoor Super Bowl Live festival during the lead-up to the game.

The Minnesota Super Bowl Host Committee presented Super Bowl Live on Nicollet Mall in downtown Minneapolis. This ten-day free festival and concert series featured Sheila E., The Revolution, Morris Day and The Time, and The New Power Generation, musicians from Minnesota who collaborated with Prince, a Minneapolis native. Produced by Jimmy Jam and Terry Lewis, Super Bowl Live also included performances by Idina Menzel, Soul Asylum, the Suburbs, Bob Mould, Sounds of Blackness, Dessa, VocalEssence, Mint Condition, and the Jets. In addition to the concert series, Super Bowl Live featured a 200-foot (61 m) American Birkebeiner International Bridge on Nicollet Mall to showcase cross-country skiing, skijoring, fat-tire bicycle racing, and snow tubing demonstrations. There was also a snowmobile stunt show on February 3.

The NFL presented the Super Bowl Experience at the Minneapolis Convention Center from January 27 to February 3 with an entrance fee. Kelly Clarkson performed at the Minneapolis Armory and a U.S. Bank Stadium lounge on the day of the Super Bowl.

The Minneapolis Armory also hosted Jennifer Lopez, Imagine Dragons, and Pink concerts close to U.S. Bank Stadium. Pink also performed the national anthem before the Super Bowl. Halftime performer Justin Timberlake held a ticketed "listening session" of his newest album at Prince's Paisley Park. Dave Matthews Band performed at Xcel Energy Center in Saint Paul. The Shakopee Mdewakanton Sioux Community's Mystic Lake Casino hosted Gwen Stefani, the Chainsmokers, Florida Georgia Line, and Kygo. Planners originally scheduled a 64,000-square-foot (5,900 m^{2}) traveling nightclub for 9500 people, but cancelled, moving its concerts into the main casino. Ellie Goulding's appearance with Kygo was cancelled at the same time. The Mystic Lake Casino in Prior Lake, Minnesota, has the second-largest hotel in the Twin Cities metropolitan area, and Prior Lake hosted Super Bowl-week events including winter activities, a hotdish competition, and fundraisers.

Other events were held at the Mall of America (including Radio Row as a home for national shows), Saint Paul's RiverCentre and Xcel Energy Center, the Minnesota Vikings' Winter Park location in Eden Prairie, and the University of Minnesota. "Taste of the NFL" is a fundraiser for food banks and was held in Saint Paul. Minneapolis also offered a temporary zip-line across the Mississippi River near downtown. The Luminary Loppet around Lake of the Isles in Minneapolis featured fire dancing, an ice pyramid, and luminary candles at night.

The 2018 Saint Paul Winter Carnival took place leading up to, during and after the Super Bowl. Carnival organizers built a large ice palace to coincide with the Super Bowl festivities, as with Super Bowl XXVI in 1992. The ice palace was planned, cancelled for lack of funds, then re-announced with sponsors. Events in Saint Paul also included an extreme sports demonstration, a "giant slide", and a block party. Officials in the capital city hoped to attract Minneapolis Super Bowl visitors. The Minneapolis Institute of Art had a free 20-by-40-foot (6.1 m × 12.2 m), 6-foot-tall (1.8 m) ice maze.

The Great Northern was a winter festival in the Twin Cities from January 25 to February 4 that included the U.S. Pond Hockey Championships, an ice bar, and an "urban ski competition".

ESPN broadcast its studio programming from the IDS Center in downtown Minneapolis, while Golf Channel (a sister network of Super Bowl LII broadcaster NBC) aired two live episodes of David Feherty's eponymous interview show from the State Theatre.

Native American communities of Minnesota performed nightly drum ceremonies. Various drumlines from around the state performed at different locations throughout the day.

=== Marketing ===
The slogan Bold North was developed by the Minnesota Super Bowl Host Committee to promote Super Bowl LII and its surrounding festivities. The slogan was intended to represent an embrace of the region's climate as part of its identity, and was used on merchandise and by the host committee's official sponsors. The NFL unveiled the official logo for Super Bowl LII (a cerulean-colored version of a standardized design) prior to Super Bowl LI, and the official branding elements and secondary logo in October 2017—featuring blue and purple aurora motifs.

=== Pre-game Food Rivalry ===
In mid-January 2018, a food rivalry between Philadelphia and Boston emerged. Dottie's Donuts, a local Philadelphia-based donut shop, decided to stop selling Boston Cream donuts until after the Super Bowl as a way to send a message to New England fans. Quinton Johnson, one of the shop's employees, said "We are not doing Boston Cream right now until after the Super Bowl." He added that the shop was getting prank calls from Patriots fans with Boston accents. Charles River Esplanade, a well-known park in Boston, immediately retaliated by banning Philadelphia cream cheese, Philly cheese steaks, soft pretzels, and even Crisco into the park until after the Super Bowl. On Monday, February 5, the respective food bans in both cities were lifted.

== Teams ==
The NFC was represented by the number-one playoff seed Philadelphia Eagles, while the AFC was represented by the number-one playoff seed New England Patriots, marking the fourth time in the previous five years that the Super Bowl had featured the top team from each conference.

=== Philadelphia Eagles ===
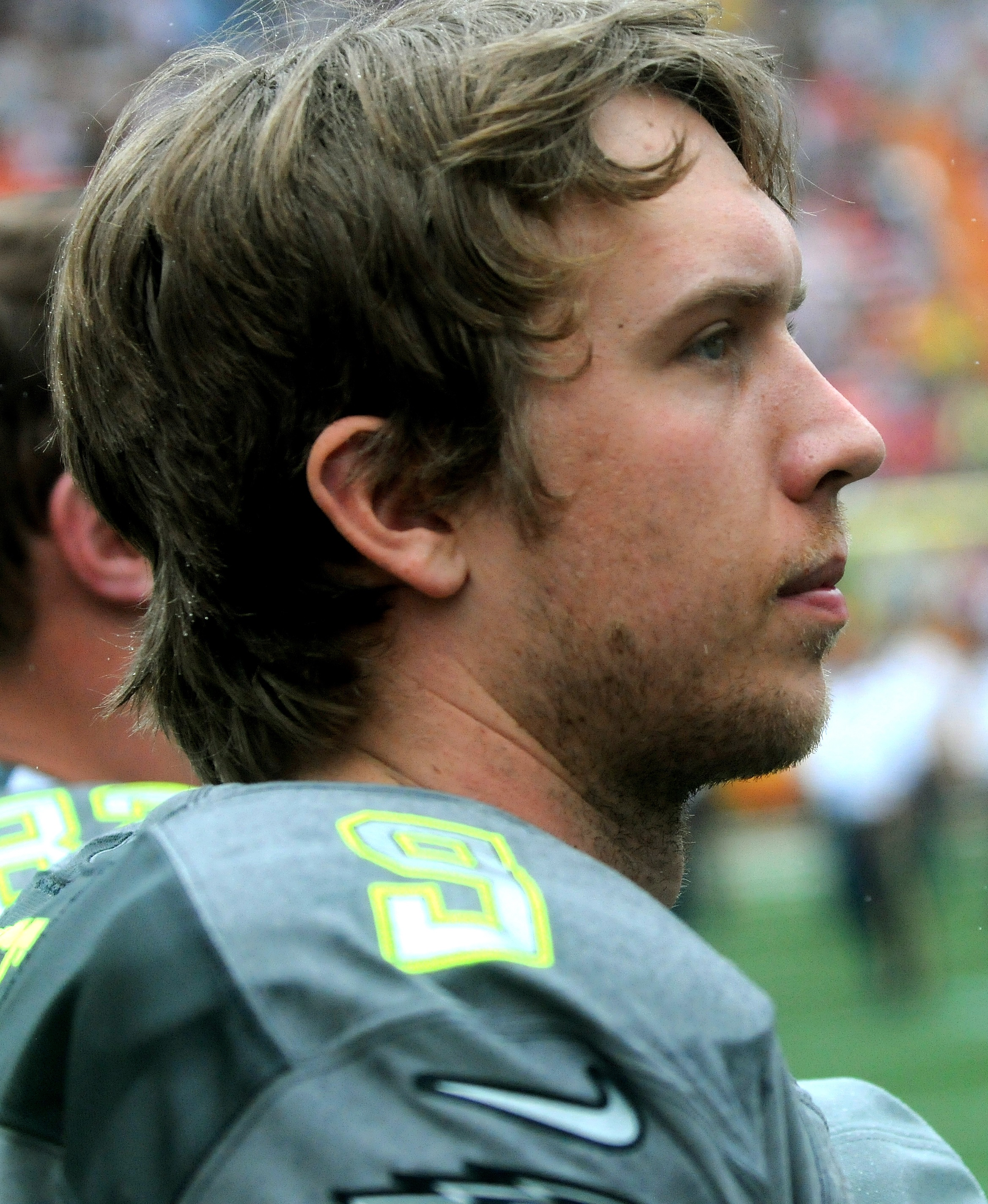
Nick Foles in 2014

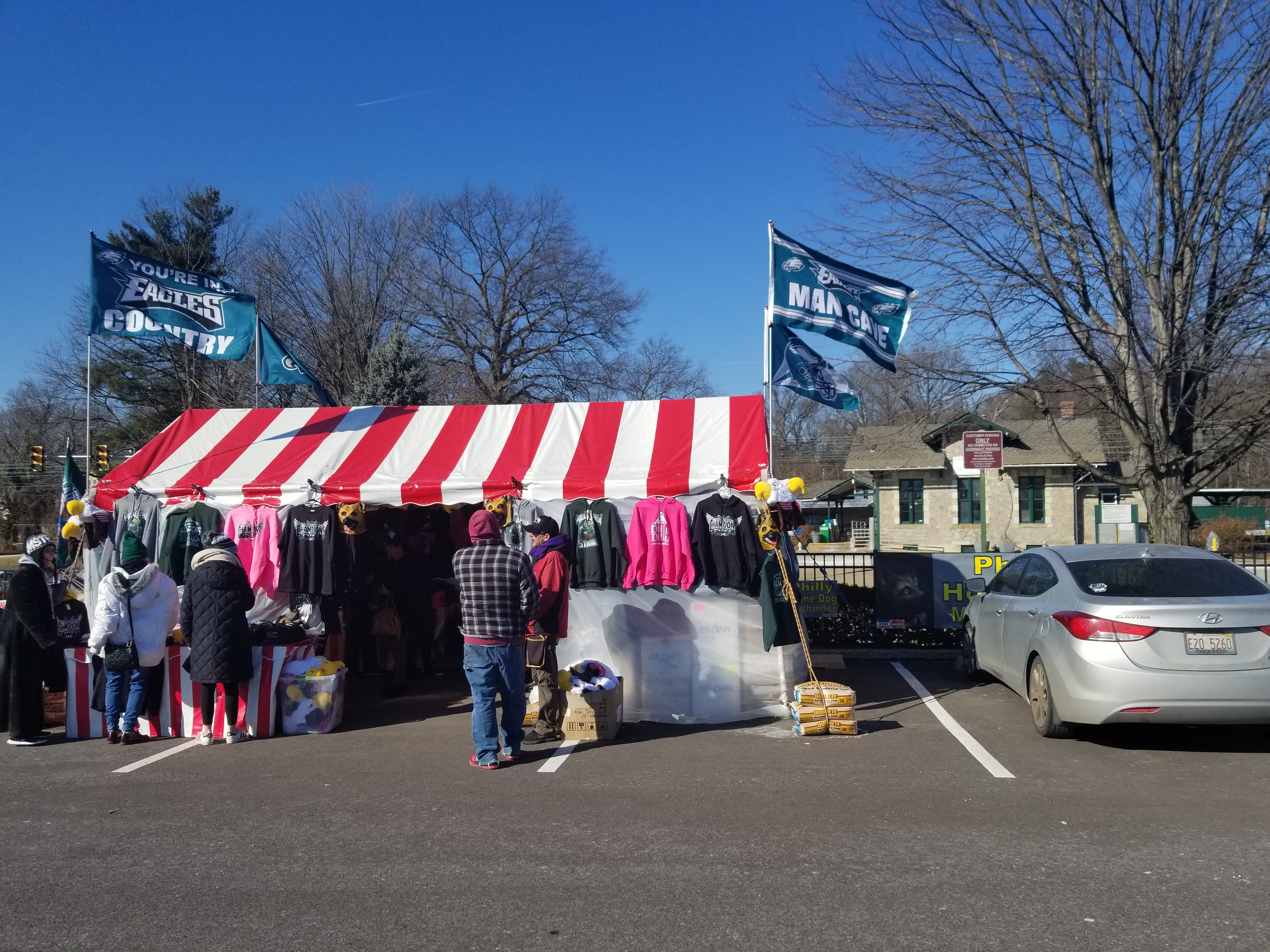
Philadelphia Eagles-related merchandise being sold by a vendor near the Wynnewood station in the Philadelphia suburbs one day prior to the Super Bowl

The Eagles finished the regular season with a record of 13–3, the same as New England, Minnesota, and Pittsburgh, but by virtue of having a better record against common opponents than Minnesota, Philadelphia earned the NFC's top seed in the 2017–18 NFL playoffs. It was a substantial improvement for the team under second-year head coach Doug Pederson; the Eagles finished the previous season with a 7–9 record. In the 2017 season, the team scored 457 points (third in the NFL), while giving up just 295 (fourth) points.

The offense was led by Pro Bowl quarterback Carson Wentz. In just his second season, he recorded a passer rating of 101.9, throwing for 3,296 yards and 33 touchdowns, with only seven interceptions. His top target was Pro Bowl tight end Zach Ertz, who caught 74 passes for 824 yards and eight touchdowns. Other contributors were two receivers acquired from off-season free agency: Alshon Jeffery, who caught 57 passes for 789 yards and nine scores; and Torrey Smith, who had 36 receptions for 430 yards. Meanwhile, third-year receiver Nelson Agholor had the best season of his career, hauling in 62 passes for 768 yards and eight touchdowns, a higher total in each category than in his previous two seasons combined. The Eagles rushing attack also benefited from two recently acquired players, LeGarrette Blount and Jay Ajayi. Blount, an off-season signing who won a Super Bowl with the Patriots, gained 776 rushing yards and two touchdowns, while Ajayi, picked up by a mid-season trade with the Miami Dolphins, rushed for 873 yards and caught 24 passes for 154 yards combined with the two teams. Philadelphia also had a superb offensive line, led by two Pro Bowl selections: Tackle Lane Johnson and Guard Brandon Brooks, along with all pro center Jason Kelce.

The Eagles defense allowed the fourth-fewest yards in the league (4,904). Defensive tackle Fletcher Cox made the Pro Bowl for the third time in his career, recording 5 1/2 sacks and two fumble recoveries, and he had plenty of help around him, such as former Patriots defensive end Chris Long, who had five sacks and forced four fumbles, and defensive end Brandon Graham, who led the team with 9 1/2 sacks. Middle linebacker Nigel Bradham led the team in combined tackles with 88. The Eagles secondary featured Pro Bowl safety Malcolm Jenkins, who had 76 combined tackles and two interceptions, along with cornerback Patrick Robinson, who led the team with four interceptions.

Philadelphia had stormed to the top of the NFC by winning 10 of their first 12 games, but suffered a major setback on December 10, when Wentz went down with a season-ending ACL tear and was replaced by journeyman backup quarterback Nick Foles, who was playing for his third team in as many years and his second stint with the Eagles. After Wentz's injury, many analysts wrote off the remainder of the Eagles' season as they believed they would not recover from his loss. Surprising analysts, Foles was able to lead the team to victory in that game, as well as the next two. The Eagles rested Foles and were led by third-string quarterback Nate Sudfeld for their meaningless game against the Cowboys in Week 17, a game they lost, but in the Eagles' two playoff games, Foles threw for a combined total of 598 yards, three touchdowns and no interceptions, replicating the excellent performance of Wentz to carry the Eagles to the NFC title.

=== New England Patriots ===
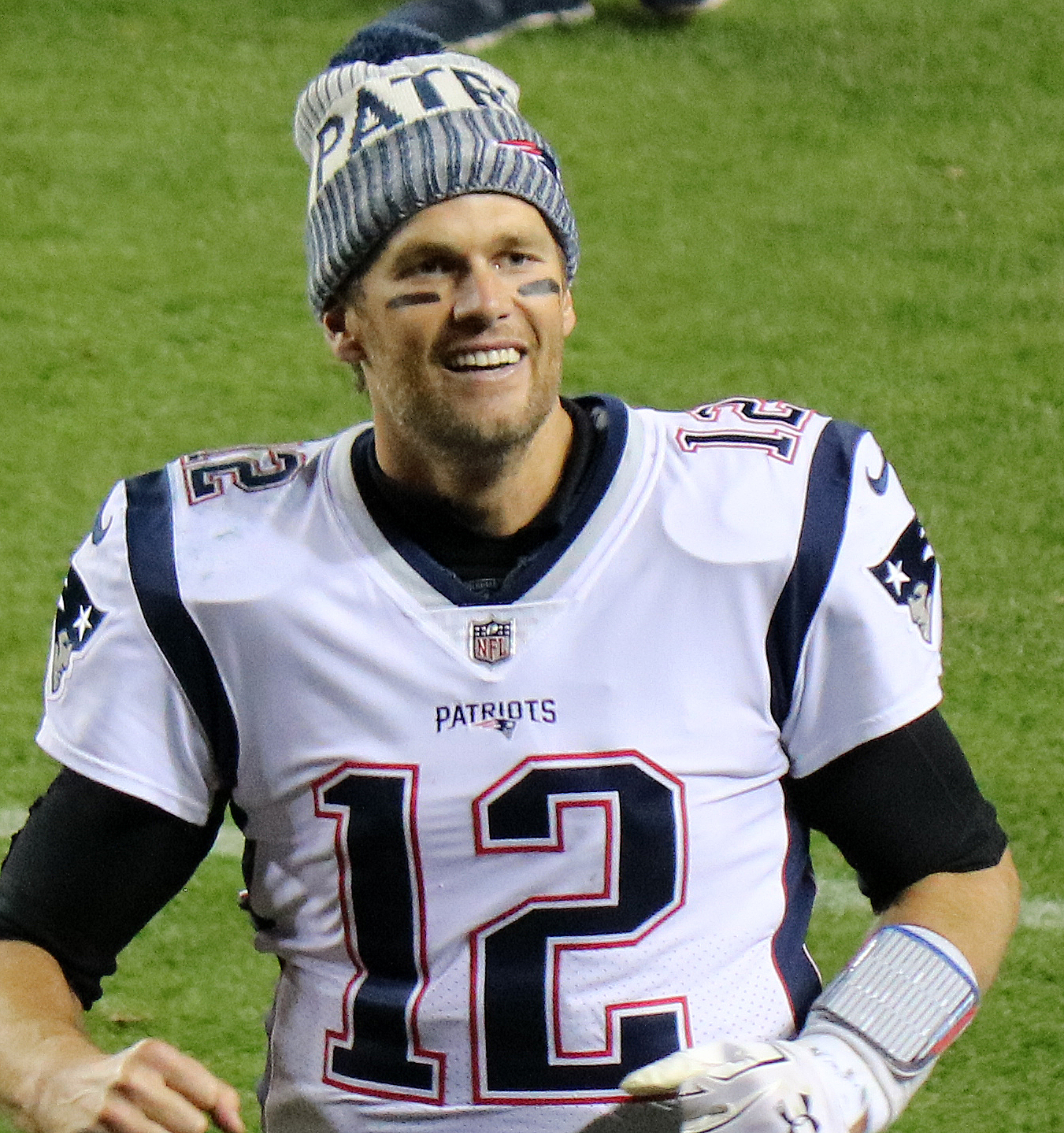
Tom Brady in 2017

The Patriots entered the 2017 NFL season as defending Super Bowl champions. For the 16th time in their 18 seasons under head coach Bill Belichick, they recorded a double-digit win season, finishing the regular season with a record of 13–3 and, by virtue of having a head-to-head victory over Pittsburgh, earned the AFC's number one overall seed. The previous season's top wide receiver Julian Edelman went down in the preseason with a season-ending injury. Early season defensive struggles left the team with a 2–2 record after four weeks, and the worst overall defense in the league at that point. The defense came together as a unit, and tightened up over the rest of the season however, with the Patriots going 11–1 after week 4. Their sole loss in the latter part of the season came in Week 14 to the Miami Dolphins, a division rival, though they were without star tight end Rob Gronkowski due to a one-game suspension for an unnecessary roughness call the prior week. The Patriots' defense was improved by several late-season free-agent signings, including Eric Lee, a defensive end, previously from the Buffalo Bills, whom the Patriots signed in Week 12, and James Harrison, a perennial All-Pro for the Pittsburgh Steelers, whom the Patriots picked up off waivers after Christmas. In just six games for New England, Lee recorded 3 1/2 sacks, a safety, and an interception. In his only regular season game with the Patriots, Harrison recorded two sacks.

During the regular season, New England's offense led the league in yards gained (6,307) and ranked second in points scored (458). The 40-year-old Brady finished his 18th season with a league-leading 4,577 passing yards, 32 touchdowns and just eight interceptions, earning him his 13th selection to the Pro Bowl and his third league MVP award. One change that helped make up for the loss of Edelman was the acquisition of receiver Brandin Cooks, who caught 65 passes for 1,082 yards and seven touchdowns. Brady was also aided by the healthy return of Gronkowski, who had played just eight games in the previous season, finishing this year with 69 catches for 1,084 yards and eight scores. Receiver Danny Amendola added 61 receptions for 659 yards, as well as another 240 yards returning punts. With the loss of their previous season's rushing leader LeGarrette Blount to free agency, Dion Lewis stepped up to take the lead, rushing for 896 yards and six touchdowns despite starting only eight games. He also caught 32 passes for 214 yards and two touchdowns and added 570 yards and another touchdown returning kickoffs. Rex Burkhead chipped in 518 all-purpose yards, 30 receptions, and eight touchdowns. In passing situations, the team relied heavily on running back James White, who caught 56 passes for 429 yards and rushed for 171 on the ground. These backs were aided by the blocking of fullback James Develin, who earned his first Pro Bowl selection. On special teams, kicker Stephen Gostkowski ranked second in the NFL with 156 points and fourth in field goals made with 37, while veteran special team ace Matthew Slater earned his seventh consecutive Pro Bowl selection.

The Patriots' defense ranked only 29th in yards allowed (5,856), but ranked fifth in fewest points, giving up only 296. Defensive end Trey Flowers led the team with 6 1/2 sacks while also forcing two fumbles. Linebacker Kyle Van Noy had 73 tackles and 5 1/2 sacks. The Patriots also had a superb secondary, led by cornerbacks Malcolm Butler (two interceptions, three forced fumbles) and Stephon Gilmore (two interceptions, 47 solo tackles), as well as safeties Devin McCourty (97 combined tackles, one interception, one fumble recovery), Patrick Chung (84 tackles, one interception, two fumble recoveries) and Duron Harmon (four interceptions).

=== Playoffs ===
In the playoffs, the Patriots earned a first-round bye and home-field advantage due to their status as the AFC's first overall seed. In the divisional round, they defeated the Tennessee Titans 35–14, as Brady passed for 337 yards and three touchdowns. In that game, the defense amassed eight quarterback sacks of Marcus Mariota and held the Titans' running game to 65 yards rushing. They defeated the Jacksonville Jaguars 24–20 in the AFC Championship Game, rallying from behind to win the game after the Jaguars jumped out to an early 14–3 lead and whose league-best defense stymied Brady and the rest of the offense for most of the first half. Down 20–10 in the fourth quarter, the Patriots' comeback was sealed by two Brady-led drives, both resulting in touchdown passes to Danny Amendola, as well as a key defensive stop by Stephon Gilmore, whose acrobatic block of a Blake Bortles pass ended Jacksonville's last chance to score. Rob Gronkowski was injured in the game with a concussion, leaving his status for the Super Bowl in doubt. Amendola was the breakout star for the Patriots during their two playoff wins, leading the team with 196 receiving yards, and serving as Brady's primary target.

Philadelphia also earned a first-round bye and home-field advantage as the NFC's first overall seed. They started off the divisional round by narrowly defeating the Atlanta Falcons 15–10, stopping the Falcons on four consecutive plays after the Falcons had a first-down-and-goal situation on the Eagles' 9-yard line during their final drive. They then soundly defeated the Minnesota Vikings 38–7 in the NFC Championship Game. Despite the Vikings scoring on their opening drive, the Eagles' defense held them to three punts, two turnovers on downs, two interceptions, and one lost fumble in their remaining drives of the game. Meanwhile, Foles had a great game, in which he completed 26 of 33 passes for 353 yards and three touchdowns.

=== Pre-game notes ===
This was the fifth meeting between teams from Boston and Philadelphia for a major professional sports championship. This previously occurred in two World Series (1914, 1915), the 1974 Stanley Cup Final, and Super Bowl XXXIX in 2005.

This game was a rematch of Super Bowl XXXIX. Only one player, Patriots starting quarterback Tom Brady, remained on either roster from that contest. Bill Belichick, the Patriots' head coach in that contest, also remained in that position. Two Eagles, running back LeGarrette Blount and defensive lineman Chris Long, had been Patriots in Super Bowl LI, the previous year's Super Bowl. The Eagles were 1–4 against the Brady/Belichick era Patriots prior to this game (excluding preseason), including Super Bowl XXXIX. Philadelphia's lone win was a 35–28 victory at Gillette Stadium, week 13 in December, during their relatively weak 2015 season. The Eagles were behind 14–0, then proceeded to rally for 35 points and hold the Patriots to only two more touchdowns, allowing the visitors to finally get their revenge for eleven years prior.

The Patriots were the designated home team for Super Bowl LII, because the AFC team is the designated home team in even-numbered years and the NFC team in odd-numbered years. As the designated home team, the Patriots chose to wear their road white jerseys with navy blue pants, becoming the sixth team to wear their white jerseys as the home team and the third team to wear white in back-to-back Super Bowls, following the Dallas Cowboys in Super Bowls XII and XIII and again in Super Bowls XXVII and XXVIII. The Eagles therefore wore their standard home uniform of midnight green jerseys with white pants; the same two uniforms were worn when they faced off in Super Bowl XXXIX, but with the Eagles as the "home" team. Twelve of the previous 13 Super Bowls had been won by teams wearing white jerseys. The last team to win a Super Bowl while wearing their home uniforms was the Green Bay Packers in Super Bowl XLV (who, coincidentally, had also worn green jerseys).

Gambling establishments had the Patriots as 5 ½ point favorites and projected 47 ½ points scored.

==== Operations ====
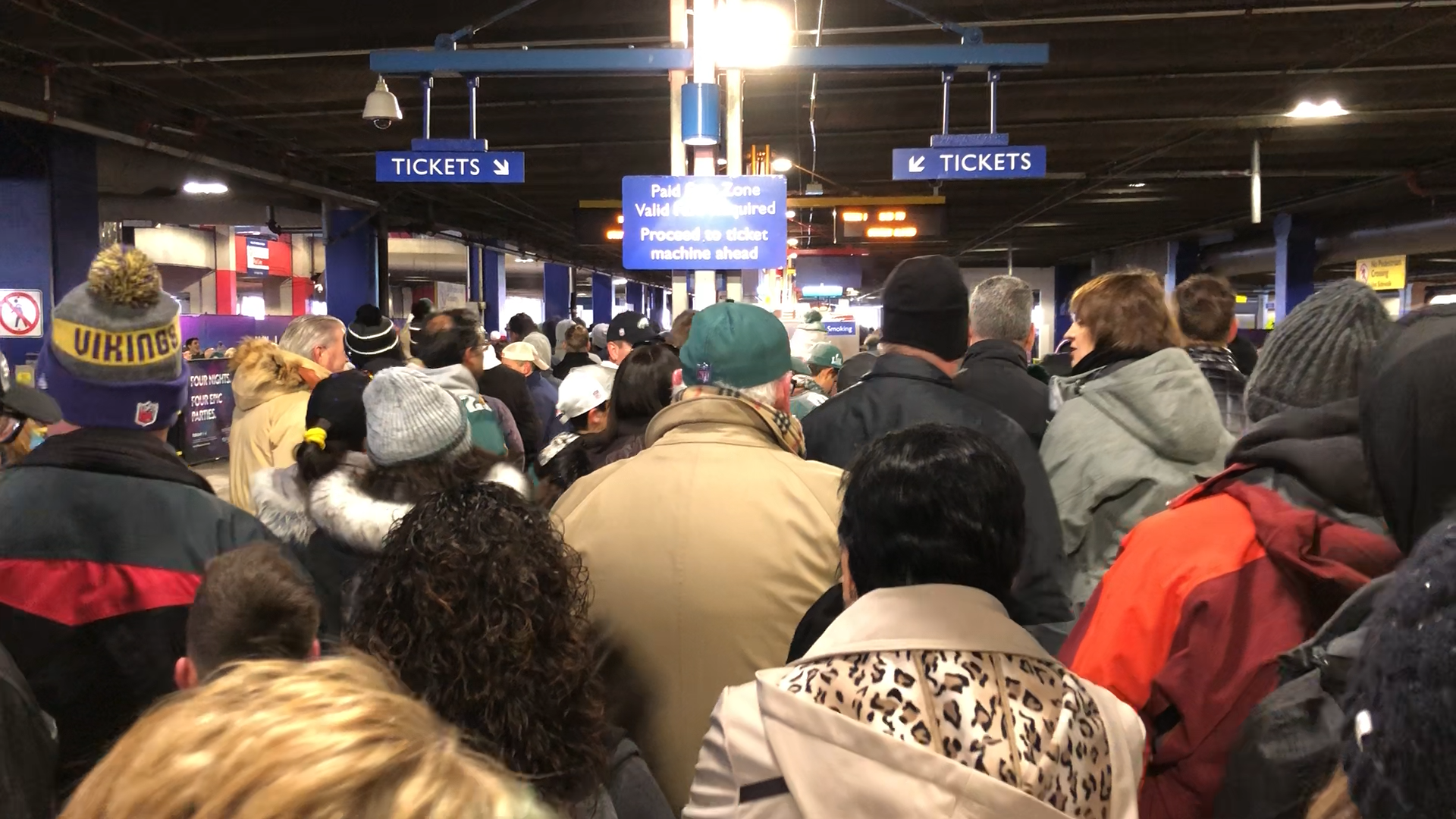
Security prescreening at the Mall of America before boarding the Metro Blue Line to U.S. Bank Stadium

To coordinate the game and 10 days of events, the National Football League temporarily operated an events office within the Minnesota Vikings office building next to U.S. Bank Stadium. More than 150,000 visitors were expected to attend events associated with the Super Bowl over ten days. Among them were some 5,000-plus media members; media day events and press conferences were held at The Mall of America in Bloomington, Minnesota.

No sales tax was collected on admission tickets to the game and related events, including parking.

To increase security around U.S. Bank Stadium, the stadium's light rail station was shut down for 48 hours before the game, and a nearby homeless shelter was temporarily moved beyond the security perimeter. The Blue Line of the light rail system was only open to ticketholders and passengers with a Gameday Pass, while the Green Line only ran to Stadium Village station on the University of Minnesota campus before continuing on with restricted access. Metro Transit ran shuttle buses between light rail stations, as well as regular bus service was moved for several weeks due to street closures. Thirty activist groups organized a rally and protest against police brutality, corporate greed, and racist practices. Seventeen people blocked the Green Line train for 90 minutes before the game, and 200 protesters blocked an entrance to the stadium's security perimeter.

Under a 1998 agreement, the Patriots and Eagles owners split the tickets, and the league controlled the game presentation and entertainment in the stadium. The Patriots practiced at the Minnesota Vikings facilities in Eden Prairie while the Eagles used the University of Minnesota. The Eagles got the Vikings' locker room and sideline. The Vikings had advanced to the NFC Championship Game before losing to the Eagles; until that point, the possibility of the Vikings advancing to the Super Bowl and thus becoming the first team to play the game in its home stadium was plausible. Had that happened, the Vikings would have used their own locker rooms and training facilities, while the AFC champion would have used the University of Minnesota.

== Broadcasting ==
=== United States ===
==== Television ====
Super Bowl LII was broadcast by NBC, as part of an annual cycle between CBS, Fox, and NBC. Play-by-play announcer Al Michaels and color analyst Cris Collinsworth called the game. Dan Patrick and Liam McHugh served as the lead hosts for NBC's pre-game coverage. Mike Tirico—who replaced the departing Bob Costas in 2017 as NBC's lead studio host for the NFL and the Olympic Games—did not participate in coverage of Super Bowl LII due to his commitments to the 2018 Winter Olympics in Pyeongchang, South Korea, which opened on the Friday following the game.

NBC employed 73 cameras within the stadium, and introduced "volumetric-AR" graphics featuring 3D body scanning of players, and a new on-air graphics package.

Sister cable network Universo carried a full Spanish language broadcast produced by Telemundo Deportes, with Edgar Lopez and Rene Giraldo. The Universo Spanish audio was also available on NBC through the SAP channel, where available. As NBC Sports Regional Networks operates regional sports networks in the markets of both teams which participated, the NBC Sports Boston and NBC Sports Philadelphia networks aired preview specials focusing on the Patriots and Eagles respectively, and a jointly-produced pre-game show.

2018 marked the first time since 1992 that a single U.S. broadcast network had aired both the Super Bowl and Winter Olympics in the same year. In 2022, the date of the Super Bowl would fall during an ongoing Winter Olympics for the first time: to prevent counterprogramming of NBC's Olympics coverage, Super Bowl LVI was swapped to NBC from CBS (who televised Super Bowl LV in 2021 instead). The situation would then be codified in the NFL's next media rights agreement, which added ABC as a fourth broadcaster to the cycle, and has all of NBC's future Super Bowl games fall during Winter Olympic years.

Nielsen reported a 47.4/70% overnight rating in metered markets, peaking at 52.2/74 during the fourth quarter. These numbers are about 3% lower than early numbers from Super Bowl LI, and the lowest since Super Bowl XLIV in 2010. The broadcast had an average of 103.4 million, down 7% of the previous year. However, according to Nielsen 2025's estimation, the game had 104.1 million of average audience with 43.1 of rating between NBC and Universo. Also, 2.6 million watched the game on streaming platforms. The total viewership was 106 million.

===== Advertising =====
Dan Lovinger, NBC Sports Group executive vice president of ad sales, stated to Variety in July 2017 that the network was seeking a price "north of $5 million" (the price set for the previous two Super Bowls) for a 30-second commercial during Super Bowl LII. NBC offered advertising packages that covered both Super Bowl LII and the Winter Olympics; the network estimated that it would bring in at least $1 billion in total advertising revenue across both events. During the second quarter, an equipment failure caused NBC's broadcast to experience dead air for 30 seconds during a commercial break. No actual commercial time was lost.

Advertisements for Tide detergent featuring David Harbour of Stranger Things created a recurring theme, appearing in each quarter, often disguised as well-known commercials for other products, with Harbour eventually declaring "It's a Tide ad." Anheuser-Busch has, as it has done in previous Super Bowls, purchased multiple commercials in the game, advertising Bud Light, Stella Artois and Michelob Ultra. For the first time since Super Bowl VIII, the company reduced the appearances of the Budweiser Clydesdales in a Super Bowl commercial, with the 60-second Budweiser commercial for this event instead focusing on a Budweiser factory plant in Georgia distributing water, referencing the beer maker's efforts to distribute water to families of victims affected by natural disasters, such as wildfires and hurricanes. However, a Clydesdale was featured in a commercial for Tide detergent and the Budweiser Clydesdales only appeared in a five-second Budweiser commercial to remind viewers of the "ClydesdaleCam" livestream event. Other signed advertisers included The Coca-Cola Company and Avocados from Mexico. Cellphone carrier T-Mobile aired a minute long ad with actress Kerry Washington narrating, featuring babies of various ethnic backgrounds. The commercial also features Nirvana's song "All Apologies" played as a lullaby. In the ad, Washington talks about the babies being born with natural instincts of love and not racism calling them "unstoppable" and that they will demand fair and equal pay. T-Mobile CEO John Legere posted to his Twitter account afterwards saying, "This year, we wanted to use our #SuperBowl airtime to share that @TMobile believes we all started in the same place. We are more alike than different. And we are unstoppable."

Fiat Chrysler subsidiary Ram Trucks was met with criticism over its ad "Built to Serve", which featured an excerpt from Martin Luther King Jr.'s "Drum Major Instinct" sermon on the virtues of serving others (February 4, 2018, was also the 50th anniversary of the sermon). The ad was considered an exploitation of King's words to sell a product, with media outlets noting that the sermon in the ad went on to specifically criticize advertisers (including automobile manufacturers) for being "gentlemen of massive verbal persuasion".

===== Lead-out programs =====
NBC's lead-out program was an episode of This Is Us, titled "Super Bowl Sunday", alongside a special episode of The Tonight Show Starring Jimmy Fallon from Minneapolis' Orpheum Theatre, with halftime performer Justin Timberlake, Dwayne Johnson, Chris Stapleton and the cast of This Is Us as guests.

In a surprise move, Netflix used its advertising time to announce that The Cloverfield Paradox — the third film in the Cloverfield series — would be available for streaming on the service immediately after the game, potentially undercutting viewership of the lucrative post-game slot on NBC.

==== Streaming ====
Online streams of the NBC broadcast were available on NBCSports.com, the NBC Sports app for mobile devices, tablets, connected-TV devices, and NBC.com without any required login. The Spanish-language broadcast was available on the Telemundo Deportes En Vivo app and TelemundoDeportes.com for desktop devices, connected TV devices, and tablets but not mobile devices.

Under new digital rights deals that began with the 2017–18 playoffs, Verizon still offered mobile streaming of games, but no longer held exclusive rights to stream NFL games on smartphones or make them exclusive to Verizon Wireless subscribers. Instead, Verizon elected to use the deal to bolster its recent acquisition of Yahoo!; on January 9, 2018, Verizon announced that it would host streams of playoff games through the Yahoo! Sports and go90 app, including Super Bowl LII. As a result of the deal, the online stream was available to viewers on all Internet devices for the first time, regardless of network (because of Verizon's previous exclusive rights deal, non-Verizon phones had previously been blocked from receiving any NFL telecasts, regardless of source). The game was also available through the NFL Mobile app with the aforementioned change to viewing through the app now being allowed on all mobile carriers.

==== Radio ====
This was the last game in Westwood One's national radio contract with the NFL before a quiet renewal on undermined terms after the season and Cumulus exited a chapter 11 bankruptcy filing made just before the Super Bowl. Each participating team's flagship station (the Patriots Radio Network's WBZ-FM/Boston, and the Eagles Radio Network's WIP-FM/Philadelphia, along with WEMG/Camden, New Jersey for Spanish play-by-play) carried the game with local announcers. For the second consecutive year, none of the local flagships were clear-channel stations, and thus the local commentators were only audible for free within each respective team's immediate metropolitan area; listeners outside the flagship stations' broadcast ranges were required to subscribe to Sirius XM Radio or TuneIn Premium to access the local broadcasts. Under the terms of the Westwood One contract, any radio station that was not a local flagship, if it carried the game, was required to utilize the Westwood One feed. It was the first title win called by Eagles play-by-play announcer Merrill Reese, who has been the primary radio voice of the team since 1977.

=== International ===
	Rights holder(s)
Australia	The event aired live on the Seven Network and 7mate. The game was also broadcast on Melbourne Radio Station 1116 SEN commentated by Gerard Whateley becoming the first Australian to commentate the Super Bowl.
Brazil	The Super Bowl was shown live by ESPN Brasil, with Paulo Antunes and Everaldo Marques as the announcers for the evening. It was also shown live on Cinemark, Cinépolis, Kinoplex and UCI movie theaters across the country.
Canada	Bell Media holds broadcast rights for local stations in Canada and aired the game across its networks on CTV, CTV Two, RDS (for French), TSN Radio and TSN2; TSN's regional networks did not carry the game due to a scheduling conflict with the 2018 Scotties Tournament of Hearts, the national women's curling championship. Due to the game being exempt from the CRTC's simultaneous substitution regulations for the second year in a row, Bell reprised the previous year's usage of a sweepstakes and entertainment features to retain Canadian audiences. On RDS, the announcer was David Arsenault with Pierre Vercheval as analyst and Didier Orméjuste on the sidelines.
France	beIn Sports2 and W9 broadcast the event.
Germany	ProSieben broadcast the Super Bowl for the first time, after it had previously been on sister channel Sat.1 since Super Bowl XLVI. It was shown for no additional cost in standard-definition and on ProSieben HD in high-definition on HD+ as well as multiple cable and IPTV providers. It was also available on internet streaming service DAZN for no cost in addition to the regular subscription fee.
India	Sony SIX
Philippines	The 5 Network broadcast the event in the Philippines.
United Kingdom	Super Bowl LII aired live on BBC One. In a change to tradition, the BBC chose to use NBC's feed instead of the NFL Films and NFL Network produced World Feed.
(United States) U.S. military bases	American Forces Network carried the Super Bowl live to members of the United States Armed Forces in Eurasia.

== Entertainment ==
=== Pre-game ===
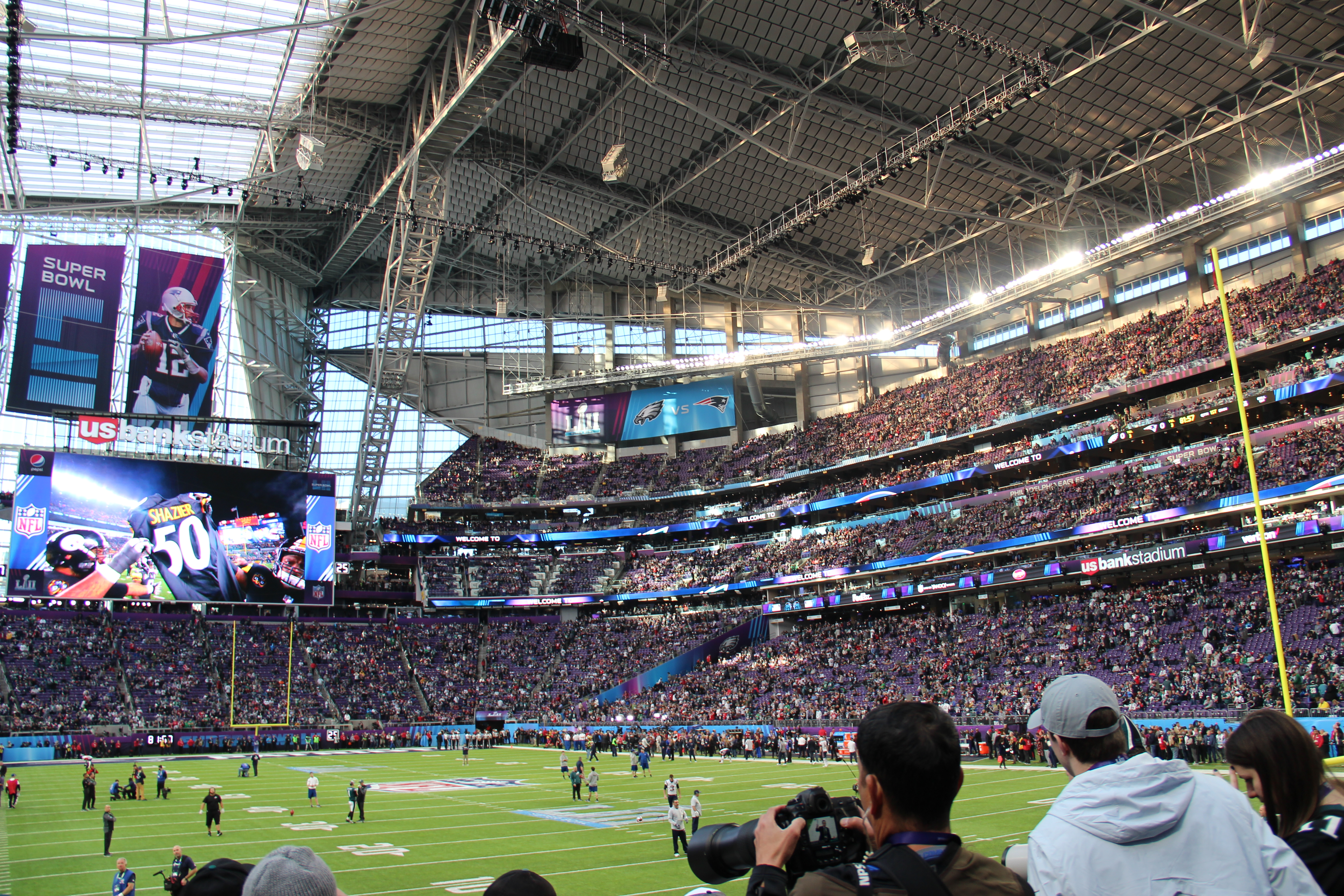
The inside of U.S. Bank Stadium on game day

The Super Bowl flyover was a unique combination of airplanes—and a first for the Super Bowl. It was the first time the Heritage Flight team conducted a flyover for a Super Bowl. The U.S. Air Force Heritage Flight performed a flawless execution perfectly timed with Pink's National Anthem. It consisted of one F-16 Fighting Falcon, two A-10 Thunderbolt IIs, and one P-51 Mustang flying in formation over U.S. Bank Stadium.

Pink performed "The Star-Spangled Banner" and Leslie Odom Jr. sang "America the Beautiful". Coincidentally, both Pink and Odom are from the Philadelphia area. Pink spit out a throat lozenge shortly before singing the anthem, later verified after many commentators thought she had spit out a piece of gum. She reported being ill with flu symptoms during her performance. No players were observed kneeling during the national anthem, in contrast to the protests in the 2016 and 2017 seasons.

Fifteen Medal of Honor recipients participated in the coin toss ceremony. World War II hero Hershel W. Williams was the honorary captain and had the honors of flipping the coin.

=== Halftime show ===
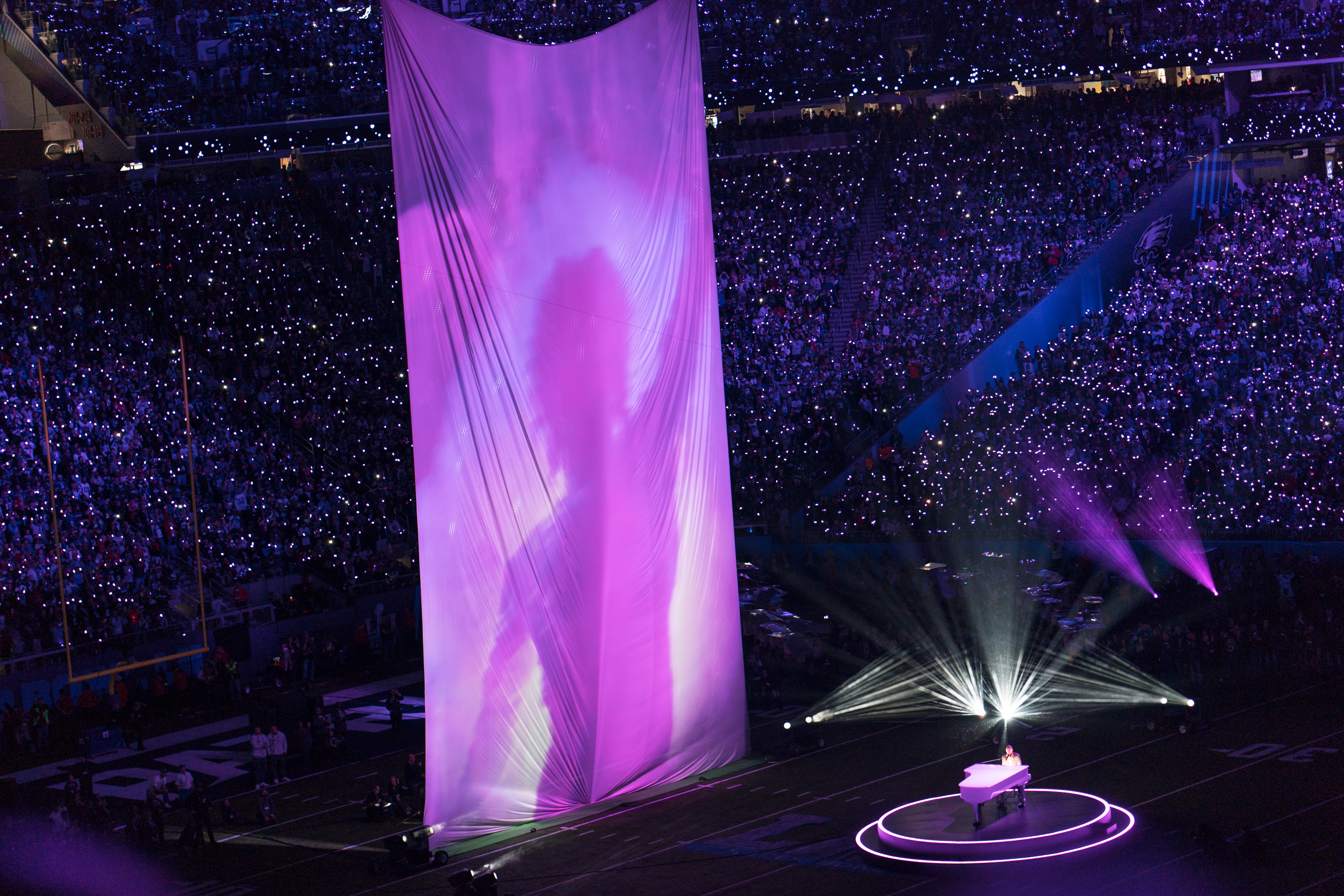
Justin Timberlake performs on piano alongside projected archive footage of Prince during the Super Bowl LII halftime show

Justin Timberlake headlined the Super Bowl LII halftime show, along with his band "The Tennessee Kids" and featuring the University of Minnesota Marching Band. Timberlake performed in two previous Super Bowls: Super Bowl XXXV in 2001 as a member of NSYNC, and Super Bowl XXXVIII in 2004 with Janet Jackson.

Timberlake's performance drew criticism for not being "spectacular", looking to be safe and avoid incidents such as the infamous "wardrobe malfunction" during his performance with Jackson, and for incorporating a video of Prince, who opposed performances combining the dead and the living.

== Game summary ==
=== First half ===
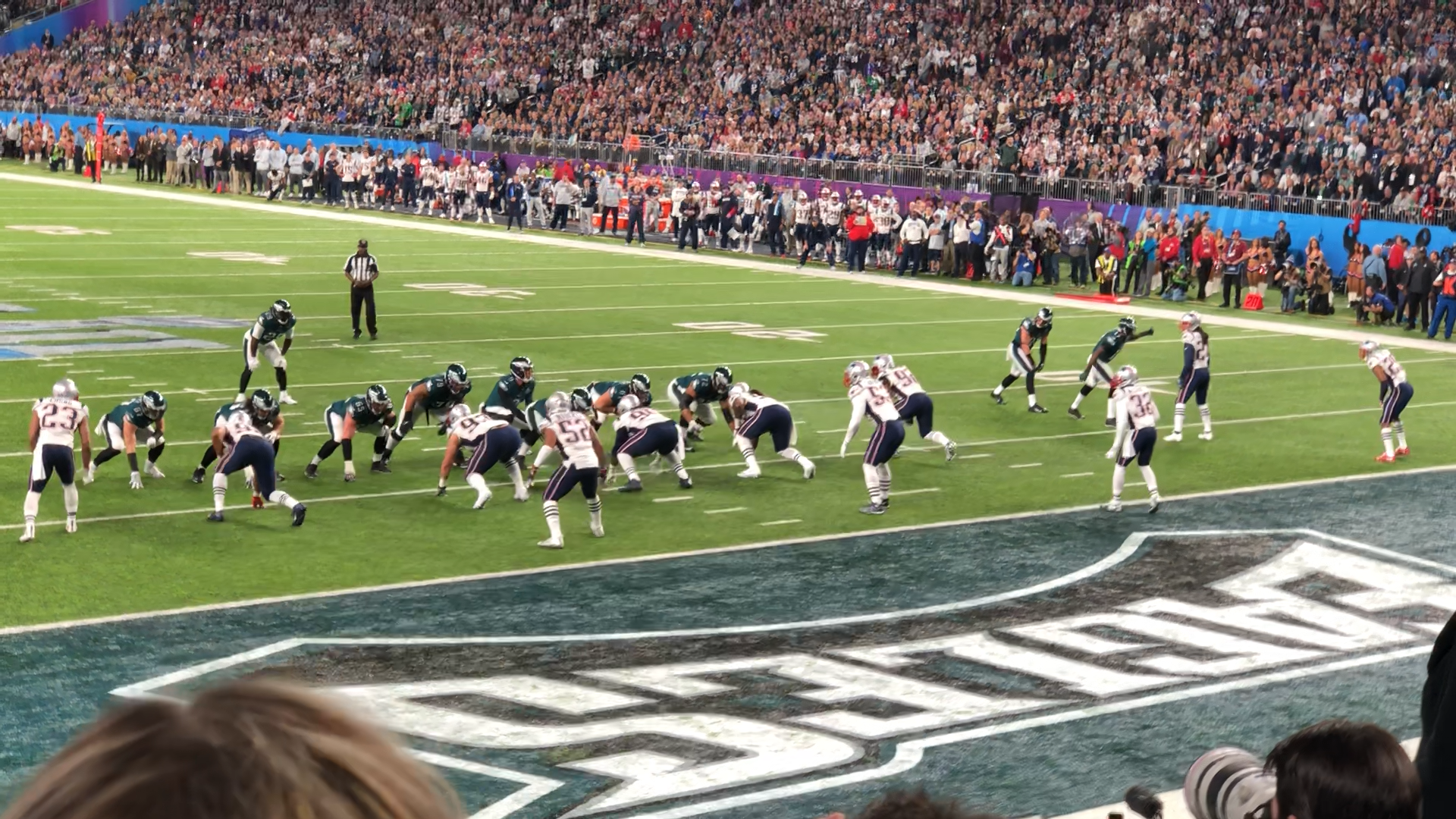
A Philadelphia Eagles handoff during the first quarter

The Patriots won the opening coin toss and elected to defer to the second half. They kicked off to the Eagles, who opened the game with a 14-play, 67-yard drive that took 7:05 off the clock and resulted in a 25-yard field goal by kicker Jake Elliott, giving them an early 3–0 lead. The drive was controlled by the arm of Eagles quarterback Nick Foles, who completed six of nine passes to five different receivers for 61 yards, with a few short runs by running backs LeGarrette Blount and Jay Ajayi mixed in. Foles also made two critical completions on third down plays, hitting wide receiver Alshon Jeffery for a 17-yard gain on 3rd-and-4, and later found wide receiver Torrey Smith for a 15-yard completion 3rd-and-12. The Patriots responded with a drive of their own, almost with exactly the same results; quarterback Tom Brady completed four of six passes for 58 yards to four different receivers, the longest a 28-yard strike to wide receiver Chris Hogan. The drive stalled out on the Philadelphia 8-yard line, where they settled for kicker Stephen Gostkowski's 26-yard field goal, tying the game at 3–3. The game's first touchdown was scored by the Eagles on the next drive, taking only three plays: a 7-yard pass from Foles to wide receiver Nelson Agholor, a 36-yard run up the middle by Blount, and a 34-yard touchdown pass from Foles to Jeffery. The ensuing extra point attempt by Elliott missed wide right, keeping the score at 9–3 in favor of the Eagles. The Patriots responded by advancing the ball to the Philadelphia 8-yard line on their next drive, which was set up by a 50-yard completion from Brady to wide receiver Danny Amendola, where the first quarter ended.

The Patriots came away empty-handed on the second play of the second quarter, as Gostkowski missed a 26-yard field goal attempt after punter/holder Ryan Allen mishandled the snap, causing the ball to hit the left upright. New England's defense forced the game's only punt on the next drive. On the next drive, Brady completed a 23-yard pass to wide receiver Brandin Cooks, but a hard hit by safety Malcolm Jenkins knocked the receiver out of the game with a concussion. On third down from the Philadelphia 35-yard line, the Patriots attempted a trick play that involved two handoffs and a pass downfield to Brady, who was open but dropped the throw from Amendola. They went for it on fourth down, and a deep pass intended for tight end Rob Gronkowski was broken up by cornerback Jalen Mills, giving the Eagles the ball on their own 35-yard line. They capitalized on a drive featuring two key completions, a 19-yard catch by tight end Zach Ertz on 3rd-and-7 and a 22-yard reception by Jeffery on the New England 21-yard line. On the next play, Blount went the distance for a 21-yard touchdown run to increase the Eagles' lead to 15–3, but a two-point conversion failed when Foles' pass to Jeffery was broken up by cornerback Eric Rowe. The Patriots quickly struck back, as Brady completed a 46-yard pass to running back Rex Burkhead on the first play after the kickoff. But the team could only gain two more yards, resulting in Gostkowski's 45-yard field goal to cut their deficit to 15–6.

The Eagles got the ball back with 7:24 left in the half and looked poised to score another touchdown after a 26-yard run by Ajayi gave them a first down on the New England 43-yard line. But on the next play, Foles threw a pass intended for Jeffery that was broken up by cornerback Stephon Gilmore and intercepted by safety Duron Harmon. The Patriots took advantage of the turnover with a seven-play, 90-yard drive, which was almost a three-and-out, but a holding penalty on Mills allowed the Patriots to continue their drive. The last two plays featured a 43-yard completion from Brady to Hogan, followed by a 26-yard touchdown run by running back James White. Gostkowski missed the ensuing extra point wide left, but the score was now 15–12 in favor of the Eagles. Philadelphia running back Kenjon Barner returned the ensuing kickoff 27 yards to his own 30-yard line as time ran down to the two-minute warning. Two plays later, on 3rd-and-3, Foles completed a short pass to running back Corey Clement, who took off for a 55-yard gain to the New England 8-yard line. Clement ran the ball six yards to the two-yard line on the next play. Two plays later, Philadelphia faced 4th-and-goal on the 1-yard line with 38 seconds left in the half. Deciding to go for the touchdown, they attempted a similar trick play to the one that had failed for the Patriots earlier, in what became the game's most memorable play. As Foles stepped up to the running back position, Clement took a direct snap and pitched the ball to tight end Trey Burton, who then threw the ball perfectly to Foles, who was wide open in the right side of the end zone. Foles caught the ball, making him the first quarterback ever to catch a touchdown pass in a Super Bowl, giving the Eagles a 22–12 halftime lead. This play became known as the Philly Special.

The first half resulted in numerous Super Bowl records from both teams, including most total yards combined (673). This was also the first time two quarterbacks had thrown for over 200 yards in the first half of a Super Bowl, with Brady throwing for 276 yards and Foles 215.

=== Second half ===
The Patriots received the second-half kickoff and Brady led them 75 yards in eight plays. Gronkowski, who caught only one pass for 9 yards in the first half, caught four for 68 yards on the drive, the last a 5-yard touchdown reception to cut New England's deficit to 22–19. The Eagles responded by moving the ball 85 yards in 11 plays on a drive that consumed less than five minutes and featured three critical third-down conversions by Foles. The first was a 17-yard pass to Agholor on 3rd-and-6 from the Eagles 19-yard line. Later in the drive, he threw a 14-yard completion to Ertz on 3rd-and-1 from the New England 40-yard line. Finally, he finished the possession with a 22-yard touchdown pass to Clement on 3rd-and-6, increasing Philadelphia's lead to 29–19. The touchdown was upheld upon review, as officials confirmed that Clement kept both feet in bounds and controlled the ball. New England responded with a 10-play, 75-yard drive, with Brady completing all three of his passes for 60 yards, the last one a 26-yard touchdown pass to Hogan that cut their deficit back to a field goal at 29–26. The Eagles followed with an 8-play, 51-yard drive featuring a 24-yard completion from Foles to Agholor on the first play, followed by a 17-yard pass to Smith to reach the New England 24-yard line. On the second play of the fourth quarter, Elliott kicked a 42-yard field goal to bring the score to 32–26.

Brady then came back with another 75-yard drive, featuring three consecutive passes to Amendola for 46 yards, and ending with a 4-yard touchdown pass to Gronkowski, giving the Patriots their first lead of the game, 33–32. On their next drive, the Eagles faced 3rd-and-6 after two plays but were able to keep the ball with a 7-yard catch by Ertz. Eventually, they faced a 4th-and-1 on their own 45-yard line with 5:39 left in the game. Deciding to go for the conversion rather than punt, Foles completed a 2-yard pass to Ertz that kept the drive alive. Then Foles picked up three consecutive first downs with passes to Agholor for 38 total yards, moving the ball to the New England 14-yard line. Following a 3-yard run by Ajayi, Foles threw an 11-yard touchdown pass to Ertz with 2:21 remaining in the game. The play was upheld on review; Ertz lost the ball after touching the ground in the end zone, but it was determined that he established himself as a runner and maintained control of the ball as he broke the plane of the goal line. The two-point conversion failed for the second time in the game when linebacker Kyle Van Noy broke up Foles' pass intended for Clement, keeping the Eagles' lead at 38–33.

The Patriots got the ball back on their own 25-yard line with the chance to mount a game-winning drive. On the second play of the drive, however, defensive end Brandon Graham stripped the ball from Brady for the game's only sack, and defensive end Derek Barnett recovered the fumble on the New England 31-yard line, allowing the Eagles to run the clock down to 1:05 and force the Patriots to use all their remaining timeouts. Elliott then kicked a 46-yard field goal to increase Philadelphia's lead to 41–33. New England now needed a touchdown and a two-point conversion to force overtime. After nine plays (one of them a 13-yard catch by Amendola on 4th-and-10), the Patriots reached their own 49-yard line, and with only nine seconds remaining, Brady threw a Hail Mary pass to the end zone as time expired. With six Eagles defenders covering Gronkowski, the pass fell incomplete, and Philadelphia won their first Vince Lombardi Trophy in franchise history, and their first league championship since 1960, ending the third-longest active championship drought in the NFL at 57 years.

The Eagles became just the second team to win a Super Bowl rematch after losing the first Super Bowl meeting with the same team, having lost to New England in Super Bowl XXXIX, and the first since the Washington Redskins defeated the Miami Dolphins in Super Bowl XVII (Miami defeated Washington in Super Bowl VII.) The Eagles also became the first Super Bowl champions since the 1978 Pittsburgh Steelers to defeat both Super Bowl participants from the previous year in the same postseason. Additionally, the NFC East became the first division where every team had won a Super Bowl.

=== Game statistics ===
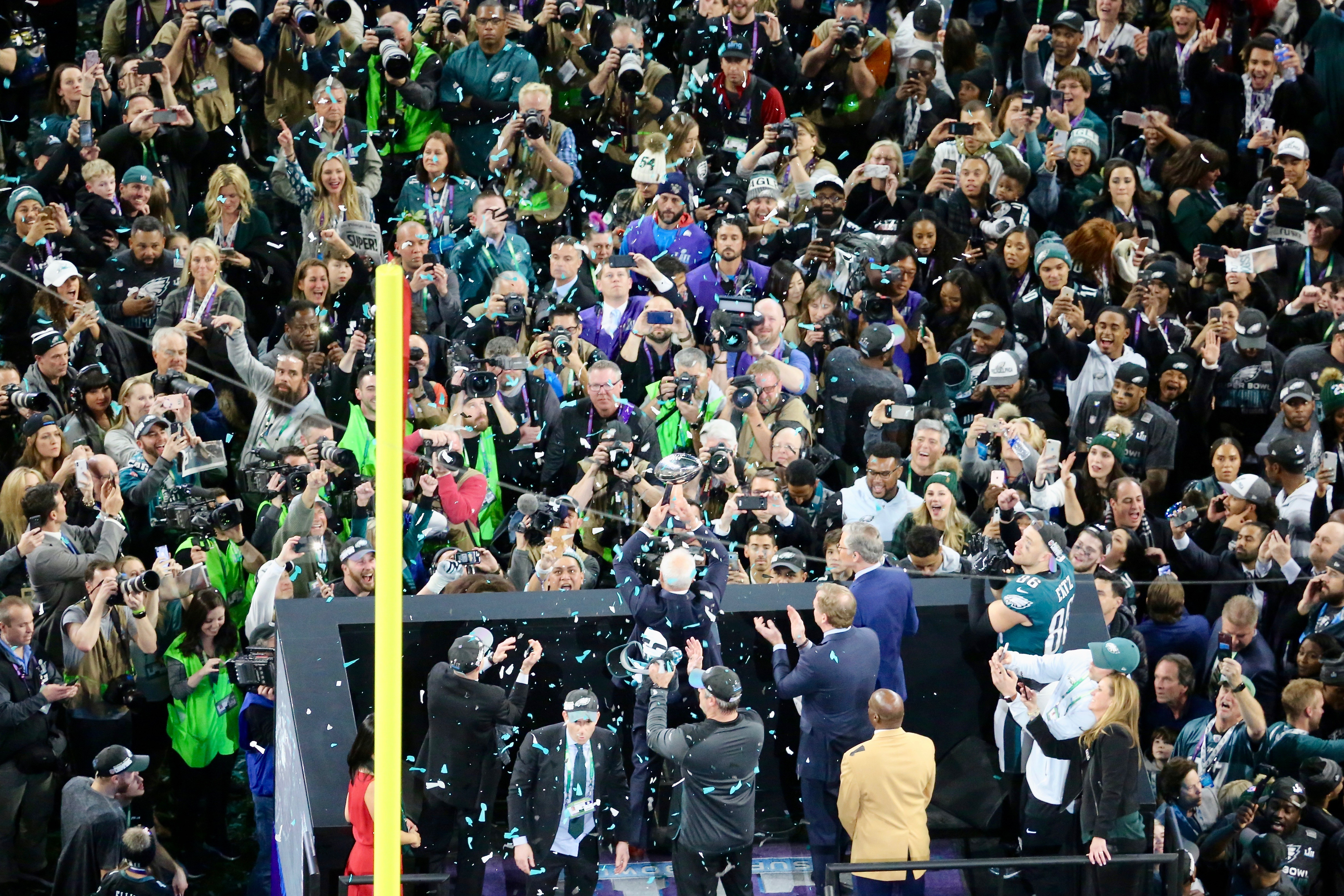
The Philadelphia Eagles are presented with the Vince Lombardi Trophy

The combined 74 points scored was one point shy of the Super Bowl record of 75, set in Super Bowl XXIX in 1995; it and this game marked only the second time in the game's history where the teams combined for 70+ points. The game also set a record for most yardage by both teams (combined) with 1,151 yards, the most for any single game, regular season or postseason. The game set many other Super Bowl records as well, including fewest punts from both teams (one), and most yards gained by a team (613 for New England).

Foles completed 28 of 43 passes for 373 yards and three touchdowns, with one interception, and caught a touchdown pass. Clement, who caught only 10 passes for 123 yards and two touchdowns during the season, was the Eagles' leading receiver with four receptions for 100 yards and a touchdown, while also rushing for eight yards. Agholor had nine receptions for 84 yards. Blount was the game's top rusher with 90 yards and a touchdown. Brady completed 28 of 48 passes for 505 yards and three touchdowns, breaking the record for most passing yards in a Super Bowl that he had set in the previous season. Amendola was his top target, with eight receptions for 152 yards, while Hogan had six for 128 yards and a touchdown and Gronkowski caught nine for 116 yards and two scores.

=== Box score ===
Philadelphia Eagles vs. New England Patriots – Game summary

Quarter	1	2	3	4	Total
Eagles (NFC)	9	13	7	12	41
Patriots (AFC)	3	9	14	7	33

at U.S. Bank Stadium, Minneapolis, Minnesota

- Date: February 4, 2018
- Game time: 5:31 p.m. CST
- Game weather: Played indoors (domed stadium)
- Game attendance: 67,612
- Referee: Gene Steratore
- TV announcers (NBC): Al Michaels, Cris Collinsworth, Michele Tafoya
- Recap, Game Book

Scoring summary

Quarter	Time	Drive			Team	Scoring information	Score	
Quarter	Time	Plays	Yards	TOP	Team	Scoring information	PHI	NE
1	7:55	14	67	7:05	PHI	25-yard field goal by Jake Elliott	3	0
1	4:17	9	67	3:38	NE	26-yard field goal by Stephen Gostkowski	3	3
1	2:34	3	77	1:43	PHI	Alshon Jeffery 34-yard touchdown reception from Nick Foles, Elliott kick no good (wide right)	9	3
2	8:48	6	65	3:05	PHI	LeGarrette Blount 21-yard touchdown run, 2-point pass no good	15	3
2	7:24	5	48	1:24	NE	45-yard field goal by Gostkowski	15	6
2	2:04	7	90	2:57	NE	James White 26-yard touchdown run, Gostkowski kick no good (wide left)	15	12
2	0:34	7	70	1:30	PHI	Foles 1-yard touchdown reception from Trey Burton, Elliott kick good	22	12
3	12:15	8	75	2:45	NE	Rob Gronkowski 5-yard touchdown reception from Tom Brady, Gostkowski kick good	22	19
3	7:18	11	85	4:57	PHI	Corey Clement 22-yard touchdown reception from Foles, Elliott kick good	29	19
3	3:23	7	75	3:55	NE	Chris Hogan 26-yard touchdown reception from Brady, Gostkowski kick good	29	26
4	14:09	8	51	4:14	PHI	42-yard field goal by Elliott	32	26
4	9:22	10	75	4:47	NE	Gronkowski 4-yard touchdown reception from Brady, Gostkowski kick good	32	33
4	2:21	14	75	7:01	PHI	Zach Ertz 11-yard touchdown reception from Foles, 2-point pass no good	38	33
4	1:05	4	4	1:04	PHI	46-yard field goal by Elliott	41	33
"TOP" = time of possession. For other American football terms, see Glossary of American football.							41	33

== Final statistics ==
=== Statistical comparison ===
Statistic	Philadelphia Eagles	New England Patriots
First downs	25	29
First downs rushing	6	4
First downs passing	19	23
First downs penalty	0	2
Third down efficiency	10/16	5/10
Fourth down efficiency	2/2	1/2
Total net yards	538	613
Net yards rushing	164	113
Rushing attempts	27	22
Yards per rush	6.1	5.1
Net yards passing	374	500
Passing–completions/attempts	29/44	28/49
Times sacked–total yards	0–0	1–5
Interceptions thrown	1	0
Punt returns–total yards	0–0	0–0
Kickoff returns–total yards	4–98	3–44
Interceptions–total return yards	0–0	1–8
Punts–average yardage	1–41	0–0
Fumbles–lost	0–0	1–1
Penalties–yards	6–35	1–5
Time of possession	34:04	25:56
Turnovers	1	1

- The lone Eagles punt was received with a fair catch.

Records set (Unless otherwise noted, all records were only Super Bowl records)
Most yards allowed	613	Philadelphia Eagles
Most yards allowed in a win	613	Philadelphia Eagles
Most Super Bowl appearances, as team	10	New England Patriots
Most points scored in a Super Bowl, losing team	33	New England Patriots
Most total yards, team (game)	613	New England Patriots
Most passing yards, team (postseason game)	500	New England Patriots
Fewest punts, team (game)	0	New England Patriots
Most players, 100 or more receiving yards	3	(Amendola 152, Hogan 128, Gronkowski 116)
Most Super Bowl appearances, as player	8	Tom Brady (New England)
Most Super Bowl appearances, as starting player	8	Tom Brady (New England)
Most pass attempts, player (career)	357	Tom Brady (New England)
Most pass completions, player (career)	235	Tom Brady (New England)
Most passing yards, player (any postseason game)	505	Tom Brady (New England)
Most passing yards, player (career)	2,576	Tom Brady (New England)
Most touchdown passes, player (career)	18	Tom Brady (New England)
Oldest quarterback, as player	40 years 185 days	Tom Brady (New England)
Oldest quarterback, as starting player	40 years 185 days	Tom Brady (New England)
Most Super Bowl appearances, as head coach	8	Bill Belichick (New England)
Most Super Bowl appearances, as coach	11	Bill Belichick (New England)
Most Super Bowl appearances, in any capacity	11	Bill Belichick (New England)
Most TD receptions, as quarterback (game)	1	Nick Foles (Philadelphia)
Most TD receptions, as quarterback (career)	1	Nick Foles (Philadelphia)
Most Super Bowl games with TD pass and TD reception	1	Nick Foles (Philadelphia)
Longest field goal kicked by a rookie	46 yards	Jake Elliott (Philadelphia)
Most receiving yards, game, tight end	116	Rob Gronkowski (New England)
Most total yards, both teams (any NFL game)	1,151	Philadelphia Eagles vs. New England Patriots
Most first downs passing, both teams (game)	42	Philadelphia Eagles vs. New England Patriots
Most passing yards, both teams (any postseason game)	874	Philadelphia Eagles vs. New England Patriots
Most missed PAT attempts, both teams (game)	4	Philadelphia Eagles vs. New England Patriots
Fewest punts, both teams (game)	1	Philadelphia Eagles vs. New England Patriots
Records tied
Fewest times sacked, as team (game)	0	Philadelphia Eagles
Fewest fumbles, as team (game)	0	Philadelphia Eagles
Fewest fumbles lost, as team (game)	0	Philadelphia Eagles
Fewest punt returns, as team (game)	0	Philadelphia Eagles
Most missed PAT attempts, as team (game)	3	Philadelphia Eagles
Most Super Bowl losses, as team	5	New England Patriots
Fewest punt returns, as team (game)	0	New England Patriots
Most Super Bowl appearances, as kicker	5	Stephen Gostkowski (New England)
Most pass attempts with no interceptions (game)	48	Tom Brady (New England)
Most field goals, both teams (game)	5	Philadelphia Eagles vs. New England Patriots
Most first downs, both teams (game)	54	Philadelphia Eagles vs. New England Patriots
Most pass attempts, both teams (game)	93	Philadelphia Eagles vs. New England Patriots
Most touchdown passes, both teams (game)	7	Philadelphia Eagles vs. New England Patriots
Fewest times sacked, both teams (game)	1	Philadelphia Eagles vs. New England Patriots
Fewest punt returns, both teams (game)	0	Philadelphia Eagles vs. New England Patriots
Fewest punt return yards, both teams (game)	0	Philadelphia Eagles vs. New England Patriots

=== Individual statistics ===
Eagles passing
	C/ATT^{1}	Yds	TD	INT	Rating
Nick Foles	28/43	373	3	1	106.1
Trey Burton	1/1	1	1	0	118.8
Eagles rushing
	Car^{2}	Yds	TD	LG^{3}	Yds/Car
LeGarrette Blount	14	90	1	36	6.4
Jay Ajayi	9	57	0	26	6.3
Nelson Agholor	1	9	0	9	9.0
Corey Clement	3	8	0	6	2.7
Eagles receiving
	Rec^{4}	Yds	TD	LG^{3}	Target^{5}
Nelson Agholor	9	84	0	24	11
Zach Ertz	7	67	1	19	9
Torrey Smith	5	49	0	17	9
Corey Clement	4	100	1	55	5
Alshon Jeffery	3	73	1	34	8
Nick Foles	1	1	1	1	1
Trey Burton	0	0	0	0	1

Patriots passing
	C/ATT^{1}	Yds	TD	INT	Rating
Tom Brady	28/48	505	3	0	115.4
Danny Amendola	0/1	0	0	0	39.6
Patriots rushing
	Car^{2}	Yds	TD	LG^{3}	Yds/Car
James White	7	45	1	26	6.4
Dion Lewis	9	39	0	8	4.3
Rex Burkhead	3	18	0	9	6.0
Tom Brady	1	6	0	6	6.0
Chris Hogan	1	4	0	4	4.0
Brandin Cooks	1	1	0	1	1.0
Patriots receiving
	Rec^{4}	Yds	TD	LG^{3}	Target^{5}
Rob Gronkowski	9	116	2	25	15
Danny Amendola	8	152	0	50	11
Chris Hogan	6	128	1	43	8
James White	2	21	0	15	6
Rex Burkhead	1	46	0	46	1
Brandin Cooks	1	23	0	23	2
Phillip Dorsett	1	19	0	19	2
Tom Brady	0	0	0	0	1
James Develin	0	0	0	0	1

^{1}Completions/attempts
^{2}Carries
^{3}Long gain
^{4}Receptions
^{5}Times targeted

== Starting lineups ==
Philadelphia	Position	Position	New England
Offense
Alshon Jeffery	WR		Brandin Cooks
Halapoulivaati Vaitai	LT		Nate Solder
Stefen Wisniewski	LG		Joe Thuney
Jason Kelce	C		David Andrews
Brandon Brooks	RG		Shaq Mason
Lane Johnson	RT		Cameron Fleming
Zach Ertz	TE		Rob Gronkowski
Nelson Agholor	WR		Chris Hogan
Nick Foles	QB		Tom Brady
LeGarrette Blount	RB		Dion Lewis
Torrey Smith	WR	FB	James Develin
Defense
Vinny Curry	DE	LE	Trey Flowers
Timmy Jernigan	DT		Lawrence Guy
Fletcher Cox	DT		Malcom Brown
Brandon Graham	DE	LB	James Harrison
Mychal Kendricks	OLB	LB	Kyle Van Noy
Nigel Bradham	OLB	LB	Elandon Roberts
Jalen Mills	CB	RCB	Stephon Gilmore
Ronald Darby	CB	LCB	Eric Rowe
Corey Graham	S		Patrick Chung
Rodney McLeod	S		Devin McCourty
Malcolm Jenkins	S		Duron Harmon

== Officials ==
Super Bowl LII had seven officials. The numbers in parentheses below indicate their uniform numbers.

- Referee: Gene Steratore (114)
- Umpire: Roy Ellison (81)
- Down judge: Jerry Bergman (91)
- Line judge: Byron Boston (18)
- Field judge: Tom Hill (97)
- Side judge: Scott Edwards (3)
- Back judge: Perry Paganelli (46)
- Replay official: Paul Weidner
- Alternate referee: Craig Wrolstad (4)
- Alternate umpire: Ruben Fowler (71)
- Alternate wing: Ed Camp (134)
- Alternate deep: Jimmy Buchanan (86)
- Alternate back judge: Greg Steed (12)

This was Steratore's first—and eventually only—Super Bowl as a referee, though he had been previously selected as an alternate for Super Bowl XLIV. Steratore retired from officiating after 15 seasons on June 22, 2018, and joined CBS Sports as a rule analyst starting with the 2018 season.

== Aftermath ==
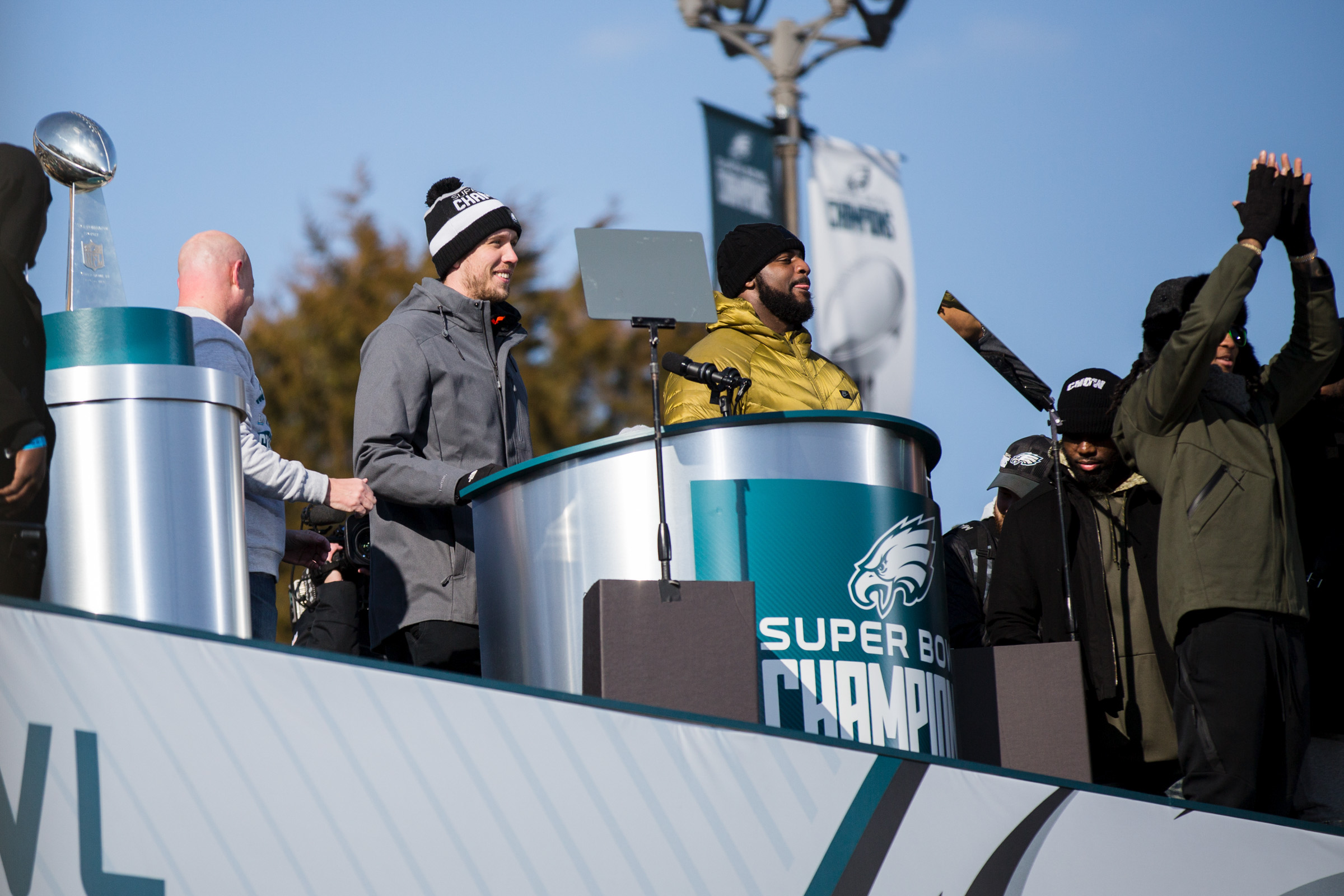
Nick Foles speaking at the team's Super Bowl parade.

The Eagles championship parade took place On February 9th; it started at Broad Street and Pattison Avenue, moving north toward the Philadelphia Museum of Art. An estimated 1.4 million fans attended the city's first Super Bowl parade.

=== Eagles White House visit controversy ===
On May 23, 2018, NFL Commissioner Roger Goodell and all NFL team owners, except for two that abstained from voting in a show of hand voting process, approved a new policy that would require all players to stand during the national anthem or be given the option to stay in the locker room during the national anthem. The vote took place without consulting the NFLPA. The policy also stated that any players from all NFL teams who protested the anthem while on the field would become subject to discipline from the league. In addition, the teams as a whole would be subject to punishment and other forms of discipline from the NFL as a result.

In disagreement with the policy, several players on the Super Bowl champions Philadelphia Eagles indicated that they would decline an invitation from Trump to visit the White House on June 5, leading the President to rescind the offer the day before the event. The Eagles were the second sports franchise that Trump had uninvited, joining the 2017 National Basketball Association (NBA) champion Golden State Warriors, whose visit was cancelled after several players publicly declined to attend. The Eagles were also the first Super Bowl-winning team to not be invited to visit the White House since 1979, the year before the first official visit.

=== Philly Special Statue ===
In September 2018, a statue commemorating the Philly Special, showing the moment of discussion between Nick Foles and Doug Pederson, was unveiled at Lincoln Financial Field. The statue was commissioned by Bud Light and sculpted by Raymond Gibby.
