= I Believe (Sounds of Blackness song) =

1994 single by Sounds of Blackness

Single by Sounds of Blackness

from the album Africa to America: The Journey of the Drum
- Released: 1994
- Genre: Funk; gospel; hip hop soul; house (remix)
- Length: 3:49
- Label: Perspective; A&M
- Songwriter(s): Jimmy Jam & Terry Lewis; Marvin R. Pierce; Ralph Middlebrooks; Eugene Marshall Jones; Clarence Satchell; Gregory Allen Webster; Walter Junie Morrison
- Producer(s): Jimmy Jam; Terry Lewis

Sounds of Blackness singles chronology
"The Pressure Part 1" (1991)	"I Believe" (1994)	"Gloryland" (1994)

"I Believe" is a song by American vocal and instrumental ensemble Sounds of Blackness. It was produced by Jimmy Jam & Terry Lewis and was written by the duo along with: Marvin R. Pierce, Ralph Middlebrooks, Eugene Marshall Jones, Clarence Satchell, Gregory Allen Webster and Walter Junie Morrison. The song was released in 1994, by Perspective and A&M Records, as the first single from the group's third album, Africa to America; The Journey of the Drum (1994). It was a number-one hit on both the US Billboard Hot Dance Club Play chart and the UK Music Week Dance Singles chart. It samples Ohio Players 1971 recording "Pain".

== Release ==
"I Believe" was the group's sixth release to make the US Billboard soul chart, peaking at number 15, and their only Billboard Hot 100 release, where it went to number 99. It was also the group's second number on the Billboard Hot Dance Club Play chart, where it spent one week at the top. In Europe, it became a top-20 hit on the UK Singles Chart, peaking at number 17, while reaching numbers one and two on the Music Week Dance Singles chart and the Record Mirror Club Chart in the same period.

In September 1994, Ann Nesby and Gary D. Hines of Sounds of Blackness told Billboard magazine, "When we found out that "I Believe" had gone #1 on Billboard's Hot R&B Singles chart, we felt like we were going to explode. It was like heaven was smiling on us, because going #1 was additional confirmation that after 23 years, people everywhere were hearing the message and the music of the Sounds of Blackness."

== Critical reception ==
Upon the release, Larry Flick from Billboard magazine wrote, "First single from the glorious Africa to America album is awash in endless layers of uplifting harmonies, the perfect backdrop for lead singer Ann Nesby to work her incomparable magic. Shuffling funk track has a strong spiritual slant, but is not so heavy-handed that mainstream potential is dimmed. For a nifty twist, go to the David Morales remix, a roof-raising house version that will leave you positively breathless."

Andy Beevers from Music Week gave the song a score of four out of five, saying, "The Minneapolis-based gospel choir make a welcome return with another uplifting spiritual anthem. David Morales is responsible for the main club mixes which manage to match the huge power of the vocals. 'I Believe' is even more immediate than their earlier offerings and is bound to make a rapid ascent towards the top of the Club Chart. A crossover hit." James Hamilton from the Record Mirror Dance Update described it as "soaring soulful gospel" in his weekly dance column.

== Track listing ==
- CD single, UK (1994)
1. "I Believe" (Radio Mix) — 3:49
2. "I Believe" (Classic Gospel Mix) — 9:52
3. "I Believe" (Deliverance Dub) — 12:03
4. "I Believe" (Soul Believer Mix) — 5:00
5. "I Believe" (Believe In Da Quiet Storm) — 5:51

== Charts ==
=== Weekly charts ===
Weekly chart performance for "I Believe" by Sounds of Blackness
Chart (1994)	Peak position
UK Singles (OCC)	17
UK Airplay (Music Week)	31
UK Dance (Music Week)	1
UK Club Chart (Music Week)	2
US Billboard Hot 100	99
US Dance Singles Sales (Billboard)	19
US Hot Dance Club Play (Billboard)	1
US Hot R&B/Hip-Hop Songs (Billboard)	15

=== Year-end charts ===
1994 year-end chart performance for "I Believe" by Sounds of Blackness
Chart (1994)	Position
UK Club Chart (Music Week)	18
US Hot Dance Music Club/Play (Billboard)	15

== See also ==
- List of number-one dance singles of 1994 (U.S.)
