= The Evolution of Gospel =

Studio album by Sounds of Blackness
- Released: 1991
- Recorded: September 1989–January 1991
- Genres: Gospel; new jack swing
- Length: 62:19
- Labels: Perspective; A&M
- Producers: Gary Hines; Jimmy Jam and Terry Lewis

Sounds of Blackness chronology
The Evolution of Gospel (1991)	The Night Before Christmas: A Musical Fantasy (1992)

Singles from The Evolution of Gospel
- 1. "Optimistic" Released: 1991; 2. "The Pressure Pt. 1" Released: 1991; 3. "Testify" Released: 1992

The Evolution of Gospel is the debut studio album by Sounds of Blackness, released in 1991.

== Reception ==
Professional ratings
Review scores
Source	Rating
AllMusic	4/5 stars
Calgary Herald	B

In 1992, the album received the Grammy Award for "Best Gospel Choir or Chorus Album".

== Track listing ==
All tracks are written by Gary Hines, except where noted.

No.	Title	Writer(s)	Lead Vocalist(s)	Length
1.	"Chains"		Carrie Harrington	1:02
2.	"Optimistic"	Gary Hines; Jimmy Jam; Terry Lewis	Ann Bennett-Nesby; Harrington; Coré Cotton; Patricia Lacy; Jamecia Bennett	5:19
3.	"Ah Been Workin'"		Dorothy J. Townes	0:42
4.	"The Pressure Pt. 1"	Hines; Jam; Lewis	Bennett-Nesby	6:04
5.	"Testify"	Hines; Jam; Lewis	Bennett-Nesby; Andre Shepard	4:58
6.	"Gotta Be Free One Day"		Otis Montomery	0:37
7.	"Stand"	Sylvester "Sly Stone" Stewart	Bennett-Nesby; Prof. T	4:25
8.	"The Pressure Pt. 2"	Hines; Jam; Lewis	Bennett-Nesby	5:42
9.	"Your Wish Is My Command"	Tim Wortham; Hines; Tony Haynes	Bennett-Nesby	5:01
10.	"Hallelujah Lord!"	Carrie Harrington; Hines		1:44
11.	"We Give You Thanks"		Bennett-Nesby	6:16
12.	"He Holds the Future"		Bennett-Nesby; Harrington; Prof. T	5:01
13.	"What Shall I Call Him?"		Bennett-Nesby; Patricia Lacy; Elizabeth J. Turner	4:04
14.	"Better Watch Your Behavior"			1:54
15.	"Please Take My Hand"		Bennett-Nesby	4:37
16.	"I'll Fly Away"	Albert E. Brumley	Shirley Marie Graham	3:49
17.	"Harambee" (Swahili for 'Let Us All Pull Together')			1:04

== Personnel ==
=== Production ===
- Gary Hines – producer
- Jimmy Jam and Terry Lewis – executive producers, producers (tracks 2, 4–5, 8)

=== Technical ===
- Tom Berthiaume, Stuart Watson – photography
- Rowan Moore – art direction

== Chart positions ==
=== Album ===
Year	Chart	Peak
1991	The Billboard 200	#176
1991	Top Gospel Albums	#12
1991	Top R&B Albums	#4

=== Singles ===
==== "Optimistic" ====
Year	Chart	Peak
1991	Dance Music/Club Play Singles	#17
1991	Hot Dance Music Maxi-Singles Sales	#17
1991	Hot R&B/Hip-Hop Singles & Tracks	#3

==== "The Pressure Pt. 1" ====
Year	Chart	Peak
1991	Dance Music/Club Play Singles	#1
1991	Hot Dance Music Maxi-Singles Sales	#3
1991	Hot R&B/Hip-Hop Singles & Tracks	#17

==== "Testify" ====
Year	Chart	Peak
1992	Dance Music/Club Play Singles	#7
1992	Hot Dance Music Maxi-Singles Sales	#14
1992	Hot R&B/Hip-Hop Singles & Tracks	#12
