= Africa to America: The Journey of the Drum =

Studio album by Sounds of Blackness
- Released: 1994
- Genres: Gospel; R&B
- Length: 64:10
- Labels: Perspective; A&M
- Producers: Jimmy Jam and Terry Lewis; Gary Hines

Sounds of Blackness chronology
The Night Before Christmas... A Musical Fantasy (1992)	Africa to America: The Journey of the Drum (1994)	Time for Healing (1997)

Singles from Africa to America: The Journey of the Drum
- 1. "I Believe" Released: April 19, 1994

Africa to America: The Journey of the Drum is an album by vocal and instrumental ensemble Sounds of Blackness, released in 1994. It includes the singles "I'm Going All the Way", "I Believe", "Everything Is Gonna Be Alright" and "Black Butterfly".

== Critical reception ==
Professional ratings
Review scores
Source	Rating
AllMusic	4/5 stars
Los Angeles Times	3/4 stars

In a review for AllMusic, Jason Birchmeier gave the album four out of five stars, commenting that producers Jimmy Jam and Terry Lewis were "on top of their game" at the time of the album's release, and that they "brought no shortage of their trademark dense percussive rhythms" to the album. He went on to say that "even if the production sounds a little calculated and perhaps even outdated for its time, it made for some amazing songs."

Africa to America: The Journey of the Drum won Best Gospel Album at the 1995 Soul Train Music Awards.

== Singles ==
In 1993, the year before the release of the album, "I'm Going All the Way" had been released as a single in the United Kingdom, reaching No. 27 in the UK Singles Chart. In 1994, "I Believe" was released as the next single from the album, reaching No. 99 on the Billboard Hot 100 in the United States, No. 15 on Hot R&B/Hip-Hop Songs, No. 1 on Dance Club Songs and No. 17 in the UK Singles Chart. "Everything Is Gonna Be Alright" reached No. 29 on Hot R&B/Hip-Hop Songs, No. 10 on Dance Club Songs and No. 29 in the UK. "I'm Going All the Way" was re-released in the UK in early 1995, this time reaching No. 14, becoming the highest-charting Sounds of Blackness single in that country. The single also saw a release in the US, reaching No. 39 on Hot R&B/Hip-Hop Songs and No. 41 on Dance Club Songs. "Black Butterfly" reached No. 86 on Hot R&B/Hip-Hop Songs.

== Track listing ==
No.	Title	Writer(s)	Length
1.	"Hold On, Pt. 1"	Negro spiritual	1:06
2.	"I'm Going All the Way"	Ann Bennett-Nesby; Jimmy Wright	4:52
3.	"Ah Been Buked, Pt. 1"	Negro spiritual	0:41
4.	"I Believe"	James Harris III; Terry Lewis; Gregory Webster; Andrew Noland; Walter Morrison; Marshall Jones; Leroy Bonner; Ralph Middlebrook; Marvin R. Pierce; Norman Napier	4:39
5.	"Hold On, Pt. 2"	Negro spiritual	1:19
6.	"Everything Is Gonna Be Alright"	Harris; Lewis; Burt Bacharach; Hal David	4:48
7.	"Sun-Up to Sundown"	Traditional work song	0:41
8.	"The Lord Will Make a Way"	Harris; Lewis; Wright	5:09
9.	"He Took Away All My Pain"	Harris; Wright; Bennett-Nesby	4:46
10.	"A Place in My Heart"	Harris; Lewis; Bennett-Nesby; Wright	6:09
11.	"The Harder They Are the Bigger They Fall"	Harris; Lewis	4:01
12.	"The Drum (Africa to America)"	Harris; Lewis; Gary Hines; Joseph Young	2:55
13.	"African Medley: Royal Kingdom/Rise/My Native Land"	Hines; Carrie Harrington; Alecia Russell	5:55
14.	"A Very Special Love"	Billy Steele	5:21
15.	"Strange Fruit"	Lewis Allan	2:43
16.	"Black Butterfly"	Harris; Lewis	3:59
17.	"You've Taken My Blues and Gone"	Poem by Langston Hughes	0:26
18.	"Livin' the Blues"	Hines	4:13
19.	"Ah Been Buked, Pt. 2"	Negro spiritual	0:28

== Personnel ==
Adapted from AllMusic.

=== Musicians ===
- Robert Anderson – vocals
- Jamecia Bennett – background vocals
- Robin Berry – harp
- Dexter Conyers – vocals
- Core Cotton – vocals
- LaSalle Gabriel – guitar
- Shirley Marie Graham – vocals
- Trenon Graham – drums, percussion
- Carrie Harrington – vocals, background vocals
- Jayn Higgins - vocals
- Gary Hines – arranger, drum programming, keyboards, piano
- Jimmy Jam – arranger, drum programming, keyboards, synthesizer
- Geoffrey Jones – vocals
- Patricia Lacy – vocals
- Terry Lewis – arranger
- Eunique Mack – vocals
- Renee McCall – vocals, background vocals
- Ann Nesby – bass, vocal arrangement, vocals
- Kevin Pierce – guitar
- Alecia Russell – vocals
- Nate Sabin – guitar
- Larry Sims – trumpet
- James Smith – vocals
- Sounds of Blackness – instrumental, primary artist, vocals, background vocals
- Billy Steele – keyboards, vocal arrangement, vocals
- Jeff Taylor – drum programming
- Libby Turner – vocals, background vocals
- Franklin Wharton – alto sax
- Kevin Whitlock – percussion
- Stokley Williams – drums, percussion
- Louis J. Wilson – tenor sax
- Marcus Wise – tabla
- David Wright III – baritone sax
- Jimmy Wright – arranger, keyboards, organ, electric piano, synthesizer, vocals
- Rev. Joseph Young, Jr. – rap

=== Production ===
- Brian Gardner – mastering
- Gary Hines – producer
- Steve Hodge – engineer, mixing
- Jimmy Jam and Terry Lewis – executive producer, producer
- David Rideau – mixing
- Brent Rollins – artwork
- Jeff Taylor – assistant engineer

== Charts ==
Chart (1994)	Peak position
UK Albums Chart	28
US Billboard 200	109
US Top Gospel Albums	4
US Top R&B/Hip-Hop Albums	15

== Certifications ==
Region	Certification	Certified units/sales
United States (RIAA)	Gold	500,000^{^}
^{^} Shipments figures based on certification alone.
