= Optimistic (Sounds of Blackness song) =

1991 single by Sounds of Blackness

Single by Sounds of Blackness

from the album The Evolution of Gospel
- Released: 1991
- Length: 5:19
- Label: Perspective; A&M
- Songwriters: Gary Hines; Jimmy Jam; Terry Lewis
- Producers: Hines; Jam; Lewis

Sounds of Blackness singles chronology
"Optimistic" (1991)	"The Pressure Part 1" (1991)

"Optimistic" is a song by American vocal and instrumental ensemble Sounds of Blackness, recorded for their debut studio album, The Evolution of Gospel (1991). It was written and produced by Gary Hines, Jimmy Jam and Terry Lewis, and features vocals from Ann Bennett-Nesby, Carrie Harrington, Coré Cotton, Patricia Lacy, and Jamecia Bennett. The urban contemporary gospel song was released in 1991 by Perspective and A&M Records as the group's debut single and reached the top three on the US Billboard Hot R&B Singles chart. A remake by August Greene featuring Brandy was released in 2018. Jadakiss also recorded a version of the song, titling it "Keep Ya Head Up". The song was included on his first album, Kiss Tha Game Goodbye, and was featured in the 1991 film House Party 2.

== Charts ==
Chart performance for "Optimistic"
Chart (1991–1992)	Peak position
UK Singles (OCC)	45
UK Airplay (Music Week)	21
UK Dance (Music Week)	4
UK Club Chart (Record Mirror)	5
US Hot R&B/Hip-Hop Songs (Billboard)	3
US Dance Club Songs (Billboard)	17
