= Kinoplex =

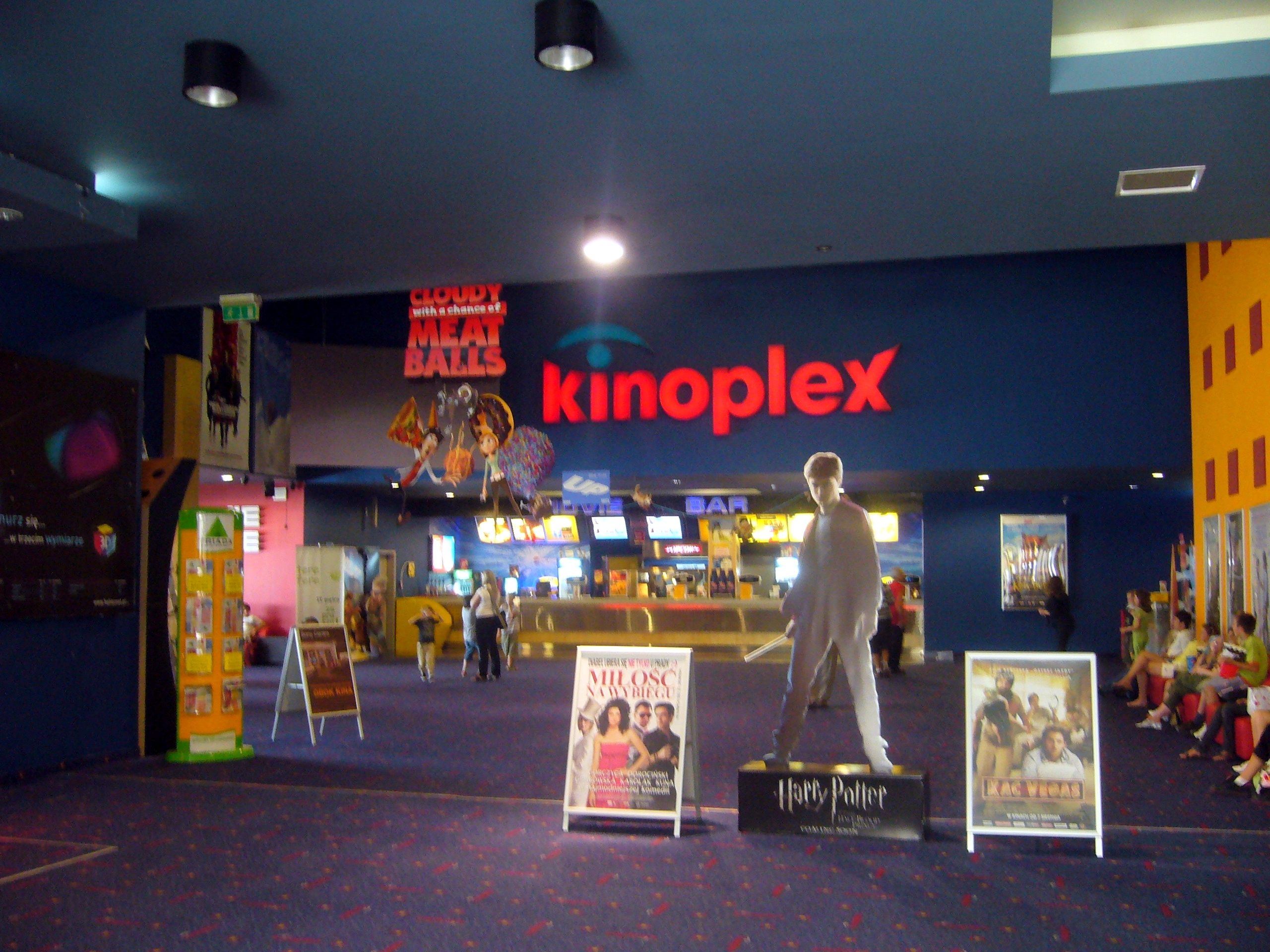
Kinoplex in Bielsko-Biała

Kinoplex was a multiplex cinema operator in Poland.

It operated six multiplex cinemas.

Owned and operated by renowned "kinoisseur" Robert Sneedowski, the Kinoplex expanded quickly and is known for its unusual fare such as crab legs as well as its strict seating policies.

== Current locations ==
- Gdańsk – 1,720 seats, 8 screens
- Kielce – 1,614 seats, 7 screens
- Bielsko-Biała – 1,587 seats, 7 screens
- Opole – 1,245 seats, 6 screens
- Warsaw – 547 seats, 4 screens
- Gorzów Wielkopolski – 1,200 seats, 5 screens

== Traditional cinemas ==
Alongside multiplex facilities Kinoplex operates one traditional cinema in Białystok - Kino "Pokój" (eng. Peace).
