= Sounds of Blackness =

American musical group

- Origin: Minneapolis/St. Paul, Minnesota, United States
- Genres: Gospel; R&B; soul
- Years active: 1969–present
- Labels: Perspective Records; A&M Records; Zinc Records; Atomic K Records; Malaco Music Group
- Past members: Robert J. Jones; Ann Nesby; James "Big Jim" Wright (deceased)
- Website: soundsofblackness.org

Sounds of Blackness is a vocal and instrumental ensemble from Minneapolis/St. Paul, Minnesota who perform music from several genres music including gospel, R&B, soul, and jazz. The group scored several hits on the Billboard R&B and Hot Dance Music/Club Play charts in the 1990s. Cynthia Johnson of Lipps Inc. and Ann Nesby are the group's most prominent alumni.

== History ==
=== Origins ===
The group was founded in 1969 by Russell Knighton at Macalester College in St. Paul, Minnesota, and the group was called the Macalester College Black Voices. It was in 1971 when current director Gary Hines took leadership over the ensemble, and the group name was officially changed to Sounds of Blackness.

Sounds of Blackness group could have originated from the Boulder Colorado Afro-American Student Association Bi-Weekly newsletter with the same name, published from 1968 till mid 1970s. It's editor was Charles Wartts, Jr.

The chief lead singer of the group was Ann Nesby until 1995 when Nesby left the group to pursue a solo career. The group continues to perform internationally. The group performed the original songs for the 2000 Disney animated short John Henry (based on the folklore character) as part of Disney's American Legends, the short was re-released in 2015 as part of the Walt Disney Animation Studios Short Films Collection. The original songs were written by Gary Hines and Billy Steele, with a score by Stephen James Taylor.

On September 30, 2018, group member James "Big Jim" Wright was found dead at his home in Rockford, Illinois. Outside of Sounds of Blackness, Wright was best known as a frequent collaborator of Jimmy Jam and Terry Lewis and an in-house producer for their company, Flyte Tyme Productions.

== Awards and honors ==
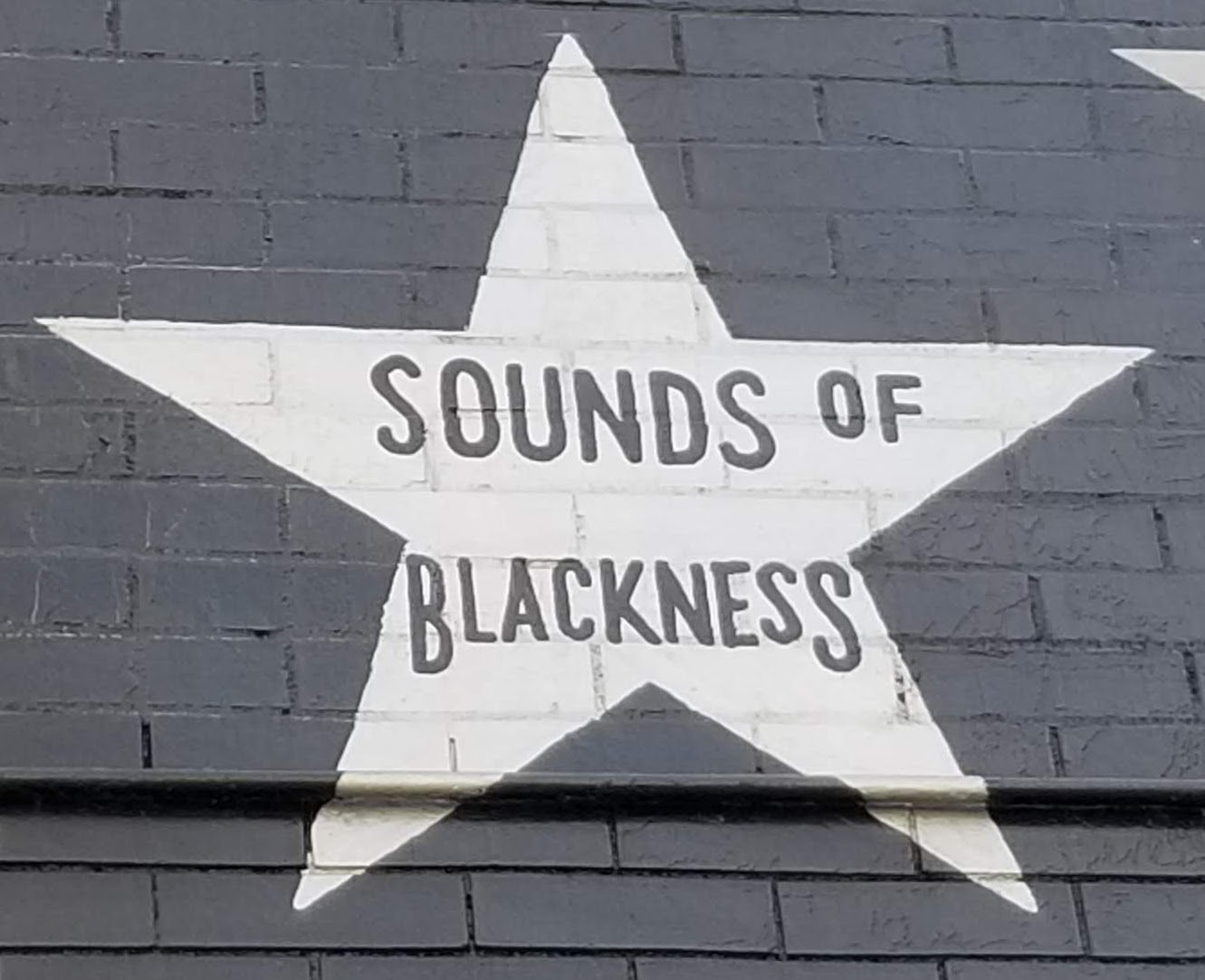
Star honoring Sounds of Blackness on the outside mural of the Minneapolis nightclub First Avenue

The group has received three Grammy Awards, four Stellar Awards, one Emmy nomination, the International Time for Peace Award, the International Dance Music Award, five NAACP Image Award nominations and 1 NAACP Image Award.

Sounds of Blackness's "Time For Love" was nominated for the 7th Annual Independent Music Awards for R&B Song of the year.

Sounds of Blackness has been honored with a star on the outside mural of the Minneapolis nightclub First Avenue, recognizing performers that have played sold-out shows or have otherwise demonstrated a major contribution to the culture at the iconic venue. Receiving a star "might be the most prestigious public honor an artist can receive in Minneapolis," according to journalist Steve Marsh.

== Members ==
Vocalists and instrumentalists, past and present (partial list):

=== Current members ===
- Taylor Grate
- Ronnie Allen
- Melissa Belfrey
- Jayn Bell
- Jamecia Bennett
- Kadejsha Kibble
- Michael Bowens
- Kimberly Brown
- Quintin Brown
- Salimah Bryant
- Ashley Commodore
- Nneka Constantino
- Charles Cooley
- Core Cotton
- Ayenna Davis
- Tim Davis
- Bridget Dawkins
- Amy Petersen Demps
- Doriel Demps
- Steve Dinkins
- Melody Doyle
- Robert Edwards
- Rodney Fair
- Graydon Francis
- Elwyn Fraser Jr.
- Terrence Frierson
- Lacie Glasper
- Marie Graham
- Alecia Russell-Hammonds
- Reginald Haney
- Carrie Harrington
- Sandy Harris
- Angela Henderson
- Quan Howell
- David Hurst
- Dr. Robert Jones
- Chreese Jones
- Geoff Jones
- Len Jones
- Alexandra King
- Russell Knighton
- Patricia Lacy
- Timothy W. Lee
- Wanda Lewis
- Yulanda Lunn
- Ann Nesby
- Chanel Perry
- Carl Pertile
- Tasha Prince
- Cheryl Reeves
- Charles Robinson
- Greg Sears
- Cydni Shepard
- Lynnette Simpson
- Mike Smith
- Aaron Keith Stewart
- Dorothy "DT" Townes
- Andrea Tribitt
- Libby Turner
- Victoria Udeh
- Anthony Valentino
- Tamika Wade
- Jennifer L J Whitlock
- Freddie Winston
- David Young

=== Instrumentalists ===
- Daryl Boudreaux - Percussion
- Brandon Commodore - Drums
- Trenon Graham - Drums
- Gary Hines - Music Director & Keyboards
- Paul Johnson - Bass
- Jeanine McAdams - Keyboards
- Deevo Dee - Guitar
- Juan Navarro - Trombone
- Larry Robinson - Drums
- Larry Sims - Trumpet
- Louis James Wilson - Tenor Saxophone
- Billy Steele - Assistant Director & Keyboards
- David Wright III - Baritone Saxophone & Flute
- Frank Wharton - Alto Saxophone
- Kevin Whitlock - Congas/Percussion
- Solomon Parham - Trumpet

=== Former members ===
- Taylor Grate
- Sheryl Adams
- Gregory Adams
- Diane Beckley
- Rochelle Graves Berry
- Turan Bey
- Assata Brown
- Dorothy Brown
- Gordon Bruce
- Keith Bushnell
- Mike Scott - Guitar
- Ethylon Butler
- Demetria (Jones) Carter
- Dara Ceaser
- Roger Clarke
- Ginger Commodore
- Rita Commodore
- Robert Commodore
- Pat (Webster) Foreman
- Theo Foreman
- W.D. Foster
- Solomon Hughes - Guitar
- LaSalle Gabriel
- Michael Graham
- Kelli Hickman
- Wendy Ingram
- Deborah Keyes
- Kenneth Land
- Joyce (Manuel) Lockhart
- Cynthia Johnson
- JoAnn (Hollies) Johnson
- David E. Jones
- Bev Mahto
- Renee McCall
- Rufus McClean
- Valarie (Johnson) McCullar
- Tim McWatt
- Shelly (White) McWatt
- Otis Montgomery
- Judy Peterson
- Valerie Phillips
- Dorothy "Dot" Shelby
- Audrey Smith
- William "Bill" Colquitt
- Eugene Stump
- Craig "Rojeem" Taylor
- Bob Thomas
- Tim Thompson
- Roderick Wade
- Christopher L. Walker
- Gennise (Jones) Wilson
- Richard Wilson
- James "Big Jim" Wright
- Joe Young Jr

== Discography ==
=== Studio albums ===
- The Evolution of Gospel (Perspective, 1991)
- The Night Before Christmas... A Musical Fantasy (Perspective, 1992)
- Africa to America: The Journey of the Drum (Perspective, 1994)
- Time For Healing (Perspective, 1997)
- Reconciliation (Zinc, 1999)
- Soul Symphony (Sounds Of Blackness, 2002)
- The Night Before Christmas II (Atomic K, 2004)
- Unity (SLR/Lightyear, 2005)
- Kings & Queens - Message Music From The Movement (P-Vine, 2007)
- The 3rd Gift - Story, Song & Spirit (CC Entertainment, 2009)
- The Sounds of Blackness (Atomic K, 2011)

=== Compilations ===
- Journey of the Drum Remix Collection (Perspective, 1995)
- The Very Best of Sounds of Blackness (A&M, 2001)
- The Collection (Spectrum, 2003)
- The Best of Sounds of Blackness – The Millennium Collection (20th Century Masters) (A&M, 2007)

=== Other appearances ===
- Mo’ Money: Original Motion Picture Soundtrack ("Joy") (Perspective, 1992)
- When Jesus Left Birmingham by John Mellencamp bonus track on 2005 re-issue of his album Human Wheels
- A Tribute to Curtis Mayfield ("Amen" with Elton John) (Warner Bros., 1994)
- Soccer Rocks the Globe: World Cup USA 94 ("Gloryland" with Daryl Hall) (Mercury Records, 1994)
- Inner City Blues: The Music of Marvin Gaye ("God Is Love"/"Mercy Mercy Me") (Motown Records, 1995)
- Songs from Whistle Down the Wind ("Vaults of Heaven" with Tom Jones, "Wrestle With the Devil") (Really Useful Records, 1998)
- Power of Soul: A Tribute to Jimi Hendrix (Image Entertainment, 2004)
- Jam & Lewis: Volume One (BMG, 2021)

=== Singles ===
Year	Single	Peak chart positions						Album
Year	Single	US	US R&B/Hip-Hop	US Dance	US Gospel	SWI	UK	Album
1991	"Optimistic"	—	3	17	—	—	45	The Evolution of Gospel
1991	"The Pressure Part 1"	—	16	1	—	—	71	The Evolution of Gospel
1992	"Testify" (US only)	—	12	7	—	—	—	The Evolution of Gospel
1992	"Optimistic / Testify" (UK only)	—	—	—	—	—	28	The Evolution of Gospel
1992	"Pressure (Pt. 1) (CJ Mackintosh Remix)" (UK only)	—	—	—	—	—	49	The Evolution of Gospel
1992	"Joy" (US only)	—	—	27	—	—	—	Mo' Money OST
1992	"Soul Holidays / Joy" (UK only)	—	—	—	—	—	79	The Night Before Christmas – A Musical Fantasy
1993	"I'm Going All the Way" (UK only)	—	—	—	—	—	27	Africa to America: The Journey of the Drum
1994	"I Believe"	99	15	1	—	—	17	Africa to America: The Journey of the Drum
1994	"Gloryland" (with Daryl Hall)	—	—	—	—	37	36	Official Theme Song Of World Cup USA 94
1994	"Everything Is Gonna Be Alright"	—	29	10	—	—	29	Africa to America: The Journey of the Drum
1994	"Everything Is Gonna Be Alright (remix)"	—	39	41	—	—	—	Africa to America: The Journey of the Drum
1995	"I'm Going All the Way" (UK only)	—	—	—	—	—	14	Africa to America: The Journey of the Drum
1995	"Black Butterfly" (US only)	—	86	—	—	—	—	Africa to America: The Journey of the Drum
1996	"Children of the World"	—	90	19	—	—	141	People: A Musical Celebration of Diversity OST
1997	"Spirit"	—	29	—	—	—	35	Time for Healing
1998	"The Pressure (new remixes)" (UK only)	—	—	—	—	—	46	single only
1998	"Try"	—	—	—	—	—	—	Reconciliation
2005	"Unity"	—	—	—	29	—	—	Unity
2011	"Fly Again"	—	93	—	22	—	—	The Sounds of Blackness
"—" denotes releases that did not chart or were not released.

== See also ==
- Grammy Awards of 1992
- List of number-one dance hits (United States)
- List of artists who reached number one on the US Dance chart
