= The Pressure Part 1 =

Single by Sounds of Blackness

from the album The Evolution of Gospel
- Released: 1991
- Genre: Urban contemporary gospel; spirituals; R&B
- Length: 4:41
- Label: A&M
- Songwriters: James Harris III; Terry Lewis; Gary Hines
- Producers: James Harris III, Terry Lewis; Gary Hines

Sounds of Blackness singles chronology
"Optimistic" (1991)	"The Pressure Part 1" (1991)	"Testify" (1992)

"The Pressure Part 1" is a song by American recording artist group Sounds of Blackness, released in 1991 by A&M Records as the second single from their debut album, The Evolution of Gospel (1991). The track was written by Gary Hines, James Samuel Harris III (better known as Jimmy Jam) and Terry Lewis. "The Pressure Part 1" was the group's second release to make the US R&B singles chart where it peaked at number 16. The single was also the first of two number ones on the Billboard US dance chart. "The Pressure" was selected as one of the "100 Top Dance Songs" by Slant Magazine. It was also featured in the 1996 Walt Disney Pictures movie First Kid.

== Legacy ==
In 2020, Slant Magazine ranked the classic 12" mix of "The Pressure" as one of the "100 Top Dance Songs", writing, "Outfitting the 40-person choir's caterwauls with a frenetic bassline, giant four-on-the-floor beats and hip-house rattling, Knuckles could have blown the stained glass out of a church and make it seem like an act of God." In 2022, musician Model Man (a.k.a. Mark Brandon) ranked it number one on his "The 10 Best Piano Dance Tracks" in DMY, adding, "The intro alone is special. Really love how free and expressive the piano is on this track. This was one of the catalyst songs that opened the door to me into the world of Chicago house."

== Charts ==
Chart (1991–1992)	Peak position
UK Singles (OCC)	71
UK Dance (Music Week)	9
UK Club Chart (Music Week)	2
US Hot R&B Songs (Billboard)	16
US Hot Dance Club Play (Billboard)	1

== See also ==
- List of number-one dance singles of 1991 (U.S.)
