= Mint Condition discography =

This is the discography of Mint Condition.

== Albums ==
=== Studio albums ===
Year	Title	Peak chart positions				Certifications	Label
Year	Title	US	US R&B	US IND	US HOL	Certifications	Label
1991	Meant to Be Mint	63	13	—	—		Perspective
1993	From the Mint Factory	104	18	—	—		Perspective
1996	Definition of a Band	76	13	—	—	RIAA: Gold	Perspective
1999	Life's Aquarium	64	7	—	—		Elektra
2005	Livin' the Luxury Brown	45	11	1	—		Image
2008	E-Life	119	8	12	—		Image/Caged Bird
2011	7...	33	12	7	—		Shanachie
2012	Music @ the Speed of Life	60	9	15	—		Shanachie
2015	Healing Season	—	—	—	27		Mint Condition
"—" denotes releases that did not chart or were not released in that territory.

=== Compilation albums ===
Year	Title	Chart positions		Label
Year	Title	US Pop	US R&B	Label
1998	The Collection: 1991-1998	—	78	Perspective
2006	20th Century Masters: The Best of Mint Condition	—	—	Hip-O

=== Live albums ===
Year	Title	Chart positions	
Year	Title	US R&B	US IND
2006	Live from the 9:30 Club	61	46

== Singles ==
Year	Title	Peak chart positions				Certifications	Album
Year	Title	US	US R&B	US Adult R&B	UK	Certifications	Album
1991	"Are You Free"	—	55	—	—		Meant to Be Mint
1992	"Breakin' My Heart (Pretty Brown Eyes)"	6	3	—	—	RIAA: Gold	Meant to Be Mint
1992	"Forever in Your Eyes"	81	7	—	—		Meant to Be Mint
1993	"Nobody Does It Betta"	—	45	33	—		From the Mint Factory
1993	"U Send Me Swingin'"	33	2	1	—		From the Mint Factory
1994	"Someone to Love"	—	28	—	—		From the Mint Factory
1994	"So Fine"	—	29	32	—		From the Mint Factory
1996	"What Kind of Man Would I Be?"	17	2	1	38	RIAA: Gold	Definition of a Band
1997	"You Don't Have to Hurt No More"	32	10	—	—		Definition of a Band
1997	"Let Me Be the One"	—	70	25	63		Definition of a Band
1999	"If You Love Me"	30	5	—	—		Life's Aquarium
2000	"Is This Pain Our Pleasure?"	—	42	27	—		Life's Aquarium
2005	"Whoaa"	—	—	18	—		Livin' the Luxury Brown
2005	"I'm Ready"	—	49	7	—		Livin' the Luxury Brown
2008	"Baby Boy, Baby Girl"	—	—	25	—		E-Life
2008	"Nothing Left to Say"	—	27	4	—		E-Life
2011	"Caught My Eye"	—	51	13	—		7
2011	"Not My Daddy" (with Kelly Price)	—	22	—	—		7
2011	"Walk On"	—	—	19	—		7
2012	"Believe in Us"	—	64	11	—		Music @ the Speed of Life
2015	"Healing Season"	—	—	27	—		Healing Season
"—" denotes releases that did not chart or were not released in that territory.
