= Adina Howard discography =

- Studio albums: 5
- EPs: 1
- Singles: 14

American R&B singer Adina Howard has released five studio albums, fourteen singles and ten music videos.

== Studio albums ==
Title	Album details	Peak chart positions		Certifications
Title	Album details	US	US R&B	Certifications
Do You Wanna Ride?	Released: February 28, 1995; Label: Mecca Don/EastWest Records; Format: CD, cassette, digital download	39	7	RIAA: Gold
Welcome to Fantasy Island	Released: July 29, 1997 (Shelved) February 19, 2021 (Digital); Label: Elektra Records/Rhino Records; Format: CD, digital download	TBR		
The Second Coming	Released: April 6, 2004; Label: Rufftown Records; Format: CD, digital download	—	61	
Private Show	Released: June 26, 2007; Label: Arsenal Records; Format: CD, digital download	—	—	
Resurrection	Released: April 14, 2017 March 9, 2018 (Re-Release); Label: Indelible Enterprises; Format: CD, digital download	—	—	

=== EPs ===
- 2017: Freaky

=== Mixtapes ===
- 2005: Let You Hit
- 2013: Welcome to Fantasy Island
- 2016: The Official "Resurrection" Mixtape Starring Adina Howard

== Singles ==
Year	Title	US	US R&B	UK	Album	Certifications
1995	"Freak like Me"	2	2	33	Do You Wanna Ride?	RIAA: Platinum
1995	"My Up and Down"	68	32	—	Do You Wanna Ride?	
1995	"It's All About You"	—	58	—	Do You Wanna Ride?	
1997	"(Freak) And U Know It"	70	32	—	Welcome to Fantasy Island	
1997	"T-Shirt & Panties" (with Jamie Foxx)	—	—	—	Woo Soundtrack	
2003	"Nasty Grind"	—	95	—	The Second Coming	
2007	"L.O.V.A."	—	—	—	Private Show	
2007	"Hips"	—	—	—	Private Show	
2013	"Switch"	—	—	—	Non-album singles	
2015	"Bad 4 Me"	—	—	—	Non-album singles	
2017	"Blasphemy" (featuring King Gas)	—	—	—	Resurrection	
2018	"Nasty"	—	—	—	Resurrection	
2020	"Mind Reader" (with Opolopo)	—	—	—	Non-album singles	
2022	"Keep Lookin"	—	—	—	Non-album singles	
2024	"Time Will Tell"	—	—	—	Non-album singles	
2025	"I Overstand"	—	—	—	Non-album singles	

=== As featured performer ===
List of singles as lead artist, with selected chart positions and certifications, showing year released and album name
Title	Year	Peak chart positions										Certifications	Album
Title	Year	US	US R&B	US Rap	AUS	FRA	GER	NZ	SWE	SWI	UK	Certifications	Album
"What's Love Got to Do with It" (with Warren G)	1996	32	36	5	2	9	3	1	2	6	2	ARIA: Platinum; BPI: Gold; BVMI: Gold	Supercop soundtrack
"Chocolate (Cuties & Condoms)" (with Cydal)	1997	—	—	—	—	—	—	—	—	—	—		Bulletproof soundtrack/Cydalwayz
"Freaks" (with Play-n-Skillz featuring Krayzie Bone)	2004	69	52	24	—	—	—	—	—	—	—		The Process

=== Videography ===
Year	Title	Director
1995	"Freak Like Me"	Hype Williams
1995	"Freak Like Me (Slow Wind Remix)"	
1995	"My Up and Down"	Marty Callner
1995	"It's All About You"	ABoyNamedFuture
1996	"What's Love Got to Do with It?" (with Warren G)	Joseph Kahn
1997	"(Freak) And U Know It"	Francis Lawrence
2003	"Nasty Grind"	
2017	"Blasphemy"	Nikki Allen
2020	"Mind Reader (Lyric Video)"	
2022	"Keep Lookin'"	Dre Paiid
2025	"Time Will Tell"	Jamezz Hampton
