= Nobody Does It Better (disambiguation) =

"Nobody Does It Better" is a 1977 song by Carly Simon.

Nobody Does It Better may also refer to:

- Nobody Does It Better (album), a 1996 album by Gina Thompson
- Nobody Does It Better, a novel in the Gossip Girl series
- "Nobody Does It Betta", a 1993 song by Mint Condition
- "Nobody Does It Better" (Nate Dogg song), featuring Warren G, 1998
- "Nobody Do It Better", a song by Keith Murray from the 2007 album Rap-Murr-Phobia (The Fear of Real Hip-Hop)
- "Nobody Does It Better" (Knight Rider), a 1983 television episode

== See also ==
- No One Does It Better (disambiguation)
