= Private Show =

A sex show is a form of live performance that features performers engaging in sexual activity.

Private Show may also refer to:

- Private Show (album), 2007 album by Adina Howard
- "Private Show" (Britney Spears song), song by Britney Spears from her album Glory
  - Private Show (fragrance), a Britney Spears fragrance
- "Private Show" (T.I. song), song by T.I. featuring Chris Brown from the album Paperwork
- "Private Show", song by Little Mix from the album Glory Days
- "Private Show", song by Pink from the album Can't Take Me Home
