= The Floor (song) =

1993 single by Johnny Gill

Single by Johnny Gill

from the album Provocative
- Released: May 4, 1993
- Genre: Dance; funk
- Length: 5:13
- Label: Motown
- Songwriters: James Harris III; Terry Lewis
- Producers: Jimmy Jam and Terry Lewis

Johnny Gill singles chronology
"There U Go" (1992)	"The Floor" (1993)	"I Got You" (1993)

Audio
- "The Floor" on YouTube

"The Floor" is a song by American singer-songwriter Johnny Gill from his fourth studio album, Provocative (1993). The track, a dance and funk song, was written and produced by Jimmy Jam and Terry Lewis and was released as the lead single from Provocative on May 4, 1993, through the Motown label. American band Mint Condition performs the "floor" chants on the song, with member Stokley providing additional background vocals.

Upon its release, "The Floor" peaked at number 56 on the US Billboard Hot 100 chart and became a top-40 hit in Australia and New Zealand. In Australia, it was certified gold for shipping over 35,000 copies. The song's music video, directed by English video director Julien Temple, features Gill and his backup dancers on a smoky dance floor built like a trampoline.

== Chart performance ==
"The Floor" debuted on the US Billboard Hot 100 on May 22, 1993, as that week's "Hot Shot Debut". Four weeks later, on June 19, the song peaked at number 56. It became a top-20 hit on the Billboard Hot R&B Singles chart, reaching number 11, and also appeared on two other Billboard rankings: the Top 40/Rhythm-Crossover chart (number 32) and the Maxi-Singles Sales chart (number 49). On the Canadian RPM Dance chart, the song peaked at number eight for two weeks.

Outside North America, "The Floor" charted in Australia, the Netherlands, New Zealand, and the United Kingdom. It spent a single week on the UK Singles Chart at number 53 and reached number 45 in the Netherlands, where it charted for three weeks. In New Zealand, the song debuted at number 34 on July 18, 1993, and peaked at number 29 during its fourth of five weeks on the RIANZ Singles Chart. It charted the highest in Australia, where it logged 23 weeks on the ARIA Singles Chart, reaching number six on October 10, 1993. It was Australia's 29th-most-successful single of 1993 and was certified gold by the Australian Recording Industry Association (ARIA) for shipping over 35,000 copies.

== Music video ==
English director Julien Temple directed the accompanying music video for "The Floor" and filmed it in May 1993. It was choreographed by Michael Brown and Taco. The video features Gill and many backup dancers dancing on a foggy, multitiered dance floor with a built-in trampoline. According to Temple, he wanted the video to go along with the songs lyrics by "exploring the floor". Gill, who was 27 at the time of filming, was not in prime condition to perform the acrobatic moves in the video and spent most of his time with a masseuse who tended to his injuries.

== Track listings ==
- US cassette single and Japanese mini-CD single
1. "The Floor" (LP version)
2. "Tell Me How You Want It" (snippet)
3. "Long Way from Home" (snippet)
4. "I Got You" (snippet)
5. "Quiet Time to Play" (snippet)
6. "I Know Where I Stand" (snippet)
- UK 7-inch and cassette single; Australian cassette single
1. "The Floor" (pop edit 1)
2. "The Floor" (LP version)
- UK CD and 12-inch single; Australian CD single
1. "The Floor" (pop edit 1)
2. "The Floor" (Flyte Tyme edit)
3. "The Floor" (LP version)
4. "The Floor" (R&B edit)
5. "The Floor" (instrumental)

== Personnel ==
Personnel are adapted from the US cassette single sleeve.

- James Harris III – writing, production
- Terry Lewis – writing, background vocals, production
- Johnny Gill – vocals, background vocals
- Stockley – background vocals
- Mint Condition – "floor" chants
- Jheryl Busby – executive production

== Charts ==
=== Weekly charts ===
Chart (1993)	Peak position
Australia (ARIA)	6
Canada Retail Singles (The Record)	7
Canada Dance/Urban (RPM)	8
Netherlands (Dutch Top 40 Tipparade)	2
Netherlands (Single Top 100)	45
New Zealand (Recorded Music NZ)	29
UK Singles (Official Charts)	53
US Billboard Hot 100	56
US Hot R&B Singles (Billboard)	11
US Maxi-Singles Sales (Billboard)	49
US Top 40/Rhythm-Crossover (Billboard)	32
US Cash Box Top 100	53

=== Year-end charts ===
Chart (1993)	Position
Australia (ARIA)	29
US Hot R&B Singles (Billboard)	85

== Certifications ==
Region	Certification	Certified units/sales
Australia (ARIA)	Gold	35,000^{^}
^{^} Shipments figures based on certification alone.

== Release history ==
Region	Date	Format(s)	Label(s)	Ref.
United States	May 4, 1993	Cassette	Motown	
Japan	June 10, 1993	Mini-CD	Motown	
Australia	July 5, 1993	CD; cassette	Motown; Polydor	
United Kingdom	July 5, 1993	7-inch vinyl; 12-inch vinyl; CD; cassette	Motown	
