= Woo (soundtrack) =

Music from the Motion Picture Woo

Soundtrack album by various artists
- Released: May 5, 1998
- Recorded: 1997–1998
- Genre: Hip hop; R&B
- Length: 74:03
- Label: Untertainment; Epic
- Producer: Ant Banks; Billy Moss; Charly "Suga Bear" Charles; Chico DeBarge; Clark Kent; Cory Rooney; Dame Grease; Darrell "Digga" Branch; Gerald Baillergeau; Heavy D; Jamie Foxx; Joey Elias; Jon-John Robinson; Keri Lewis; Mo-Suave-A; Mr. Sexxx; Nichole Gilbert; Rhett Lawrence; Robert "Shim" Kirkland; Ron "Amen-Ra" Lawrence; Sonny B.; Stokley Williams; Timothy Riley; Tony Dofat; Trackmasters; Victor Merritt; Warren G

Singles from Woo
- 1. "T-Shirt & Panties" Released: May 5, 1998; 2. "Money" Released: 1998; 3. "Nobody Does It Better" Released: June 23, 1998; 4. "357" Released: 1998; 5. "If You Love Me" Released: October 19, 1999

Professional ratings
Review scores
Source	Rating
AllMusic	2/5 stars

Music from the Motion Picture Woo is the soundtrack to Daisy von Scherler Mayer's 1998 comedy film Woo. It was released on May 5, 1998 through Epic Records and consisted of hip hop and R&B music. The soundtrack was a moderate success, peaking at 52 on the Billboard 200 and 8 on the Top R&B/Hip-Hop Albums and featured three charting singles Charli Baltimore's "Money", which went to #50 on the Hot Rap Singles, Nate Dogg and Warren G's "Nobody Does It Better" and Cam'ron's "357".

== Track listing ==
Music from the Motion Picture Woo track listing
No.	Title	Writer(s)	Producer(s)	Length
1.	"Woo Woo (Freak Out)" (performed by MC Lyte and Nicci Gilbert)	Lana Moorer; Nicci Gilbert; Ron Lawrence; Giovanni Salah	Ron "Amen-Ra" Lawrence; Sprague "Doogie" Williams (co.)	3:36
2.	"Money" (performed by Charli Baltimore)	Tiffany Lane; Kenneth Gamble; Leon Huff; Anthony Jackson	DJ Clark Kent	3:44
3.	"Bouncin'" (performed by Lost Boyz)	Terrance Kelly; Garfield Duncan	Mr. Sexxx	4:20
4.	"Nobody Does It Better" (performed by Nate Dogg & Warren G)	Nathaniel Hale; Warren Griffin III	Warren G	4:53
5.	"Get'n It On" (performed by Mona Lisa)	Jon-John Robinson; Joey Elias	Jon-John Robinson; Joey Elias	4:25
6.	"If You Love Me" (performed by Stokley Williams)	Keri Lewis; Stokley Williams	Keri Lewis; Stokley Williams	4:23
7.	"T-Shirt & Panties" (performed by Adina Howard & Jamie Foxx)	Eric Marlon Bishop; Billy Moss	Billy Moss; Jamie Foxx	4:50
8.	"Niggaz Done Started Something" (performed by DMX, The Lox & Ma$e)	Earl Simmons; Jason Phillips; Sean Jacobs; David Styles; Mason Betha; Damon Blackman	Dame Grease	4:55
9.	"J-A-N-E Meets N.O.R.E." (performed by Jane Blaze & Noreaga)	T. Knight-Williams; Victor Santiago; Charly Charles; S. Wallace	Charly "Suga Bear" Charles; Robert 'Shim' Kirkland	3:50
10.	"357" (performed by Cam'ron)	Cameron Giles; Darrell Branch	Darrell "Digga" Branch	3:24
11.	"Let It Be" (performed by Allure & 50 Cent)	Billy Lawrence; Jean-Claude Olivier; Samuel Barnes; Cory Rooney; Timothy Riley	Poke & Tone; Cory Rooney; Timothy "Tyme" Riley	4:09
12.	"Take a Ride" (performed by Heavy D & McGruff)	Dwight Myers; Herbert Brown	Tony Dofat; Heavy D	4:29
13.	"I Will" (performed by Simone Hines)	James Everett Lawrence; J. Butler	Rhett Lawrence	3:39
14.	"Superman" (performed by Chico DeBarge)	Jonathan Arthur DeBarge	Chico DeBarge	4:12
15.	"Searching (For Your Love)" (performed by Brownstone)	Gerald Baillergeau; Nichole Gilbert; Victor Merritt	Big Yam; Nichole Gilbert; Vino	4:36
16.	"Drama in My Life" (performed by 8Ball & Psycho Drama)	Premro Smith; Akula Segal; Jeffrey Robinson; T. Jones	Mo-Suave-A	5:28
17.	"I Know You Love Her" (performed by Too $hort & Slink Capone)	Todd Shaw; Anthony Banks; G. Johnson	Ant Banks; Sonny B.	5:10
Total length:				74:03
