= Provocative (album) =

Studio album by Johnny Gill
- Released: June 8, 1993
- Recorded: 1992–1993
- Studios: Flyte Tyme Studios (Edina, Minnesota); Studio LaCoCo; Doppler Studios (Atlanta, Georgia); Elumba Recording Studios (Los Angeles, California); Studio 4 (Philadelphia, Pennsylvania)
- Genres: R&B; new jack swing; soul
- Length: 47:43 (US version); 63:15 (UK version)
- Label: Motown
- Producers: Jimmy Jam & Terry Lewis; Babyface and L.A. Reid; Boyz II Men; Daryl Simmons and Kayo

Johnny Gill chronology
Johnny Gill (1990)	Provocative (1993)	Let's Get the Mood Right (1996)

Provocative is the fourth album by American R&B recording artist Johnny Gill. It was his second album for Motown Records and fourth album overall.

Three singles were released from the album with music videos. The first single, "The Floor", was accompanied by a music video directed by Julien Temple. Temple previously directed the music video "Fairweather Friend" from Gill's previous album. The second single "I Got You" was directed by Sanji. The video for the third single "Long Way From Home" was directed by Wayne Isham.

Provocative was certified Gold by the RIAA on August 11, 1993. The most successful single from the album was "The Floor", which peaked at number six in Australia, reached number 56 on the US Billboard Hot 100, and charted within the top 50 in the Netherlands and New Zealand.

== Track listing ==
Provocative
No.	Title	Writer(s)	Producer(s)	Length
1.	"Provocative"	James Harris III; Terry Lewis	Jimmy Jam & Terry Lewis	4:32
2.	"The Floor"	Harris III; Lewis	Jimmy Jam & Terry Lewis	5:13
3.	"Where No Man Has Gone Before"	Harris III; Lewis	Jimmy Jam & Terry Lewis	4:59
4.	"I Got You"	Wanya Morris; Shawn Stockman; Nathan Morris; Herb Rooney	Morris; Stockman; Morris; Michael McCary ^{[a]}	4:16
5.	"A Cute, Sweet, Love Addiction"	Harris III; Lewis; Jack Daniels; Bonnie Thompson	Jimmy Jam & Terry Lewis	3:59
6.	"Long Way From Home"	Antonio "L.A." Reid; Kenneth "Babyface" Edmonds; Daryl Simmons	Reid; Edmonds; Simmons	4:40
7.	"Tell Me How U Want It"	Edmonds; Simmons	Kevin "Kayo" Roberson; Simmons	4:51
8.	"Mastersuite"	Harris III; Lewis; James Todd Smith; Gill	Jimmy Jam & Terry Lewis	4:46
9.	"Quiet Time To Play"	Harris III; Lewis	Jimmy Jam & Terry Lewis	4:48
10.	"I Know Where I Stand"	Harris III; Lewis; Karyn White; Billy Steele	Jimmy Jam & Terry Lewis	5:41
11.	"There U Go"	Reid; Edmonds; Simmons	Reid; Edmonds; Simmons	5:16
12.	"Let's Just Run Away"	Harris III; Lewis; Lance Alexander; Tony Tolbert; George Duke	Jimmy Jam & Terry Lewis; Lance Alexander; prof. t	5:15
Total length:				63:15

Notes

- ^{^a} signifies a co-producer
- "I Got You" contains a drum sample of "Synthetic Substitution", written by Herb Rooney, and performed by Melvin Bliss.
- "A Cute, Sweet, Love Addiction" contains an element of "Turn Back the Hands of Time", written by Jack Daniels and Bonnie Thompson, and performed by Tyrone Davis.

== Personnel ==
Credits adapted from liner notes, Discogs and Allmusic.

- Jimmy Jam, Babyface, Nathan Morris, Daryl Simmons, McKinley Horton - keyboards
- Jimmy Jam, L.A. Reid, Nathan Morris, Daryl Simmons - drum programming
- Stokley Williams - drums
- Kayo, Johnny Crooms - bass
- Terry Lewis, Stokley Williams - percussion
- Billy Steele - piano
- Karyn White, Lisa Keith, Mint Condition, Babyface, Marc Nelson, Alexandra Brown, Jamecia Bennett, Pamela Copeland, Nycolia "Tye-V" Turman, Nathan Morris, Shawn Stockman, Wanya Morris - backing vocals

Technical

- Recording engineer: Steve Hodge, Dave Rideau, Jim Zumpano, Donnell Sullivan, Brad Gilderman, Thom Kidd, Phil Tan
- Mixing: Steve Hodge, Dave Rideau, Barney Perkins, Dave Way
- Mastering: Bernie Grundman Mastering
- Photography: Pamela Springsteen
- Art Direction: Jonathan Clark
- Design: Emilie Burnham

== Charts ==
=== Weekly charts ===
Weekly chart performance for Provocative
Chart (1993)	Peak position
Australian Albums (ARIA)	31
Canada Top Albums/CDs (RPM)	36
Dutch Albums (Album Top 100)	64
UK Albums (Official Charts)	42
US Billboard 200	14
US Top R&B/Hip-Hop Albums (Billboard)	4

=== Year-end charts ===
Year-end chart performance for Provocative
Chart (1993)	Position
US Top R&B/Hip-Hop Albums (Billboard)	45

== Certifications ==
Region	Certification	Certified units/sales
United States (RIAA)	Gold	500,000^{^}
^{^} Shipments figures based on certification alone.
