= (Freak) And U Know It =

Single by Adina Howard

from the album Welcome to Fantasy Island
- Released: 1997
- Recorded: 1997
- Genre: R&B • dance-pop • hip hop soul
- Length: 4:02
- Label: Mecca Don, EastWest Records
- Songwriters: David Blake, Adina Howard
- Producers: DJ Quik, Robert "Fonksta" Bacon, G-One

Adina Howard singles chronology
"Chocolate (Cuties & Condoms)" (1996)	"(Freak) And U Know It" (1997)	"T-Shirt & Panties" (1998)

"(Freak) And U Know It" is a song by American singer and songwriter Adina Howard, released in 1997, by Mecca Don and EastWest Records, as the lead single from her second studio album, Welcome to Fantasy Island, which was shelved and not released until 2021. Produced by DJ Quik, Robert "Fonksta" Bacon, and G-One, it peaked on the US Billboard Hot 100 at number 70 and the Billboard Hot R&B/Hip-Hop Songs at number 32.

== Critical reception ==
Larry Flick from Billboard magazine wrote, "Howard aims to prove that there's no sophomore slump in her future with this sassy, disco-kissed R&B throw-down. Yeah, she's workin' the "freak" thang yet again. And, yeah, she's capable of far better. But the truth is that the hook here is just too darn infectious to allow for much complaining. Kids are going to love the Cameo-styled keyboard effects that underline the chorus. A fine way to preview the album Welcome to Fantasy Island." British magazine Music Week gave the song a score of three out of five, adding, "Kool & the Gang's 'Get Down on It' provides the basis of this slice of R&B on which Howard is at her most sensual."

== Track listing ==
- CD single
1. "(Freak) And U Know It (Radio Edit)" - 4:02
2. "(Freak) And U Know It (Vybe Remix - Extended)" - 4:35
3. "(Freak) And U Know It (Vybe Remix - Instrumental)" - 4:18
4. "(Freak) And U Know It (Gods Of Prophet Slimmi Trip Remix)" - 6:17
5. "(Freak) And U Know It (Club Mix)" - 7:17
6. "(Freak) And U Know It (Instrumental)" - 4:10
7. "(Freak) And U Know It (Acappella)" - 4:08

== Personnel ==
Credits for (Freak) And U Know It adapted from AllMusic.

- Chris Puram, DJ Quik - Mixed
- DJ Quik, G-One, Rob Bacon - Producer
- Chris Puram - Recording
- Taresha Hudson - Writing

== Charts ==
Chart (1997)	Peak position
New Zealand (Recorded Music NZ)	33
US Billboard Hot 100	70
US Hot R&B/Hip-Hop Songs (Billboard)	32
