= 7... =

Studio album by Mint Condition
- Released: April 5, 2011
- Genre: R&B
- Length: 45:41
- Label: Shanachie
- Producer: Mint Condition

Mint Condition chronology
E-Life (2008)	7... (2011)	Music At the Speed of Life (2012)

Singles from 7...
- 1. "Caught My Eye" Released: January 17, 2011; 2. "Walk On" Released: August 12, 2011

7... is the seventh studio album by American R&B band Mint Condition released on April 5, 2011. It is the first album the band has released on the label Shanachie Records. The album title refers to this being their seventh album in their 20 years of performing. At under 46 minutes, it also is distinctive as being the shortest album in their catalog. The album cover was photographed by bassist Ricky Kinchen, who has done the photography for all Mint Condition albums since 1999's Life's Aquarium.

The music videos released from the album are recognized for their ties to actors. Actress Regina King directed the video for the Kelly Price duet "Not My Daddy". The video for the single "Walk On" stars Carl Anthony Payne II of The Cosby Show and Martin fame.

== Critical reception ==
Professional ratings
Review scores
Source	Rating
AllMusic	4/5 stars

In a review for AllMusic, critic reviewer Andy Kellman wrote: "It’s a shame this band gets a small fraction of the airplay granted to those who have followed in their footsteps. Two decades into their career, they're making some of their best music."

== Track listing ==
7... track listing
No.	Title	Writer(s)	Length
1.	"Can't Get Away"	Ricky Kinchen; Stokley Williams	4:57
2.	"I Want It"	Kinchen; Williams	3:44
3.	"Walk On"	Jeffrey Allen; Williams; Lawrence El	5:14
4.	"Mind Slicker"	Williams	4:40
5.	"Caught My Eye"	Williams; El	3:46
6.	"Bossalude"	Allen; Williams	2:04
7.	"7"	Allen; Williams; K. Jackson	2:17
8.	"Ease the Pain"	Kinchen	4:57
9.	"Unsung"	El	4:33
10.	"Not My Daddy" (featuring Kelly Price)	Warryn Campbell; Kelly Price	4:33
11.	"Twenty Years Later"	Kinchen; Williams	4:52

Deluxe Edition
No.	Title	Length
12.	"Whatchu Want"	4:40
13.	"Cupid’s Hunt"	5:28
14.	"Bless a Woman and a Man"	5:09
15.	"Nothin' Left to Say" (Live Yoshi's San Francisco)	6:20
16.	"I'm Ready" (Live Yoshi’s San Francisco)	5:48

== Personnel ==
Band members

- Stokley Williams – lead vocals, background vocals, keyboards, bass, guitar, drums, steel pan, mixing, mastering
- Lawrence El – piano, keyboards
- Ricky Kinchen – guitar, bass, keyboards, background vocals, drum programming, photography
- Homer O'Dell – guitar, sitar
- Jeffrey Allen – keyboards, organ, background vocals

Additional musicians

- Kelly Price – lead and background vocals on "Not My Daddy"
- Brandon Commodore – drums on "Mind Slicker"
- Darnell Davis – organ on "Unsung"
- K. Jackson – rap on "7"
- Tonia Hughes-Kendrick – vocals on "Unsung"
- Arion-Brasil Williams – shaker on "Can't Get Away"
- Aaliyah Kellogg – additional backgrounds on "Can't Get Away"

Production

- Dave Darlington – mastering, mixing
- Brian Johnson – mixing on "Caught My Eye"

== Charts ==
=== Weekly charts ===
Chart performance for 7...
Chart (2011)	Peak position
US Billboard 200	33
US Independent Albums (Billboard)	7
US Top R&B/Hip-Hop Albums (Billboard)	12

=== Year-end charts ===
Chart (2011)	Position
US Top R&B/Hip-Hop Albums (Billboard)	98
