= No One Does It Better =

No One Does It Better may refer to:

- No One Does It Better (album), 2000 SoulDecision album, and the title track
- No One Does It Better (song), 2012 You Me at Six song
- "No One Does It Better", song by The Spinners from The Fish That Saved Pittsburgh 1979 sampled on several hip-hop and rap albums

== See also ==
- Nobody Does It Better (disambiguation)
