= Nobody Does It Betta =

Single by Mint Condition

from the album From the Mint Factory
- B-side: "Single to Mingle"
- Released: October 5, 1993
- Recorded: 1993
- Genre: New jack swing
- Length: 5:05 (album version); 3:35 (single edit)
- Label: Perspective
- Songwriter(s): Stokley Williams
- Producer(s): Mint Condition; Jimmy Jam & Terry Lewis

Mint Condition singles chronology
"Forever in Your Eyes" (1992)	"Nobody Does It Betta" (1993)	"U Send Me Swingin'" (1993)

"Nobody Does It Betta" is a song performed by Mint Condition, issued as the lead single from their second album From the Mint Factory. The song was produced by the band and written by the band's lead singer Stokley Williams. It peaked at #45 on the Billboard R&B chart in 1993.

The song's music video was directed by Antoine Fuqua.

== Chart positions ==
Chart (1993)	Peak position
US Hot R&B/Hip-Hop Singles & Tracks (Billboard)	45
