= Breakin' My Heart (Pretty Brown Eyes) =

Single by Mint Condition

from the album Meant to Be Mint
- Released: November 11, 1991
- Recorded: 1991
- Studio: Flyte Tyme Studios (Edina, Minnesota)
- Genre: R&B; soul
- Length: 5:58 (album version); 4:48 (radio edit)
- Label: Perspective Records
- Songwriters: Jeffrey Allen; Lawrence Waddell; Stokley Williams
- Producers: Mint Condition; Jellybean Johnson

Mint Condition singles chronology
"Are You Free" (1991)	"Breakin' My Heart (Pretty Brown Eyes)" (1991)	"Forever in Your Eyes" (1992)

Music video
- "Breakin' My Heart (Pretty Brown Eyes)" on YouTube

"Breakin' My Heart (Pretty Brown Eyes)" is a song by American R&B band Mint Condition, released in November 1991 by Perspective Records, as the second single from their debut album, Meant to Be Mint (1991). The song was written by band members Jeffrey Allen, Lawrence Waddell and Stokley Williams, and is their biggest hit to date. It peaked at numbers six and fifteen on the US Billboard Hot 100 and Cash Box Top 100 charts in 1992. The single spent a total of 34 and 23 weeks on these charts, as well as 20 weeks in the top 40 on the Billboard Hot R&B Singles chart.

In 2022 and 2024, there was media notice that "Breakin' My Heart (Pretty Brown Eyes)" had been repopularized on TikTok.

== Charts ==
=== Weekly charts ===
Chart (1992)	Peak position
Australia (ARIA)	192
US Billboard Hot 100	6
US Hot R&B Singles (Billboard)	3
US Cash Box Top 100	15

=== Year-end charts ===
Chart (1992)	Position
US Billboard Hot 100	48
