= Definition of a Band =

Studio album by Mint Condition
- Released: September 24, 1996
- Recorded: December 1995 – June 1996
- Studios: Flyte Tyme Studios (Edina, Minnesota); Tricord Studios (Eden Prairie, Minnesota)
- Genres: R&B; neo soul
- Length: 66:08
- Label: Perspective
- Producer: Mint Condition

Mint Condition chronology
From the Mint Factory (1993)	Definition of a Band (1996)	Life's Aquarium (1999)

Singles from Definition of a Band
- 1. "What Kind of Man Would I Be" Released: August 20, 1996; 2. "You Don't Have To Hurt No More" Released: January 9, 1997; 3. "Let Me Be The One" Released: April 4, 1997

Professional ratings
Review scores
Source	Rating
AllMusic	4/5 stars
Muzik	4.5/5 stars

Definition of a Band is the third studio album by the R&B band Mint Condition. It was released on September 24, 1996, on Perspective Records. Definition of a Band was Mint Condition's most successful recording to date, yielding two hit singles and a Gold certification from the RIAA.

== Background ==
Before the release of the album, the band were faced with label troubles. Their mentors and label heads Jimmy Jam & Terry Lewis severed ties with Perspective Records. As a result, Mint Condition were moved to its parent company A&M Records, though the company kept the Perspective name for the release of Definition of a Band. This would be their final studio album released under Perspective Records. Another album released under the label was their greatest hits anthology The Collection (1991-1998)- an album that contained their hits alongside 12 inch versions, B-sides and remixes. They would move to Elektra Entertainment for their next album Life's Aquarium.

== Commercial performance ==
The album charted at number 76 on the Billboard 200 and number 13 on the R&B/Hip-Hop albums chart.

Two singles were released from Definition of a Band. The first single, "What Kind of Man Would I Be", charted at number 17 on the Billboard Hot 100 and 2 on R&B/Hip-Hop Singles and Tracks. It sold 600,000 copies domestically and was certified gold by the RIAA. Its video was directed by art director Frank Kozik. The second single, "You Don't Have To Hurt No More", charted at number 32 on the Billboard Hot 100 and 10 on R&B/Hip-Hop Singles and Tracks. Its video was directed by Devo frontman Gerald Casale. This album is their third studio album to be mastered by Brian Gardner- who also worked on their previous album, 1993's From the Mint Factory as well as their 1991 debut Meant to Be Mint.

== Track listing ==
No.	Title	Writer(s)	Length
1.	"Definition of a Band (Intro)"	Stokley Williams, Chris Dave, Jeffrey Allen	1:05
2.	"Change Your Mind"	Williams, Keri Lewis	4:51
3.	"You Don't Have To Hurt No More"	Lewis	5:22
4.	"Gettin' It On"	Lewis, Williams	4:52
5.	"What Kind of Man Would I Be?"	Lawrence Waddell	4:24
6.	"Let Me Be the One"	Waddell, Williams	5:01
7.	"Definition of a Band - Swing Version"	Dave, Williams	1:00
8.	"Ain't Hookin' Me Up Enough"	Ricky Kinchen, Lewis, Waddell, Williams	4:14
9.	"Funky Weekend"	Homer O'Dell, Williams	4:55
10.	"I Want It Again"	Williams	5:10
11.	"On & On"	Lewis, Williams	4:40
12.	"The Never That You'll Never Know"	Lewis, Williams	4:38
13.	"Asher in Rio (Interlude)"	Allen	0:31
14.	"Raise Up"	O'Dell, Williams	4:36
15.	"On & On (Reprise)"	Lewis, Williams	0:59
16.	"Sometimes"	Kinchen	4:16
17.	"Missing"	Allen	4:15
18.	"If It Wasn't for Your Love"	Waddell	1:19

== Personnel ==
- Stokley Williams - vocals, drums, percussion, guitar, bass, keyboards, producer, composer
- Homer O'Dell - vocals, guitar, drums, percussion, producer, composer
- Ricky Kinchen - vocals, bass, keyboards, guitar, producer, composer
- Keri Lewis - vocals, keyboards, organ, piano, drums, guitar, producer, composer
- Jeff Allen - saxophone, vocals, keyboards
- Larry Waddell - keyboards, vocals, piano
- Chris Dave - drums, percussion
- Lil' Roger Lynch - vocoder
- Mint Condition - record engineering
- Ira Ferguson - record engineering
- Jeff Taylor - record engineering
- Dave Rideau - record engineering
- Steve Hodge - mixing
- Dave Rideau - mixing
- Rich Travali - mixing
- Keith Lewis - mixing
- David Green - mixing
- Mint Condition - executive production
- Jimmy Jam & Terry Lewis - executive production
- Brian Gardner - mastering
- Lisa Pearson - photography
- Tom Tavee - photography
- Greg Ross - art direction & design

== Charts ==
=== Weekly charts ===
Chart (1996)	Peak position
US Billboard 200	76
US Top R&B/Hip-Hop Albums (Billboard)	13

=== Year-end charts ===
Chart (1997)	Position
US Top R&B/Hip-Hop Albums (Billboard)	86
