= T-Shirt & Panties =

Single by Adina Howard

from the album Woo (Soundtrack) and The Second Coming
- Released: May 5, 1998
- Recorded: 1997
- Genre: R&B
- Length: 4:50
- Label: Epic/Sony
- Songwriters: Eric Bishop; Billy Moss
- Producers: Billy Moss, Jamie Foxx

"T-Shirt & Panties" is a song by American recording artist Adina Howard. It was written by Jamie Foxx and Billy Moss.

== Background ==
Howard was working with producer Billy Moss at the time on her Welcome to Fantasy Island album, when Jamie Foxx dropped in. He proposed the idea of the song, later sent Howard a demo with finished lyrics, and she requested the song.

Welcome to Fantasy Island, intended to be her sophomore album, was later shelved, but the song eventually was included on her third album The Second Coming (along with another Fantasy Island track "Crank Me Up" with Missy Elliott). A remix was produced by DJ Clue and featured Charli Baltimore and Cam'ron.

It was later originally planned for the soundtrack to Foxx's film Booty Call but was eventually included on the soundtrack to the film Woo. It was released as the soundtrack's third single following "Money" by Charli Baltimore and "Nobody Does It Better" by Nate Dogg and Warren G.

== Legacy ==
While not commercially released except for the soundtrack's release, it became a minor radio hit and R&B classic in the years following, becoming one of Adina Howard's signature songs to perform.

Three artists have covered this song: Brooke Valentine for her 2008 mixtape No More Girlfights, Shanell in 2013, and Georgia Reign in 2014. The vocals were directly sampled in 2000 for the Qalo Mota track, Heartbeat.
