= Private Show (album) =

Studio album by Adina Howard
- Released: June 26, 2007
- Recorded: 2005–2007
- Genres: R&B; hip hop soul
- Length: 41:43
- Label: Arsenal Records

Adina Howard chronology
The Second Coming (2004)	Private Show (2007)	Resurrection (2017)

Singles from Private Show
- 1. "L.O.V.A." Released: November 21, 2006; 2. "Hips" Released: December 18, 2007; 3. "Tease" Released: April 8, 2008

Professional ratings
Review scores
Source	Rating
About.com	2/5 stars
AllMusic	3/5 stars

Private Show is the third studio album from singer Adina Howard. The album was originally set to be a remix set of her 2004 set, The Second Coming, but was changed after Adina liked recording new material so much that she had enough for a full-length album. Although it is her fourth studio album, it is only the third of her albums to be released in the United States and worldwide due to the shelving of her second album Welcome to Fantasy Island in 1997.

== Delays and release ==
The numerous delays that the album experienced, according to Adina Howard, have been attributed to her record label. It was originally believed that the album was shelved by Arsenal Records, but it ended up being leaked online on June 5, 2007. Part of the delay was due to the label refusing to pay for any of the production (songwriters, photography, etc.). It was officially released to retail stores (and iTunes) on June 26, 2007, with a "rose" album cover, which upset Howard. Her original album cover idea (a white-themed photo with a hat) was used on her MySpace when promoting the album, and it later received a third album cover when re-added to iTunes. To date album sales remain at 11,000 copies sold.

"Phone Sex" was released as a teaser single in late 2005. Meanwhile, the album's first single "Hips" was released in early 2006. It was later cancelled, never officially being sent to radio or digital outlets, although it was remixed by many DJs. The official first single, "L.O.V.A." was released to digital outlets late 2006, with a contest run on Adina's MySpace for fans to create a music video for the song. The contest was cancelled, and the song was never sent to radio. Before the album's release, another single, "Picture This" (produced by Poli Paul) was chosen and another MySpace contest was created. No winner was ever announced, nor were any radio add dates for the single. On December 18, 2007, "Hips" was re-released as the album's second single, under the title "My Hips" on iTunes. 4 remixes (Reggaeton, Liggio Grown & Sexy, Radio Edit, & 5000 Watts) were made to support the release. On April 8, 2008, Adina announced on her MySpace that "Tease" is the third single to be lifted off the album, allowing a free download of the track for one week.

== Track listing ==
No.	Title	Writer(s)	Producer(s)	Length
1.	"Intro: Adjust Your Mental"	Adina Howard	Francesca "Francci" Richard • R.E.	1:24
2.	"Picture This"	Paul Poli • Francesca "Francci" Richard • Jeff Jones	Poli Paul • Richard	3:22
3.	"L.O.V.A."	Deacon • Richard • Erin Thompkins	Deacon • Richard	3:05
4.	"Tease"	Michael Little • Richard • Erin Thompkins • Howard	Michael "Doc" Little • Richard	3:28
5.	"Doin' 80"	Poli • Richard • Jones	Paul • Richard	4:10
6.	"Interlude: Bedroom2thaFloor"	Howard	Richard • R.E.	0:53
7.	"Like Me (feat. Reign)"	R.E. • Richard • Thompkins	R.E. • Richard	4:09
8.	"Phone Sex"	Fredrick Crawford • Luana Williams	Blaze	3:48
9.	"Stole On (feat. Kabo)"	Richard • Thompkins	Derek "Grizz" Edwards • Richard	4:15
10.	"Hips"	Mark Williams • Sadiyyah Brady	Tarboy	3:49
11.	"I Forgive You"	Bernard Grobman • Asiah Lewis	Bernard Grobman	3:32
12.	"Outro: Private Show Goodbye"	Howard • Richard	R.E. • Richard	1:43
13.	"Hips (Grown & Sexy Remix)"	Williams • Brady	Chris Liggio	3:46
