= Life's Aquarium =

Studio album by Mint Condition
- Released: November 16, 1999
- Studio: Soul Studios; The Point Studios; Lex Labs(Minnesota); O'Henry Sound(California)
- Genre: R&B; neo soul
- Length: 64:01
- Label: Elektra
- Producer: Mint Condition

Mint Condition chronology
Definition of a Band (1996)	Life's Aquarium (1999)	Livin' the Luxury Brown (2005)

Singles from Life's Aquarium
- 1. "If You Love Me" Released: October 19, 1999; 2. "Is This Pain Our Pleasure" Released: October 22, 1999

Life's Aquarium is the fourth studio album by American R&B group Mint Condition. The album was released on November 16, 1999, and it is their first album released for Elektra Records.

== Background ==
Life's Aquarium is their first studio recording after their departure from Perspective Records, the record company that produced their three previous albums. They made their debut as Elektra artists on the soundtrack to the motion picture Why Do Fools Fall in Love with the song "Love is for Fools". They were originally signed to Elektra subsidiary East West Records, but were later moved to Elektra proper for the release of Life's Aquarium.

Released in November 1999, the album was originally scheduled for release in October of that year. The month-long pushback was due to the label's waiting for the reception to the album's first single "If You Love Me". The song originally appeared as a solo track by Stokley Williams on the soundtrack to the 1998 Jada Pinkett Smith film Woo. The song was re-recorded with the band and featured a string section that was arranged and composed by conductor Clare Fischer. The music video was directed by Bille Woodruff. "If You Love Me" peaked at number 30 on the Billboard Hot 100 and number 5 on the Hot R&B/Hip-Hop Singles & Tracks. A second single was released, "Is This Pain Our Pleasure" and peaked at number 42 on the Hot R&B/Hip-Hop Singles & Tracks chart. The low charting of the song was due primarily to a music video never being made for the song.

Upon release, Life's Aquarium charted at number 64 on the Billboard 200 and number 7 on the R&B album charts. To date, it is the lowest-selling Mint Condition album released on a major label. Life's Aquarium is notable for being their last album as a sextet. One year after its release, keyboardist Keri Lewis would leave the band, reducing the band to a quintet. It is also notable for being their last album released on a major label, as they went independent for their subsequent releases.

== Track listing ==
All music is composed by Mint Condition.

No.	Title	Writer(s)	Length
1.	"Touch That Body"	Ricky Kinchen, Stokley Williams	4:52
2.	"Be Like That Sometimes"	Keri Lewis	4:48
3.	"Pretty Lady" (featuring Charlie Wilson)	Kinchen, Williams	4:16
4.	"Who Can You Trust"	Lewis	5:00
5.	"If You Love Me"	Lewis	6:26
6.	"Spanish Eyes"	Chris "Daddy" Dave, Jeffrey Allen, Williams	5:10
7.	"Is This Pain Our Pleasure"	Lewis, Williams	4:34
8.	"Call Me"	Lawrence Waddell, Williams	5:17
9.	"This Day, This Minute, Right Now"	Waddell	5:17
10.	"Just the Man for You"	Lewis, Williams	2:42
11.	"Tonight"	Lewis	4:09
12.	"Leave Me Alone"	Williams	14:11
Total length:			64:01

Note

- The hidden tracks "DeCuervo's Revenge" and "If We Play Cards" appear at the end of the song "Leave Me Alone".

== Personnel ==
Credits adapted from liner notes.

- Stokley Williams - lead and background vocals, bass synth, drums, keyboards, guitar, bass
- Keri Lewis - piano, keyboards, guitar, drum programming, moog keyboard, background vocals
- O'Dell - drum programming, keyboards, guitar, background vocals
- Lawrence El - keyboards, fender rhodes, accordion, background vocals
- Jeffrey Allen - saxophone, fender rhodes, keyboards, background vocals
- Ricky Kinchen - bass, background vocals
- Chris "Daddy" Dave - drums
- Dei Dei Dionne, Esther Godinez - additional vocals
- Clare Fischer - string arrangement
- Prince Charles Alexander - record engineering
- Jeff “Madjef” Taylor - record engineering
- Xavier Smith - record engineering
- Tony Maserati - mixing
- Steve Hodge - mixing
- Prince Charles Alexander - mixing
- Jeff “Madjef” Taylor - mixing
- Warren Riker - mixing
- Herb Powers - mastering
- Scott Schafer - photography
- Ricky Kinchen - photography
- Jim deBarros - design

== Charts ==
=== Weekly charts ===
Chart (1999)	Peak position
US Billboard 200	64
US Top R&B/Hip-Hop Albums (Billboard)	7

=== Year-end charts ===
Chart (2000)	Position
US Top R&B/Hip-Hop Albums (Billboard)	98
