= Do You Wanna Ride? =

Studio album by Adina Howard
- Released: February 28, 1995
- Genre: R&B
- Length: 40:47
- Label: EastWest
- Producer: Jorge Corante; Mark Loma; Moe Doe & Lea Rei; Dinky Bingham; Ron Harris; Doc Little; Somethin' for the People; Mass Order

Adina Howard chronology
Do You Wanna Ride? (1995)	Welcome to Fantasy Island (1997)

Singles from Do You Wanna Ride?
- 1. "Freak Like Me" Released: January 24, 1995; 2. "My Up & Down" Released: June 27, 1995; 3. "It's All About You" Released: November 21, 1995

Do You Wanna Ride? is the debut album by American R&B singer Adina Howard. It was released by Mecca Don and EastWest Records on February 28, 1995. It features the gold-selling hit single "Freak like Me," which was later covered by Tru Faith & Dub Conspiracy in 2000 and by the Sugababes in 2002. Do You Wanna Ride? was certified gold by the Recording Industry Association of America (RIAA) on June 21, 1995.

== Critical reception ==
Professional ratings
Review scores
Source	Rating
AllMusic	3/5 stars
Robert Christgau	(dud)
Knoxville News Sentinel	1/5 stars
Los Angeles Times	1.5/4 stars
NME	7/10

AllMusic editor William Cooper called Do You Wanna Ride? a "lackluster debut release." He found that "there's not much to recommend [on] the album. The main problem with Do You Wanna Ride? is more work was put into the production than into the songwriting. The employment of several producers for various songs doesn't mask Adina Howard's inability to move beyond basic R&B bump-and-grind clichés [...] and her limited vocal range doesn't allow her to soar above the mediocre material."

== Track listing ==
No.	Title	Writer(s)	Producer(s)	Length
1.	"You Got Me Humpin'"	Adina Howard; Jeffrey Fortson; Jorge Corante; Livio Harris; Lord Spencer Nobles; Michael Anderson	Corante; Harris	3:51
2.	"Freak like Me"	George Clinton; Bootsy Collins; Gary "Mudbone" Cooper; Loren Hill; Marc Valentine	Mass Order; Harris^{[A]}	4:13
3.	"If We Make Love Tonight"	Curtis Wilson; Jeff Young; Rochad Holiday	Somethin' for the People	4:24
4.	"I Wants ta Eat"	Al Pretender; Harris	Pretender; Harris	0:28
5.	"You Can Be My Nigga" (featuring Yo-Yo)	Bryant Johnson; Carlos Ford; Lea Reis; Harris; Michael Henderson; Yolanda Whittaker	Reis; Moe Doe; Harris^{[A]}	3:54
6.	"It's All About You"	Andrea Martin; Gary James; Corante; Harris; Henderson	Corante; Harris	3:54
7.	"Let's Go to da Sugar Shack"	Howard; Pretender; Harris	Pretender; Harris	0:50
8.	"Do You Wanna Ride?"	Doc Little; Harris	Doc Little; Harris	4:50
9.	"You Don't Have to Cry"	René Moore; Angela Winbush	Corante; Harris	4:26
10.	"My Up and Down"	Budd Ford; Joey Elias; Kevin Pierce; Harris; Mark Lomax	Pierce; Harris; Lomax	3:41
11.	"Horny for Your Love"	Dinky Bingham	Bingham	3:56
12.	"Coolin' in the Studio"	Pretender; Harris	Pretender; Harris	0:54
13.	"Baby Come Over"	Carl Roland Jr.; Charles Jordan II	Pretender	4:28

Notes

- ^{^[A]} denotes co-producer

Sample credits

- "You Got Me Humpin'" contains a sample from "Humpin'" as performed by the Gap Band.
- "If We Make Love Tonight" contains a sample from "Bumpy's Lament" as performed by Isaac Hayes.
- "You Can Be My Nigga" contains a sample from "You Are My Starship" (1976) as performed by Norman Connors.
- "It's All About You" contains a sample from "Nobody Beats the Biz" by Biz Markie and embodies portions of "Back Seat (of My Jeep)" by LL Cool J.
- "Do You Wanna Ride?" embodies a portion of "Part Time Lover" as performed by H-Town.

== Charts ==
=== Weekly charts ===
Chart (1995)	Peak position
UK R&B Albums (OCC)	12
US Billboard 200	39
US Top R&B/Hip-Hop Albums (Billboard)	7

=== Year-end charts ===
Chart (1995)	Position
US Billboard 200	148
US Top R&B/Hip-Hop Albums (Billboard)	43

== Certifications ==
Region	Certification	Certified units/sales
United States (RIAA)	Gold	500,000^{^}
^{^} Shipments figures based on certification alone.
