= Resurrection (Adina Howard album) =

Studio album by Adina Howard
- Released: April 14, 2017; March 9, 2018 (Re-Release); August 14, 2018 (Physical)
- Recorded: 2012–2016
- Genres: Hip hop soul; trap; R&B
- Length: 42:12
- Labels: Indelible Enterprises, RED

Adina Howard chronology
Private Show (2007)	Resurrection (2017)

Singles from Resurrection
- 1. "Blasphemy" Released: March 20, 2017; 2. "Nasty" Released: March 23, 2018

Resurrection is the fourth studio album by American singer-songwriter Adina Howard. It was released on April 14, 2017 and features the King Gas-produced track "Blasphemy" and "Nasty" which samples her hit single "Freak Like Me."

== Background ==
Following the release of her album Private Show (2007), Howard did some touring and later started work on her next album. In 2012, she released two buzz tracks ("2 Close" and "Ooh Wee") online on her YouTube account. On January 16, 2013, Howard wrote on her Twitter account that her new single "Better Than Ever" would be released soon. She premiered a snippet of the single on January 28 on her official YouTube page. A longer version premiered on March 6 on the mixtape DJ Jump Off's R&B Madness Volume 4. Additionally, she signed a new record deal with Monarchy Records in April 2013. In July, she announced that she will be releasing an EP next, ahead of her forthcoming fifth studio album.

On September 10, 2013, Howard released a new single called "Switch" which was supposed to be the lead single off the album. It received positive reviews, and won "Best Dance/Club Single of the Year" at the 2013 UB Honors, which was voted by the public.

Howard announced in November 2014 that she signed a new label deal with SMG/Sony Red in addition to news of a new single "Bad 4 Me" set for release in December. She released a cover of Amy Winehouse's "Love is a Losing Game" in January 2015 to media outlets.

In May 2016, she announced that the title of the album would be called Resurrection and previewed four new songs ("Love Jonez" "Come Over" "Nasty" "Run It") on her Periscope account, in addition to doing a mini-concert for her fans. In July, one of her new promotional photos went viral, in which she released a sneak peek into her album for her fans the following weekend. A year after its release, the album's lead single "Bad 4 Me" was featured on MTV and garnered renewed interest and radio airplay.

In a radio interview in November, she announced the album will be released on March 17, 2017.

On December 19, 2016, it was announced that rapper Tech N9ne (one of Howard's all-time wishlist collaborators) contributed featured verses on her track "Radiation".

On December 21, 2016, she announced the album's next single to be a track called "Shots".

On January 25, 2017, she shot a music video for the track "Blasphemy" in California. It premiered on March 20, 2017.

On March 29, 2017, Howard unveiled a tentative album cover, in addition to a new track listing, which no longer included the single "Bad 4 Me" but featured a newly recorded track ("Shots") in its place. On April 9, 2017, Howard posted the official album cover on her Instagram.

On April 14, 2017, the album wasn't yet released to digital retailers due to technical difficulties, but Howard announced on Twitter that the album would be temporarily released for free on her SoundCloud account for 24 hours at 12PM PST. A week later, the album was finally released on iTunes and other digital retail services.

In late 2017, the album was pulled from streaming/digital services due to a new distribution deal Howard signed. The album is set for a re-release on March 9, 2018.

Following the re-release of the album, Howard released the set's second single, "Nasty" to digital/streaming services on March 23.

On August 14, the physical edition of the album was made available through Howard's official website.

== Track listing ==
1. "Radiation" (featuring Tech N9ne) - 4:17
2. "Run It" - 3:45
3. "Nasty" - 3:58
4. "Love Jonez" - 3:25
5. "Come Over" - 3:39
6. "I'm the Plug" - 3:27
7. "Shots" (featuring King Gas) - 4:14
8. "Dishonest Mistake" (featuring Adrian Crutchfield) - 3:17
9. "Blasphemy" (featuring King Gas) - 3:45
10. "Work" (featuring King Gas) - 4:17
11. "Dearly Departed" - 4:49

== Reception ==
In November, Howard received two UB Honors nominations in the Best Artist Return Single (for "Blasphemy" with King Gas) and Best Independent R&B Album Release (for Resurrection).

In December, she further received two more award nominations, at the MCP Music Awards for Best Deep Cut of the Year ("Radiation" (with Tech N9ne)) and Best Comeback of the Year (for "Blasphemy" with King Gas).
