= E-Life (album) =

Studio album by Mint Condition
- Released: May 8, 2008
- Genre: R&B
- Length: 59:57
- Labels: Caged Bird; Image
- Producer: Mint Condition

Mint Condition chronology
Livin' the Luxury Brown (2005)	E-Life (2008)	7... (2011)

Singles from E-Life
- 1. "Baby Boy, Baby Girl" Released: 2008; 2. "Nothing Left to Say" Released: 2009

Professional ratings
Review scores
Source	Rating
Allmusic	4/5 stars

E-Life is the sixth studio album by the band Mint Condition issued in 2008 on Image Entertainment. The album reached No. 8 on the Billboard Top R&B/Hip-Hop Albums chart and No. 12 on the Billboard Top Independent Albums chart.

== Overview ==
E-Life is Mint Condition's second album for the label Image Entertainment.

The first single released from E-Life was the song "Baby Boy, Baby Girl"- with an alternate version sent to radio featuring guest vocals from neo-soul singer Anthony Hamilton. The second single "Nothing Left to Say" featured a music video directed by fellow Minneapolis, Minnesota native and independent filmmaker Wayne H. Johnson, Jr. The music video was created by the faculty and students of Globe University/Minnesota School of Business. Members of the school's Music Business program, digital video and media production programs were primarily responsible for the making of the video.

The song "Why Do We Try" was later covered by Robert Glasper with Mint Condition frontman Stokley Williams on Glasper's 2012 album Black Radio.

== Track listing ==
No.	Title	Writer(s)	Length
1.	"Baby Boy, Baby Girl (feat. Anthony Hamilton)"	Ricky Kinchen, Stokley Williams, Lawrence Waddell, Anthony Hamilton	4:27
2.	"Somethin' (feat. Phonte)"	Kinchen, Williams, Waddell, Phonte Coleman	4:39
3.	"Just Can't Believe"	Williams	4:19
4.	"Goldigger [sic]"	Kinchen, Waddell, Williams	4:50
5.	"Gratitude"	Williams, Kinchen	3:51
6.	"Nothing Left to Say"	Williams, Waddell, Traylor	4:46
7.	"Right Here"	Homer O'Dell, Williams	4:49
8.	"E-Life"	Williams	1:01
9.	"Why Do We Try (feat. Ali Shaheed Muhammad)"	Kinchen, Jeffrey Allen, Williams, Chris Dave	5:20
10.	"Back and Forth"	Williams	6:05
11.	"Moan"	O'Dell, Williams, Waddell	4:14
12.	"Queen of Come Here Go Away"	Williams	2:50
13.	"Wish I Could Love You (Pimp Juice)"	Kinchen	4:52
14.	"Baby Boy Baby Girl"	Kinchen, Williams, Waddell	3:55

== Personnel ==
Credits adapted from album's text.

- Stokley Williams - lead and background vocals, drums, drum programming, guitar, bass synth, moog, keyboards, harmonica, steel pan
- Ricky Kinchen - co-lead and background vocals, bass, keyboards, drum programming, acoustic guitar, photography
- Lawrence Waddell - keyboards, piano
- Jeffrey Allen - background vocals, saxophone
- Homer O'Dell - guitar, keyboards, drum programming
- Chris Dave - drums
- Phonte - rap, background vocals
- Alicia Marie - intro vocals
- Brandon Kinchen - intro vocals
- Ali Shaheed Muhammad - turntables
- Anna - trumpet
- Kat Higgins - background vocals
- Brian Johnson - mixing
- Herb Powers, Jr. - mastering
