= Livin' the Luxury Brown =

Studio album by Mint Condition
- Released: April 26, 2005
- Genres: R&B; neo soul
- Length: 73:46
- Label: Image
- Producers: Mint Condition; Earthtone III

Mint Condition chronology
Life's Aquarium (1999)	Livin' the Luxury Brown (2005)	E-Life (2008)

Livin' the Luxury Brown is the fifth studio album by American R&B group Mint Condition. The album was released on April 26, 2005 on Image Entertainment. Livin' the Luxury Brown is the first album released as a quintet, after the departure of the band's keyboardist Keri Lewis.

The album charted at No. 45 on the Billboard 200, No. 11 on the Top R&B Albums chart and No. 1 on the Top Independent Albums chart, becoming the group's successful independent album. Two singles were released, "Whoaa" and "I'm Ready", the latter reaching No. 49 on the Billboard Top R&B/Hip-Hop Singles & Tracks chart.

== Track listing ==
No.	Title	Writer(s)	Length
1.	"Mintrolude"	Stokley Williams, Chris "Daddy" Dave	0:48
2.	"My Sista"	Homer O'Dell, Williams	3:42
3.	"Look Whachu Done 2 Me"	Williams	5:20
4.	"Whoaa"	Williams	4:11
5.	"I'm Ready"	Williams	5:26
6.	"Love Your Tears"	Lawrence Waddell	3:51
7.	"Mintal (Interlude)"	Williams	1:09
8.	"Luxury Brown"	Ricky Kinchen, Williams, Alicia Marie	4:42
9.	"Half an Hour"	Kinchen, Williams	4:14
10.	"It's Hard"	Kinchen, Williams, André Benjamin, Antwan Patton, David Sheats, Roderick Roachford	5:20
11.	"Runaway"	Kinchen, Marie	4:52
12.	"Fallin Apart"	Kinchen, Williams	5:49
13.	"What Happened"	Kinchen, Williams, Jeffrey Allen, Waddell	4:43
14.	"The Tempest (Interlude)"	Waddell	1:40
15.	"Sad Girl"	Williams	5:16
16.	"Doormat"	Waddell, Kinchen	3:44
17.	"One Wish"	Kinchen	4:47
18.	"We Got Us"	Waddell	4:12
