= The Second Coming (Adina Howard album) =

Studio album by Adina Howard
- Released: April 6, 2004
- Genre: R&B
- Length: 49:37
- Label: Rufftown
- Producer: Dante; Missy Elliott; John Fitzgerald McGill; Jamie Foxx; Michael Hillian; Billy Moss; The Platinum Brothers; PMG; Angelo "Lo" Ray

Adina Howard chronology
Welcome to Fantasy Island (1997)	The Second Coming (2004)	Private Show (2007)

Singles from The Second Coming
- 1. "Nasty Grind" Released: 2004

The Second Coming is the second studio album by American singer Adina Howard. It was released by Rufftown Records on April 6, 2004, in the United States. While being her third studio album, it was actually Howard's second album to be released in the United States and worldwide, thus the album title's reference. Two tracks from her 1997 shelved album, Welcome to Fantasy Island appear on this album, "T-Shirt & Panties" and "Crank Me Up".

== Background ==
Following a hiatus from the music industry due to the difficulty Howard received in the shelving of her sophomore album Welcome to Fantasy Island by Elektra Records, she signed with the Rufftown Records and began work on a new album in 2002. Announcing the title Ride Again: 7/2 the album was set for an estimated July 2, 2003, release but was later delayed. Following another title change (Two Can Play That Game), Howard finally decided upon The Second Coming and it was released on April 6, 2004.

== Promotion ==
"Nasty Grind" was released as the album's lead single and garnered notable airplay on Urban radio. The single's music video was inspired by D'Angelo's "Untitled (How Does It Feel)". A second single "Outside (The Club)" was planned, with a remix version premiering, but was later cancelled.

== Critical reception ==
Professional ratings
Review scores
Source	Rating
AllMusic	2.5/5 stars

AllMusic rated the album two and a half stars out of five.

== Chart performance ==
The Second Coming debut and peaked at number 61 on the US Top R&B/Hip-Hop Albums chart. The album failed to chart on the US Billboard 200.

== Track listing ==
The Second Coming track listing
No.	Title	Producer(s)	Length
1.	"Outside (The Club)"	PMG	3:40
2.	"Wanna Be"	The Platinum Brothers	3:38
3.	"Don't Wait Up"	The Platinum Brothers	3:23
4.	"Crank Me Up" (featuring Missy Elliott)	Elliott	4:16
5.	"What You Need"	PMG	3:39
6.	"T-Shirt & Panties" (featuring Jamie Foxx)	Billy Moss; Foxx	4:45
7.	"Nasty Grind"	Angelo "Lo" Ray	3:47
8.	"Buttnaked"	The Platinum Brothers	4:01
9.	"It's Not Over" (featuring Ee-De)	The Platinum Brothers	2:57
10.	"Let's Roll"	The Platinum Brothers	3:45
11.	"That Man"	Dante	3:47
12.	"Say What You Want"	Dante	4:11
13.	"Missing You"	John Fitzgerald McGill; Michael Hillian	4:25

== Charts ==
Weekly chart performance for The Second Coming
Chart (2004)	Peak position
US Top R&B/Hip-Hop Albums (Billboard)	61
