= Music at the Speed of Life =

Studio album by Mint Condition
- Released: September 11, 2012
- Genre: R&B
- Length: 59:30
- Label: Shanachie
- Producer: Mint Condition

Mint Condition chronology
7... (2011)	Music at the Speed of Life (2012)	Healing Season (2015)

Music at the Speed of Life (stylised as Music @ the Speed of Life) is the eighth studio album by Mint Condition. It is their second recording for the indie label Shanachie Entertainment.

Music at the Speed of Life has contributions from a couple of veteran musicians, such as former Prince saxophonist Eric Leeds and hip hop legend DJ Jazzy Jeff. They also have an appearance from fellow Minneapolis native Brother Ali, who returns the favor after lead singer Stokley Williams previously appeared on his 2012 free EP for Valentine's Day The Bite Marked Heart and also his 2009 album Us.

Their former labelmate at Perspective Records Bobby Ross Avila contributes vocoder to "Never Hurt Again" as well as the first single "Believe in Us".

The music video for "Believe in Us" was directed by G. Visuals, who previously directed the video for their song "Walk On" from their 2011 album 7....

== Track listing ==
No.	Title	Writer(s)	Length
1.	"In the Moment"	Jeffrey Allen, Stokley Williams	5:20
2.	"Believe in Us"	Ricky Kichen, Williams	4:31
3.	"What I Gotta Do"	Williams, Kichen	4:46
4.	"Blessed"	Homer O'Dell, Williams	3:40
5.	"Slo Woman"	Lawrence El, Williams	4:29
6.	"Girl of My Life"	Kichen, Williams	5:06
7.	"Believe in Us (Reprise)"	Kichen, Williams	1:03
8.	"Completely"	Williams, El	4:07
9.	"Never Hurt Again"	Kichen, Williams	4:29
10.	"Nothin'"	Kichen, Williams	4:33
11.	"Be Where You Are"	Williams	4:38
12.	"Never Hurt Again (Reprise)"	Kichen, Williams	0:47
13.	"SixFortyNine/Changes"	Allen, Williams	5:55

== Personnel ==
- Stokley Williams - drums, keyboards, steel drum on "Slo Woman", drum solo on "Girl of My Life"
- O'Dell - guitar
- Jeffrey Allen - keyboards
- Lawrence El - keyboards and synthesizers, keyboard solo on "Believe in Us" and "Completely"
- Ricky Kinchen - bass, photography

=== Additional personnel ===
- Brother Ali - rap on "SixFortyNine/Changes"
- Nathan Miller - pedal steel guitar on "SixFortyNine/Changes"
- Eric Leeds - flute on "SixFortyNine/Changes", tenor saxophone and all horn arrangements
- Bradley Shermock - trumpet
- Michael Nelson - trombone
- DJ Jazzy Jeff - turntables on "Girl of My Life"
- Bobby Ross Avila - vocoder on "Believe in Us" and "Never Hurt Again"
- Dave Darlington - mixing, mastering
