= From the Mint Factory =

Studio album by Mint Condition
- Released: October 5, 1993
- Studio: Flyte Tyme Studios (Edina, Minnesota)
- Genre: R&B
- Length: 62:28
- Label: Perspective
- Producer: Mint Condition

Mint Condition chronology
Meant to Be Mint (1991)	From the Mint Factory (1993)	Definition of a Band (1996)

Singles from From the Mint Factory
- 1. "Nobody Does It Betta" Released: October 5, 1993; 2. "U Send Me Swingin'" Released: October 5, 1993

From the Mint Factory is the second studio album by American R&B band Mint Condition. The album was released on October 5, 1993, on Jimmy Jam & Terry Lewis' record label Perspective Records. The album peaked and charted at number 104 on the Billboard 200 and number 18 on the Top R&B Albums chart.

== Track listing ==
Credits adapted from liner notes.

No.	Title	Writer(s)	Length
1.	"Intro: Welcome to the Mint Factory"	Stokley Williams, Christopher Dave	0:31
2.	"Nobody Does It Betta"	Williams	5:05
3.	"If the Feeling's Right"	Keri Lewis	4:53
4.	"Devotion"	Lawrence Waddell	0:54
5.	"Someone to Love"	Waddell	5:20
6.	"U Send Me Swingin'"	Lewis	5:15
7.	"10 Million Strong"	Williams	5:41
8.	"Gumbo"	Lewis	0:42
9.	"Good for Your Heart"	Lewis	4:31
10.	"Harmony"	Williams	4:57
11.	"So Fine"	Homer O'Dell, Williams	6:17
12.	"Back to Your Lovin'"	Waddell	4:53
13.	"Always"	O'Dell, Williams	5:31
14.	"Baile de Febrero (For Asher)"	Jeffrey Allen	0:24
15.	"My High"	Williams, Lewis, O'Dell, Ricky Kinchen, Waddell, Allen	2:03
16.	"Fidelity"	Kinchen, Williams	5:31

== Personnel ==
Credits adapted from liner notes.

- Stokley Williams - drum programming, drums, keyboards, djembe drum, bass synth, steel pan, percussion, B-3 organ, clavinet, lead vocals, background vocals
- Keri Lewis - keyboards, drum programming, bass synth, background vocals
- Lawrence Waddell - piano, keyboards, B-3 Organ, background vocals
- Homer O'Dell - guitar, keyboards, drum programming, background vocals
- Ricky Kinchen - bass, background vocals
- Jeffrey Allen -saxophone, keyboards, Fender Rhodes, background vocals

=== Additional personnel ===
- Jellybean Johnson - guitar solo
- Chris "Daddy" Dave - drums
- Foley - guitar solo
- James "Popeye" Greer - background vocals
- Lisa Dixon - background vocals
- Chris "Daddy" Dave - background vocals
- Alice Paguyo - background vocals
- Heidi Valera - background vocals
- Cajun Joe - background vocals
- Mint Condition - record engineering
- Bradley Yost - record engineering
- Jeff Taylor - record engineering
- Steve Hodge - record engineering
- Steve Hodge - mixing
- Dave Rideau - mixing
- Brian Gardner - mastering
- Jimmy Jam & Terry Lewis - executive production
- Jeff Katz - photography
- Rowan Moore - art direction and design

== Charts ==
=== Weekly charts ===
Chart (1993–1994)	Peak position
US Billboard 200	104
US Top R&B/Hip-Hop Albums (Billboard)	18

=== Year-end charts ===
Chart (1994)	Position
US Top R&B/Hip-Hop Albums (Billboard)	67
