= U Send Me Swingin' =

Single by Mint Condition

from the album From the Mint Factory
- B-side: "Someone to Love"
- Released: October 5, 1993
- Recorded: 1993
- Genre: R&B
- Length: 5:15
- Label: Perspective
- Songwriter(s): Keri Lewis
- Producer(s): Mint Condition

Mint Condition singles chronology
"Nobody Does It Betta" (1993)	"U Send Me Swingin'" (1993)	"Someone to Love" (1994)

"U Send Me Swingin'" is a song performed by American R&B band Mint Condition, issued as the second single from their second album, From the Mint Factory (1993). The song was produced by the band and written by the band's then-keyboardist Keri Lewis. Released in October 1993 by Perspective Records, the song peaked at #33 on the US Billboard Hot 100 in 1994.

== Charts ==
=== Weekly charts ===
Chart (1994)	Peak position
US Billboard Hot 100	33
US Hot Dance Music/Maxi-Singles Sales (Billboard)	19
US Hot R&B/Hip-Hop Songs (Billboard)	2
US Radio Songs (Billboard)	47
US Rhythmic (Billboard)	14
US Cash Box Top 100	30

=== Year-end charts ===
Chart (1994)	Position
US Hot R&B/Hip-Hop Songs (Billboard)	10
