= Healing Season =

Studio album by Mint Condition
- Released: October 16, 2015
- Genre: Christmas music
- Length: 44:17
- Label: Mint Condition Music, Kobalt
- Producer: Mint Condition

Mint Condition chronology
Music at the Speed of Life (2012)	Healing Season (2015)

Healing Season is the ninth studio album, and the first Christmas album, by American R&B band Mint Condition. It earned the group a nomination for Best R&B Album in the 59th Annual Grammy Awards, which were held on February 12, 2017.

== Track listing ==
1. Santa Claus Goes Straight to the Ghetto - 4:12
2. Healing Season - 5:53 (Stokley Williams, Jeffrey Allen)
3. 1st Snowfall - 3:52 (Williams)
4. Little Drummer Boy - 4:16
5. Not What I Wanted - 4:36 (Williams, Allen, Larry Waddell, Ricky Kinchen)
6. Lonely Christmas - 4:43 (Williams, Kinchen)
7. A Child Is Born - 5:13
8. Someday at Christmas - 3:13
9. Have Yourself a Merry Little Christmas - 4:48
10. 1 Brand Name - 3:30 (Williams, Allen)
