= If You Love Me (Mint Condition song) =

Single by Mint Condition

from the album Life's Aquarium and Woo (soundtrack)
- Released: October 19, 1999
- Recorded: 1998
- Genre: R&B; neo soul
- Length: 6:25 (album version); 4:16 (single edit)
- Label: Elektra
- Songwriter(s): Keri Lewis
- Producer(s): Mint Condition

Mint Condition singles chronology
"Let Me Be the One" (1997)	"If You Love Me" (1999)	"Is This Pain Our Pleasure" (2000)

"If You Love Me" is a song performed by American R&B band Mint Condition, issued as the lead single from their fourth studio album Life's Aquarium. The song was produced by the band and written by the band's then-keyboardist Keri Lewis. It was also the first single the band released via Elektra Records, after the dissolution of their previous record label Perspective Records. The song is the band's last entry to date on the Billboard Hot 100, peaking at #30 in 1999.

== Charts ==
=== Weekly charts ===
Chart (1999)	Peak position
US Billboard Hot 100	30
US Hot R&B/Hip-Hop Songs (Billboard)	5
US Radio Songs (Billboard)	68

=== Year-end charts ===
Chart (2000)	Position
US Hot R&B/Hip-Hop Songs (Billboard)	43
