= Welcome to Fantasy Island =

Studio album by Adina Howard
- Released: February 19, 2021 (Digital)
- Recorded: 1996–1997
- Genre: G-funk; hip hop soul; R&B
- Length: 58:32
- Label: Elektra Records/Rhino Records

Adina Howard chronology
Do You Wanna Ride? (1995)	Welcome to Fantasy Island (1997)	The Second Coming (2004)

Singles from Welcome to Fantasy Island
- 1. "(Freak) And U Know It" Released: May 20, 1997; 2. "T-Shirt & Panties" Released: May 5, 1998

Professional ratings
Review scores
Source	Rating
Allmusic	link

Welcome to Fantasy Island is the unreleased second album from American R&B singer/songwriter Adina Howard. The album was due for release on July 29, 1997, but the album was then shelved. It later received an unofficial release (excluding "T-Shirt & Panties" and "Crank Me Up" which were included on her The Second Coming release under Rufftown Records) on May 19, 2013, through the mixtape site DatPiff.com.

Despite the album not being released in 1997, it did however spawn two singles, "(Freak) And U Know It" and "T-Shirt & Panties."

In January 2021, it was announced that Rhino Records had acquired the rights to the album and it was finally released onto digital audio platforms on February 19, 2021.

== Background ==
After the success of her debut album Do You Wanna Ride? in addition to her hit soundtrack single "What's Love Got to Do With It?" with Warren G, Howard began work on her sophomore album. During this time, her record label Mecca Don/EastWest Records merged into Elektra Records, headed by label exec Sylvia Rhone. She gained more creative control with the project (originally titling it Portrait of a Lady), being able to hand-pick the songs and working with an array of popular artists such as her then-labelmate Missy Elliott, Bizzy Bone of Bone-Thugs-N-Harmony, DJ Quik, Timbaland, Ginuwine, K-Ci Hailey of Jodeci, and Jamie Foxx. Similar to her debut album, where she recorded a cover of the R&B classic "You Don't Have to Cry," she recorded a cover of the hit Vanity 6 song "Nasty Girl" for the album. However, it eventually did not make the final album tracklist.

Originally set for release on July 29, 1997, the album was preceded by the release of the lead single "[Freak] And U Know It" which was produced by DJ Quik. The song was serviced to radio on May 20, with the music video directed by Francis Lawrence. The single ended up peaking at #70 on the Hot 100, and #32 on R&B (marking her 4th Top40 R&B hit). It also included a B-side track called "Swerve On" featuring Menajahtwa. The album was later pushed back to September 16.

As the album received critical acclaim from such publications as SPIN ("...a sleek, danceable artifact of hip hop-inflected craftmanship."), All Music ("...Howard's second album is a more consistent record than its predecessor, boasting a better selection of songs and grooves.") and VIBE ("...Like an album-length version of the Isley Brothers' booty-call classic "Between the Sheets," Welcome to Fantasy Island offers tracks that are smooth enough to soothe the take-charge woman."), Howard soon faced label issues.

As album delays and creative differences with her label happened (including conflict with then-Elektra Records CEO Sylvia Rhone), Howard soon found her album being shelved, and her departing from the label to get away from the music industry.

To date, Howard remains proud of the album and its cover. "Personal Freak" featuring Bizzy Bone eventually received an official digital release on his 2014 album Revival (original version), and then his 2016 compilation Confessions.

In June 2018, a promo single surfaced for "Crank Me Up" which was revealed to have been in consideration as a single by Elektra Records. It was also included on a promotional compilation titled Elektra's Fallbreakers Sampler 1997.

== Track listing ==
Welcome to Fantasy Island track listing
No.	Title	Writer(s)	Producer(s)	Length
1.	"Welcome to My Queendom"	Adina Howard; Deion Sharra Gabriel, Sr.	Erotic D.	1:01
2.	"(Freak) And U Know It"	David Blake; George Archie, Jr.; Leslie Callaway; Makeba Fields; Rob "Fonksta" Bacon; Taresha Hudson	Quik; G-One; Bacon	5:15
3.	"Personal Freak" (featuring Bizzy Bone)	N8; Tavia Ivey	Kiehl Owens; N8; Curtis "Sauce" Wilson^{[a]}	4:40
4.	"All About U"	Demarie Ameen Sheki	Sheki	4:27
5.	"Crank Me Up" (featuring Missy Elliott)	Elliott; Roderick "Majesty" Wiggins	Elliott; Wiggins	4:20
6.	"Sexual Needs"	Howard; Darryl Pearson; Elgin Lumpkin; Sharlotte Gibson; Timothy Mosley; Traci Nelson	Pearson; Timbaland^{[a]}	4:49
7.	"Could've Got Away"	Alan "Byrd" Tatum; Anthony Tidewell; Barbarella Bishop; Garry M. Shider; Larry Johnson; Linda Shider; Ronald Ford	Tatum; Johnson	3:43
8.	"Another Level (Interlude)"	Howard; Gabriel	Erotic D.	1:41
9.	"T-Shirt & Panties" (featuring Jamie Foxx)	Foxx; Billy Moss	Foxx; Moss	4:51
10.	"I'll Be Damned If I Apologize" (featuring K-Ci Hailey)	J. Corante; L. Harris; K. Hailey	Sheki	4:08
11.	"Don't Come Too Fast"	Derek "D.O.A." Allen; Juanita Wynn; Penny Funk	Allen	5:38
12.	"Take Me Home"	Wilson; Angela Slates	Wilson; Slates	4:19
13.	"Lay Him Down"	Dez Durham; Josh Stevens; Kenneth Edmonds; Tim James	Durham; James	3:44
14.	"Ain't No Need"	Wilson; Arvel McClinton; Catrina Powell	Wilson; McClinton	4:13
15.	"Satisfied (Outro)"	Howard; Gabriel	Erotic D.	1:45

Notes

- ^{^[a]} denotes a co-producer
- ^{^[b]} denotes an additional producer

Sample credits

- "Could've Got Away" contains a sample of "Pumpin' It Up" as performed by P. Funk All-Stars.
- "Lay Him Down" contains an interpolation of Breathe Again" as performed by Toni Braxton.
