= Meant to Be Mint =

Studio album by Mint Condition
- Released: June 11, 1991
- Recorded: 1990–1991
- Studio: Flyte Tyme Studios (Edina, Minnesota)
- Genre: R&B; new jack swing
- Length: 60:48
- Label: Perspective
- Producer: Jellybean Johnson; Mint Condition

Mint Condition chronology
Meant to Be Mint (1991)	From the Mint Factory (1993)

Singles from Meant to Be Mint
- 1. "Breakin' My Heart (Pretty Brown Eyes)" Released: November 11, 1991

Professional ratings
Review scores
Source	Rating
AllMusic	3/5 stars

Meant to Be Mint is the debut studio album of R&B band Mint Condition. The album was released on June 11, 1991, on Jimmy Jam & Terry Lewis' A&M imprint Perspective Records. Meant to Be Mint reached to no. 13 on the Top R&B/Hip-Hop Albums chart.

== Overview ==
Released during the height of the new jack swing era, Mint Condition's debut was more in tune with the sounds of the time. The album was also produced by the Time drummer Jellybean Johnson.

The album's first single, "Are You Free", reached number 55 on the Hot R&B Songs chart. Their second single, "Breakin' My Heart (Pretty Brown Eyes)", reached nos. 3 & 6 on the Billboard Hot R&B Songs and Hot 100 charts respectively. Another album cut, "Forever in Your Eyes", reached no. 7 on the Hot R&B Songs chart.

== Track listing ==
No.	Title	Writer(s)	Length
1.	"True to Thee"	Stokley Williams	5:57
2.	"Do U Wanna"	Homer O'Dell, Williams	4:20
3.	"Breakin' My Heart (Pretty Brown Eyes)"	Lawrence Waddell, Williams, Jeffrey Allen	5:56
4.	"Are You Free"	Williams	4:32
5.	"Here We Go Again"	Keri Lewis	4:22
6.	"Try My Love"	Lewis, Williams	5:47
7.	"Forever in Your Eyes"	Allen, Williams	5:12
8.	"She's a Honey"	Lewis, Williams	5:21
9.	"Single to Mingle"	O'Dell, Williams, James "Popeye" Greer	4:21
10.	"Sensuous Appeal"	Williams	5:04
11.	"Outta Time, Outta Mind"	Lewis, Williams, Allen	4:58
12.	"I Wonder If She Likes Me"	Ricky Kinchen, Williams, Greer	4:55

== Personnel ==
- Stokley Williams - lead vocals, drums, drum programming, keyboards, bass synth, rhythm & vocal arrangement
- Keri Lewis - keyboards, drum programming, percussion, rhythm & vocal arrangement
- Homer O'Dell - rhythm guitar, lead guitar, keyboards, drum programming, percussion, vocal arrangement
- Lawrence Waddell - grand piano, keyboards, keyboard solos
- Jeffrey Allen - saxophone, keyboards, keyboard strings
- Ricky Kinchen - bass guitar, electric bass, percussion

=== Additional personnel ===
- Terry Lewis - vocal arrangement
- Jellybean Johnson - additional lead guitar
- Lisa Keith - background vocals
- James "Popeye" Greer - background vocals, record engineering
- Dave Rideau - mixing
- Steve Hodge - mixing
- Keith Cohen - mixing
- Brian Gardner - mastering
- Jimmy Jam & Terry Lewis - executive production
- Todd Gray - photography
- Rich Frankel - art direction, design
- Rowan Moore - art direction, design

== Charts ==
=== Weekly charts ===
Chart (1991–1992)	Peak position
US Billboard 200	63
US Top R&B/Hip-Hop Albums (Billboard)	13

=== Year-end charts ===
Chart (1992)	Position
US Top R&B/Hip-Hop Albums (Billboard)	24
