= Stokley Williams =

American musician (born 1967)

Stokley
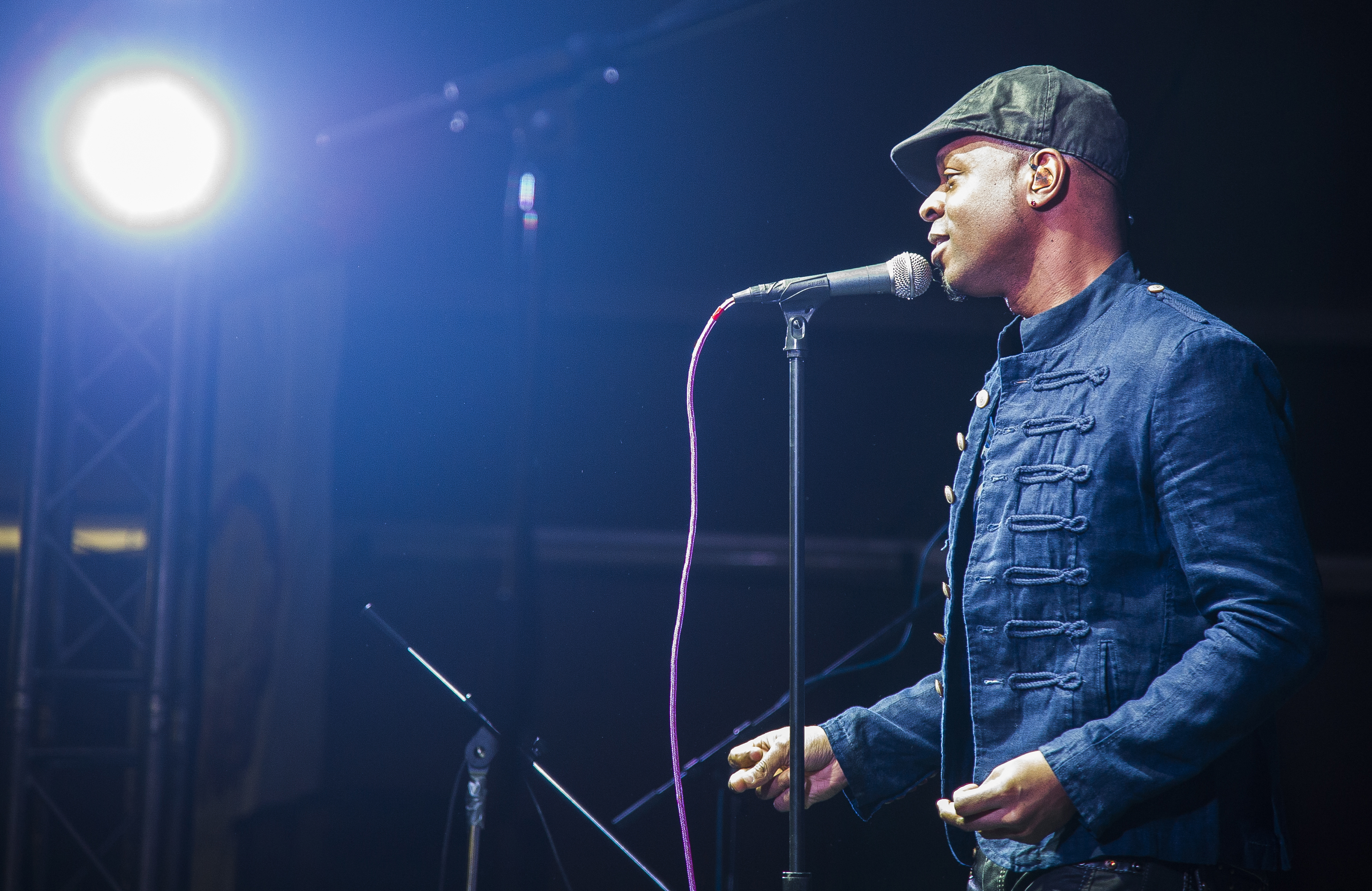
- Williams in 2014

Background information
- Born: Stokley Williams; July 15, 1967 (age 59)
- Origin: St. Paul, Minnesota, U.S.
- Genres: R&B; soul; neo soul
- Occupations: Musician; songwriter; producer
- Instruments: Vocals; drums; percussion; guitar; bass; keyboards; synthesizer
- Years active: 1980–present
- Labels: Perspective; Elektra; Image; Shanachie; Concord; Bluraffe Ent
- Formerly of: Mint Condition

Stokley Williams (born July 15, 1967), also known simply as Stokley, is an American musician from St. Paul, Minnesota, best known as the lead singer and studio drummer of the R&B band Mint Condition.

== Career ==
In 2011, Williams was featured on Kelly Price's song "Not My Daddy" from her album Kelly which earned him his first Grammy nomination for Best R&B Performance.

In 2017, Williams joined The Revolution on tour, to pay tribute to Prince. Also in 2017, he released his Bluraffe/Concord Records solo debut Introducing Stokley, with production by himself as well as the Philadelphia production team Carvin & Ivan.

In 2019, Jam & Lewis' did a joint venture with Bluraffe ent /Perspective Records to release his second solo album, Sankofa.

In March 2020, Stokley earned his first number-one solo hit with "She..." reaching the top of the Adult R&B Chart (Billboard) for two consecutive weeks and high radio play on stations such as WAMO, WDAS, & WHUR.

In 2024, he was cast as Rick James in Ja'Caryous Johnson's musical stage play, Super Freak: A Rick James Story, set to tour spring of 2024.

== Influences ==
Williams has declared his main influences as being Cliff Alexis Sr., Prince, and Maurice White.

== Discography as a session musician ==
The Boys - The Boys (1990)

- "Got to Be There" (drums)

Sounds of Blackness – The Evolution of Gospel (1991)

- "Optimistic" (handclaps)
- "The Pressure Pt. 1" (background vocals)
- "The Pressure Pt. 2" (background vocals)

Karyn White – Ritual of Love (1991)

- "Ritual of Love" (percussion)
- "Love That's Mine" (background vocals)
- "Do Unto Me" (drummer)
- "Hard To Say Goodbye" (drum programming, percussion, background vocals)

Mo' Money – Original Motion Picture Soundtrack (1992)

- The Harlem Yacht Club- "Brother Will" (drummer)

Janet Jackson – janet. (1993)

- "What'll I Do" (drummer)
- "The Body That Loves You" (percussion)

Johnny Gill – Provocative (1993)

- "The Floor" (background vocals)
- "Where No Man Has Gone Before" (background vocals)
- "Mastersuite" (drummer, percussion)
- "Quiet Time To Play" (percussion)
- "I Know Where I Stand" (percussion)

Color Me Badd – Time and Chance (1993)

- "The Bells" (drummer)

Jason's Lyric – Original Motion Picture Soundtrack (1994)

- Black Men United – "U Will Know" (lead vocals, background vocals)

Karyn White – Make Him Do Right (1994)

- "One Minute" (drummer, percussion)

Sounds of Blackness – Africa to America: The Journey of the Drum (1994)

- "The Lord Will Make A Way" (drummer, percussion)
- "The Drum (Africa To America)" (percussion)

J. Spencer – Blue Moon (1995)

- "U Should Be Mine" (lead vocals)

Solo – Solo (1995)

- "A Change Is Gonna Come" (drummer)

Soultry – Soultry (1995)

- "Where Do Broken Hearts Belong" (writer, producer, drummer, percussion, bass synthesizer)
- "I Knew All Along" (writer, producer, drummer)
- "Can I Get To Know You" (producer)

Janet Jackson – Design of a Decade: 1986–1996 (1995)

- "Twenty Foreplay" (drummer)

New Edition – Home Again (1996)

- "One More Day" (percussion)

Ann Nesby – I'm Here For You (1996)

- "I'm Still Wearing Your Name" (drummer)
- "(What A) Lovely Evening" (drummer)
- "Thrill Me" (drummer)
- "This Weekend" (drummer)
- "Let Old Memories Be" (drummer)

Jesse Powell - Jesse Powell

- "All Alone" (writer, producer, background vocals, drummer)

4.0 – 4.0 (1997)

- "Oh Baby" (drummer)

Luther Vandross – One Night with You: The Best of Love, Volume 2 (1997)

- "I Won't Let You Do That To Me" (percussion)

Jon Secada – Secada (1997)

- "Too Late, Too Soon" (percussion)

Sounds of Blackness – Time for Healing (1997)

- "The Blackness Blues" (drummer)

How Stella Got Her Groove Back (1998)

- K-Ci & JoJo – "Never Say Never Again" (drummer)

Elton John and Tim Rice's Aida (1999)

- Elton John & Janet Jackson – "I Know The Truth" (drummer)

Jordan Knight – Jordan Knight (1999)

- "Finally Finding Out" (percussion)

Yolanda Adams – Mountain High...Valley Low (1999)

- "Open My Heart" (drummer)

Usher – 8701 (2001)

- "Twork It Out" (drummer)
- "How Do I Say" (drummer)

Blu Cantrell – So Blu (2001)

- "I'll Find A Way" (drummer)

Deborah Cox – The Morning After (2002)

- Hurt So Much" (drummer)

Toni Braxton – More Than a Woman (2002)

- "Lies, Lies, Lies" (acoustic guitar, guitar solo)

Ann Nesby – Put It on Paper (2002)

- "I'm Your Friend" (featuring Big Jim Wright) (drummer)

Ali Shaheed Muhammad – Shaheedullah and Stereotypes (2004)

- "Put Me On" (vocals)
- "Banga" (background vocals)

Prince – Musicology (2004)

- "Call My Name" (background vocals)

Jill Scott- The Real Thing: Words and Sounds Vol. 3 (2007)

- "How It Make You Feel" (producer, bass, guitar, drum programming, keyboards)

Brother Ali – Us (2009)

- "Brothers And Sisters" (background vocals)
- "Us" (background vocals)

Tech N9ne – All 6's and 7's (2011)

- "The Boogieman" (background vocals)

Kelly Price – Kelly (2011)
Mint Condition – 7... (2011)

- "Not My Daddy" (co-vocals, co-producer, drummer, keyboards, bass)

Elzhi – Elmatic (2011)

- "Life's A Bitch" (additional vocals)

Brother Ali – The Bite Marked Heart (2012)

- "I'll Be Around" (background vocals)

The World Famous Tony Williams- King or the Fool (2012)

- "Mr. Safety" (additional vocals)

The Robert Glasper Experiment – Black Radio (2012)

- "Why Do We Try" (lead vocals, percussion)

U-Nam & Friends – Weekend in L.A (A Tribute To George Benson) (2012)

- "Nature Boy" (lead vocals)

Brian Culbertson – Dreams (2012)

- "No Limits" (lead vocals)

Wale – The Gifted (2013)

- "The Curse of the Gifted" (uncredited background vocals)
- "LoveHate Thing" (featuring Sam Dew) (co-producer, guitar, bass, keyboards, drum programming)
- "Sunshine" (co-producer, keyboards, drums, percussion, background vocals)
- "Heaven's Afternoon" (featuring Meek Mill) (co-producer, keyboards, guitar, background vocals)
- "Gullible" (featuring Cee-Lo Green) (producer, drum programming, guitar)
- "Black Heroes" (co-producer, guitar, background vocals)

Lil' John Roberts – The Heartbeat (2014)

- "Space" (additional vocals)

Wale – The Album About Nothing (2015)

- "The Intro About Nothing" (additional vocals)
- "The Bloom (AG3)" (background vocals, additional production)

Boney James – futuresoul (2015)

- "Either Way" (vocals)

Maysa - Back 2 Love (2015)

- "Keep It Movin'" (producer, additional vocals)

PJ Morton - Christmas with PJ Morton (2018)

- "All I Want for Christmas is You" (additional vocals)

Zo! - FourFront (2019)

- "Sweat" (vocals)

After 7 - Unfinished Business (2021)

- "The Day" (additional vocals, writer, producer, drum programming, keyboards, acoustic guitar)
- "Sum Of A Woman" (writer, producer, drum programming, guitar, keyboards)

== Discography as a group member ==
with Mint Condition

Meant to Be Mint (1991)
From the Mint Factory (1993)
Definition of a Band (1996)
The Collection (1991–1998) (1998)
Life's Aquarium (1999)
Livin' the Luxury Brown (2005)
Live from the 9:30 Club (2006)
E-Life (2008)
7... (2011)
Music @ the Speed of Life (2012)
Healing Season (2015)

with Ursus Minor

Nucular (2007)
Zugzwang (2010)
I Will Not Take "But" for an Answer (2010)
What Matters Now (2016)

Solo album

Introducing Stokley (2017)
Sankofa (2021)
