= Adina Howard =

American singer and songwriter (born 1973)

- Born: Adina Marie Howard; November 14, 1974 (age 51); Grand Rapids, Michigan, U.S.
- Genres: R&B; hip hop; soul
- Occupations: Singer; songwriter; actress; chef
- Years active: 1994–present
- Labels: Mecca Don/EastWest Records; Mecca Don/Elektra Records; Rufftown Records; Arsenal Records; Monarchy Records; SMG/Sony Red; Indelible Enterprises
- Website: AdinaHoward.com

Adina Marie Howard (born November 14, 1974) is an American singer and songwriter. She rose to fame during the mid-1990s with her debut album, Do You Wanna Ride? and her debut single, "Freak like Me". Some of her other minor hits include "What's Love Got to Do with It?" (with Warren G), "(Freak) And U Know It", "Nasty Grind", "Freaks" (with Play-N-Skillz and Krayzie Bone) and "T-Shirt & Panties" (with Jamie Foxx).

== Early life ==
Adina Howard was born on November 14, 1974, and raised in Grand Rapids, Michigan, by her mother with her three younger sisters. The family would later move to Phoenix, Arizona. One of her earliest role models was Madonna, another Michigan native.

In the mid-1990s, she gained the attention of manager-producer Livio Harris, who helped her record some demos and later land a deal with Max Gousse through Mecca Don/EastWest Records.

== Career ==
=== 1993–1996: Do You Wanna Ride? and the hit success of "Freak Like Me" ===
Her debut album Do You Wanna Ride?, featuring the Platinum-certified hit single, "Freak like Me", was released in 1995 and was certified Gold by the RIAA. Her follow-up singles included "My Up and Down" (No. 32 R&B, No. 68 Hot 100) and "It's All About You" (No. 58 R&B).

In 1996, she collaborated with Warren G for the Police Story 3: Super Cop soundtrack with the single "What's Love Got to Do with It" which featured a sample of the Tina Turner hit. The single was another hit for the two, peaking at No. 36 on the Hot 100, No. 32 on R&B, and No. 2 on the UK charts. The music video also featured Jackie Chan in a cameo. Also that year, she collaborated on a track with Somethin' for the People titled "Damned If I Do" which appeared on the soundtrack for A Thin Line Between Love and Hate as well as their self-titled debut album. She also recorded the track "For the Funk" for the Sunset Park soundtrack.

=== 1997: Welcome to Fantasy Island and acting ===
In 1997, she prepared for the release of her second album, Welcome to Fantasy Island (originally titled Portrait of a Lady). It garnered critical raves and a moderate hit with the lead single, "(Freak) And U Know It", but was shelved by Elektra Records in 1997. The album was leaked to the internet a few years later and promotional copies sell for hundreds of dollars.

One of the shelved album's tracks, "T-Shirt & Panties" (a collaboration with Jamie Foxx) ended up on a soundtrack the following year. It was originally slated for the soundtrack to his film Booty Call but it eventually ended up on the soundtrack to the 1998 feature film Woo. It was released promotionally as a single, and the remix featured Cam'ron and Charli Baltimore.

Also this year, she collaborated with Cydal on a track titled "Chocolate (Cuties & Condoms)" which was released as a single for the Bulletproof soundtrack. The track was also included on their debut album Cydalwayz the following year.

During this time, she made her feature film debut in the independent film High Freakquency, starring Deon Richmond and John Witherspoon.

In 2002, she filmed her second movie role, in the still-unreleased Casanova's Demise for director Tigre Hill.

Also this year, she collaborated with the Hip-Hop group PYG'z and Yuck Mouth on the track "Been Around the World" for the former's debut album.

=== 1998–2005: New label and The Second Coming ===
By 2004, Howard released her third album The Second Coming on Rufftown Records. A video was made for the first single, "Nasty Grind", Mark Rezyka Directed the video and the music video was produced by Jack Edward Sawyers. The video featured Adina topless covering herself while she sang. The video played on BET during early morning hours. The album sold poorly due to lack of promotion and only managed to gather 40,000 copies on store shelves and she was later sued by the label. A second single, "(Outside) The Club" was slated to be released, along with a remix album The Second Coming: Remixed & UnCut but both were canceled following her departure from the label.

Later that year, she collaborated with Play-N-Skillz and Krayzie Bone for the track "Freaks" which sampled her hit single "Freak Like Me". The single appeared on the Play-N-Skillz album The Process and became a hit, peaking at No. 52 R&B and No. 69 on the Hot 100 (her first-charting single in 7 years).

She released an official mixtape album (with DJ RIP) featuring new songs, remixes, and unreleased tracks titled Let You Hit through SoundJewelz.com on August 5, 2005.

=== 2006–2007: Private Show ===
In 2006, she announced that the single "Phone Sex" was going to be released, but the following year, the song "L.O.V.A." was released digitally as her lead single. Additionally, a song titled "Hips" was announced to be her second single.

Her fourth album, Private Show was delayed many times by Arsenal Records, almost to the point of being shelved. However, it was released on June 26, 2007, along with a promotional single, "Picture This". As of 2008, the album has sold 4,000+ copies. Following the album's release, a remixes EP for "My Hips" (appears as "Hips" on her album) was released on iTunes & other digital services in December. A third official single, "Tease" was slated to be released, but as Howard parted ways with the label shortly after the album's release, it was cancelled.

In 2008, she appeared in the short film Poke the Sleeping Bear which won the Grand Jury Award at the 2008 Solstice Film Festival.

On September 25, 2009, a UK compilation Independent Soul Divas 2 was released on Lola Waxx Records. This compilation album featured "What Do I Do", a song recorded by Howard in 2008. The album version is different than the version that was originally included on Howard's MySpace page.

=== 2008–2014: Culinary school, marriage and documentary ===
In 2011, she started work on her Culinary Arts degree, a cookbook, a new album and a restaurant in Austin, Texas. She graduated from the Le Cordon Bleu with an Associates in Culinary Arts in October 2012.

In 2012, Howard released two buzz singles online: "2 Close" and "Ooh Wee". She collaborated with rapper Ruffa on the track "I Want You" for his Coming to America album which was released on July 31, 2012.

On January 16, 2013, Howard wrote on her Twitter account that her new single "Better Than Ever" would be released soon. She premiered a snippet of the single on January 28 on her official YouTube page. A longer version premiered on March 6 on the mixtape DJ Jump Off's R&B Madness Volume 4.

Additionally, she signed a new record deal with Monarchy Records in April 2013. She also filmed an episode of TV One's Life After in April, and it is set to premiere during the Fall 2013 season on October 2. In July, she announced that she will be releasing an EP next, ahead of her forthcoming fifth studio album.

On September 10, 2013, she released her new single "Switch" which is the lead single off her fifth studio album The Switch Up. It received positive reviews, and won "Best Dance/Club Single of the Year" at the 2013 UB Honors, which was voted by the public.

On December 3, 2013, it was announced that Howard would be the resident chef on Wednesday nights at Michael's Cafe and Supper Club in Phoenix, Arizona. She completed her run at the end of December.

In June 2014, it was announced that Howard had landed the lead role of April in Derrell Lawrence's touring stage play "Do You Trust Your Best Friend?" and is set to make her stage debut in October in Washington, DC. She later confirmed that her role had been changed to Olivia in the play.

She announced in November 2014 that she signed a new label deal with SMG/Sony Red in addition to news of a new single "Bad 4 Me" set for release in December. Howard is also set to appear on Centric's new docu-series "Being" in early 2015.

She released a cover of Amy Winehouse's "Love is a Losing Game" in January 2015 to media outlets.

A documentary, Adina Howard 20: A Story of Sexual Liberation was released on May 6, 2015.

=== 2015–2018: Resurrection and TV/film projects ===
In June, she announced that her single "Bad 4 Me" will make its premiere on a San Diego, CA radio station on June 5, ahead of her appearance at the Urban Network Digital "Back To Basics 2" Music Summit that weekend. It was released to digital outlets on August 14, 2015. She was also working on her next album now titled #IHeartAdinaHoward (originally titled The Switch Up). She was featured on Pitbull's single "FREE.K", which sampled her hit single "Freak Like Me".

Her "Being" interview originally filmed back in 2014, premiered on December 9, 2015, under their new series "Designed For".

In March 2016, she was featured on the new single "Freak" by R3hab and Quintino, who sampled her single "Freak Like Me".

In May 2016, she previewed four new songs ("Love Jones", "Come Over", "Nasty" and "Run It") from Resurrection on her Periscope account, in addition to doing a mini-concert for her fans.

In June 2016, she announced she'll be playing the role of Candice in the new stage musical For All My Girls alongside April Nixon, Monifah and Marlain Angelides premiering in New York on June 27.

In July, one of her new promotional photos went viral, in which she released a sneak peek into her album for her fans the following weekend. A year after its release, the album's lead single "Bad 4 Me" was featured on MTV and garnered renewed interest and radio airplay. In November, she announced the Resurrection album will be released on March 17, 2017.

On December 6, 2016, she released a Resurrection mixtape with DJ Daz-One on AudioMack. A few days earlier, her vocals were sampled once again on the DJ Luke Nasty track "Adina (Freaks)" produced by Djay Cas.

On January 25, 2017, she shot a music video for the track "Blasphemy" in California. It premiered on March 20, 2017.

On March 17, 2017, an EP containing previously unreleased/released material was released through Famous Records Corp / Echo International called Freaky. While many of the song titles were variations on the word "freak" they were actually renamed tracks from previous releases. "(Gonna Make You) Freaky" was previously released as "It's On Tonight" from her Let You Hit mixtape, "Time to Freak" is rumored to actually be called "Too Sexy" or "Mirror Mirror", "Freak Like Me (Remix) (Re-Recorded Version)" was an actual previously released remix on her 1995 hit single, and "Stay Freaky" was a previously leaked duet with Estevan called "Rough Ridin'".

Her fourth studio album Resurrection was released on April 14, 2017. Due to some issues with iTunes and other digital services, Howard decided to release the album for free (on her SoundCloud) for 24 hours beginning at 12 pm PST. A week later, the album was finally released on all digital services.

In November, she released a short tour film titled Adina Howard: Resurrection Tour Atlanta which premiered on digital services.

Later that month, she received two UB Honors nominations in the Best Artist Return Single (for "Blasphemy" with King Gas) and Best Independent R&B Album Release (for Resurrection). In December, she further received two more award nominations, at the MCP Music Awards for Best Deep Cut of the Year ("Radiation" (with Tech N9ne)) and Best Comeback of the Year (for "Blasphemy" with King Gas).

In January 2018, she did an interview with the online radio show Tha Council Radio and announced she was in the works of co-writing a self-help book tentatively called Adina Howard: Real Raw with a therapist. She also announced a new film role in the independent film The Relaxer, which was to premiere at the 2018 SXSW Festival in March. Additionally, she confirmed she was working with producer-rapper King Gas again on a new album tentatively titled Diary of a Desperate Housewife.

=== 2019–present: Mind Reader and more ventures ===
The new year brought her some high-profile releases. Her profile on TV One's hit "Unsung" series premiered on March 10, 2019. Later that month, her film Relaxer (directed by Joel Potrykus) was released to theaters on March 22, 2019, through Oscilloscope Labs. It garnered critical praise, receiving a 72% positive score on Rotten Tomatoes.

In May, she announced a new single with Mothers Favorite Child called "Freak" after collaborating with them for her acoustic performances for her TV One episode.

She appeared in the documentary A Fatherless America from media personality and filmmaker Tommy Sotomayor which was released in June 2019.

With her promotion for a Detroit performance with Montell Jordan in July, she discussed a new single in the works called "Lifeline" in addition to a book and a motivational speaking career. In a cover story interview with Consciousness Magazine, she announced hopes for a second quarter release for the single.

At the beginning of 2020, her new dance single "Mind Reader" with Opolopo was announced, and released on January 17. After a few weeks, the song ended up hitting No. 1 on the TraxSource charts as well as No. 2 on the Dutch FREAK31 music chart.

In an interview with R&B Junkie celebrating the 25th anniversary of her debut album, she discussed starting a Houston, TX residency set to begin in May.

She also joined Katrina Walker's new theatrical stage play "Miss Dee's Kitchen" which was set to premiere April 3 but was postponed until further notice due to the COVID-19 pandemic.

In December, she received another nomination at the UB Honors in the Best Dance/Club Single of the Year category for her single "Mind Reader."

In January 2021, it was announced that her previously shelved album Welcome to Fantasy Island will be finally released in the United States on February 19 thru Rhino Records.

She released a new single titled "Keep Lookin" on April 23, 2022 to streaming and digital services. A remix featuring Trina was released in July.

Howard began filming a new film, the drama “False Profits” with director Jamezz Hampton in November.

In July 2023, Howard released her first wine “Indelible” in a collaboration with Ramona Ranch Winery along with the announcement of her new upcoming single “Liquor.”

She recorded a new song titled "Time Will Tell" for her film "False Profits" with the film premiering on January 7th 2025, along with a music video on February 20th.

On May 4th, 2025, she premiered a new single "I Overstand" exclusively on her website.

== Personal life ==
She divorced Sherman Jordan in 2017.

In an episode of TV One's "Unsung," from 2019 Howard revealed to having an affair with Boyz II Men-member Wanya Morris in the mid 90's who was dating the singer Brandy at the time. Ignoring the advice to "focus on her career" from Sylvia Rhone, the head of Howard's record label (Atlantic Records), Howard insulted both Rhone and Brandy in an interview with then-DJ Wendy Williams. Rhone ended up stalling the release of Howards follow-up album to Do You Wanna Ride? indefinitely.

== Discography ==
Studio albums

- Do You Wanna Ride? (1995)
- The Second Coming (2004)
- Private Show (2007)
- Resurrection (2017)
- Welcome to Fantasy Island (2021)

== Filmography ==
=== Film ===
Year	Title	Role	Notes
1998	High Freakquency	Performer	
2008	Poke the Sleeping Bear	Rolanda	
2018	Relaxer	Arin	
2015	False Profits	D'borah Byrd-Harvis	

=== Television ===
Year	Title	Role	Notes
1995	Top of the Pops	Herself	Episode: "Episode 32.18"
1999	Ultra Sound	Herself	Episode: "One Hit Wonders"
2013	Life After	Herself	Episode: "Adina Howard: Life After Freak Like Me"
2013	Unsung	Herself	Episode: "CeCe Peniston"
2019	Unsung	Herself	Episode: "Adina Howard"

=== Music video ===
Year	Title	Artist	Role
1995	"Temptations"	2Pac	Ice Girl

=== Documentary ===
Year	Title	Notes
2013	Bone Thugs-n-Harmony: From Cleveland to the World	
2015	Adina Howard 20: A Story of Sexual Liberation	
2019	A Fatherless America	

=== Stage ===
Year	Title	Role	Notes
2004	A Man of God	Sarah	Stage debut
2014	Do You Trust Your Best Friend	Olivia	Originally scheduled to play April
2016	For All My Girls	Candice	Musical
2020	Miss Dee's Kitchen	TBA	Delayed Due To COVID-19

== Awards and nominations ==
Year	Result	Award	Category	Work
2013	Won	UB Honors	Best Dance/Club Single of the Year	Switch
2014	Nominated	Shorty Awards	Singer	
2016	Nominated	Black Reel Awards	Outstanding Independent Documentary	Adina Howard 20: A Story of Sexual Liberation
2017	Nomination	UB Honors	Best Artist Return Single	Blasphemy (with King Gas)
2017	Nomination	UB Honors	Best Independent R&B Album Release	Resurrection
2017	Nomination	MCP Music Awards	Deep Cut of the Year	Radiation (with Tech N9ne)
2017	Nomination	MCP Music Awards	Comeback of the Year	Blasphemy (with King Gas)
2020	Nomination	UB Honors	Best Dance/Club Single of the Year	Mind Reader (with Opolopo)
