= Mint Condition =

American R&B band

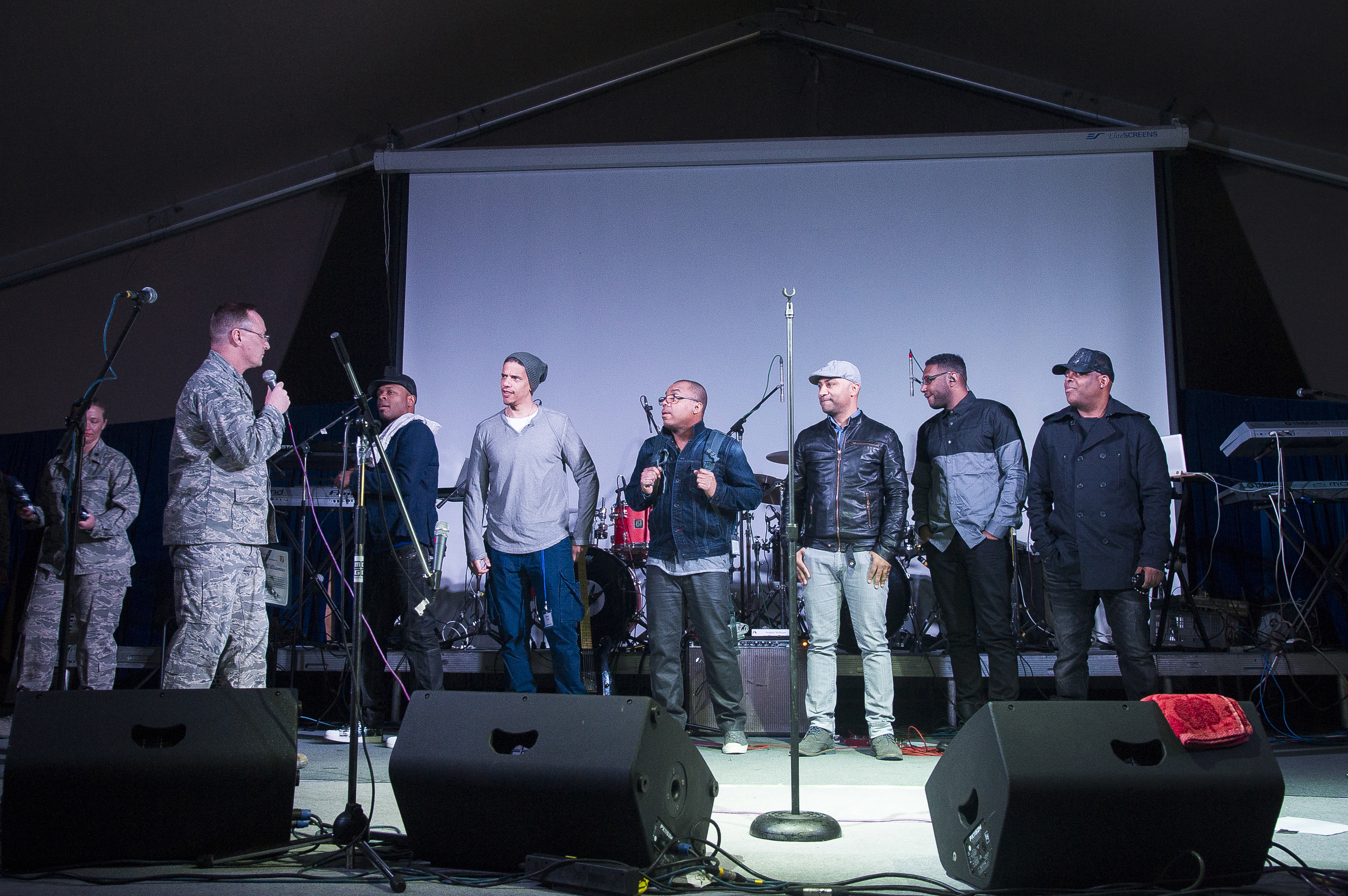
- Mint Condition in 2014

Background information
- Origin: St. Paul, Minnesota, U.S.
- Genres: R&B; soul; funk; new jack swing; neo soul; rock
- Years active: 1985–present
- Labels: Perspective; Elektra; Image; Shanachie; Kobalt
- Members: Stokley Williams; Ricky Kinchen; Homer O'Dell; Larry Waddell; Jeffrey Allen
- Past members: Keri Lewis; Roger Lynch; Ray Coleman; Kenny Young
- Website: mintconditionmusic.com

Mint Condition is an American R&B band from St. Paul, Minnesota. The band is focused on diverse genres such as jazz, hip hop, funk and dance. Mint Condition has also been nominated for one Grammy and three Soul Train Awards. The group is credited with being one of the last major funk bands to chart before hip-hop and new jack swing dominated black music in the 1990s.

== History ==
=== Early years ===
Mint Condition was formed in St. Paul in the early 1980s. The band was originally made up of lead singer and (in-studio) drummer Stokley Williams, lead guitarist Homer O'Dell, keyboardist Larry Waddell, keyboardist/saxophonist Jeff Allen, keyboardist/percussionist/rhythm guitarist Keri Lewis, and bass guitarist Rick Kinchen. They were discovered by music producers Jimmy Jam and Terry Lewis in 1989 during a performance at First Avenue in downtown Minneapolis and were signed to Perspective Records soon afterward.

Their debut album, Meant to Be Mint, was released on June 11, 1991, by Perspective. Afterward, they attempted to attract new jack swing listeners with their dance cut "Are You Free", hitting #55 on the R&B charts. They enjoyed success with the ballad "Breakin' My Heart (Pretty Brown Eyes)," which stayed on the charts for 34 weeks, reached the R&B top 5 (#3) and the Pop top 10 (#6) and was certified gold by the RIAA. Their third and final single, "Forever in Your Eyes", was also a successful Top 10 R&B hit (#7 R&B). Two years later, they released their second album, From the Mint Factory (1993). They enjoyed success with the single "U Send Me Swingin'" which peaked at #2 on Billboard's Hot R&B/Hip-Hop Songs Chart for four weeks straight in the spring of 1994. The song was also a hit on the Rhythmic Top 40 charts, where it reached #14. The band's next two singles, "Someone to Love" and "So Fine", were Billboard Top 30 R&B hits, reaching the #28 and #29 spots, respectively.

=== 1996–2000 ===
In September 1996, the band released Definition of a Band, peaking in the R&B Top 15. The first successful single on this album was "What Kind of Man Would I Be?" (#2 R&B, #17 Pop). The single reached the number 2 spot on the Billboard R&B charts in the following weeks and was certified gold by the RIAA that December. "What Kind of Man Would I Be?" remained on the Billboard R&B Charts for a total of 41 weeks. "You Don't Have to Hurt No More", the second single released from Definition of a Band, was also a Top 10 R&B hit (#10 R&B, #32 pop). The album received positive reviews and, together with the success of the two singles, helped the album reach Gold status.

Two years later, the group released The Collection: 1991–1998, a compilation of their greatest hits. After Perspective Records/A&M Records folded, the group signed with Elektra Records in 1999 and released their fourth full-length album, Life's Aquarium, which also debuted in the Top 10 (#7 R&B). Its main single "If You Love Me" reached the R&B Top 5 and remained on the charts for 31 weeks. The second single, "Is This Pain Our Pleasure", peaked at #42, also peaking at #34 on the R&B Airplay Charts.

=== 2000s: Livin' the Luxury Brown and E-Life ===
After a six-year hiatus, the group resurfaced as a quintet as Lewis left the group to produce for other artists including his ex-wife and singer Toni Braxton. Lewis then joined the entertainment division at Santa Fe Station Casino. In 2005, they released Livin' the Luxury Brown on their independent label Caged Bird Records. The album hit #1 on the Independent Album Charts and in 2006, the group released Live from the 9:30 Club, a live album recorded at the 9:30 club in Washington, D.C..

In 2008, they released E-Life, debuting at #8 on the Billboard R&B album chart and spawned two singles, "Baby Boy, Baby Girl" and "Nothing Left To Say". The latter became the band's first Top 30 R&B single in almost a decade (#27 R&B) as well as a Top 5 Billboard Urban Adult Contemporary hit, peaking at #3.

=== 2010–present: 7..., Tour with Prince, TV appearances ===
In December 2010, Mint Condition joined Prince and an ensemble cast of R&B and jazz musicians for his Welcome 2 America tour. On April 5, 2011, with the group's 20th anniversary approaching, Mint Condition celebrated with the release of their seventh studio album, 7.... Produced by Shanachie Records, it contains several hits, including "Caught My Eye" as well as "Not My Daddy", a collaboration with Kelly Price. During February, Mint Condition appeared as the house band for TV One's program Way Black When, which celebrated the greatest African American music artists throughout the '70s, 80's, and '90s.

In September 2012, the group released Music at the Speed of Life. That December, Mint Condition was entered into the Soul Music Hall of Fame.

In 2013, they were featured on TV One's Unsung. On October 16, 2015, they released the Christmas CD Healing Season.

== Discography ==
Studio

- Meant to Be Mint (1991)
- From the Mint Factory (1993)
- Definition of a Band (1996)
- Life's Aquarium (1999)
- Livin' the Luxury Brown (2005)
- E-Life (2008)
- 7... (2011)
- Music at the Speed of Life (2012)

Christmas

- Healing Season (2015)

== Awards and nominations ==
=== Grammy Awards ===
The Grammy Awards are awarded annually by the National Academy of Recording Arts and Sciences.

Year	Work	Category	Label
2016	Healing Season	Best R&B Album	Nominated

=== Soul Train Music Award ===
Year	Work	Category	Label
1997	Definition of a Band	Best R&B/Soul Album by a Duo or Group	Nominated
1997	"What Kind Of Man Would I Be"	Best R&B/Soul Single by a Group, Band or Duo	Nominated
2005	Livin' the Luxury Brown	Best R&B/Soul Album by a Duo or Group	Nominated

=== Soul Tracks Readers' Choice Awards ===
- Winners: Independent Album of the Year - Mint Condition – Music @ the Speed of Life (2013)
- Winners: Duo or Group of the Year - Mint Condition (2012)
- Winners: Duo or Group of the Year - Mint Condition (2011)
- Winners: Album of the Year - Mint Condition – E-Life (2008)
- Winners: Duo or Group of the Year – Mint Condition (2008)

=== Soul Music Hall of Fame at SoulMusic.com ===
- Inducted: Contemporary Soul Music Artist/Group Or Duo* (December 2012)
