= Jimmy Jam and Terry Lewis production discography =

List of recordings produced by American record producers Jimmy Jam and Terry Lewis

This is a list of albums and singles produced by Jimmy Jam and Terry Lewis.

== Albums ==
=== 20th Century ===
Year	Artist	Album
1982	Klymaxx	Girls Will Be Girls
1983	Cheryl Lynn	Preppie
1983	The S.O.S. Band	On the Rise
1984	Change	Change of Heart
1984	Cherrelle	Fragile
1984	Thelma Houston	Qualifying Heat
1984	Klymaxx	Meeting in the Ladies Room
1984	The S.O.S. Band	Just the Way You Like It
1985	Cherrelle	High Priority
1985	Cheryl Lynn	It's Gonna Be Right
1985	Alexander O'Neal	Alexander O'Neal
1986	The Human League	Crash
1986	Janet Jackson	Control
1986	The S.O.S. Band	Sands of Time
1987	Alexander O'Neal	Hearsay
1988	Cherrelle	Affair
1988	New Edition	Heart Break
1988	Alexander O'Neal	My Gift to You
1988	Pia Zadora	When the Lights Go Out
1989	Janet Jackson	Janet Jackson's Rhythm Nation 1814
1990	Johnny Gill	Johnny Gill
1990	Ralph Tresvant	Ralph Tresvant
1991	Alexander O'Neal	All True Man
1991	Sounds of Blackness	The Evolution of Gospel
1991	Karyn White	Ritual of Love
1992	Various Artists	Mo' Money
1993	Janet Jackson	Janet
1994	Sounds of Blackness	Africa to America: The Journey of the Drum
1994	Karyn White	Make Him Do Right
1995	Michael Jackson	HIStory: Past, Present and Future, Book I
1995	Solo	Solo
1996	Ann Nesby	I'm Here for You
1997	Janet Jackson	The Velvet Rope
1997	Crystal Waters	Crystal Waters
1999	Mariah Carey	Rainbow
1999	Jordan Knight	Jordan Knight
1999	Chanté Moore	This Moment Is Mine

=== 21st Century ===
Year	Artist	Album
2000	Cleopatra	Steppin' Out
2000	Patti LaBelle	When a Woman Loves
2001	Mariah Carey	Glitter
2001	Janet Jackson	All for You
2001	Usher	8701
2002	Bryan Adams and Hans Zimmer	Spirit: Stallion of the Cimarron
2004	Janet Jackson	Damita Jo
2005	Various Artists	So Amazing: An All-Star Tribute to Luther Vandross
2006	Janet Jackson	20 Y.O.
2007	Chaka Khan	Funk This
2007	Patti LaBelle	Miss Patti's Christmas
2010	Usher	Raymond v. Raymond
2011	The Original 7ven	Condensate
2013	Booker T. Jones	Sound the Alarm
2015	Janet Jackson	Unbreakable
2018	Peabo Bryson	Stand for Love
2021	Jimmy Jam and Terry Lewis	Jam & Lewis: Volume One
2024	Ravyn Lenae with Ty Dolla Sign	"Dream Girl"

== Singles ==
=== 20th Century ===
Year	Artist	Single
1982	The S.O.S. Band	"High Hopes"
1983	Cheryl Lynn	"Encore"
1983	Cheryl Lynn	"Preppie"
1983	Real to Reel	"Can You Treat Me Like She Does?" (Note: Co-produced with Leon F. Sylvers III.)
1983	The S.O.S. Band	"Just Be Good to Me"
1983	The S.O.S. Band	"Tell Me If You Still Care"
1984	Change	"Change of Heart"
1984	Change	"Say You Love Me Again"
1984	Change	"You Are My Melody"
1984	Thelma Houston	"You Used to Hold Me So Tight"
1984	Klymaxx	"The Men All Pause"
1984	Cheryl Lynn	"This Time"
1984	The S.O.S. Band	"For Your Love"
1985	Change	"Warm"
1985	Force MDs	"Tender Love"
1985	Klymaxx	"I Miss You"
1985	Klymaxx	"Lock and Key"
1985	Klymaxx	"Meeting in the Ladies Room"
1985	Alexander O'Neal	"A Broken Heart Can Mend"
1985	Alexander O'Neal	"If You Were Here Tonight"
1985	Alexander O'Neal	"Innocent"
1986	The Human League	"Human"
1986	The Human League	"I Need Your Loving"
1986	The Human League	"Love Is All That Matters"
1986	Janet Jackson	"Control"
1986	Janet Jackson	"Nasty"
1986	Janet Jackson	"What Have You Done for Me Lately"
1986	Janet Jackson	"When I Think of You"
1986	Alexander O'Neal	"What's Missing"
1986	Alexander O'Neal	"You Were Meant to Be My Lady (Not My Girl)"
1987	Nona Hendryx	"Why Should I Cry?"
1987	Janet Jackson	"Funny How Time Flies (When You're Having Fun)"
1987	Janet Jackson	"Let's Wait Awhile"
1988	Cherrelle	"Everything I Miss at Home"
1988	Morris Day	"Fishnet"
1988	George Michael	"Monkey"
1989	Rhonda Clark	"State of Attraction"
1989	Janet Jackson	"Miss You Much"
1989	Janet Jackson	"Rhythm Nation"
1990	Janet Jackson	"Alright"
1990	Janet Jackson	"Black Cat"
1990	Janet Jackson	"Come Back to Me"
1990	Janet Jackson	"Escapade"
1990	Janet Jackson	"Love Will Never Do (Without You)"
1990	Ralph Tresvant	"Sensitivity"
1991	Janet Jackson	"State of the World"
1991	Alexander O'Neal	"What Is This Thing Called Love?"
1991	Sounds of Blackness	"Optimistic"
1991	Sounds of Blackness	"The Pressure Part 1"
1991	Ralph Tresvant	"Do What I Gotta Do"
1991	Karyn White	"Romantic"
1992	Sounds of Blackness	"Testify"
1992	Color Me Badd	"Forever Love"
1992	Luther Vandross and Janet Jackson	"The Best Things in Life Are Free"
1993	Janet Jackson	"Again"
1993	Janet Jackson	"Any Time, Any Place"
1993	Janet Jackson	"Because of Love"
1993	Janet Jackson	"If"
1993	Janet Jackson	"That's the Way Love Goes"
1993	Janet Jackson	"Throb"
1993	Janet Jackson	"What'll I Do"
1993	Janet Jackson	"Whoops Now"
1993	Janet Jackson	"You Want This" (featuring MC Lyte)
1993	Color Me Badd	"Choose"
1994	Boyz II Men	"On Bended Knee"
1994	Patti LaBelle	"The Right Kinda Lover"
1994	Sounds of Blackness	"I Believe"
1994	Karyn White	"Can I Stay With You"
1994	Karyn White	"Hungah"
1995	Janet Jackson	"Runaway"
1995	Janet Jackson	"Twenty Foreplay"
1995	Michael Jackson and Janet Jackson	"Scream"
1995	Solo	"Heaven"
1995	Solo	"Where Do U Want Me to Put It"
1995	Karyn White	"I'd Rather Be Alone"
1996	Solo	"Blowin' My Mind"
1996	Rod Stewart	"If We Fall in Love Tonight"
1997	Boyz II Men	"4 Seasons of Loneliness"
1997	Mary J. Blige	"Love Is All We Need" (featuring Nas)
1997	Mary J. Blige	"Everything"
1997	Janet Jackson	"Got 'til It's Gone" (featuring Q-Tip and Joni Mitchell)
1997	Janet Jackson	"Together Again"
1997	Michael Jackson	"HIStory"
1997	Michael Jackson	"Is It Scary"
1997	Vanessa Williams	"Happiness"
1998	Janet Jackson	"Every Time"
1998	Janet Jackson	"Go Deep"
1998	Janet Jackson	"I Get Lonely" (featuring Blackstreet)
1998	Janet Jackson	"You"
1999	Mariah Carey	"Can't Take That Away (Mariah's Theme)"
1999	Mariah Carey	"Thank God I Found You" (featuring Joe and 98 Degrees)
1999	Jordan Knight	"Give It to You"
1999	Chanté Moore	"Chanté's Got a Man"
1999	TLC	"I'm Good at Being Bad"
1999	Hikaru Utada	"Addicted to You"

=== 21st Century ===
Year	Artist	Single
2000	Mariah Carey	"Against All Odds (Take a Look at Me Now)"
2000	Mariah Carey	"Can't Take That Away (Mariah's Theme)"
2000	Janet Jackson	"Doesn't Really Matter"
2000	Hikaru Utada	"Wait & See (Risk)"
2001	Yolanda Adams	"Never Give Up"
2001	Mary J. Blige	"No More Drama"
2001	Blu Cantrell	"I'll Find a Way"
2001	Mariah Carey	"Never Too Far"
2001	Mariah Carey	"Reflections (Care Enough)"
2001	Janet Jackson	"All for You"
2001	Janet Jackson	"Someone to Call My Lover"
2001	Janet Jackson with Carly Simon	"Son of a Gun (I Betcha Think This Song Is About You)" (featuring Missy Elliott)
2001	Usher	"U Remind Me"
2002	Bryan Adams	"Here I Am"
2002	Yolanda Adams	"I'm Gonna Be Ready"
2002	Mariah Carey	"Through the Rain"
2002	Kenny Lattimore & Chanté Moore	"Loveable (From Your Head to Your Toes)"
2002	Usher	"Can U Help Me"
2004	Janet Jackson	"All Nite (Don't Stop)"
2004	Janet Jackson	"I Want You"
2005	Earth, Wind & Fire	"Pure Gold"
2006	Janet Jackson and Nelly	"Call on Me"
2006	Janet Jackson	"So Excited" (featuring Khia)
2006	Janet Jackson	"With U"
2009	Beverley Knight	"Every Step"
2009	Ledisi	"Higher Than This"
2011	The Original 7ven	"#Trendin"
2013	IU	"Beautiful Dancer"
2013	IU	"Monday Afternoon"
2015	Janet Jackson	"No Sleeep"
2015	Janet Jackson	"Unbreakable"
2016	Janet Jackson	"Dammn Baby"
2016	Peabo Bryson	"Love Like Yours and Mine"
2019	Jimmy Jam and Terry Lewis with Sounds of Blackness	"'Til I Found You"
2020	Jimmy Jam and Terry Lewis with Babyface	"He Doesn't Know Nothin' 'Bout It"
2021	Jimmy Jam and Terry Lewis	"Somewhat Loved" (featuring Mariah Carey)

== Other songs ==
This section is for songs produced by Jimmy Jam and Terry Lewis that are not on an album they produced and were not released as a single.

- "After You Fall" (Janet Jackson)
- "All She Wants to Do Is Me" (Peabo Bryson)
- "And If I Ever" (Vanessa Williams featuring Simbi Khali)
- "Back 2 da Street" (Solo)
- "Back to You" (Jessica Simpson)
- "Baggage" (Mary J. Blige)
- "Black Box" (Johnny Gill)
- "Black Eagle" (Janet Jackson)
- "Bliss" (Mariah Carey)
- "Blu Is a Mood" (Blu Cantrell)
- "Broken Hearts Heal" (Janet Jackson)
- "Can't Get Enough" (Mary J. Blige)
- "Easy" (Chanté Moore)
- "Exotic" (Peabo Bryson)
- "Goosebumps (Never Lie)" (Peabo Bryson featuring Gary Clark, Jr.)
- "The Great Forever" (Janet Jackson)
- "Harajuku Girls" (Gwen Stefani)
- "Hard to Say Goodbye" (Karyn White)
- "Here for You" (Peabo Bryson)
- "Holdin' On" (Solo)
- "Home" (Carl Thomas)
- "Hooked On You" (Karyn White)
- "I Cry to Myself" (Chanté Moore)
- "I Started Crying" (Chanté Moore)
- "I Wish I Wasn't" (Heather Headley)
- "I'm Thankful" (Yolanda Adams featuring T-Bone)
- "In Bed" (Solo)
- "Joyful" (El DeBarge)
- "(Last Night I Made Love) Like Never Before" (Solo)
- "Lessons Learned" (Janet Jackson)
- "Lingerie" (Usher)
- "Looking for Sade" (Peabo Bryson)
- "Love and the Woman" (Chanté Moore)
- "Love Is a Game" (Morris Day)
- "Love That's Mine" (Karyn White)
- "Mars vs. Venus" (Usher)
- "Mo' Money Groove" (Mo' Money All-Stars)
- "Monstar" (Usher)
- "Mood" (Chanté Moore)
- "My Love" (Johnny Gill)
- "No Regrets" (Case)
- "One Heart" (Karyn White)
- "The Other Side" (El DeBarge)
- "Peabo's Classic Melodies Live from Los Angeles 2018" (Peabo Bryson featuring Chanté Moore)
- "Petals" (Mariah Carey)
- "Possible (Still the One)"
- "Pro Lover" (Usher)
- "Promise" (Janet Jackson)
- "Promise of You" (Janet Jackson)
- "Push Your Tush" (Jessica Simpson)
- "Rainbow (Interlude)" (Mariah Carey)
- "Rated R" (Ralph Tresvant)
- "Ritual of Love" (Karyn White)
- "Sad Songs" (El DeBarge)
- "Sadness" (Peabo Bryson)
- "She's My Love Thang" (Ralph Tresvant)
- "Smile" (Peabo Bryson)
- "So Impossible" (Keyshia Cole)
- "Stand for Love" (Peabo Bryson)
- "Swingin'" (Blu Cantrell)
- "Tabloid Junkie" (Michael Jackson)
- "Take Me Away" (Janet Jackson)
- "Things That Lovers Do" (Kenny Lattimore & Chanté Moore)
- "This Moment Is Mine" (Chanté Moore)
- "Truth" (IU)
- "Walkin' 'Round in a Circle" (Jessica Simpson)
- "Walkin' the Dog" (Karyn White)
- "We Should Be" (Trey Songz)
- "Well Traveled" (Janet Jackson)
- "Xxtra" (Solo)
- "Yours" (Mariah Carey)

== Old table ==
Year	Artist	Title
1983	Captain Rapp	"Bad Times"
	Klymaxx	"Multi-Purpose Girls"
	Ice-T	"The Coldest Rap"
1984	S.O.S. Band	"Break Up"
	Thelma Houston	"I'd Rather Spend the Bad Times With You Than the Good Times With Someone New"
	Thelma Houston	"(I Guess) It Must Be Love"
	S.O.S. Band	"Just The Way You Like It"
	S.O.S. Band	"No One's Gonna Love You"
	S.O.S. Band	"Weekend Girl"
	Cherrelle	"When You Look in My Eyes"
	Cherrelle	"Who's It Gonna Be"
	Thelma Houston	"You Used to Hold Me So Tight"
1985	Cheryl Lynn	"Fidelity"
	Howard Johnson	"Knees"
	Patti Austin	"Summer is The Coldest Time of Year"
	Patti Austin	"The Heat of Heat"
1986	S.O.S. Band	"Borrowed Love"
	Ice-T	"Cold Wind-Madness"
	S.O.S. Band	"Even When You Sleep"
	Patti Austin	"The Heat of Heat"
	S.O.S. Band	"No Lies"
	S.O.S. Band	"Nothing But The Best"
	S.O.S. Band	"Sands Of Time"
	S.O.S. Band	"The Finest"
1987	Herb Alpert featuring Janet Jackson	"Diamonds"
	New Edition	"Helplessly in Love"
	Patti LaBelle	"Just The Facts"
	Herb Alpert	"Keep Your Eye on Me"
	Herb Alpert	"Making Love in the Rain"
1988	New Edition	"Boys to Men"
	New Edition	"Can You Stand the Rain"
	Pia Zadora	"Dance Out of My Head"
	Pia Zadora	"I Really Like You (Not Him)"
	New Edition	"I'm Comin' Home"
	New Edition	"If It Isn't Love"
	Pia Zadora	"Laughin' at You"
	Alexander O'Neal	"My Gift to You"
	Alexander O'Neal	"Our First Christmas"
	Pia Zadora	"Pia's Theme"
	Pia Zadora	"Silence"
	Pia Zadora	"Since I've Been Lovin' You"
	Alexander O'Neal	"Sleigh Ride"
	Pia Zadora	"Still Remembered"
	Alexander O'Neal	"Thank You For a Good Year"
	New Edition	"You're Not My Kind of Girl"
1990	Johnny Gill	"Giving My All To You"
	Michael Jeffries and Karyn White	"Not Thru Being With U"
	Johnny Gill	"Rub You the Right Way"
1992	Big Daddy Kane	"A Job Ain't Nuttin' But Work"
	Color Me Badd	"Forever Love"
	Caron Wheeler	"I Adore You"
	MC Lyte	"Ice Cream Dream"
	Sounds of Blackness	"Joy"
	Krush	"Let's Get Together (So Groovy Now)"
	Johnny Gill	"Let's Just Run Away"
	Ralph Tresvant	"Money Can't Buy You Love"
	Mint Condition	"My Dear"
	Shabba Ranks	"Slow and Sexy"
	Jimmy Jam & Terry Lewis	"The New Style"
1993	Johnny Gill	"A Cute, Sweet Love Addiction"
	Color Me Badd	"Choose"
	Lisa Keith	"Free As You Wanna Be"
	Johnny Gill	"I Know Where I Stand"
	Lisa Keith	"I'm in Love"
	Lisa Keith	"Love Isn't Body... It's Soul"
	Johnny Gill	"Provocative"
	Johnny Gill	"Quiet Time To Play"
	Color Me Badd	"The Bells"
	Johnny Gill	"The Floor"
	Johnny Gill	"Where No Man Has Gone Before"
1994	Janet Jackson	"70's Love Groove"
	Boyz II Men	"All Around the World"
	Barry White	"Come On"
	Tevin Campbell	"Gotta Get Yo' Groove On"
	Barry White	"I Only Want To Be With You"
	Gladys Knight	"Next Time"
	Ralph Tresvant	"Sex-O"
	Raja Nee	"Turn It Up"
	Ralph Tresvant	"Who's The Mack?"
	Ralph Tresvant	"When I Need Somebody"
1996	New Edition	"Home Again"
	New Edition	"I'm Still in Love With You"
	Rod Stewart	"If We Fall in Love Tonight"
	New Edition	"Oh, Yeah, It Feels So Good"
	New Edition	"One More Day"
	Crystal Waters	"Say... If You Feel Alright"
	New Edition	"Something About You"
	Rod Stewart	"When I Need You"
	Nathan Morris	"Wishes"
1997	Jon Secada	"After All Is Said and Done"
	Jon Secada	"Amándolo (Too Late, Too Soon)"
	Boyz II Men	"Can You Stand the Rain (A cappella)"
	Jon Secada	"Forever (Is As Long As It Lasts)"
	Jon Secada	"Hasta el Fin (Forever Is As Long As It Lasts)"
	4.0	"Have A Little Mercy"
	Jon Secada	"Heaven Is You"
	Boyz II Men	"Human II (Don't Turn Your Back on Me)"
	All-4-One	"I Turn to You"
	4.0	"I Won't Run Out of Love"
	Patti LaBelle	"Let Me Be Your Lady"
	Patti LaBelle	"Someone Like You"
	Jon Secada	"Too Late, Too Soon"
	Patti LaBelle	"When You Talk About Love"
1998	Mary J. Blige	"Beautiful"
1998	Five	"Human (The Five Remix)"
1998	Boyz II Men	"I Will Get There"
1998	Smooth	"It's On"
1998	Angel Grant	"Lil' Red Boat"
1998	Shaggy	"Luv Me, Luv Me"
1998	Boyz II Men and Chante Moore	"Your Home Is In My Heart"
1999	Yolanda Adams	"Already Alright"
	TLC	"I'm Good at Being Bad"
	Yolanda Adams	"Open My Heart"
	Ginuwine, R. L. Huggar, Tyrese & Case	"The Best Man I Can Be"
	Mary J. Blige	"The Love I Never Had"
	Yolanda Adams	"Wherever You Are"
2000	Chante Moore	"Better Than Making Love"
	Shaggy	"Dance and Shout"
	Melanie B	"Feel Me Now"
	Melanie B	"Feels So Good"
	Mýa	"Free"
	Spice Girls	"If You Wanna Have Some Fun"
	Shaggy	"Lonely Lover"
	Chante Moore	"Love's Still Alright"
	Sting	"My Funny Friend and Me"
	Spice Girls	"Oxygen"
	Cleopatra	"Who's Your woman"
	Cleopatra	"Yes This Party's Going Right"
2002	Ann Nesby	"I'm Your Friend"
	Boyz II Men	"Oh Well"
	Boyz II Men	"That's Why I Love You"
2003	Mýa	"Anatomy 1On1"
	Nodesha	"Cupid In Me"
	Nodesha	"Curious"
	Beyoncé and Bilal	"Everything I Do"
	Nodesha	"Get It While It's Hot"
	Beyoncé and (Walter Williams Sr.) the O'Jays	"He Still Loves Me"
	Faith Evans	"Heaven Knows"
	Heather Headley	"I Wish I Wasn't"
	Mýa	"Late"
	Abs	"Miss Perfect"
	Nodesha	"Sugar Boddy"
	Nodesha	"That's Crazy"
	Beyoncé, Angie Stone and Melba Moore	"Time To Come Home"
2004	Usher	"Bad Girl"
	Usher	"Seduction"
	Usher	"Simple Things"
	Usher	"That's What It's Made For"
	Usher	"Truth Hurts"
2005	Yolanda Adams	"Alwaysness"
	Yolanda Adams	"Be Blessed"
	Toni Braxton	"I Like It Like That" (Unreleased)
	Yolanda Adams	"I'm Gonna Be Ready"
	Yolanda Adams featuring Donnie McClurkin and Mary Mary	"Lift Him Up"
	Earth, Wind & Fire	"Love's Dance"
	Earth, Wind & Fire	"Pure Gold"
	Carly Simon and Megan Mullally	"The Right Thing to Do"
2006	Crystal Kay	"Kirakuni"
	Zoey	"Soakin' Wet"
	Heather Headley	"What's Not Being Said"
2008	Tiana Xiao	"Aquarium"
2008	Jyongri	"Catch Me"
2008	Tiana Xiao	"Destiny"
2008	Tiana Xiao	"Echo"
2008	Crystal Kay	"I Can't Wait"
2008	Crystal Kay	"Itoshiihito"
