= All That Matters to Me =

Single by Alexander O'Neal

from the album Love Makes No Sense
- Released: 1993
- Genre: R&B
- Length: 4:30 (album version)
- Label: Tabu
- Songwriters: Franne Golde; Allee Willis
- Producer: Steve Lindsey

Alexander O'Neal singles chronology
"Aphrodisia" (1993)	"All That Matters to Me" (1993)	"Since I've Been Lovin' You" (1993)

"All That Matters to Me" is a song written by Franne Golde and Allee Willis and recorded by American recording artist Alexander O'Neal. It was released in 1993 by Tabu Records as the fourth single from the singer's fifth solo album, Love Makes No Sense (1993). Following the successful chart performances of the Love Makes No Sense single "Love Makes No Sense", "In the Middle", and "Aphrodisia", "All That Matters to Me" was released as the album's fourth single.

The single was recorded at Ocean Way, Village Recorders, House of Soul, Capitol Studios, and Westlake Audio.

== Release ==
The song was O'Neal's 26th hit single and it reached #67 in the UK Singles Chart. "All That Matters to Me" also reached No. 51 in Germany.

== Track listing ==
- 12" single (587 723-1)
1. "All That Matters To Me (Dan's 12" Club Mix Introducing Chani Chan)" - 7:07
2. "All That Matters To Me (Serious Rope Dub)" - 7:19
3. "Aphrodisia (Morie Palma Mix)" - 6:06
4. "If You Were Here Tonight (Live)" - 3:57
- 12" single promo (AMYDJ7723)
1. "All That Matters To Me (Dan's 12" Club Mix Introducing Chani Chan)"
2. "All That Matters To Me (12" Daytime Mix)"
3. "All That Matters To Me (Serious Rope Dub)"
4. "All That Matters To Me (12" Nightime Mix)"
- 7" single (587 714-7)
1. "All That Matters To Me (Radio Mix)" - 3:42
2. "Aphrodisia (Morie Palma Edit)" - 3:33
- CD single (587 723-2)
1. "All That Matters To Me (Radio Mix)" - 3:53
2. "All That Matters To Me (Dan's 12" Club Mix Introducing Chani Chan)" - 7:10
3. "Aphrodisia (Morie Palma Mix)" - 6:05
4. "If You Were Here Tonight (Live)" - 3:57
- CD single (587 713-2)
1. "All That Matters To Me (Edit)" - 3:59
2. "Aphrodisia" - 5:18
3. "Come Correct" - 6:23

== Personnel ==
Credits are adapted from the album's liner notes.

- Alexander O'Neal - lead vocals
- Paul Jackson, Jr. - guitar
- Dean Parks - acoustic guitar
- Charles Fearing - clean up woman guitar
- Ed Greene - drums
- Bob Glaub - bass guitar
- John Barnes - piano
- Steve Lindsey - organ, synthesizer
- David Paich - organ
- Khris Kellow - wurlitzer
- Lenny Castro - percussion
- Jaydee Mannes - pedal steel
- Tony (T.A.) Warren - backing vocals
- Alex Brown - backing vocals
- Jackie Gouche - backing vocals

== Charts ==
Chart (1993)	Position
Germany (Media Control Charts)	51
UK Singles (OCC)	67
UK Airplay (ERA)	76
UK Club Chart (Music Week)	13
