= Lovin' Is Really My Game =

Single by Brainstorm

from the album Stormin'
- B-side: "Stormin'"
- Released: 1977
- Recorded: 1977
- Genre: Soul; disco
- Length: 7:39 (12"); 3:00 (7"); 3:45 (7")
- Label: Tabu Records
- Songwriter(s): Trenita Womack "Bongo Lady Way", Belita Woods
- Producer(s): Jerry Peters

"Lovin' Is Really My Game" is a 1977 song by American group Brainstorm, and is the lead single from their debut album Stormin'. The song was written by lead singer, Belita Woods along with Trenita Womack "Bongo Lady Way".

The extended version of the song was released as a vinyl 7" single in two parts; A-side part 1 and B-side part 2. "Lovin' Is Really My Game" peaked at number fourteen on both the Billboard Disco Play chart, and Hot Soul chart.

== Charts ==
=== Weekly charts ===
Chart (1977)	Peak position
US Billboard Hot Soul Singles	14
US Billboard Hot Dance Club Play	14

== Cover versions ==
- In 1978, Betty Wright recorded a cover which is included on her album Betty Wright, Live.
- In 1984, dance music performer Zino made the top 30 on the dance chart with her recording.
- In 1984, disco singer Sylvester also covered the song on his album M-1015.
- In 2000, Ann Nesby went to number one on the dance chart for one week with her recording.

== See also ==
- List of number-one dance singles of 2000 (U.S.)
