= Just the Way You Like It (The S.O.S. Band album) =

Studio album by The S.O.S. Band
- Released: August 3, 1984
- Recorded: 1983–1984; Master Sound Studio (Atlanta, Georgia); Creation Audio (Minneapolis, Minnesota)
- Genre: R&B; boogie; soul
- Length: 44:58
- Label: Tabu
- Producer: Jimmy Jam; Terry Lewis; The S.O.S. Band

The S.O.S. Band chronology
On the Rise (1983)	Just the Way You Like It (1984)	Sands of Time (1986)

Professional ratings
Review scores
Source	Rating
AllMusic	3/5 stars
The Guardian	(favourable)
People	(favourable)

Just the Way You Like It is the fifth studio album released by the R&B band The S.O.S. Band on the Tabu label in August 1984. It was produced mostly by Jimmy Jam and Terry Lewis with additional production from the band themselves.

== History ==
The band worked on its album III, which contained the song "High Hopes"- a song that was composed by Leon Sylvers III proteges Jimmy Jam and Terry Lewis. Sylvers later took them under his wing to mentor them as songwriters and producers. Tabu Records founder and CEO Clarence Avant took a liking to the song and wanted to know who was behind it. When word got back to Avant that it was the creation of Jam and Lewis, he mistakenly thought they also produced the song. When Avant asked if they wanted to work on The S.O.S. Band's next album, they offered to do so at a reduced rate in order to receive some work as producers. Instead, Avant paid them a fair amount, which lead the duo to contribute three songs to 1983's On the Rise.

== Recording ==
The band returned to the studio after Jam and Lewis were fired from The Time by Prince after being grounded in Atlanta, Georgia, because of a blizzard. As a result, the duo ended up working with the S.O.S. Band again on its next album, Just the Way You Like It. According to Jimmy Jam, the album's title track was inspired by the Southern food chain Waffle House, as he and Lewis were frequent visitors of the restaurant. The duo noticed the company's slogan at the front door and were inspired to write the song. At the time, the song was done at the request of Avant as well as Tabu's then-distributor CBS Records, which wanted a single that was similar to its previous hit for the S.O.S. Band, "Just Be Good to Me". The song only had a backing track with no lyrics and remained unfinished until Jam and Lewis grabbed a bite to eat.

Another single on the album, "No One's Gonna Love You" was Jimmy Jam's favorite song on Just the Way You Like It as well as his favorite song overall by the band. He acknowledged the influence the song had on UK bands such as Loose Ends and 52nd Street as well as it being sampled extensively since the song's initial release. Jam revealed his thoughts on rapper A$AP Rocky sampling the song as part of his 2011 single "Peso":

It’s funny, the other day my son was listening to ASAP Rocky, and I said to him, “You know that’s my song, right?” He said, “What do you mean?” I said, “The little bassline in that record is from the S.O.S. Band.” He replied, “No. I didn’t know that.” My kids are always trying to turn me on to new stuff, and they think I don’t know anything. They were trying to turn me on to ASAP Rocky, and I had to tell them I cleared the sample for him to use in the record six months earlier.

Jam and Lewis' previous works with Cherrelle and Alexander O'Neal served as the catalyst for their duets between male and female singers. The duo enlisted group member Abdul Ra'oof to sing lead with Mary Davis again- this time for the song "Weekend Girl". The song was inspired by the concept of couples whose work life took up more time than one's personal life to where the couple could only see each other on the weekend.

While most of the band members were present for the Jam and Lewis sessions, lead singer Mary Davis showed up alone to record her vocals for the song "Break Up". Although Jam and Lewis were the sole writers credited on the first half of the album's songs, Jimmy Jam mentioned that the band was fully involved in the creative process. He also noted that group members Jason Bryant and Abdul Ra'oof were the ones responsible for most of the ideas and vocal arrangements. The album was recorded and mixed at Master Sound Studio in Atlanta, Georgia, and Creation Audio in Minneapolis, Minnesota. The album was mixed by Steve Hodge, a recording engineer who previously worked at SOLAR Records and helped mix the 1976 self-titled debut album by Boston.

Over 30 years later, Jimmy Jam felt Just the Way You Like It holds up well with every other recording that the duo made throughout its career.

== Chart position ==
The album peaked at #6 on the R&B albums chart. It also reached #60 on the Billboard 200. The title track reached the Billboard R&B Top Ten, peaking at #6. The single also peaked at #64 on the Billboard Hot 100 and #32 on the UK Singles Chart. Two following singles, "No One's Gonna Love You" and "Weekend Girl", also charted on the R&B chart, reaching #15 and #40 respectively. The fourth and final single released, "Break Up", failed to chart.

== Critical reception ==
Mick Brown of The Guardian with praise wrote, "Davis's singing is one reason why the SOS Band have become quite the best pop-soul group of the moment, the deft arrangements of Lewis and Harris are another. The dance rhythms here appear to be floating above ground with no visible means of support...Schlock in excelsis."

Allmusic's Ron Wynn dismissively declared, "The signs of decline were all over this 1984 S.O.S. release...the exuberance and energy were fading...The group funk sound was losing its appeal, and the Jam/Lewis combo was beginning to stretch itself too thin."

== Reissue ==
The album was digitally remastered and reissued on CD with bonus tracks in 2013 by Demon Music Group.

== Track listing ==
All tracks are written by Terry Lewis, James Harris III, except where noted

Side one
No.	Title	Length
1.	"No One's Gonna Love You"	7:00
2.	"Weekend Girl"	6:21
3.	"Just the Way You Like It"	8:39
Total length:		22:00

Side two
No.	Title	Length
4.	"Break Up"	6:26
5.	"Feeling" (Stewart Hanley, Abdul Ra'oof, Mary Davis)	6:45
6.	"I Don't Want Nobody Else" (Jason Bryant, Sonia Rossman, Sheila Tyson)	5:59
7.	"Body Break" (Jerome Thomas, Stewart Hanley)	3:48
Total length:		22:58

2013 remastered bonus tracks
No.	Title	Writer(s)	Length
8.	"Break Up (Part 1)" (Remix)	Terry Lewis, James Harris III	6:33
9.	"Just the Way You Like It" (Like It Long Mix)	Terry Lewis, James Harris III	9:29
10.	"No One's Gonna Love You" (Special Long Version)	Terry Lewis, James Harris III	9:29
11.	"Weekend Girl" (Radio Edit)	Terry Lewis, James Harris III	4:20
12.	"I Don't Want Nobody Else" (Edit)	Jason Bryant, Sonia Rossman, Sheila Tyson	4:16

== Personnel ==
- Credits adapted from liner notes

The S.O.S. Band

- Jason Bryant – keyboards, lead vocals
- Mary Davis – lead and background vocals
- Billy Ellis – saxophone
- Sonny Killebrew – saxophone
- Abdul Ra'oof – trumpet, lead vocals
- John Simpson – bass
- Bruno Speight – guitar
- Jerome Thomas – drums, percussion

Additional Personnel

- Stewart Hanley, Jimmy Jam, Terry Lewis, Lloyd Oby – musicians
- Terry Lewis, Monte Moir, Leticia Peterson, Gwendolyn Traylor, Joyce Irby, Jimmy Jam – background vocals

== Production ==
- Jimmy Jam and Terry Lewis – producers, executive producers, vocal arrangements
- The S.O.S. Band – producers (on "Feeling", "I Don't Want Nobody Else", and "Body Break")
- Dina Andrews – production assistant
- Ron Christopher, Steve Wiese – recording engineers
- Steve Hodge – mixing
- Fred Howard – assistant engineer
- Brian Gardner – mastering
- Bunnie Ranson – management
- Ford Smith – photography

== Charts ==
Year	Chart	Peak
1984	U.S. Billboard Top Pop Albums	60
1984	U.S. Billboard Top Black Albums	6
1984	UK Pop Albums	29

Singles

Year	Single	Peak chart positions			
Year	Single	US	US R&B	US Dan	UK Pop
1984	"Just the Way You Like It"	64	6	26	32
1984	"No One's Gonna Love You"	102	15	—	—
1985	"Weekend Girl"	—	40	—	51
1985	"Break Up"	—	—	—	—
