= Stormin' =

Studio album by Brainstorm
- Released: 1977
- Recorded: 1977
- Studio: Total Experience Recording Studios (Hollywood, California)
- Genre: Soul, funk, disco
- Length: 42:39
- Label: Tabu
- Producer: Jerry Peters

Brainstorm chronology
| Stormin' (1977) | Journey to the Light (1978) |

Professional ratings
Review scores
| Source | Rating |
|---|---|
| Allmusic | 3/5 stars |

Stormin' is the debut album by the Detroit, Michigan R&B group Brainstorm. It was released in 1977 on Tabu Records and produced by Jerry Peters.

== Track listing ==
Words and music by Brainstorm; writers listed below. Arranged by Brainstorm and Jerry Peters.

1. "Lovin' Is Really My Game" (Belita Woods, Trenita Womack) - 4:59
2. "Waiting for Someone" (Trenita Womack) - 6:13
3. "This Must Be Heaven" (Charles Overton, Lamont Johnson, Robert Ross, William D. Myles) - 6:35
4. "Easy Thangs" (Lamont Johnson) - 4:48
5. "Prelude" (Jerry Peters) - 0:51
6. "Wake Up and Be Somebody" (Gerald Kent) - 6:25
7. "Stormin'" (Lamont Johnson) - 4:20
8. "We Know a Place" (Robert Ross) - 4:22
9. "Hangin' On" (Charles Overton, Gerald Kent) - 4:06

== Charts ==
| Chart (1977) | Peak position |
|---|---|
| Billboard Pop Albums | 145 |
| Billboard Top Soul Albums | 31 |

=== Singles ===
| Year | Single | Chart positions | | |
| Year | Single | US | US R&B | US Dance |
|---|---|---|---|---|
| 1977 | "Lovin' Is Really My Game" | — | 14 | 14 |
| 1977 | "Wake Up and Be Somebody" | 86 | 48 | — |
