= Funky Entertainment =

Studio album by Brainstorm
- Released: 1979
- Recorded: 1979
- Studio: Kendun Recorders, Burbank, California
- Genre: Soul/Funk
- Length: 37:43
- Label: Tabu
- Producer: Jerry Peters

Brainstorm chronology
Journey to the Light (1978)	Funky Entertainment (1979)

Professional ratings
Review scores
Source	Rating
Allmusic	3/5 stars

Funky Entertainment is the third and final album by the Detroit, Michigan R&B group Brainstorm. It was released in 1979 on Tabu Records and produced by Jerry Peters.

== Track listing ==
1. "Hot for You" - (Trenita Womack, Belita Woods) 10:48
2. "A Case of the Boogie" - (Sam Dees) 9:05
3. "Popcorn" - (Jeryl Bright, Deon Estus, Renell Gonsalves, Gerald Kent, Charles Overton, Larry Sims, Trenita Womack, Belita Woods, William L. Wooten III) 4:46
4. "Funky Entertainment" - (Gerald Kent, Charles Overton, Belita Woods) 4:12
5. "You Put a Charge in My Life" - (Lynn Mack, Jerry Peters) 4:10
6. "Don't Let Me Catch You With Your Groove Down" - (Renell Gonsalves) 4:42

== Personnel ==
- Belita Woods - lead vocals, backing vocals
- Trenita Womack - lead vocals, backing vocals, percussion, flute, piano, arrangements
- Greg Poree, Joe O'Doherty, Phil Upchurch - guitar
- Paul Jackson Jr. - guitar, sitar
- Deon Estus - bass
- Jerry Peters - keyboards, backing vocals, arrangements, conductor
- William L. Wooten III - keyboards
- Charles Overton - saxophone, backing vocals, arrangements
- Harvey Mason - drums
- Renell Gonsalves - drums, arrangements
- Stephanie Spruill - percussion
- Ernie Watts, Fred Jackson, Jr. - saxophone
- Jay DaVersa, Jerry Hey, Kenny Mason, Oscar Brashear - trumpet
- George Bohanon, Maurice Spears - trombone
- Larry Sims - horns
- Gwen Matthews, Jim Gilstrap, Syreeta Wright - backing vocals
- Ray Kelley, Nils Oliver, Paula Hochhalter, Ronald Cooper - cello

== Charts ==
=== Singles ===
Year	Single	Chart positions	
Year	Single	US R&B	US Dance
1979	"Hot For You"	65	21
1979	"You Put A Charge In My Life"	84	—
