= Journey to the Light =

Studio album by Brainstorm
- Released: 1978
- Recorded: 1978
- Studio: Total Experience Recording Studios (Hollywood, California)
- Genre: Soul; Funk
- Length: 44:35
- Label: Tabu
- Producer: Jerry Peters

Brainstorm chronology
Stormin' (1977)	Journey to the Light (1978)	Funky Entertainment (1979)

Professional ratings
Review scores
Source	Rating
AllMusic	4/5 stars

Journey to the Light is the second album by the Detroit, Michigan R&B group Brainstorm. It was released in 1978 on Tabu Records and produced by Jerry Peters.

== Track listing ==
1. "We're on Our Way Home, Pt. 1" - (Gerald Kent) 3:45
2. "Loving Just You" - (Larry Sims) 4:31
3. "Every Time I See You, I Go Wild!" - (Henry Cosby, Sylvia Moy, Stevie Wonder) 7:02
4. "Brand New Day" (Kent, Charles Overton) 3:53
5. "Journey to the Light" - (Jeryl Bright) 5:40
6. "If You Ever Need to Cry" (Belita Woods, William L. Wooten) 6:31
7. "We're on Our Way Home, Pt. 2" - (Gerald Kent) 2:50
8. "Positive Thinking" - (Deon Estus) 4:43
9. "Journey to the Light" [Disco Version] (Jeryl Bright) 5:40

== Personnel ==
- Belita Woods - lead vocals
- Deon Estus - bass
- Renell Gonsalves - drums, percussion
- Gerald Kent - guitar
- William L. Wooten III - piano, Fender Rhodes electric piano, synthesizer
- Trenita Womack - flute, percussion
- Jeryl Bright - trombone, percussion, backing vocals
- Larry Sims - trumpet, flugelhorn
- Charles Overton - alto, tenor and soprano saxophone, backing vocals

== Charts ==
Chart (1978)	Peak position
Billboard Top Soul Albums	53
