= The Finest (song) =

1986 single by the S.O.S. Band

Single by the S.O.S. Band

from the album Sands of Time
- B-side: "I Don't Want Nobody Else"
- Released: 1986
- Length: 6:06
- Label: Tabu
- Songwriter: Jimmy Jam & Terry Lewis
- Producers: Jimmy Jam & Terry Lewis

The S.O.S. Band singles chronology
"Even When You Sleep" (1986)	"The Finest" (1986)	"No Lies" (1987)

"The Finest" is a song by the American band the S.O.S. Band. It is the fifth track on their sixth studio album, Sands of Time, and is one of the group's last songs to feature the vocals of original lead singer Mary Davis. Labelmate and fellow R&B singer Alexander O'Neal shares vocals with Mary Davis during the bridge. "The Finest" was released as a single in 1986.

== Chart performance ==
"The Finest" was a success on the US Hot Black Singles chart, reaching number two and was their last entry on the Billboard Hot 100, where it peaked at number 44. On the US dance chart, "The Finest" peaked at number eight, and was also their second top-20 hit on the UK Singles Chart, reaching number 17.

== Track listings ==
7-inch single

1. "The Finest" – 4:35
2. "I Don't Want Nobody Else" – 4:19

12-inch single

1. "The Finest" (extended version) – 6:38
2. "The Finest" (instrumental) – 6:17
3. "The Finest" (a cappella) – 2:05

== Charts ==
Chart (1986)	Peak position
Belgium (Ultratop 50 Flanders)	32
Europe (European Hot 100 Singles)	19
Ireland (IRMA)	28
Netherlands (Dutch Top 40)	26
Netherlands (Single Top 100)	34
New Zealand (Recorded Music NZ)	13
UK Singles (Official Charts)	17
US Billboard Hot 100	44
US Dance Club Songs (Billboard)	8
US Dance Singles Sales (Billboard)	1
US Hot Black Singles (Billboard)	2
West Germany (GfK)	26

== "Finest Dreams" ==
"Finest Dreams"

Single by Richard X featuring Kelis

from the album Richard X Presents His X-Factor Vol. 1
- B-side: "Music for an Imaginary Mobile Phone Commercial"
- Released: August 11, 2003
- Length: 4:14
- Label: Virgin
- Songwriters: James Harris III; Terry Lewis; Philip Oakey; Philip Adrian Wright
- Producer: Richard X

Richard X singles chronology
"Being Nobody" (2002)	"Finest Dreams" (2003)

Kelis singles chronology
"Young, Fresh n' New" (2001)	"Finest Dreams" (2003)	"Milkshake" (2003)

In 2003, English mashup producer Richard X covered "The Finest" as "Finest Dreams", featuring vocals from American R&B singer-songwriter Kelis. This version is a mash-up with backing based upon an instrumental remix of the Human League track "The Things That Dreams Are Made Of".

The song was released on August 11, 2003, in the United Kingdom as the third single from Richard X's debut album, Richard X Presents His X-Factor Vol. 1. The single peaked at number eight on the UK Singles Chart the week ending August 23, 2003, and also reached number 35 in Ireland. The music video was directed by Oli Goldsmith.

=== Track listings ===
UK CD and 12-inch single; Australian CD single

1. "Finest Dreams" (featuring Kelis) – 4:14
2. "Finest Dreams" (Part Two featuring Kelis) – 5:15
3. "Music for an Imaginary Mobile Phone Commercial" – 3:05

European CD single

1. "Finest Dreams" (featuring Kelis) – 4:14
2. "Finest Dreams" (Part Two featuring Kelis) – 5:15

=== Charts ===
Chart (2003)	Peak position
Australia Hitseekers (ARIA)	14
Belgium (Ultratip Bubbling Under Flanders)	6
Belgium Dance (Ultratop Flanders)	10
Ireland (IRMA)	35
Ireland Dance (IRMA)	6
Scottish Singles Sales (Official Charts)	15
UK Singles (Official Charts)	8
UK Dance (Official Charts)	3

=== Release history ===
Region	Date	Format(s)	Label(s)	Ref.
United Kingdom	August 11, 2003	12-inch vinyl; CD	Virgin	
Australia	September 29, 2003	CD	Virgin	

== Other cover versions ==
Italian producer Roberto Surace's 2019 track "Joys" sampled a re-recorded version of "The Finest". "Joys", released on Defected Records, reached number 90 on the UK Singles Chart in November 2019.

=== Charts ===
Chart (2019)	Peak position
UK Singles (OCC)	90
UK Dance (OCC)	14
