= Love Makes No Sense =

Studio album by Alexander O'Neal
- Released: February 9, 1993
- Recorded: July–November 1992
- Length: 50:47
- Label: Tabu; A&M
- Producer: Steve Lindsey; Jon Nettlesbey; Terry Coffey; Christopher Troy; Zac Harmon; Lance Alexander; Prof T.

Alexander O'Neal chronology
This Thing Called Love: The Greatest Hits of Alexander O'Neal (1992)	Love Makes No Sense (1993)	The Best of Alexander O'Neal (1995)

Professional ratings
Review scores
Source	Rating
AllMusic	3/5 stars
Music Week	3/5 stars
Select	2/5 medals

Love Makes No Sense is the fifth studio album by American recording artist Alexander O'Neal. The album was O'Neal's final release for Tabu, and his first album made without formal production from Jimmy Jam and Terry Lewis.

Sales of the album were not as strong as O'Neal's earlier releases; it went on to peak at number 89 on the US Billboard 200 and reached number 18 on Top R&B/Hip-Hop Albums. The album launched three charting singles in the United Kingdom: "Love Makes No Sense" peaked at number 26 on the UK Singles Chart; "In the Middle" peaked at number 32; "All That Matters to Me" peaked at number 67. It was O'Neal's first album not to be certified by the BPI, since his 1988 Christmas album, My Gift to You. "All That Matters to Me" and "Since I've Been Loving You" were his fifth and sixth (and last to date) charting songs in Germany, both peaking at number 51.

Love Makes No Sense was re-released in 2013 on Tabu's new Re-born imprint, featuring rare bonus content. The reissue is a two-CD set with the original album digitally remastered from the original half-inch mix tapes; the bonus content consists of associated 7-inch and 12-inch mixes.

== Track listing ==
No.	Title	Writer(s)	Length
1.	"In the Middle"	Terry Coffey; Jon Nettlesbey	4:37
2.	"If U Let It"	Tony Tolbert; Lance Alexander	5:14
3.	"Aphrodisia"	Tolbert; Alexander	5:18
4.	"Love Makes No Sense"	Tolbert; Alexander	6:58
5.	"Home Is Where the Heart Is"	Christopher Troy; Zac Harmon	6:16
6.	"Change of Heart"	Troy; Harmon; Dianne Quander	4:44
7.	"Lady"	Tolbert; Alexander	5:35
8.	"All That Matters to Me"	Franne Golde; Allee Willis	4:30
9.	"Since I've Been Loving You"	Golde; Michael Bolton	4:00
10.	"Your Precious Love" (with Cherrelle)	Nickolas Ashford; Valerie Simpson	3:36
11.	"What a Wonderful World"	George David Weiss; Bob Thiele	5:12

Note

- Track 11 included on some European and Japanese versions only.

== Personnel ==
Credits are adapted from the album's liner notes.

- Alexander O'Neal – lead and background vocals
- Cherrelle – lead and background vocals
- JayDee Mannes – steel guitar; pedal
- Paul Jackson Jr. – guitars
- Charles Fearing – guitars
- Kevin Pierce – guitars
- Dean Parks – acoustic guitar
- Ed Greene – drums; tambourine
- Bernard Purdie – drums
- Christopher Troy – drum programming; piano; keyboards; Moog synthesizer; percussion
- Zac Harmon – drum programming; keyboards; percussion
- Lance Alexander – drum programming; keyboards; percussion
- Jon Nettlesbey – drum programming; percussion
- Khris Kellow – Wurlitzer electric piano
- Bob Glaub – bass guitar
- Freddie Washington – bass guitar
- Steve Lindsey – organ; piano; synthesizer
- Terry Coffey – synthesizer; keyboards
- Enrico De Paoli – synthesizer
- Randy Kerber – synthesizer
- Booker T. Jones – organ
- David Paich – organ
- Jim Cox – piano
- John Barnes – piano
- Derrick Edmondson – saxophone
- Brandon Fields – saxophone
- M.G. – finger snaps
- Franklin Wharton – flute
- Lenny Castro – percussion
- Oren Waters – backing vocals
- Prof T. – backing vocals
- Alex Brown – backing vocals
- Barrington Scott – backing vocals
- Carrie Harrington – backing vocals
- Jackie Gouche – backing vocals
- Jamecia Bennett – backing vocals
- Joey Diggs – backing vocals
- Joey Elias – backing vocals
- Julia Tillman Waters – backing vocals
- Maxine Willard Waters – backing vocals
- Sean Devereaux – backing vocals
- Tony Warren – backing vocals
- Valerie Davis – backing vocals

== Charts ==
Chart performance for Love Makes No Sense
Chart (1988)	Peak position
Dutch Albums (Album Top 100)	45
Swedish Albums (Sverigetopplistan)	49
UK Albums (OCC)	14
US Billboard 200	99
US Top R&B/Hip-Hop Albums (Billboard)	18

== Release history ==
Label	Cat. No.		Format	Date
Tabu	31454 9501	^{US}	CD, Cassette	1993
Tabu	POCM-1016	^{JP}	CD	1993
Tabu	549 502	^{EU}	CD, Vinyl, Cassette	1993
Solid	CDSOL-5226	^{JP}	CD	2013
Tabu	TABU 2017	^{UK}	CD	2013
