= One of Many Nights =

Studio album by the S.O.S. Band
- Released: September 24, 1991
- Genre: R&B; funk; soul
- Length: 55:14
- Label: Tabu; A&M
- Producer: Curtis Williams

The S.O.S. Band chronology
Diamonds in the Raw (1989)	One of Many Nights (1991)

One of Many Nights is the eighth and final studio album by the S.O.S. Band. It was released by Tabu Records in 1991. It includes the songs "Are You Ready", "Get Hyped on This" and "Someone I Can Love".

The single, "Sometimes I Wonder", peaked at No. 12 on the Billboard Hot R&B Singles chart.

== Production ==
One of Many Nights was produced by Curtis Williams. It contains the first recorded appearances of the rapper Kurupt, before he signed a recording contract with Death Row Records. The album cover art was created by A&M Records co-founder Herb Alpert.

== Critical reception ==
Professional ratings
Review scores
Source	Rating
AllMusic	2/5 stars
The Encyclopedia of Popular Music	3/5 stars
The Rolling Stone Album Guide	3/5 stars

The Indianapolis Star called the album "a major disappointment," writing that "many of the 10 tracks suffer from rhythmic sameness, as if the writers and producers are locked on a particular beat."

== Track listing ==
#	Title	Writer(s)	Length
1.	I Wanna Be the One	K. Lynette Patterson, Curtis F. Williams	5:27
2.	Sometimes I Wonder	K. Lynette Patterson, Curtis F. Williams	4:50
3.	Broken Promises	Chandra Currelley, Jimmy Randolph	5:01
4.	How Can We Ever Get Back Together	Chandra Currelley, Curtis F. Williams	5:41
5.	Are You Ready	Ricardo Brown, Larry Gittens, Curtis F. Williams	4:53
6.	Can't Explain	K. Lynette Patterson Curtis F. Williams	5:28
7.	Someone I Can Love	Ricardo Brown, Tony Haynes, Curtis F. Williams	5:35
8.	Get Hyped on This	Ricardo Brown, Chandra Currelley, Curtis F. Williams	5:38
9.	I Only Want You	Larry Gittens, Curtis F. Williams	5:24
10.	One of Many Nights	Tony Haynes, Curtis F. Williams	7:17

== Personnel ==
- Bruno Speight – guitars, percussion
- Abdul Raoof – trumpet, percussion, background vocals
- Jason Bryant – organ
- Chandra Currelley – lead and background vocals

Additional personnel

- Marcus Williams – drums, percussion
- Gregory "Milkshake" Mayfield – trumpet
- Sultan Mohammad – tenor saxophone
- Lloyd L. Oby, Jr. – trombone
- Rodrick Smith – alto saxophone
- George "Spike" Neely, David Koenig, Eric Vaughn – percussion
- Curtis Williams – percussion, keyboards, drum programming, saxophone, piano, background vocals
- Larry Gittens – percussion, flugelhorn
- Kurupt – vocals
- Lorena Shelby, Carmen Carter – background vocals
