= S.O.S. (The S.O.S. Band album) =

Studio album by The S.O.S. Band
- Released: June 6, 1980
- Recorded: 1979
- Studio: Web IV Studios, Apogee Studios, Axis Studios (Atlanta, Georgia)
- Genre: R&B; funk; disco; boogie
- Length: 40:02
- Label: Tabu
- Producer: Sigidi

The S.O.S. Band chronology
S.O.S. (1980)	Too (1981)

Singles from S.O.S.
- 1. "Take Your Time (Do It Right)" Released: March 18, 1980; 2. "S.O.S. (Dit Dit Dit Dash Dash Dash Dit Dit Dit)" Released: September 10, 1980; 3. "What's Wrong with Our Love Affair?" Released: December 10, 1980

Professional ratings
Review scores
Source	Rating
AllMusic	4/5 stars
Smash Hits	4/10

S.O.S. is the debut album released by the R&B band the S.O.S. Band on the Tabu label in the summer of 1980. It was produced by Sigidi Abdullah.

The album was a hit at nightclubs and "Take Your Time (Do It Right)" became a disco classic.

== History ==
The album peaked at No. 2 on the R&B albums chart. It also reached No. 12 on the Billboard 200. The album yielded the Billboard R&B number-one hit "Take Your Time (Do It Right)" which also peaked at No. 3 on the Billboard Hot 100, No. 1 on the Hot Dance Club Play chart, and No. 51 on the UK Singles Chart. Two following singles, "S.O.S. (Dit Dit Dit Dash Dash Dash Dit Dit Dit)" and "What's Wrong with Our Love Affair?", also charted on the R&B chart, reaching numbers 20 and 87 respectively. The album was digitally remastered and reissued on CD with bonus tracks in 2013 by Demon Music Group.

== Track listing ==
Side one
No.	Title	Writer(s)	Length
1.	"S.O.S. (Dit Dit Dit Dash Dash Dash Dit Dit Dit)"	S.O.S. Band, Sigidi	5:43
2.	"What's Wrong with Our Love Affair?"	Jason Bryant	4:50
3.	"Open Letter"	Sigidi, Rhonghea Southern	4:29
4.	"Love Won't Wait for Love"	Sigidi, Crystal McCrarey	5:11

Side two
No.	Title	Writer(s)	Length
5.	"Take Your Time (Do It Right)"	Harold Clayton, Sigidi	7:40
6.	"I'm in Love"	Robert Eugene Daniels	3:36
7.	"Take Love Where You Find It"	John Alexander Simpson, Bruno Speight	5:55
8.	"S.O.S. (Reprise)"	S.O.S. Band, Sigidi	1:50

2013 remastered bonus tracks
No.	Title	Writer(s)	Length
9.	"S.O.S. (Dit Dit Dit Dash Dash Dash Dit Dit Dit)" (Edit)	S.O.S. Band, Sigidi	4:04
10.	"S.O.S. (Dit Dit Dit Dash Dash Dash Dit Dit Dit)" (Special Disco Mix)	S.O.S. Band, Sigidi	7:37
11.	"Take Your Time (Do It Right)" (Part 1)	Harold Clayton, Sigidi	3:13
12.	"Take Your Time (Do It Right)" (Part 2)	Harold Clayton, Sigidi	4:12
13.	"Take Your Time (Do It Right)" (Long Version)	Harold Clayton, Sigidi	7:37
14.	"What's Wrong with Our Love Affair?" (Edit)	Jason Bryant	3:54

== Personnel ==
The S.O.S. Band

- Jason "T.C." Bryant – keyboards, vocals
- Billy "B.E." Ellis – saxophone, keyboards, vocals
- Mary Davis – vocals, background vocals, percussion
- James Earl Jones III – drums, vocals
- Willie "Sonny" Killebrew – saxophone, flute, vocals
- Bruno Speight – lead guitar
- John Alexander Simpson – bass, vocals

Additional Personnel

- James Stroud – drums (on "Love Won't Wait for Love")
- Darryl "Munyungo" Jackson – percussion
- Maceo Parker, Fred Wesley, Larry Hatcher, David Li, Richard Griffith, Ray Brown, Jr., Nolan Smith, Jeff Clayton – horns
- Bill Henderson (concertmaster) – strings
- Rosalind Sweeper, Freddi Rawls, Michele Morgan, Gertha Simms – background vocals
- Dorothy Farrell, Linda Riley, Pam Jones, Isaac Welcome, Angela (Neicy) Hall, Grace Anderson, Charlene Few – handclaps

== Production ==
- Sigidi – producer, arranger
- Clarence Avant – executive producer
- Fred Wesley, The S.O.S. Band – arrangers
- Richard Wells, Ted Bush, Tom Race, George Pappas – engineers
- Tommy Cooper, Greg Webster – assistant engineers
- David Hassinger, Serge Reyes, Rhonghea Southern – mixers
- Neil Petinov – assistant mixer
- Mike Reese – mastering

== Charts ==
Chart (1980)	Peak
U.S. Billboard 200	12
U.S. Billboard Top R&B/Hip-Hop Albums	2

Singles

Year	Single	Peak chart positions			
Year	Single	US	US R&B	US Dan	UK
1980	"Take Your Time (Do It Right)"	3	1	1	51
1980	"S.O.S. (Dit Dit Dit Dash Dash Dash Dit Dit Dit)"	—	20	54	—
1980	"What's Wrong with Our Love Affair?"	—	87	—	—
