= Too (S.O.S. Band album) =

Studio album by The S.O.S. Band
- Released: July 31, 1981
- Studio: Spectrum (Venice); Larrabee (Los Angeles); Axis Sound (Atlanta); Web IV (Atlanta); Ocean Way (Hollywood); Paramount (Hollywood); Rumbo (Canoga Park); The Sound Castle (Los Angeles)
- Genre: Funk; disco; boogie; urban
- Length: 42:01
- Label: Tabu
- Producer: Sigidi

The S.O.S. Band chronology
S.O.S. (1980)	Too (1981)	III (1982)

Professional ratings
Review scores
Source	Rating
AllMusic	3/5 stars

Too is the second album by the R&B band the S.O.S. Band, released on the Tabu label in July 1981. It was produced by Sigidi Abdullah.

== History ==
The album peaked at #30 on the R&B albums chart. It also reached #117 on the Billboard 200. The album yielded two Billboard R&B chart singles, "Do It Now (Part 1)" and "You" They peaked at #15 and #64 respectively. The album was digitally remastered and reissued on CD with bonus tracks in 2013 by Demon Music Group.

== Track listing ==
Side one
No.	Title	Writer(s)	Length
1.	"It's a Long Way to the Top"	Arnell Carmichael	4:12
2.	"Do It Now"	Mbaji, Rhonghea, Sigidi	7:03
3.	"There Is No Limit"	Mary Davis, Rhonghea, Sigidi, John Simpson	5:15
4.	"You"	Allen Simpson, John Simpson, Bruno Speight	4:21

Side two
No.	Title	Writer(s)	Length
5.	"Stay"	Louis Price, Reed Burkholder, Robert Williams	4:31
6.	"Are You Ready?"	Mary Davis, John Simpson, Sigidi	5:01
7.	"Do You Know Where Your Children Are?"	John Simpson, Bruno Speight	3:30
8.	"For the Brothers That Ain't Here"	John Simpson, Bruno Speight, Sigidi	4:23
9.	"Unborn Child"	Lana Bogan, James Seals	3:45

2013 remastered bonus tracks
No.	Title	Writer(s)	Length
10.	"Do It Now" (Long Version)	Mbaji, Rhonghea, Sigidi	7:07
11.	"Do It Now" (Part 1)	Mbaji, Rhonghea, Sigidi	4:03
12.	"Do It Now" (Part 1 - Short Version)	Mbaji, Rhonghea, Sigidi	3:22
13.	"Do It Now" (Part 2)	Mbaji, Rhonghea, Sigidi	3:58
14.	"You" (Long Version)	Allen Simpson, John Simpson, Bruno Speight	5:55
15.	"There Is No Limit" (Long Version)	Mary Davis, Rhonghea, Sigidi, John Simpson	6:17

== Personnel ==
The S.O.S. Band

- Jason Bryant – keyboards, vocals
- Billy Ellis – saxophone, vocals
- John Alexander Simpson – bass, vocals
- Mary Davis – vocals, percussion
- James Earl Jones – drums, vocals
- W. Sonny Killebrew – saxophone, flute, vocals
- Bruno Speight guitar, vocals
- Abdul Ra'oof – trumpet, trombone, vocals

Additional Personnel

- Travis Biggs – keyboards, flute, harp
- Fred Wesley – trombone
- Darryl "Munyungo" Jackson – percussion
- David Majal Li – alto saxophone
- Rhonghea Southern – guitar, background vocals
- Phyllis "Penny" Wanzo, Rosalyn Sweeper, Fredi Grace, Keith Rawls – background vocals
- Ben Picone, William Henderson (concertmasters) – strings

== Production ==
- Sigidi – producer
- Clarence Avant – executive producer
- Steve Williams – chief engineer
- Les Horn; Assistant engineer
- Fred Wesley – horns and strings arrangements
- Joe Q. Hall, Scott Skidmore, Sabrina Buchanek, Peter Damski, Les Horn, Greg Webster, Richard Wells, Mark Ettle, Tony Chiappa, Louis Summers, Les Cooper, Mitch Gibson – assistant engineers
- Steve Marcussen – mastering
- Art Sims, 11:24 Design – art direction
- Don Miller – photography (front cover)
- David Randale – photography (back cover)
- Nick Fasciano – logo sculpture

== Charts ==
Chart (1981)	Peak
U.S. Billboard Top LPs	117
U.S. Billboard Top Soul LPs	30

Singles

Year	Single	US R&B
1981	"Do It Now (Part 1)"	15
1981	"You"	64
