= Lil Boat =

Lil Boat may refer to:

- Lil Yachty, American artist and rapper also known as Lil Boat
- Lil Boat (mixtape), the debut commercial mixtape by Lil Yachty, 2016
- Lil Boat 2, second studio album by Lil Yachty, 2018
- Lil Boat 3, the fourth studio album by Lil Yachty, 2020

== See also ==
- "Lil Red Boat", a 1998 song by Angel Grant
