= Take Your Time (Do It Right) =

Debut single by the S.O.S. Band

- A-side label of US 12-inch vinyl single

Single by The S.O.S. Band

from the album S.O.S.
- A-side: "Take Your Time (Do It Right) Part 1"
- B-side: "Take Your Time (Do It Right) Part 2"
- Released: March 18, 1980
- Recorded: 1979
- Genre: Post-disco; boogie; funk
- Length: 7:40 (album version); 3:13 (single edit)
- Label: Tabu
- Songwriters: Harold Clayton; Sigidi
- Producer: Sigidi

The S.O.S. Band singles chronology
"Take Your Time (Do It Right)" (1980)	"S.O.S. (Dit Dit Dit Dash Dash Dash Dit Dit Dit)" (1980)

"Take Your Time (Do It Right)" is the debut single by American R&B group the S.O.S. Band. It was released as the lead single from their debut studio album, S.O.S. (1980) on March 18, 1980, through Tabu Records, three months before the album's release. "Take Your Time (Do It Right)" peaked at number one on the US Cash Box Top 100 and number three on the US Billboard Hot 100, becoming a disco hit.

== Chart performance ==
In the United States, it reached the number-one spot on the Billboard R&B singles chart and number three on the Billboard Hot 100 in mid-1980. On the Billboard dance chart, it went to number one for four non-consecutive weeks. The single was certified platinum by the RIAA for sales of one million copies. It spent five months (21 weeks) on the US charts. "Take Your Time (Do It Right)" was a worldwide hit; however, only in New Zealand did its popularity match that of the US, peaking there likewise at number three. It was moderately successful elsewhere, reaching number 40 in Australia, number 27 in Canada and number 10 in Norway. In the UK it missed the top 40 entirely, peaking at number 51. It is ranked as the 36th biggest American hit of 1980, and the 42nd in New Zealand.

== Charts ==
=== Weekly charts ===
Chart (1980)	Peak position
Australia (Kent Music Report)	40
Belgium (VRT Top 30 Flanders)	19
Canada Top Singles (RPM)	27
Netherlands (Dutch Top 40)	26
New Zealand (Recorded Music NZ)	3
Norway (VG-lista)	10
Sweden (Sverigetopplistan)	20
UK Singles (OCC)	51
US Billboard Hot 100	3
US Disco Top 100 (Billboard)	1
US Hot Soul Singles (Billboard)	1
US Cash Box Top 100	1

=== Year-end charts ===
Chart (1980)	Position
New Zealand (Recorded Music NZ)	42
US Top Pop Singles (Billboard)	37
US Cash Box Top 100	16

== Max-A-Million version ==
"Take Your Time (Do It Right)"

Single by Max-A-Million

from the album Take Your Time
- Released: July 5, 1995
- Recorded: 1994
- Genre: Eurodance
- Length: 3:39
- Label: SOS
- Songwriters: Harold Clayton, Sigidi
- Producer: 20 Fingers

Max-A-Million singles chronology
"Fat Boy" (1994)	"Take Your Time (Do It Right)" (1995)	"Sexual Healing" (1995)

In 1994, American group Max-A-Million recorded the song for their debut and only album, Take Your Time (1995). It was produced by 20 Fingers and released in July 1995 by SOS Records, reaching the top 20 on the US Billboard Hot Dance Club Play chart. The song also peaked at numbers 64 and 65 on the Billboard Hot 100 and Cash Box Top 100 charts.

=== Track listing ===
- CD-Maxi
1. Take Your Time (Do It Right) (Radio Mix) 3:39
2. Take Your Time (Do It Right) (Charlie's Mix) 4:35
3. Take Your Time (Do It Right) (Extended Mix) 5:41
4. Take Your Time (Do It Right) (Euro Mix) 4:44
5. Take Your Time (Do It Right) (J.J.'s Club Mix) 4:47
6. Take Your Time (Do It Right) (Do It Underground) 6:36
7. Take Your Time (Do It Right) (Onofrio's Message) 6:33

=== Charts ===
Chart (1995)	Peak position
US Billboard Hot 100	64
US Hot Dance Music/Club Play (Billboard)	18
US Maxi-Singles Sales (Billboard)	31
US Cash Box Top 100	65

== See also ==
- List of 1980s one-hit wonders in the United States
- List of Cash Box Top 100 number-one singles of 1980
- List of number-one R&B singles of 1980 (U.S.)
