= III (S.O.S. Band album) =

Studio album by The S.O.S. Band
- Released: October 29, 1982
- Recorded: Master Sound (Atlanta, Georgia); Axis Recording (Atlanta, Georgia); Sound Masters (Los Angeles, California); Larrabee Sound (Los Angeles, California)
- Genre: Funk, R&B
- Length: 44:50
- Label: Tabu
- Producer: Ricky Sylvers; Gene Dozier

The S.O.S. Band chronology
Too (1981)	III (1982)	On the Rise (1983)

Professional ratings
Review scores
Source	Rating
AllMusic	2.5/5 stars

III is the third album by the R&B band the S.O.S. Band, released on the Tabu label in October 1982. It was produced by Ricky Sylvers and Gene Dozier.

== History ==
The album peaked at #27 on the R&B albums chart. It also reached #172 on the Billboard 200. The album yielded two Billboard R&B chart singles, "High Hopes" and "Have It Your Way", each peaking at #25 and #57 respectively. "High Hopes" also reached #49 on the Hot Dance Club Play chart. The third single, "Groovin' (That's What We're Doin')", peaked at #47 on the Hot Dance Club Play chart and #72 on the UK Singles Chart.

"High Hopes" is notable for being the first collaboration between the group and Jimmy Jam and Terry Lewis, who would go on to write and produce several hits for the group. The album was digitally remastered and reissued on CD with bonus tracks in 2013 by Demon Music Group.

== Track listing ==
Side one
No.	Title	Writer(s)	Length
1.	"Can't Get Enough"	Charmaine Sylvers, Glen Barbee	5:45
2.	"High Hopes"	Jimmy Harris, Terry Lewis	6:29
3.	"Have It Your Way"	John Simpson	5:07
4.	"Your Love (It's the One for Me)"	Crystal McCarey, Gene Dozier	5:18

Side two
No.	Title	Writer(s)	Length
5.	"Good & Plenty"	Bruno Speight, John Simpson, Gene Dozier, Charmaine Sylvers	4:24
6.	"Looking for You"	John Simpson, Bruno Speight, Karen Krattinger, Allen Simpson	4:27
7.	"These Are the Things"	Mary Davis, Travis Biggs, John Simpson	4:47
8.	"You Shake Me Up"	Jason Bryant, Gene Dozier	4:00
9.	"Groovin' (That's What We're Doin')"	Charmaine Sylvers, Gene Dozier	4:28

2013 remastered bonus tracks
No.	Title	Writer(s)	Length
10.	"High Hopes" (Edit)	Jimmy Harris, Terry Lewis	5:30
11.	"Good & Plenty" (7" Version)	Bruno Speight, John Simpson, Gene Dozier, Charmaine Sylvers	3:56
12.	"Good & Plenty" (12" Version)	Bruno Speight, John Simpson, Gene Dozier, Charmaine Sylvers	5:29
13.	"Groovin' (That's What We're Doin')" (Special Version)	Charmaine Sylvers, Gene Dozier	5:31
14.	"Your Love (It's the One for Me)" (US 12" Version)	Crystal McCarey, Gene Dozier	6:14

== Personnel ==
The S.O.S. Band

- Mary Davis – lead vocals, background vocals
- Jason Bryant – keyboards, vocoder, lead vocals, background vocals
- Abdul Ra'oof – trumpet, flugelhorn, percussion, lead vocals, background vocals
- Billy Ellis – saxophone
- John Simpson – bass, background vocals
- Bruno Speight – rhythm guitar, lead guitar, background vocals
- Jerome "JT" Thomas – drums, percussion
- Willie "Sonny" Killebrew – saxophone

Additional Personnel

- William Shelby, Leon F. Sylvers III, Joey Gallo – keyboards
- Crystal McCarey, Ricky Sylvers, Gene Dozier – background vocals

== Production ==
- Ricky Sylvers, Gene Dozier – producers
- Leon F. Sylvers – executive producer
- Ron Christopher – recording engineer
- Steve Hodge – recording engineer, mixing engineer
- Wally Traugott – mastering engineer
- Diem Jones – photography
- Jones & Armitage – design

== Charts ==
Albums

Chart (1982)	Peak
U.S. Billboard 200	172
U.S. Billboard Black Albums	27

Singles

Year	Single	Peak chart positions		
Year	Single	US R&B	US Dan	UK
1982	"High Hopes"	25	49	—
1983	"Have It Your Way"	57	—	—
1983	"Groovin' (That's What We're Doin')"	—	47	72
