= Lamont Johnson (fretless bassist) =

American musician (1955–2024)

Eugene Lamont Johnson (April 20, 1955 - November 27, 2024), commonly known as E Lamont Johnson or Lamont Johnson, was an American musician. Born in Highland Park, Michigan, he became the electric fretless bassist of the Detroit-based R&B band Brainstorm, performing on the group's debut album, Stormin' and also serving as co-lead singer on their Quiet Storm classic composition "This Must Be Heaven".

As a result of his electric fretless bass work throughout the mid-1970s, he gained recognition for being the first internationally recognized electric fretless bassist in R&B music. After leaving Brainstorm in 1978, prior to the group's second album, he began recording with a slew of other artists, in addition to recording a solo album for CBS Records (featuring his own version of "This Must Be Heaven"). He recorded an album with American disco group Niteflyte for Ariola Records.

He later became a notable bass instructor in the Detroit area, and many have sought his electric bass instruction.

Johnson died on November 27, 2024.

== Discography ==
=== Studio albums ===
==== Solo album ====
- 1978: Music of The Sun

==== With other groups ====
- 1977: Together (with Gloster Williams & The King James Version)
- 1977: Stormin' (With Brainstorm)
- 1978: On My Way (with Hamilton Bohannon)
- 1978: First Time Out (with Jimmy McKee)
- 1978: Physical Attraction (with Keith Barrow)
- 1979: Niteflyte (with Niteflyte)
- 1979: Chapter 8 (with Chapter 8)
- 1981: Was (Not Was) (with Was (Not Was))
- 1985: Double Dip (with Robert Lowe)

=== Singles ===
- 1978: "Sister Fine"
- 1978: "Hey Girl"
- 1979: "If You Want It" (With Niteflyte)
- 1980: "Masta Luva"
- 1980: "Rock You Baby"
- 1984: "The Heart Is a Hunter" (With The Stingrays)
