= Jam & Lewis: Volume One =

2021 studio album by Jimmy Jam & Terry Lewis

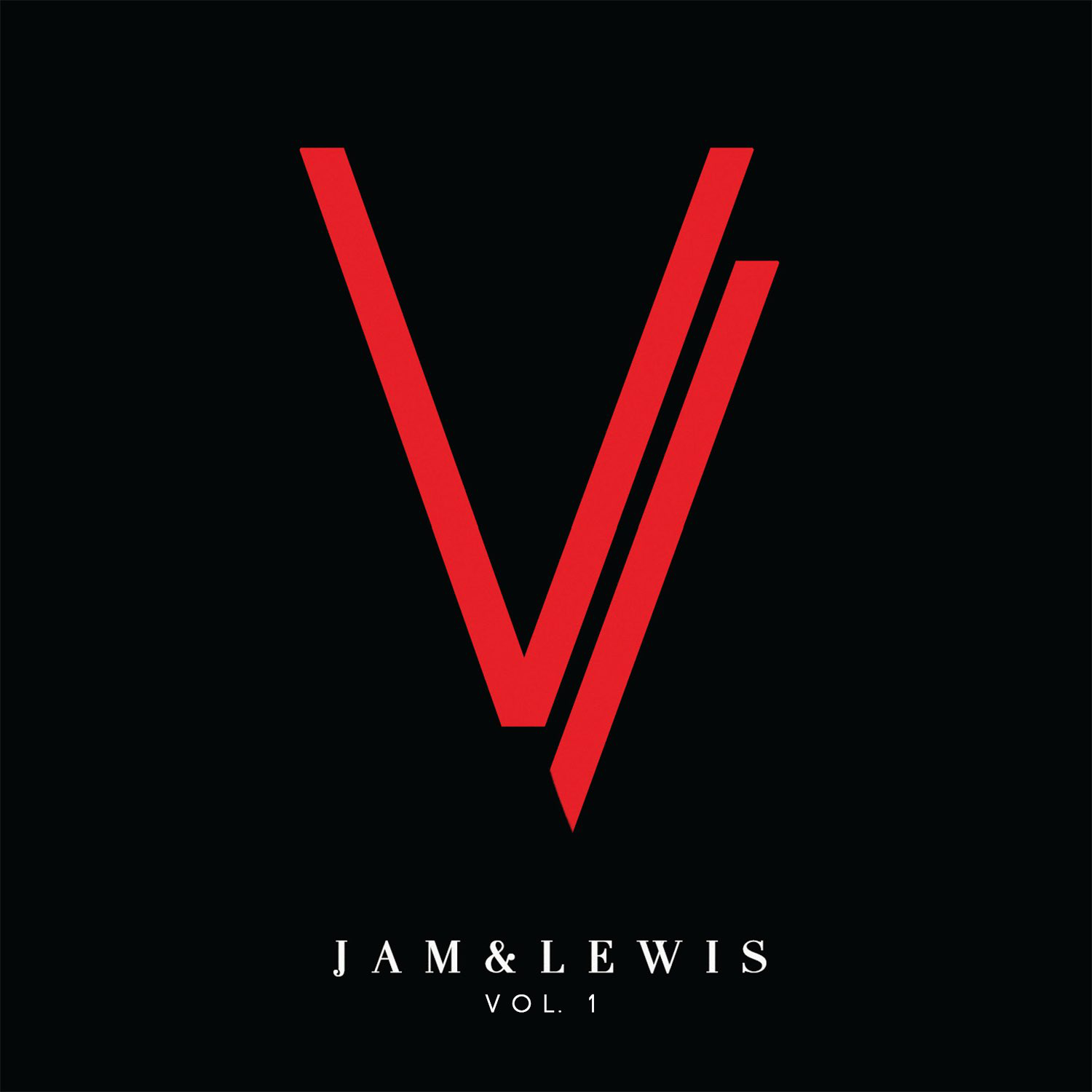

Studio album by Jimmy Jam and Terry Lewis
- Released: July 9, 2021
- Studio: Flyte Tyme Studios, Agoura Hills, CA | The Village Studios, Los Angeles, CA | Capitol Studios, Hollywood, CA | The Butterfly Lounge, Atlanta, GA | The Moroccan Room East, New York, NY
- Length: 48:28
- Label: Flyte Tyme; BMG
- Producer: Jimmy Jam and Terry Lewis

Singles from Jam & Lewis: Volume One
- 1. "Til I Found You" Released: April 12, 2019; 2. "He Don't Know Nothin' Bout It" Released: November 13, 2020; 3. "Somewhat Loved" Released: June 10, 2021

Jam & Lewis: Volume One is the debut studio album by American R&B production duo Jimmy Jam and Terry Lewis. It was released through their label Flyte Tyme Records in conjunction with BMG on July 9, 2021.

The album contains guest appearances, including Sounds of Blackness, Boyz II Men, Mariah Carey, Babyface, Heather Headley, Charlie Wilson, Usher, Mary J. Blige, Toni Braxton and Morris Day, Jerome and the Roots.

== Background and release ==
In April 2019, Jimmy Jam and Terry Lewis announced that they were preparing their first album as recording artists, which include "iconic collaborations spanning their influential discography" and "awe inspiring performances". As they signed with BMG Rights Management, they announced its release year in 2021.

== Promotion ==
Jam and Lewis performed "He Don't Know Nothin' Bout It" with Babyface at The Tonight Show with Jimmy Fallon on January 18, 2021. A week later, they performed the song again at Tamron Hall on January 25.

=== Singles ===
Their debut single, "Til I Found You", which features Sounds of Blackness alongside Ann Nesby, Lauren Evans and James "Big Jim" Wright, was released as the first single from the album on April 12, 2019. The song reached number 21 on the US Gospel Airplay chart, and number 22 on the US Adult R&B Songs chart.

The second single, "He Don't Know Nothin' Bout It", featuring Babyface, was released on November 13, 2020. The song reached number 16 on the US Hot R&B Songs chart, and number four on the US Adult R&B Songs chart.

The third single, "Somewhat Loved", featuring Mariah Carey, was released on June 10, 2021. The song reached number 10 on the US Adult R&B Songs chart.

== Track listing ==
Jam & Lewis: Volume One track listing
No.	Title	Writer(s)	Length
1.	"Til I Found You" (with Sounds of Blackness)	James Harris III; Terry Lewis; James Wright	5:15
2.	"Spinnin" (featuring Mary J. Blige)	Harris III; Lewis; Mary J. Blige	3:49
3.	"The Next Best Day" (featuring Boyz II Men)	Harris III; Lewis; Nathan Morris; Shawn Stockman; Wanya Morris	5:06
4.	"Somewhat Loved (There You Go Breakin' My Heart)" (featuring Mariah Carey)	Harris III; Lewis; Mariah Carey; Terius Nash	3:53
5.	"He Don't Know Nothin' Bout It" (with Babyface)	Harris III; Lewis; Kenneth "Babyface" Edmonds	5:29
6.	"Happily Unhappy" (featuring Toni Braxton)	Harris III; Lewis; Toni Braxton	6:09
7.	"Maybe I've Changed (Or Did You)" (featuring Heather Headley)	Harris III; Lewis; Wright; Heather Headley	4:46
8.	"Do What I Do" (featuring Charlie Wilson)	Harris III; Lewis; Charles Wilson	4:17
9.	"Do It Yourself" (with Usher)	Harris III; Lewis; Bobby Avila; Issiah Avila; Usher Raymond IV	4:36
10.	"Babylove" (featuring Morris Day, Jerome and The Roots)	Harris III; Lewis; Morris Day; Jerome Benton; Ahmir Thompson; Abdul Basit; Kamal Gray; Tariq Trotter	5:08
Total length:			48:28

== Personnel ==
Credits adapted from the CD liner notes

- Jimmy Jam - producer, engineer (3–5, 8, 10)
- Terry Lewis - producer, engineer (1–6, 8–10)
- Christian Plata - engineer (1), assistant engineer (5), mixing at Flyte Tyme Studios, Agoura Hills, CA (1)
- Matt Marrin - engineer (2, 6–8), assistant engineer (5)
- John Jackson - engineer (2, 4)
- Brant Biles - mixing at Flyte Tyme Studios, Agoura Hills, CA (2–10)
- Steve Genewick - strings engineer (3)
- Jeff Fitzpatrick - 2nd strings engineer (3)
- Brian Garten - vocal engineer (4)
- Steve Hodge - engineer (5, 10)
- Xavier Smith - assistant engineer (5, 10)
- Sergiio - Talkbox (8)
- Herb Powers Jr. - mastering at PM Mastering inc., New Jersey

== Charts ==
Chart (2021)	Peak position
UK Album Downloads (OCC)	17
UK R&B Albums (OCC)	3
US Independent Albums (Billboard)	49
US Top Album Sales (Billboard)	17
