= In the Middle (Alexander O'Neal song) =

Single by Alexander O'Neal

from the album Love Makes No Sense
- Released: 1993
- Recorded: 1992
- Studio: Winsonics (Los Angeles)
- Genre: R&B; hip hop
- Length: 4:37 (album version)
- Label: Tabu
- Songwriter(s): Terry Coffey; Jon Nettlesbey
- Producer(s): Terry Coffey; Jon Nettlesbey; Pete Rock (remix)

Alexander O'Neal singles chronology
"Love Makes No Sense" (1993)	"In the Middle" (1993)	"Aphrodisia" (1993)

Music video
- "In the Middle" on YouTube

"In the Middle" is a song written and produced by Terry Coffey and Jon Nettlesbey, and recorded by American recording artist Alexander O'Neal. It was released in 1993 by Tabu Records as the second single from his fifth studio album, Love Makes No Sense (1993). The song's distinctive backing vocals were performed by Cherrelle. Following the successful chart performances of the single "Love Makes No Sense", "In the Middle" was recorded by Wolfgang Aichholz at Winsonics, Los Angeles, CA. It became O'Neal's 24th hit single, reaching number 32 on the UK Singles Chart and number 26 on the US Billboard Hot R&B/Hip-Hop Singles & Tracks chart. The accompanying music video was directed by Zack Snyder. The single's front cover bears resemblance to a bingo board.

== Track listing ==
- 7" single (587 714-7)
1. "In the Middle (Radio Mix)"
2. "In the Middle (Brown Mix)"
- 12" single (587 715-1)
1. "In the Middle (Brown Mix)"
2. "In the Middle (The Qat Concept Mix)"
3. "In the Middle (The Glam Slam Mix)"
4. "In the Middle (Brown Surround Mix)"
5. "In the Middle (Rapless Mix)"
- CD single (587 715-2)
1. "In the Middle (Radio Mix)" – 3:43
2. "In the Middle (Brown Mix)" – 4:34
3. "In the Middle (Rapless Mix)" – 4:32
4. "In the Middle (Brown Surround Mix)" – 4:32
5. "In the Middle (The Qat Concept Mix)" – 12:01
6. "In the Middle (The Glam Slam Mix)" – 8:12
- Cassette single (31458 7710 4)
1. "In the Middle (Radio Mix)"
2. "In the Middle (Instrumental Version)"

== Personnel ==
Credits are adapted from the album's liner notes.

- Alexander O'Neal – lead vocals
- Terry Coffey – synthesizer programming, keyboards, vocal arrangements
- Jon Nettlesbey – drum programming, percussion, vocal arrangements
- Cherrelle – backing vocals
- Sean Devereaux – backing vocals

== Charts ==
Chart (1993)	Peak position
Europe (Eurochart Hot 100)	100
Europe (European Dance Radio)	18
UK Singles (OCC)	32
UK Airplay (Music Week)	16
US Hot R&B Singles (Billboard)	26
