= Get It While It's Hot =

Single by Nodesha

from the album Nodesha
- Released: October 28, 2003
- Label: Flytime; Arista
- Songwriters: James Harris III; Terry Lewis; Alex Richbourg; Bernard Edwards; Nile Rodgers; Tony Tolbert
- Producer: Jimmy Jam & Terry Lewis

Nodesha singles chronology
"Get It While It's Hot" (2003)	"That's Crazy" (2003)

"Get It While It's Hot" is a song by American singer Nodesha, from her self-titled debut studio album (2003). It was released on October 28, 2003 through Flytime Music and Arista Records.

== Background and composition ==
"Get It While It's Hot" was written and produced by both Jimmy Jam and Terry Lewis for Nodesha's self-titled debut studio album. It derives from the musical genre of R&B, and samples the song "I Want Your Love" by the American band Chic. Eamonn McCusker of The Digital Fix called it a "stomping partner" to "Bootylicious" by American girl group Destiny's Child. The song contains "breathless" vocals from Nodesha which are against a backing track that has R&B and disco genres.

== Critical response ==
"Get It While It's Hot" received positive reviews from music critics. An editor at Billboard characterized the track as a "cool, sleek midnight party jam," further noting that it “offers the best sexy groove-and-sway since "Rock Your Body" by Justin Timberlake." The editor also praised Nodesha's talent, asserting that she had "a hit on her hands." Additionally, the review observed that the production bore the distinctive imprint of Jam & Lewis, whose signature style was described as sufficiently reminiscent of Janet Jackson to lend the song an appealing sense of built-in familiarity. Eamonn McCusker of The Digital Fix felt that "Get It While It's Hot" "really opens the album," and went on to declare the track as "clearly being the album's best moment."

== Commercial performance ==
"Get It While It's Hot" debuted and peaked at number 45 on the Australian Singles Chart. In Belgium, the song peaked at number 26 on both the Flanders and Wallonia singles charts. The song reached the top twenty on the singles chart in the Netherlands, where it peaked at number 18. "Get It While It's Hot" peaked at number 96 in Germany. It also debuted and peaked at number 55 on the UK Singles Chart for the issue dated November 1, 2003.

== Charts ==
Chart (2003)	Peak position
Australia (ARIA)	45
Belgium (Ultratop 50 Flanders)	26
Belgium (Ultratop 50 Wallonia)	26
Germany (GfK)	96
Netherlands (Dutch Top 40)	20
UK Singles (OCC)	55
UK Hip Hop/R&B (OCC)	15
