= High Hopes (The S.O.S. Band song) =

Single by The S.O.S. Band

from the album III
- B-side: "Good & Plenty"
- Released: 1982
- Recorded: 1981
- Genre: Post-disco; boogie; funk
- Length: 6:30
- Label: Tabu
- Songwriters: James Harris III; Terry Lewis
- Producers: Ricky Sylvers; Gene Dozier

The S.O.S. Band singles chronology
"You" (1981)	"High Hopes" (1982)	"Have It My Way" (1983)

"High Hopes" is the sixth charting single for the S.O.S. Band. It reached number 25 on the R&B chart in 1982. It marked the first collaboration of writers Jimmy Jam and Terry Lewis with the group. They wrote many more hits for the group during the 1980s.

It was sampled by French beat-maker Onra on his song of the same title, "High Hopes ft. Reggie B" on his 2010 album Long Distance.

== Chart positions ==
Chart (1982)	Peak position
U.S. Billboard Hot Black Singles	25
U.S. Billboard Hot Dance Club Play	49

== See also ==
- List of songs written by Jimmy Jam and Terry Lewis
