= Tell Me If You Still Care =

- 12-inch variant of UK picture sleeve

Single by The S.O.S. Band

from the album On the Rise
- B-side: "If You Want My Love"
- Released: 1983
- Recorded: 1982
- Genre: R&B; slow jam
- Length: 6:58 (album version); 4:59 (single edit)
- Label: Tabu
- Songwriters: James Harris III; Terry Lewis
- Producer: Jimmy Jam and Terry Lewis

The S.O.S. Band singles chronology
"Just Be Good to Me" (1983)	"Tell Me If You Still Care" (1983)	"For Your Love" (1983)

"Tell Me If You Still Care" is a song by the S.O.S. Band. It is the opening track on the group's fourth studio album On the Rise and was issued as the album's second single. Written and produced by Jimmy Jam and Terry Lewis, the song peaked at #5 on the Billboard Hot Soul Songs chart in 1983.

The song was released on various formats (album, 7-inch single and compact disc) in different versions and a 7-inch single remix/edit.

== Chart positions ==
Chart (1983)	Peak position
UK Singles (The Official Charts Company)	81
US Billboard Hot 100	65
US Hot R&B/Hip-Hop Singles & Tracks (Billboard)	5

== Covers and samples ==
"Tell Me If You Still Care" was covered by:

- Monica in 1995 for her debut album Miss Thang
- Mariah Carey's "Mr. Dupri Mix" of "Always Be My Baby" sampled the song, which also features rapper Da Brat and R&B group Xscape
- It was also interpolated in the chorus of Scarface's 1997 hit "Smile", as well as the 2011 song "Smile" by gospel artist Kirk Franklin
- Also, the song was interpolated by DJ Jazzy Jeff & the Fresh Prince in their song "I'm Looking for the One (To Be with Me)"
- LL Cool J in "Hip-Hop" feat. Terri & Monica
- Janet Jackson in "Call on Me"
- Jodeci's 2015 song "Incredible" for their album The Past, the Present, the Future
- It was sampled by rapper Prince Markie Dee for his song "All My Love, All the Time", which features R&B singer Joe
- It was covered by reggae group T.O.K in 2005
