= Diamonds in the Raw =

Diamond in the Raw

Studio album by The S.O.S. Band
- Released: 1989
- Genre: R&B; boogie; soul
- Label: Tabu; Epic
- Producer: Curtis Williams; Eban Kelly; Jimi Rudolph; Jason Bryant; Sigidi

The S.O.S. Band chronology
Sands of Time (1986)	Diamond in the Raw (1989)	One of Many Nights (1991)

Professional ratings
Review scores
Source	Rating
AllMusic	3/5 stars
Chicago Tribune	3/4 stars

Diamonds in the Raw is the seventh studio album by the S.O.S. Band, released by Tabu Records in 1989. The album marked the absence of lead singer Mary Davis, who left in 1987 to pursue a solo career. Chandra Currelley became the lead singer. Tragedy struck the band due to the untimely death of saxophonist Billy Ellis shortly before the album's completion.

== Track listing ==
#	Title	Writer(s)	Length
1.	I'm Still Missing Your Love	Curtis F. Williams/K. Lynette Patterson	4:30
2.	Goldmine	Curtis F. Williams/T. Haynes	5:49
3.	Do You Love Me?	Curtis F. Williams/D. Thomas	5:11
4.	Men Don't Cry	Eban Kelly/Jimi Randolph	6:01
5.	One Lover	Curtis F. Williams/K. Lynette Patterson	4:31
6.	Secret Wish	J. Fluitsma/E.V. TIjn/R. Baars	6:15
7.	Hold Out	Jason Bryant/S. Johnson	5:22
8.	Get Out of My Life	Jason Bryant/Abdul Ra'oof	4:16
9.	Crossfire (Parts I and II)	Eban Kelly/Jimi Randolph	7:22

== Personnel ==
=== S.O.S. Band ===
- Marcus Williams – drums, percussion
- Jason Bryant – keyboards, vocals
- Chandra Currelley – lead and background vocals
- Fredi Grace – lead and background vocals
- Bruno Speight – lead guitar
- Abdul Raoof – trumpet, lead vocals, backing vocals
- Kurt Mitchell – bass

=== Additional personnel ===
- George Howard – Soprano Saxophone
- Curtis Williams – Eban Kelly: Backing Vocals
