= Brainstorm (American band) =

American funk and R&B band

Brainstorm was an American funk and R&B band active in the late 1970s, based in Detroit, Michigan. Their debut album, Stormin' , was their best-selling album, and was released in 1977 on Tabu Records, executive-produced by Clarence Avant and produced by Jerry Peters. It contained the disco hit single "Lovin' Is Really My Game", which was featured in the film 54 starring Mike Myers, and won the 1978 Billboard magazine Light Radio/Heavy Disco Record of the Year. The album also contained the radio hit "This Must Be Heaven" which is considered a soul classic, by virtue of its continued air play 34 years later. Other single releases from subsequent albums included 1978's "On Our Way Home", and "Hot for You", featuring Belita Woods on lead vocals.

Chuck Overton started the band. The members of the band (on the Stormin' album) were Belita Woods, bandleader and saxophonist Charles Overton, Lamont Johnson on fretless bass and vocals ("This Must Be Heaven"), Renell Gonsalves on drums, Treaty Womack on vocals, percussion, and flute, Bob Ross (a.k.a. Professor RJ Ross) on keyboards, Gerald "Jerry" Kent on guitar, Jeryl Bright on trombone, and "Leaping" Larry Sims on trumpet. Future Wham!/George Michael bassist, Deon Estus, was also a member of the band for a time. A teenage Regina Carter, who later became internationally known and respected as a jazz violinist, joined the band around 1978 and performed for a time with them. TheBrothersAli.com Jerome Ali (guitar) @JeromeAliGuitarTwin and @Jimmy Ali (bass), joined about the same time in 1978, Then joined Parlet George Clinton’s sister group of Parliament/ Funkadelic touring the U.S and Europe. These days performing in Las Vegas, Houston & Detroit.

Members of Brainstorm continued their musical careers with other bands or in production. Woods later went on to perform as part of the Parliament-Funkadelic collective in touring sets around the world. Sims became the trumpeter for the Sounds of Blackness, which won two Grammy Awards during the 1990s. Bright went on to play trombone with the funk band Cameo for over twenty five years, and later released an album with other former Cameo members Aaron Mills, and Thomas TC Campbell, known as MCB (which was also the title of their album). Trenita "Treaty" Womack performs regularly with the Funk Brothers as well as a wide variety of other artists, and appeared in Standing in the Shadows of Motown, an award-winning documentary, as percussionist. Gerald "Jerry" Kent has produced a BMI-affiliated self-published CD in 2006, under the name Kent's Way Overdue entitled Tone Paintings, an original jazz-fusion guitar-based collection of instrumental cuts. He also plays guitar and bass with the IDMR Detroit Choir, which choir was used in the closing scenes of Standing in the Shadows of Motown, singing background harmony behind Chaka Khan in a Grammy 2003 winning performance of "What's Going On". William Wooten, who joined the band after the first album playing keyboards, now tours with The Dramatics and The Spinners. Lamont Johnson released several solo albums and teaches bass. Renell Gonsalves performs with a wide variety of artists, as a skillful Latin-jazz percussionist (His father was renowned jazz saxophonist Paul Gonsalves, late of the Duke Ellington band). Professor RJ Ross has written and co-produced a number of music projects with well-known artists in California including a 2008 CD Face to Face.

Singer Belita Karen Woods died on May 14, 2012, at age 63.

== Discography ==
=== Albums ===
- 1977: Stormin'
- 1978: Journey to the Light
- 1979: Funky Entertainment
