= Love Makes No Sense (song) =

Single by Alexander O'Neal

from the album Love Makes No Sense
- Released: 1993
- Recorded: 1992
- Genre: R&B; new jack swing
- Length: 6:58 (album version)
- Label: Tabu; A&M
- Songwriter(s): Tony Tolbert; Lance Alexander
- Producer(s): Lance Alexander; prof. t

Alexander O'Neal singles chronology
"Sentimental" (1992)	"Love Makes No Sense" (1993)	"In the Middle" (1993)

"Love Makes No Sense" is a song written by Tony Tolbert and Lance Alexander, and recorded by American recording artist Alexander O'Neal. It was released in 1993 by Tabu and A&M as the first single from O'Neal's fifth solo album, Love Makes No Sense (1993). The single was recorded by Lance Alexander and prof. t at Flyte Tyme Studios, Edina, MN, with additional recording by Anthony "AJ" Jeffries, Steve Van Arden, and Jay Lean at Summa Music Group, Los Angeles, CA, and Westlake Audio, Hollywood, CA. It became O'Neal's 23rd hit single, reaching number 26 on the UK Singles Chart and number 13 on the US Billboard Hot R&B/Hip-Hop Singles & Tracks chart.

== Track listing ==
- 7" single (AM 7708, 587 708-7)
1. "Love Makes No Sense (7" Radio Mix)" - 4:00
2. "Love Makes No Sense (Brothers In Rhythm Remix Edit)" - 7:38
- 12" single (31458 7707 1)
1. "Love Makes No Sense (LP Version)" - 6:59
2. "Love Makes No Sense (Bonus Beat Mix)" - 6:57
- CD single (587 709-2)
1. "Love Makes No Sense (7" Radio Mix)" - 4:03
2. "Love Makes No Sense (Album Version)" - 7:00
3. "Love Makes No Sense (Brothers In Rhythm Remix)" - 7:37
4. "Love Makes No Sense (Brothers In Rhythm Dub)" - 6:20
5. "Love Makes No Sense (Bonus Beat Mix)" - 6:58
6. "Love Makes No Sense (Instrumental)" - 6:57
- Cassette single (31458 7706 4)
1. "Love Makes No Sense (Radio Edit)" - 4:24
2. "Love Makes No Sense (LP Version)" - 6:59

== Personnel ==
Credits are adapted from the album's liner notes.

- Alexander O'Neal - lead vocals
- Lance Alexander - keyboards, piano, synthesizer, drum programming, percussion, rhythm arrangement
- Kevin Pierce - guitar
- Franklin Wharton - flute
- prof. t - vocal arrangement, additional vocals, backing vocals
- Joey Elias - backing vocals
- Carrie Harrington - backing vocals

== Charts ==
=== Weekly charts ===
Chart (1993)	Peak position
Europe (Eurochart Hot 100)	89
Europe (European Dance Radio)	4
UK Singles (OCC)	26
UK Airplay (Music Week)	17
UK Club Chart (Music Week)	2
US Bubbling Under Hot 100 (Billboard)	8
US Hot R&B Singles (Billboard)	13
US Hot Dance/Club Play (Billboard)	45

=== Year-end charts ===
Chart (1993)	Position
UK Club Chart (Music Week)	63
