= Sands of Time (S.O.S. Band album) =

Studio album by The S.O.S. Band
- Released: April 9, 1986
- Recorded: Flyte Tyme Productions, Inc. (Minneapolis, Minnesota); Crawford Post Productions (Atlanta, Georgia)
- Genre: R&B; soul
- Length: 39:15
- Label: Tabu
- Producer: Jimmy Jam; Terry Lewis; The S.O.S. Band

The S.O.S. Band chronology
Just the Way You Like It (1984)	Sands of Time (1986)	Diamonds in the Raw (1989)

Singles from Sands of Time
- 1. "The Finest"; 2. "Borrowed Love"; 3. "Even When You Sleep"; 4. "No Lies"

Professional ratings
Review scores
Source	Rating
AllMusic	3/5 stars
Robert Christgau	B
Los Angeles Times	(favourable)
Musician	(favourable)
People	(favourable)

Sands of Time is the sixth studio album by the R&B band the S.O.S. Band, released on the Tabu label in April 1986. It was produced by Jimmy Jam and Terry Lewis. This would be the last album to feature original lead singer Mary Davis before she left the group to embark on a solo career.

== History ==
Sands of Time peaked at No. 4 on the R&B albums chart. It also reached No. 44 on the Pop albums chart. The lead single, "The Finest", reached the Billboard R&B Top Ten, peaking at No. 2. The single also peaked at No. 44 on the Billboard Hot 100, No. 8 on the Hot Dance Club Play chart and No. 17 on the UK Singles Chart. Three follow-up singles, "Borrowed Love", "Even When You Sleep", and "No Lies" also reached the R&B chart, peaking at No. 14, No. 34, and No. 43, respectively. "No Lies" peaked at No. 2 on the Hot Dance Club Play chart.

== Track listing ==
All tracks are written by Terry Lewis and James Harris III, except where noted.

Side one
No.	Title	Length
1.	"Even When You Sleep"	4:08
2.	"Sands of Time"	4:28
3.	"Borrowed Love"	5:26
4.	"Nothing But the Best"	4:48

Side two
No.	Title	Length
5.	"The Finest"	6:09
6.	"No Lies"	4:58
7.	"Two Time Lover" (Jerome Thomas, Lloyd Oby, Jason Bryant, Jr.)	4:30
8.	"Do You Still Want To?" (Reather Bryant, Jerome Thomas, Jason Bryant, Jr.)	4:57
9.	"Sands of Time (Reprise)"	0:28

== Personnel ==
- Jason Bryant – keyboards, lead vocals
- Mary Davis – lead and background vocals
- Billy Ellis – saxophone
- Sonny Killebrew – saxophone
- Abdul Ra'oof – trumpet, lead vocals
- John Simpson – bass
- Bruno Speight – guitar
- Jerome Thomas – drums, percussion
- Kurt Mitchell – bass

Additional personnel

- Jimmy Jam, Terry Lewis, Jellybean Johnson, Stewart Hanley, Kurt Mitchel – musicians
- Mark Smith – background vocals
- Cherrelle, Alexander O'Neal – special guest vocalists (on "The Finest")
- Terry Lewis, Lisa Keith, Jellybean Johnson, Jimmy Jam, Jerome Benton, Fredi Grace, Lloyd Oby – vocalists

== Production ==
- Jimmy Jam and Terry Lewis – producers, executive producers, recording engineers, assistant engineers
- The S.O.S. Band – producers (on "Two Time Lover" and "Do You Still Want To?")
- Tom Race – recording engineer
- Steve Hodge – assistant engineer, mixing engineer
- Brian Gardner – mastering engineer
- Robin Tucker – A&R coordinator
- Dale Wehlacz – art direction, design, illustration

== Charts ==
=== Weekly charts ===
Chart (1986)	Peak position
Dutch Albums (Album Top 100)	38
German Albums (Offizielle Top 100)	20
New Zealand Albums (RMNZ)	36
Swedish Albums (Sverigetopplistan)	35
UK Albums (OCC)	15
US Billboard 200	44
US Top R&B/Hip-Hop Albums (Billboard)	4

=== Year-end charts ===
Chart (1986)	Position
US Top R&B/Hip-Hop Albums (Billboard)	26

=== Singles ===
Year	Single	Peak chart positions			
Year	Single	US	US R&B	US Dan	UK
1986	"The Finest"	44	2	8	17
1986	"Borrowed Love"	—	14	26	50
1986	"Even When You Sleep"	—	34	—	—
1986	"No Lies"	—	43	2	64
