= Tiana Xiao =

Chinese American singer-songwriter (born 1990)

- Also known as: 蕭鳴兒 (Traditional) 萧鸣儿 (Simplified); Pinyin: Xiāo Míng Er; Katakana: ティアナ・シャオ
- Origin: Los Angeles, California, US; Cornell University
- Genres: R&B, hip hop, J-pop, pop
- Occupations: Singer, songwriter
- Instruments: Vocals, violin
- Years active: 2008–present
- Labels: Imperial Records (Teichiku Entertainment, Inc.)
- Website: Tiana Xiao Official Website Tiana Xiao Imperial Records Official Website

Tiana Xiao is a Chinese-American singer-songwriter. Xiao initially debuted in 2008, mainly performing J-pop and R&B, and later diversified her repertoire to pursue pop music more broadly, including C-pop.

== Biography ==
Tiana Xiao was born in Sichuan, China and moved to the United States with her family when she was two years old. Her family currently resides in Los Angeles, California.

At the age of fourteen, Xiao studied singing with several private vocal coaches and attended classes at the Millennium Dance Complex in North Hollywood to improve her vocals and other performance skills, including stage presence and dance.

In January 2006, Xiao began attending HIPAC, a vocal school located in Los Angeles. Her voice teacher saw tremendous potential in the then 15-year-old Xiao and trained her for about three months before sending a demo CD to a management/production company in Japan.

A few months later, during the summer of 2006, Xiao was brought by her vocal coach to Tokyo for an audition. Her unique voice earned her a recording contract with her label, Imperial Records, a division of Teichiku Entertainment, Inc.

In 2009, Xiao ended her contract with Imperial Records, and took a hiatus from singing to finish college. She graduated from Cornell University in 2012.

Upon graduation, Xiao moved to Asia and continued to release music, including cover songs.

== Career ==
Tiana's debut single CD, Sweet Obsession, was released on January 23, 2008. The music was written and produced by Jeeve. The original lyrics of Sweet Obsession, written in English, were penned by Tiana herself. Tiana also wrote the English portion of the lyrics in the B-side, Temptation. Days after Tiana's debut, a controversial news article surfaced in several popular Japanese websites, including a widely used SNS (social networking service) website known as mixi, raising the question of whether or not Tiana Xiao has a shot at becoming the next Hikaru Utada, due to a similarity in upbringing, educational background, musical style, and specific vocal habits. Tiana has also cited Utada as one of her major musical influences since childhood. However, she does not hope to follow in the footsteps of any artist, but would rather create a distinct image as herself in the music industry. The news article quickly raised awareness of "Tiana Xiao" among the Japanese audience. However, to date, Sweet Obsession has not generated a significant number of sales.

A second single, titled KIZUNA, was released on April 23, 2008. The two songs on the CD are written and produced by Tom Keane, who wrote and produced music for many well-known artists such as Celine Dion and Chaka Khan, and his associate Roycel Cooks. And again, the lyrics of both KIZUNA and the coupling number (B-side) were co-written by Tiana.

Tiana's first studio album was released in May. The songs featured in the album will include all tracks from her two previous maxi singles, as well as the highly anticipated songs written and produced by other notable producers from both the United States and the United Kingdom, including Alexis Smith (UK) Tom Keane, Jeeve and Jimmy Jam & Terry Lewis (Jam & Lewis) (U.S.).

After an eleven-month hiatus, Tiana releases a third single, Kanashii Uso. Despite receiving a substantial amount of positive critical reviews, the single did not make the Oricon charts due to a lack of sufficient promotion from Tiana's label. In contrast to her previous singles, Kanashii Uso featured three songs. Tiana continues her R&B style with a mid-tempo A side. Both the music video and the song itself were highly lauded by fans and non-supporters alike, saying it is Tiana's best A side and music video to date. The second song on the single, Promise, is a classic J-pop ballad, and the third song, You're My Heart, is a power ballad that significantly shows off Tiana's vocal range and abilities.

On December 1, 2009, Tiana has announced an official return to school, stating that she will continue her career in music after graduation.

== Discography ==
=== Singles ===
Year	Title	Label	Notes
2008	Sweet Obsession	Imperial Records	Japanese; Release date: January 23, 2008
2008	KIZUNA	Imperial Records	Japanese; Release date: April 23, 2008
2009	Kanashii Uso	Imperial Records	Japanese; Release date: May 20, 2009

=== Albums ===
Year	Title	Label	Notes
2008	Destiny	Imperial Records	Japanese; First studio album; Release date: May 21, 2008
