= I'm Here for You =

Studio album by Ann Nesby
- Released: 1996
- Genre: R&B
- Length: 1:11:02
- Label: Perspective
- Producer: Jimmy Jam and Terry Lewis

Ann Nesby chronology
I'm Here for You (1996)	Love Is What We Need: The Essentials (2001)

I'm Here for You is the debut album by the American singer Ann Nesby, released in 1996. Nesby supported the album by performing at the opening ceremonies of the 1996 Summer Olympics, in Atlanta.

The album peaked at No. 157 on the Billboard 200.

== Production ==
The album was produced in part by Jimmy Jam and Terry Lewis. Nesby cowrote or wrote every song on I'm Here for You. Gerald Albright contributed saxophone to the album. "Lord How I Need You" was written in Nesby's hometown of Rockford, Illinois, and was produced by Rockford native Big Jim Wright.

== Critical reception ==
Professional ratings
Review scores
Source	Rating
AllMusic	4/5 stars
The Encyclopedia of Popular Music	3/5 stars
MusicHound R&B: The Essential Album Guide	3/5 stars
Muzik	4.5/5 stars

The Los Angeles Sentinel praised the "earthy singing," calling the album "the sound of love, passion and blackness." The Star Tribune wrote that Nesby's "majestic voice shines on a spiritual collection of R&B."

The Christian Science Monitor deemed the album "a smooth mix of traditional gospel, dance tunes, and ballads... The traditional gospel tune 'Lord How I Need You' showcases Nesby's origins in the church choir." The St. Paul Pioneer Press wrote that, "while the strings, vibes and other background instruments too often sound slightly, frightfully, canned, Nesby's voice rises above it all to deliver a truly spectacular performance throughout." Jesse Ballinger, of Miami New Times, opined that, "on 'Let the Rain Fall', Nesby makes the strongest argument I've heard yet for hip-hop/gospel fusion."

AllMusic deemed it "a brilliant blend of gospel, R&B, dance and ballads." MusicHound R&B: The Essential Album Guide considered the album to be "one of the most complete and pleasurable packages ever put together by Jam and Lewis."

== Track listing ==
No.	Title	Length
1.	"Let the Rain Fall"	4:32
2.	"I'm Still Wearing Your Name"	5:03
3.	"If You Love Me"	5:31
4.	"The Invitation"	:28
5.	"(What a) Lovely Evening"	6:01
6.	"I'll Do Anything for You"	5:51
7.	"String Interlude"	:39
8.	"Thrill Me"	4:32
9.	"Hold On"	5:11
10.	"In the Spirit"	5:28
11.	"This Weekend"	4:22
12.	"Can I Get a Witness?"	4:02
13.	"I'm Here for You"	5:28
14.	"I'll Be Your Everything"	4:51
15.	"Let Old Memories Be"	4:27
16.	"Lord How I Need You"	4:36
Total length:		1:11:02 or 71:02
