= Professor RJ Ross =

- Born: Detroit, Michigan, U.S.
- Genres: Jazz; Smooth Jazz; Classic R&B
- Instruments: Vocals, piano, electric piano
- Years active: 1977–present
- Label: Music Force Media Group
- Formerly of: Brainstorm
- Website: www.professorrjross.com

Professor RJ Ross is a smooth jazz and classic R&B singer and pianist. His debut solo album Face To Face was released by Music Force Media Group in 2008.

== Early career ==
Ross's career began as a founding member of Detroit funk band Brainstorm. The band's album Stormin' was released by famed music executive Clarence Avant's Tabu Records.

Ross then moved to Oakland, California where he spent several years as the in-house arranger, producer, keyboardist and midi-expert at Fantasy Studios. At Fantasy, he played on numerous records, including those by Eddie Money, Jeffrey Osborne, Huey Lewis, MC Hammer and Tupac Shakur.

== Cancer ==
In 1999, Ross was diagnosed with a rare form of Stage-IV cancer. According to Ross, the doctor told him that the cancer was inoperable and incurable. He then began a 5-year battle that eventually led to "an extremely risky and invasive" surgery that successfully left him cancer free.

== Face To Face ==
After recovering from cancer surgery, Ross began writing the songs that would make up Face To Face. He enlisted the services of producer Jerry Stucker and began recording at Capitol Studios in Hollywood. Ross put together an all-star cast of musicians to play on the album including drummers James Gadson and Steve Gadd, bassist Freddie Washington, Hammond B3 organist Neil Larsen, tenor and soprano sax player Ernie Watts, and vocalists Sandy Griffith and Jeannie Tracy. Grammy-award winner Ed Cherney mixed the album at The Village in Los Angeles.

== Discography ==
=== Albums ===
- Professor RJ Ross and the University of Soul (late 2007, self-released)
- Face To Face (October 21, 2008; Music Force Media Group)
- On This Silent Night (November 16, 2010; 2010 Lantana Records)

=== Guest appearances ===
- "I Don't Want to Miss a Thing" – Sally Kellerman featuring Professor RJ Ross (Sally, February 10, 2009)
