= On the Rise =

Studio album by The S.O.S. Band
- Released: July 1, 1983
- Recorded: 1982–1983; Master Sound Studio (Atlanta, Georgia); Larrabee Sound (Los Angeles, California); Sound Masters (Los Angeles, California)
- Genre: Funk; electro; boogie; urban; soul
- Length: 42:24
- Label: Tabu
- Producer: Jimmy Jam; Terry Lewis; Gene Dozier; The S.O.S. Band

The S.O.S. Band chronology
III (1982)	On the Rise (1983)	Just the Way You Like It (1984)

Singles from On the Rise
- 1. "Just Be Good to Me" Released: 1983; 2. "Tell Me If You Still Care" Released: 1983; 3. "For Your Love" Released: 1984

Professional ratings
Review scores
Source	Rating
AllMusic	4/5 stars
The Boston Globe	(favourable)
Record Collector	4/5 stars

On the Rise is the fourth album by the R&B band the S.O.S. Band, released by Tabu Records on July 1, 1983.

== Critical reception ==
Marcia Smith of the Boston Globe claimed, "Smooth production, dynamic vocals and strong dance rhythms characterize this album...All in all, good danceable rhythm blues."

Amy Hanson of Allmusic with praise wrote, "Hip, slick, and full of dance tricks, the band infused On the Rise with enough '80s synth sounds to break through in the clubs, while keeping their funk roots intact. Energized throughout, the set hardly slows down for a moment...On the Rise is the sound of a band finding their feet again -- and knowing what to do with them once they'd found them."

== History ==
The album peaked at No. 7 on the R&B albums chart. It also reached #47 on the Billboard 200. The album yielded two Billboard R&B Top Ten singles, "Just Be Good to Me" and "Tell Me If You Still Care", each peaking at No. 2 and No. 5. Both singles also charted on the Billboard Hot 100, reaching No. 55 and No. 65. "Just Be Good to Me" also peaked at No. 3 on the Hot Dance Club Play chart and No. 13 on the UK Singles Chart. The third single, "For Your Love", also charted on the R&B chart, reaching No. 34. The album also includes a cover of Johnnie Taylor's 1968 hit song, "Who's Making Love".

On the Rise was produced by Gene Dozier, Jimmy Jam and Terry Lewis.The album was digitally remastered and reissued on CD with bonus tracks in 2013 by Demon Music Group.

== Track listing ==
All tracks are written by Terry Lewis and James Harris III, except where noted.

Side one
No.	Title	Length
1.	"Tell Me If You Still Care"	6:58
2.	"Just Be Good to Me"	9:03
3.	"For Your Love"	6:09

Side two
No.	Title	Writer(s)	Length
4.	"I'm Not Runnin'"	Travis Biggs, Mary Davis, Connie Scotto	4:37
5.	"If You Want My Love"	Jerome Thomas, John A. Simpson III	4:20
6.	"On the Rise"	John A. Simpson III	3:30
7.	"Who's Making Love"	Homer Banks, Don Davis, Raymond Jackson, Bettye Crutcher	4:16
8.	"Steppin' the Stones"	Gene Dozier, Crystal McCarey	3:23

2013 remastered bonus tracks
No.	Title	Writer(s)	Length
9.	"For Your Love" (Extended Version)		9:29
10.	"If You Want My Love" (Extended Version)	Jerome Thomas, John A. Simpson III	4:57
11.	"Just Be Good to Me" (Special Version)		8:50
12.	"Just Be Good to Me" (Vocal Remix)		7:41

== Personnel ==
The S.O.S. Band

- Jason Bryant – keyboards, vocals
- Mary Davis – lead vocals
- Billy Ellis – saxophone
- Willie "Sonny" Killebrew – saxophone, flute
- Abdul Ra'oof – trumpet, flugelhorn, percussion, lead vocals
- John A. Simpson III – bass
- Bruno Speight – guitar
- Jerome "J.T." Thomas – drums, percussion

== Production ==
- Jimmy Jam and Terry Lewis, Gene Dozier, The S.O.S. Band – producers, arrangers
- Clarence Avant – executive producer
- Tina Stephans – A&R coordinator
- Ron Cristopher, Bob Brown, Sabrina Buchanek, Judy Clapp, Taavi Mote – engineers
- Steve Hodge – engineer, mixing engineer
- Brian Gardner – mastering
- Bunnie Jackson Ransom – management
- Ezra Tucker – cover illustration
- Ford Smith – back cover photo

== Charts ==
Chart (1983)	Peak
U.S. Billboard Top LPs & Tape	47
U.S. Billboard Top Black Albums	7

Singles

Year	Single	Peak chart positions			
Year	Single	US	US R&B	US Dan	UK
1983	"Just Be Good to Me"	55	2	3	13
1983	"Tell Me If You Still Care"	65	5	—	81
1984	"For Your Love"	—	34	26	—
