= Somewhat Loved =

2021 single by Jam & Lewis featuring Mariah Carey

"Somewhat Loved (There You Go Breakin' My Heart)"

Single by Jam & Lewis featuring Mariah Carey

from the album Jam & Lewis: Volume One
- Released: June 10, 2021
- Recorded: 2021
- Length: 3:53
- Label: Flyte Tyme; BMG
- Songwriters: James Harris III; Terry Lewis; Mariah Carey; Terius Nash
- Producers: James Harris III; Terry Lewis

Jam & Lewis singles chronology
"He Don't Know Nothin' Bout It" (2020)	"Somewhat Loved (There You Go Breakin' My Heart)" (2021)

Mariah Carey singles chronology
"Where I Belong" (2021)	"Somewhat Loved (There You Go Breakin' My Heart)" (2021)	"Fall in Love at Christmas" (2021)

"Somewhat Loved (There You Go Breakin' My Heart)" is a song by American production duo Jimmy Jam and Terry Lewis featuring American singer-songwriter Mariah Carey, for the duo's debut studio album Jam & Lewis: Volume One (2021). It was released as the album's third single on June 10, 2021. The song peaked at number nine on the US Adult R&B Songs chart, and number 30 on the US R&B/Hip-Hop Airplay chart.

== Background ==
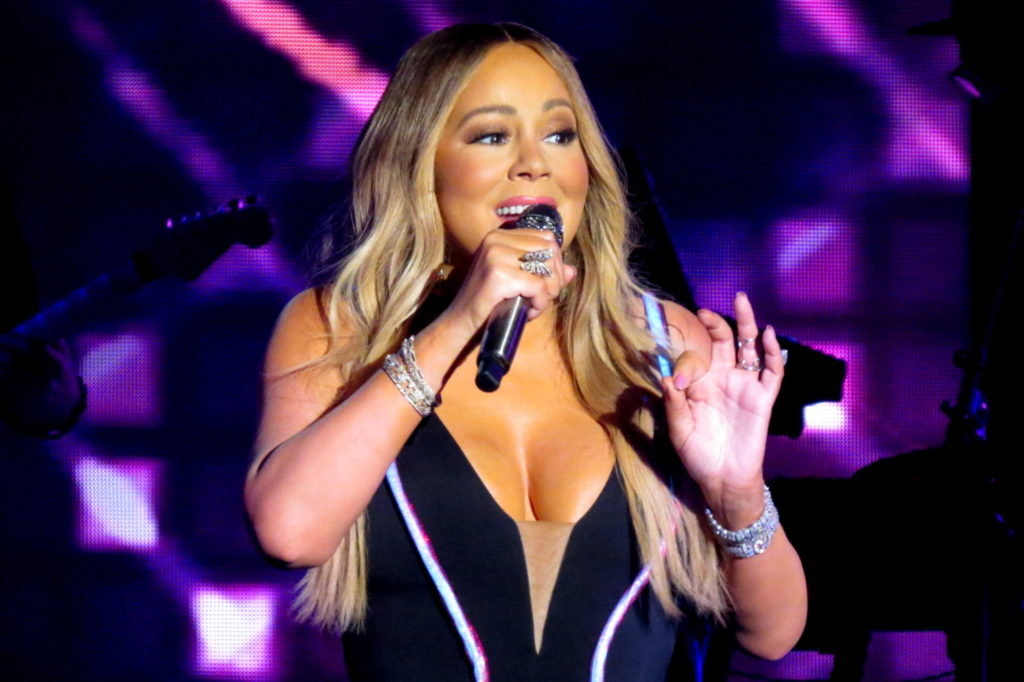
Mariah Carey (pictured) received praise for her vocals on the song; the song marked Carey's 15th top-ten hit on the US Billboard Adult R&B Songs chart.

Jimmy Jam and Terry Lewis first began working with Mariah Carey in 1999 on her seventh studio album Rainbow, which spawned the US number-one single "Thank God I Found You", a song written and produced by the trio (becoming Carey's 15th number-one song and Jam and Lewis' 13th as a producer). They also produced "Can't Take That Away (Mariah's Theme)" from the same album, which reached the top-ten on the US Hot Dance Club Songs chart. This was followed by their collaborations on Carey's following albums Glitter (2001) and Charmbracelet (2002) on songs such as "Through the Rain" and "Yours".

Two decades later in April 2019, Jam and Lewis announced their debut studio album as recording artists, which tapped an array of R&B hitmakers who they've penned hits for over the years for the record including Mary J. Blige, Toni Braxton and Carey. Carey stated that,

"Working with [Jam and Lewis] through the years has been one of the greatest creative journeys I have ever taken. It's a great honor for me to participate in this once-in-a-lifetime album".

== Composition ==
Jam stated, "With Mariah, we sent her something we thought would be cool for her. She liked it, but also had an idea that she wanted to sing for us – an a capella with a piano part. Great! It was an idea that she had for a song from before she had kids. We put it together with intricate arrangements, and of course, a beat. Two days later she sent something back, we mixed it, and it became ["Somewhat Loved"]. According to Carey, she wrote the song when her twins were babies at the time. In a press statement, Jimmy Jam and Terry Lewis noted that,

"When we started Jam & Lewis: Volume 1, we put a wishlist together of all our favorite artists. The chance to reunite with our friend and fellow Songwriters Hall of Fame partner Mariah was wishlist fulfillment at its finest."

Billboard noted that the song featured "endless layers of overlapping vocals from Carey as well as some of her signature sky-high whistle notes".

== Critical reception ==
Upon release, the song received positive reviews. Ethan Shafield from Variety stated that the song "opens with Carey’s silky vocals laid over softly plucked strings before simmering into an upbeat, piano and bass-driven chorus. Of course, Carey’s signature sky-high whistle notes are layered throughout the bridge". You Know I Got Soul stated that the song "is a fun and nostalgic song that features all three tapping into what they do best. The beat change from slow burn to up-tempo jam during the chorus is epic as well".

Ludovic Hunter-Tilney from Financial Times described the track as "a luxuriant throwback featuring harp, lightly splashy keyboards, finger clicks and a tidy hip-hop soul beat. It finds the singer responding to heartbreak in inimitable fashion, with honeyed vocals and extravagant outbreaks of background whistle singing".

== Commercial performance ==
"Somewhat Loved" became Jam and Lewis' third consecutive entry on the US Billboard Adult R&B Songs chart, peaking at number nine, and giving Jam and Lewis their second consecutive top-ten hit on the chart. It also gave Carey her 15th top-ten hit on the chart, and her first since "With You" (2018). Additionally, the song peaked at number 30 on the US R&B/Hip-Hop Airplay chart.

== Charts ==
=== Weekly charts ===
Chart (2021)	Peak position
US R&B/Hip-Hop Airplay (Billboard)	30

=== Year-end charts ===
Chart (2021)	Position
US Adult R&B Songs (Billboard)	28
