= HITAC =

Hitachi computer model designation

HITAC (HItachi Transistor Automatic Computer) is the designation for the majority of Hitachi large and midrange computer models spanning several decades. The HITAC 301, released in May 1958, was Hitachi's first fully transistorized computer model. Earlier Hitachi computers made use of semiconductors known as parametrons.

== Beginnings ==
Hitachi Ltd. (now referred to as Hitachi), first began research in analog computers in 1951 with digital computers following in 1956. As a prototype for the parametron logic circuit, the HIPAC-MK-1 was developed. The main transmission lines designed by Tadami power development utilized these as tensiometers. It was then that as Parametron calculators, the HIPAC 101 and HIPAC 103 became commercialized products. Parallel research in transistor computers soon became commercialized as well.

HIPAC MK-1（1957）
38 bit-words. fixed-point number. 1024 words of drum memory.
HIPAC 101（1960）
42 bit-words. fixed-point number. 2048 words of drum memory. In Paris, 1959, Automath was exhibited.
HIPAC 103（1961）
48 bit-words. fixed/floating-point. 1024/4096 words of Magnetic-core memory. (8192 words of drum memory).

As a base, the ETL Mark IV transistorized computer model was introduced and was the first commercialized in 1959. The Japan Electronics and Information Technology Industries Association produced this model intended for business use. In the following year, the HITAC 501 was released and now supplies the Eastern Osaka Kansai Electric substation as a control system. Additionally, the Electric Testing Lab still accepts orders for the ETL Mark V. Using this as a base, researchers at the University of Kyoto cooperated to improve the technology which resulted in the HITAC 102 (also referred to as the Kyoto-Daigaku Digital Computer 1). Researchers at Japan's Economic Planning Agency introduced an improved version (HITAC 102B) as a substitute to the punch card system. In 1961, the HITAC 201 was developed as a smaller computer for business use.

HITAC 301（1959）
BCD12 fixed decimal point expression. 1960 words of drum memory. (High speed access of 60 words is possible)
HITAC 501（1960）
First computer as a control system （Insufficient Details）
HITAC 102（1960）
ETL Mark V prototype
HITAC 201 （1961）
BCD11 fixed decimal point expression. 4000 words of drum memory.

Moreover, in 1958, The Railway Technical Research Institute of Japan dispatched MARS. Although the first version of MARS did not include the HITAC system, its successor MARS101 utilized the HITAC 3030. After that point, Hitachi consistently used it as its mainframe.
