= Nodesha =

American R&B singer (born 1985)

Nodesha (born Nodesha Felix; 1985 in San Bernardino, California) is an American R&B singer, who was signed to Arista Records when she was only sixteen years old. She released her debut album, Nodesha, in 2003. Jimmy Jam, Terry Lewis, and L.A. Reid were executive producers on the album. Nodesha co-wrote all of her songs. Nodesha released three singles: "Get It While It's Hot", "That's Crazy" and "Miss Perfect" featuring Five member Abs.

== Biography ==
Nodesha began performing at the age of six, initially performing as a backup dancer for R&B group Immature. In 2001, she auditioned for Flyte Tyme Records via Jimmy Jam and Terry Lewis. Lewis was initially unimpressed with her performance, and to receive their attention she started dancing on the table, which convinced them to give her a recording contract.

Her debut single "Get It While It's Hot" was released on August 20, 2003 on Arista Records. Her second single, "That's Crazy", was released exclusively in Japan on October 8, 2003.

Her debut album, Nodesha, was released on September 29, 2003. Whilst the majority of her debut album was produced by Jimmy Jam and Terry Lewis, other producers included Jermaine Dupri and Dallas Austin. The Japanese edition of the album includes two bonus tracks, "Shake 'Em" and "Rock Your Body", the latter of which was produced by Jermaine Dupri. To promote the album, Nodesha embarked on the FreshLook Fresh Faces tour along with singer Nikki Cleary. The album was also featured in Elle Girl.

== Discography ==
=== Albums ===
- Nodesha (2003)

=== Singles ===
Title	Year	Chart positions						
Title	Year	AUS	BEL (FL)	BEL (WA)	GER	IRE	NLD	UK
"Get It While It's Hot"	2003	45	26	26	96	—	20	55
"That's Crazy"	2003	—	—	—	—	—	—	—
"Miss Perfect" (Abs featuring Nodesha)	2003	—	—	—	—	13	—	5
