= Just Be Good to Me =

Single by The S.O.S. Band

from the album On the Rise
- B-side: "Just Be Good to Me (Instrumental Version)"
- Released: 1983
- Recorded: June 1983
- Studio: Master Sound Studio (Atlanta, Georgia)
- Genre: Electro-soul; post-disco; funk; R&B
- Length: 9:10 (album version); 4:10 (radio edit)
- Label: Tabu
- Songwriters: James Harris III; Terry Lewis
- Producer: Jimmy Jam and Terry Lewis

The S.O.S. Band singles chronology
"Groovin' (That's What We're Doin')" (1983)	"Just Be Good to Me" (1983)	"Tell Me If You Still Care" (1983)

"Just Be Good to Me" is a song by the S.O.S. Band, written and produced by Jimmy Jam and Terry Lewis for their fourth studio album, On the Rise (1983). "Just Be Good to Me" is a song by American funk and R&B group the S.O.S. Band, written and produced by Jimmy Jam and Terry Lewis. Released in March 1983 as the lead single from the group's fourth album On the Rise on Tabu Records, the song features lead vocals by Mary Davis. It peaked at number two on the Billboard Hot R&B/Hip-Hop Songs chart and number 55 on the Hot 100. The production was an early career milestone for Jam and Lewis, who were still members of the Time when they produced the album; their outside sessions for the S.O.S. Band contributed to Prince dismissing them from the group.

== Production ==
In the winter of 1983, Jam and Lewis, still members of the Time, began writing and recording demos on the side. Record executive Clarence Avant asked them to go to Atlanta during a break from touring to work with the S.O.S. Band. They recorded at Mastersound Studios, where they wrote and experimented with electronic instruments, and the sessions produced "Just Be Good to Me". Jam recalled that the band "didn't push back on anything" even though he and Lewis, then in their early twenties, were "telling grown people how to play a part"; lead singer Mary Davis said the producers "allowed us to be ourselves".

A snowstorm shut the Atlanta airport, stranding Jam and Lewis and causing them to miss a show with the Time. Prince fined them, and later fired them from the band after learning they had produced music for the S.O.S. Band. Lewis said that on the same night they were fired, the pair went to the studio and mixed "Just Be Good to Me".

The song's percussion and beats were produced using a Roland TR-808 drum machine.

== Critical reception ==
Daryl Easlea of Record Collector called "Just Be Good to Me" a "barnstorming electro-soul anthem". Amy Hanson of AllMusic described the song as "showstopping".

== Charts ==
=== Weekly charts ===
Weekly chart performance for "Just Be Good to Me"
Chart (1983–1984)	Peak position
Australia (Kent Music Report)	17
Belgium (Ultratop 50 Flanders)	29
Ireland (IRMA)	21
Netherlands (Dutch Top 40)	16
Netherlands (Single Top 100)	22
New Zealand (Recorded Music NZ)	10
UK Singles (Official Charts)	13
US Billboard Hot 100	55
US Hot Black Singles (Billboard)	2
US Hot Dance Club Play (Billboard)	3

=== Year-end charts ===
1984 year-end chart performance for "Just Be Good to Me"
Chart (1984)	Position
Australia (Kent Music Report)	77
New Zealand (Recorded Music NZ)	45

== Covers and samples ==
The song has subsequently been covered by several artists, including Deborah Cox (whose version reached number eight on the US Hot Dance Club Play chart), Mariah Carey (who performed it live on her 1993 Music Box Tour and 1996 Daydream Tour), Shayne Ward (who recorded it for his 2007 album Breathless), and Faithless in 2008 in a collaboration with Dido. In 2008, Australian artist Seany B released a version of this song, retitled as "B Good 2 Me". Cher Lloyd performed it on series seven of The X Factor. In 2011, the song was performed by Simone Battle on series one of The X Factor (US).

Tupac also sampled the track during the making of his 1995 album Me Against the World for track number 7, "Heavy in the Game" featuring Lady Levi and Richie Rich. The song was also sampled by rapper Silkk the Shocker for his 1998 single "Just Be Straight with Me", which also features Destiny's Child. Norman Cook, later known as Fatboy Slim, was involved with a very successful UK version with his band Beats International, who took the song to number one as "Dub Be Good to Me", which features a backing track consisting mainly of a sample of the Clash's "The Guns of Brixton". In 2010, Professor Green and Lily Allen released a cover reminiscent of Beats International's version titled "Just Be Good to Green".

In 2014, Usher quoted part of the lyrical melody in the song "She Came to Give It to You". In 1991, MC Lyte also referenced the song on her track "Poor Georgie" from the album Act Like You Know. In 2018, Cyantific released the album Bloodline which contains "Wild Child" featuring lyrics from the song.

In 2006, the song was remixed by the band Karmah with a mash-up of a sample of "Every Breath You Take" by the Police.
