= The S.O.S. Band =

American R&B and electro-funk group

- The SOS Band, 1991. L–R: Bruno Speight, Jason Bryant, Chandra Currelley and Abdul Ra-oof.

Background information
- Also known as: Santa Monica
- Origin: Atlanta, Georgia, U.S.
- Genres: Funk; R&B; post-disco; boogie
- Years active: 1977–present
- Label: Tabu
- Members: Mary Davis; Abdul Ra'oof
- Past members: Jason Bryant; Billy Ellis; James Earl Jones III; Willie "Sonny" Killebrew; John Simpson; Bruno Speight; Chandra Currelley

The S.O.S. Band (sometimes styled S.O.S. Band; shorthand for Sounds of Success) is an American R&B and electro-funk group formed in Atlanta, Georgia, in 1977. The original lineup featured Mary Davis (lead vocals), Jason Bryant (keyboards), Billy Ellis and Willie “Sonny” Killebrew (horns), Bruno Speight (guitar), John Simpson (bass), and James Earl Jones III (drums).

The group rose to prominence with their platinum debut single "Take Your Time (Do It Right)" in 1980—a post-disco, boogie-funk anthem that reached No. 1 on the U.S. R&B chart, No. 3 on the Billboard Hot 100, and was certified gold. Their self-titled debut album S.O.S. also achieved gold status.

Their signature sound evolved when they began working with producers Jimmy Jam and Terry Lewis in the early 1980s, leading to a string of hits such as "Just Be Good to Me", "Tell Me If You Still Care", and "The Finest".

Vocalist Mary Davis departed the group in 1987 to pursue a solo career; she was later replaced by Chandra Currelley, who led vocals on the albums Diamonds in the Raw (1989) and One of Many Nights (1991). The band's music has endured in influence and popularity; they remain recognized as key figures in 1980s R&B, alongside contemporaries such as Michael Jackson, Whitney Houston, and Prince.

== History ==
The Atlanta, Georgia, band was started in 1977, when keyboardist / vocalist Jason Bryant, saxophonists Billy Ellis and Willie "Sonny" Killebrew, guitarist Bruno Speight, bassist John Alexander Simpson, drummer James Earl Jones III, and lead vocalist Mary Davis formed a group called Sounds of Santa Monica that played at Atlanta nightclub the Regal Room.

Their manager (Bunnie Jackson-Ransom) sent a demo to Clarence Avant, head of Tabu Records. After signing the band to Tabu, Avant suggested that the band work with songwriter/producer Sigidi Abdullah. Abdullah was curious as to why an Atlanta-based band named itself Santa Monica. Keyboardist Jason Bryant replied that the band had an enjoyable concert in Santa Monica, California. Abdullah then came up with a new band name, The S.O.S. Band, with S.O.S. standing for "Sounds of Success".

Abdullah produced and co-wrote "Take Your Time (Do It Right)" – which went platinum – with Harold Clayton, the song parking at number one R&B for five weeks and peaking at number three pop on Billboard's charts in spring 1980. Their eponymous debut album, S.O.S., went gold, selling over 800,000 copies and holding the number two R&B spot for three weeks. While the band was on its world tour, trumpeter/vocalist/percussionist Abdul Ra'oof joined them. Their second album, Too, went to number 30 R&B in the summer of 1981.

On the band's third album, III, they worked with producer Leon Sylvers III and writers Jimmy Jam and Terry Lewis. Their breaking single, "High Hopes", hit number 25 R&B in the fall of 1982 while the album went to number 27 R&B in late 1982.

Jam and Lewis took over the production duties on their fourth album, On the Rise, scoring with the number two hit "Just Be Good to Me" (a song that would later be featured as the theme to Richard Pryor's stand-up film, "Here and Now", and in Grand Theft Auto IV's in-game radio, The Vibe 98.8), and the number five ballad "Tell Me If You Still Care". On the Rise became their second gold album, hitting number seven R&B in the summer of 1983.

The formula continued to work: Just the Way You Like It (including the number six R&B single "Just the Way You Like It") went to number six R&B in the fall of 1984 and Sands of Time (including the number two R&B hit "The Finest") went gold and hit number four R&B in the spring of 1986. Many of these releases, as well as the sound of early releases, helped to popularize the now-classic sound of the TR-808 Roland drum machine.

In late 1986, vocalist Mary Davis left the S.O.S. Band to pursue a solo career. In 1987, the band contributed a song called "It's Time to Move" to the Police Academy 4: Citizens on Patrol soundtrack. The band released their seventh album in 1989. For Diamonds in the Raw the lead vocalists were Chandra Currelley and Fredi Grace, and three producers were used (Curtis Williams, Eban Kelly & Jimi Randolph, Jason Bryant, and Sigidi). Saxophonist Billy Ellis, also one of the founder members, died during the recording of Diamonds in the Raw. The album reached number 43 on the R&B chart.

One of Many Nights, with lead vocalist Chandra Currelley and produced by Curtis Williams, followed in 1991. It failed to chart. Davis subsequently rejoined the band, performing on tours.

In 2021 Mary Davis took a leave of absence from the group after suffering a stroke. However, she has since returned to perform on selected dates. In October 2021, she joined original members of the group, along with more recent members, for a performance at a Birthday celebration for original drummer James Earl Jones III.

== Discography ==
All albums and singles listed below were issued on Tabu Records.

=== Studio albums ===
Year	Title	Label	Peak chart positions						Certifications
Year	Title	Label	US	US R&B	GER	NLD	NZ	UK	Certifications
1980	S.O.S.	Tabu/CBS	12	2	—	—	—	—	RIAA: Gold
1981	Too	Tabu/CBS	117	30	—	—	—	—	
1982	III	Tabu/CBS	172	27	—	—	—	—	
1983	On the Rise	Tabu/CBS	47	7	—	30	36	—	RIAA: Gold
1984	Just the Way You Like It	Tabu/CBS	60	6	44	33	—	29	
1986	Sands of Time	Tabu/CBS	44	4	20	38	36	15	RIAA: Gold
1989	Diamonds in the Raw	Tabu/CBS	194	43	—	—	—	—	
1991	One of Many Nights	Tabu/A&M/PolyGram	—	—	—	—	—	—	
"—" denotes a recording that did not chart or was not released in that territory.

=== Compilation albums ===
Year	Title	Peak chart positions		
Year	Title	US	US R&B	NLD
1986	The 12" Tape (Five 12" Mixes On One Cassette)	—	—	—
1987	1980–1987: The Hit Mixes	—	—	—
1989	In One Go	—	—	—
1990	The Very Best Of (1980–1990: A Decade of Dance Hits)	—	—	26
1995	The Best of the S.O.S. Band	185	27	—
2004	Greatest Hits	—	62	—
2011	Icon	—	—	—
2013	Very Best Of	—	—	—
2014	The Tabu Anthology	—	—	—
2015	Greatest	—	—	—
"—" denotes a recording that did not chart or was not released in that territory.

=== Singles ===
Year	Title	Peak chart positions										Certifications	Album
Year	Title	US	US R&B	US Dan	AUS	CAN	GER	IRE	NLD	NZ	UK	Certifications	Album
1980	"Take Your Time (Do It Right)"	3	1	1	40	27	40	—	26	3	51	RIAA: Platinum	S.O.S.
1980	"S.O.S. (Dit Dit Dit Dash Dash Dash Dit Dit Dit)"	—	20	54	—	—	—	—	—	—	—		S.O.S.
1981	"What's Wrong with Our Love Affair?"	—	87	—	—	—	—	—	—	—	—		S.O.S.
1981	"Do It Now"	—	15	—	—	—	—	—	—	—	—		Too
1981	"You"	—	64	—	—	—	—	—	—	—	—		Too
1982	"High Hopes"	—	25	49	—	—	—	—	—	—	—		III
1983	"Have It Your Way"	—	57	—	—	—	—	—	—	—	—		III
1983	"Groovin' (That's What We're Doin')"	—	—	47	—	—	—	—	—	—	72		III
1983	"Just Be Good to Me"	55	2	3	17	—	—	21	22	10	13		On the Rise
1983	"Tell Me If You Still Care"	65	5	—	—	—	—	—	39	—	81		On the Rise
1984	"For Your Love"	—	34	26	—	—	—	—	—	—	—		On the Rise
1984	"Just the Way You Like It"	64	6	26	—	—	34	—	42	50	32		Just the Way You Like It
1984	"No One's Gonna Love You"	102	15	—	—	—	—	—	—	—	—		Just the Way You Like It
1985	"Weekend Girl"	—	40	—	—	—	—	—	—	—	51		Just the Way You Like It
1985	"Break Up"	—	—	—	—	—	—	—	—	—	—		Just the Way You Like It
1986	"The Finest"	44	2	8	—	—	26	28	34	13	17		Sands of Time
1986	"Borrowed Love"	—	14	26	—	—	37	—	22	—	50		Sands of Time
1986	"Even When You Sleep"	—	34	—	—	—	—	—	—	—	—		Sands of Time
1986	"No Lies"	—	43	2	83	—	—	—	—	—	64		Sands of Time
1988	"The Official Bootleg Mega-Mix"	—	—	—	—	—	33	—	—	—	—		—N/a
1989	"I'm Still Missing Your Love"	—	7	—	—	—	—	—	25	—	—		Diamonds in the Raw
1990	"Secret Wish"	—	38	—	—	—	—	—	—	—	—		Diamonds in the Raw
1990	"Do You Love Me?"	—	—	—	—	—	—	—	—	—	—		Diamonds in the Raw
1991	"Sometimes I Wonder"	—	12	—	—	—	—	—	—	—	—		One of Many Nights
1991	"Broken Promises"	—	—	—	—	—	—	—	—	—	—		One of Many Nights
2017	"Just Get Ready"	—	—	—	—	—	—	—	—	—	—		—N/a
"—" denotes a recording that did not chart or was not released in that territory.

== See also ==
- List of number-one dance hits (United States)
- List of artists who reached number one on the US Dance chart
