= Angel Grant =

American singer

Angel Grant (born November 24, 1973) is an American neo soul and R&B singer. In 1998, her single "Lil Red Boat", produced by Jimmy Jam & Terry Lewis and James "Big Jim" Wright, became a top 50 hit on the Billboard Hot R&B/Hip-Hop Singles & Tracks and a top twenty hit on the BET network. Her debut album, Album, was written with Jam, Lewis, and Wright. Grant was the first artist signed to their newly created label Flyte Tyme Records.

== Discography ==
=== Albums ===
- Album (1998)
- My Journey Back (2010)

=== Singles ===
Title	Year	Peak positions		Album
Title	Year	Hot R&B/Hip-Hop Singles & Tracks	Billboard Hot 100	Album
"Lil Red Boat"	1998	48	104	Album
"Knockin'"	1998	-	-	Album
"I Wonder"	2010	-	-	My Journey Back
"—" denotes a release that did not chart.
