= Ann Nesby =

American singer and actress

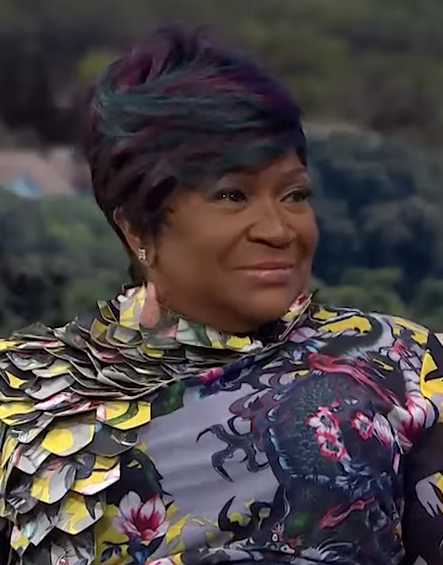
- Nesby in 2019

Background information
- Also known as: Lula Lee
- Born: Lula Ann Bennett; July 24, 1955 (age 71); Chicago, Illinois, U.S.
- Origin: Joliet, Illinois, U.S.
- Genres: R&B; gospel; dance
- Occupations: Singer; actress
- Instrument: Vocals
- Labels: Perspective; A&M; Universal Records; It's Time; Child

Ann Nesby (born Lula Ann Bennett; July 24, 1955) is an American singer, songwriter, actress, and producer known for her work in R&B, gospel, and dance music. She rose to fame as the lead vocalist of the Grammy Award-winning group Sounds of Blackness before launching a solo career that has earned her multiple Grammy nominations and critical acclaim.

Nesby has released eight solo studio albums, including her 2025 return project, ANNiversary, a collection of original R&B music centered on themes of love, emotional maturity, and empowerment.

Beyond music, Nesby is also known for her acting work in film and television, including appearances in Queen Sugar, Atlanta, The Ms. Pat Show, and the national tour of Tina: The Tina Turner Musical. In 2025, she executive produced and narrated the Oscar-qualifying documentary short CIRILO, A Legacy Untold, which explores the life of civil rights figure Cirilo McSween.

== Career ==
With Sounds of Blackness she performed lead vocals on notable tracks such as "I Believe," "Optimistic," "I'm Going All the Way," "Soul Holiday," and "The Pressure." The group's albums earned Grammy Awards in 1991 and 1993.

In 1996, Nesby released her debut solo album, I'm Here for You, which charted on the Billboard 200 and included several successful R&B and dance singles. That same year, her rendition of "Lovin’ Is Really My Game" reached number one on the Billboard Dance Club chart.

Throughout the 2000s, Nesby released a series of albums blending gospel, soul, and R&B, including This Is Love (2007) and The Lula Lee Project (2009), the latter debuting at No. 13 on the Billboard Gospel Albums chart. She earned additional Grammy nominations, including one for her duet with Calvin Richardson on "Love Has Finally Come at Last." The project was co-written and produced with RL (of Next) and longtime collaborator Brian "B-Flat" Cook. The album reflects themes of mature love and emotional reciprocity.

== Discography ==
- I'm Here for You (1996)
- Love Is What We Need: The Essentials (2001)
- Put It on Paper (2002)
- Make Me Better (2003)
- In the Spirit (2006)
- This Is Love (2007)
- The Lula Lee Project (2009)
- Living My Life (2014)
- ANNiversary (2025)

== Selected filmography ==
=== Film ===
- The Fighting Temptations (2003) – Aunt Sally Walker
- Let God Be the Judge (2010) – Angel (uncredited)
- What My Husband Doesn't Know (2012) – Elenor
- God of Dreams (2022) – Grandma Mae
- CIRILO, A Legacy Untold (2025) – Narrator / Executive Producer

=== Television ===
- Hap and Leonard (2018) – Blind Tillie (3 episodes)
- Mamas Girls (2020) – Mama
- Queen Sugar (2021–2022) – Sandy Leflore (9 episodes)
- Atlanta (2022) – Evelyn
- The Ms. Pat Show (2024) – Loy Webb
- Corinthia (2024) – Helen

== Awards and nominations ==
- 2 Grammy Awards with Sounds of Blackness (1991, 1993)
- 6 Grammy nominations as a solo artist
- Billboard Dance Club No. 1 – "Lovin’ Is Really My Game" (2000)

== Chart performance ==
=== Billboard 200 ===
- I'm Here for You – No. 157 (1996)
- Put It on Paper – No. 62 (2002)

=== Top R&B/Hip-Hop Albums ===
- I'm Here for You – No. 27
- Put It on Paper – No. 8
- In the Spirit – No. 72
- This Is Love – No. 37
- The Lula Lee Project – No. 57

=== R&B/Hip-Hop Airplay Highlights ===
- "I'll Do Anything For You" – No. 51
- "Put It on Paper" (ft. Al Green) – No. 44
- "I Apologize" – No. 61

== Other sources ==
- "Ann Nesby releases 'Ain't Gotta Worry' from upcoming album". UrbanBridgez. March 28, 2025.
- Rizik, Chris (January 2025). "First Listen: Ann Nesby, 'My Man'". SoulTracks.
- "Amerie, Keri Hilson, Ari Lennox & More: New R&B". VIBE. January 2025.
- "Ann Nesby on playing Grandma in Tina, the Queen Sugar finale and more". Eldredge ATL. February 22, 2023.
- "Sounds of Blackness and Ann Nesby Remain Optimistic 30 Years Later". Rated R&B. May 2021.
