= Belita Woods =

American singer (1948 – 2012)

Belita Woods with Parliament-Funkadelic, September 2009

Belita Karen Woods (October 23, 1948 – May 14, 2012) was a lead singer of the late 1970s R&B group Brainstorm. She also performed with Parliament-Funkadelic for two decades, beginning in 1992.

Brainstorm had a disco hit in 1977 called "Lovin' Is Really My Game". Their follow-up album, 1978's Journey to the Light, featured a more soul-funk sound, anchored by the album tracks "We're On Our Way Home" and "If You Ever Need To Cry". Prior to joining Brainstorm, Woods released a single "Magic Corner"/"Grounded" on Detroit's Moira label in 1967.

She recorded briefly with the psychedelic soul group The Undisputed Truth in 1990, when original members Joe Harris and Brenda Joyce Evans reformed the group for Ian Levine and his Motown revival label Motorcity Records. She is female lead singer on their 1991 single, a rerecorded version of the group's 1973 song "Law of the Land".

Woods began touring with the P-Funk All-Stars in 1992. In 2001 she sang on four songs ("Scratched", "When Jack Met Jill", "Relax", "Tempovision") on French DJ/producer Étienne de Crécy's Tempovision album. The song "Scratched" was produced by fellow P-Funk mate Michael "Clip" Payne, who also sang on the song "Tempovision". She had three solo songs on George Clinton's How Late Do U Have 2BB4UR Absent?, released in 2005: "Don't Dance Too Close", "More Than Words Can Say" and "Saddest Day".

Woods died of heart failure on May 14, 2012. She was 63.
