= Tabu Records =

American record label

- Parent company: Demon Music Group
- Founded: 1975
- Founder: Clarence Avant
- Defunct: 1999
- Status: Defunct
- Distributors: RCA Records (1977–1978); CBS Records (1978–1991); A&M Records (1991–1993); Motown Records (1993–1996)
- Genre: Funk, Rhythm and blues, soul music, post disco
- Country of origin: United States
- Location: Los Angeles, California

Tabu Productions was an American record label founded by Clarence Avant in 1975. It focused on R&B and funk.

== History ==
Avant founded the label after Sussex Records went out of business in June 1975. Tabu Record's flagship release, Stormin' by Brainstorm, was released in 1977. Tabu Records had a short-lived distribution pact with RCA, which lasted a year before moving to CBS Records.

The label focused on R&B and funk but expanded into other genres such as jazz and disco. Its artists included the Argentine composer and pianist Lalo Schifrin, who composed and scored theme songs for numerous television series, including Mission: Impossible, and released two projects on Tabu ("No One Home", 1979) and the S.O.S. Band ("Take Your Time (Do It Right)," 1980) Jazz singer Sharon Ridley (Full Moon), pianist Manfredo Fest.

Jimmy Jam and Terry Lewis were hired to produce the S.O.S. Band's fourth studio album for Tabu, On the Rise (1983), which was certified gold on January 16, 1984. While recording in S.O.S.'s home stomping grounds in Atlanta, Georgia, on March 24, 1983, a freak snowstorm hit, grounding all flights from the city. The duo was scheduled to perform as a part of the Time in San Antonio at the Hemisfair Arena that night but couldn't make it. Subsequently, Prince, who owned and managed the Time, fired them on April 18, 1983. The duo stayed in Los Angeles and became songwriter-producers for artists like New Edition, Boyz II Men and most notably, Janet Jackson.

Working with Jam and Lewis gave Tabu a much-needed shot in the arm. They brought Cherrelle and Alexander O'Neal (the original Time lead vocalist) to the label and both did well; O'Neal released his self-titled studio album in 1985, and Cherrelle's Fragile hit the American R&B charts in 1984. The SOS Band had more hits with "Just The Way You Like It" in 1984 and "Sands of Time" in 1986, the album of which was certified gold on April 6, 1987. So influential was the sound that Robert Palmer covered Cherrelle's "I Didn't Mean to Turn You On" in 1986, and Beats International covered the S.O.S. Band's "Just Be Good to Me" in 1990. In 1985, Cherrelle and Alexander O'Neal dueted on "Saturday Love," which was a hit in the UK but caught on later with American radio. Other acts like Kid Fire and Demetrius Perry recorded on this label.

== Sony era ==
Tabu Records, in its deal with CBS, became associated with Sony Music Entertainment in November 1987 when the Japanese group bought CBS Records. During this period, Tabu released Diamonds in the Raw (1989) by the S.O.S. Band, which performed disappointingly. In 1991, Alexander O'Neal's All True Man was the last album Tabu Records released under the new Sony regime.

== A&M era ==
In 1991, the label resurfaced under PolyGram's A&M Records, who distributed it from 1991 until 1993, releasing four albums and about 20 singles. Avant was hired to run Motown (another PolyGram label), and, in August 1993, he brought Tabu Records under its aegis. It released collections by the S.O.S. Band, Alexander O'Neal and Cherelle, while signing other artists such as Lucky Dube and Identity Crisis. However, this reappearance was short-lived as well.

In 1999, Seagram bought PolyGram and merged it with the MCA family of labels, which became Universal Music Group. Shortly after, Tabu Records was absorbed into A&M Records.

== Re-issues ==
In 2002, Avant brought Tabu Records to EMI's reissue label the Right Stuff, which began to re-release Tabu Record's catalogue.

In 2012, Demon Music Group announced it acquired the licensing rights of the Tabu Records catalogue. The company announced the news on Facebook on Valentine's Day 2013 and released a trailer of the label's return on YouTube. The licensing agreements come with reissues of the entire catalog on compact disc as well as digital download and Vinyl. The Tabu catalogue of Alexander O'Neal and Cherrelle were made available on iTunes in Fall 2012.

Greatest-hits albums by the S.O.S. Band, Cherelle, and Alexander O’Neal were released through Universal Music, as part of its Icon series, during 2012.

== See also ==
- List of record labels
