= Alexander O'Neal discography =

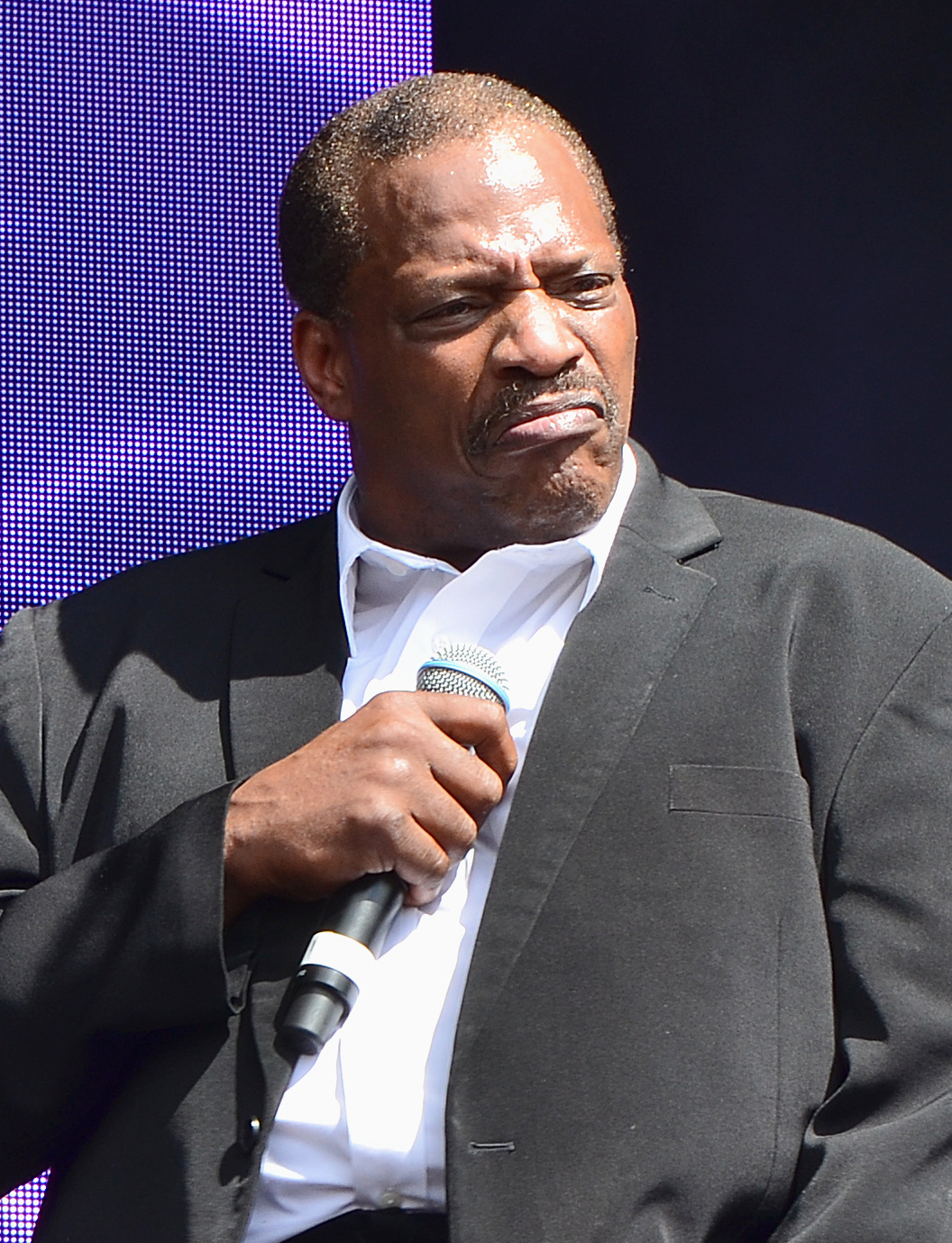
- O'Neal performing in 2014
- Studio albums: 9
- Live albums: 3
- Compilation albums: 9
- Remix albums: 1
- Singles: 37

The discography of American R&B singer Alexander O'Neal includes nine studio albums, three live albums, nine compilation albums, one remix album and thirty-seven singles. O'Neal rose to prominence in the mid–1980s following the release of his self–titled debut album which was released in March 1985. It marked the beginning of a long production collaboration with renowned producers Jimmy Jam and Terry Lewis. The album spawned the commercially successful singles "Innocent", "If You Were Here Tonight" and "A Broken Heart Can Mend". Critically, the album was received favourably by critics, whilst commercially, it was successful, peaking at number ninety-two on the US Billboard 200 and nineteen in the United Kingdom, where it was certified Gold by the British Phonographic Industry (BPI).

In October 1985, he released "Saturday Love", a collaboration with singer Cherrelle. The release would give O'Neal his highest charting peak position in the United States after it peaked at number twenty–six on the Billboard Hot 100. His commercial dominance continued with the release of his second album, Hearsay (1987). Like his debut, it was received in a favourable manner by music critics, and became more successful than his preceding release. It reached the top five in the United Kingdom, and the top twenty in territories including Sweden and Norway. In the United States, it peaked at number twenty–nine on the Billboard 200 albums charts and was certified Gold by the Recording Industry Association of America (RIAA). During this period, his chart dominance on the Billboard Hot 100 charts in the United States increased with the release of singles including "Fake", "Criticize" and "Never Knew Love Like This". Other singles from Hearsay included "The Lovers" and "(What Can I Say) To Make You Love Me", both of which achieved commercial success in the United Kingdom.

In 1988, he released his first Christmas album, My Gift to You, followed by his fourth album All True Man (1991), which became his highest charting album in the United Kingdom where it peaked at number two and was later certified Gold by the BPI. In the United States, it peaked at number forty-nine on the Billboard 200, and was certified Gold by the RIAA for sales in excess of 500,000 copies. All True Man marked his last collaboration with producers Jimmy Jam and Terry Lewis, and by the release of his fifth album Love Makes No Sense (1993), O'Neal had recruited producers such as Steve Lindsey for the album. Whilst it achieved moderate commercial success in countries including the United Kingdom, the Netherlands and Sweden, it the United States it failed to match the success of his previous efforts, peaking at number eighty-nine on the Billboard 200. It did, however, peak at number eighteen on the US Top R&B/Hip-Hop Albums.

During the 1990s, O'Neal's career began a commercial decline, with subsequent albums Lovers Again (1996) and Saga of a Married Man (2002) achieved little commercial success. In January 2008, he released his eight album, Alex Loves... which returned him to the albums charts in the United Kingdom, peaking at number forty-nine. His ninth album, Five Questions: The New Journey, was released in October 2010.

== Albums ==
=== Studio albums ===
| Title | Details | Peak chart positions | | | | | | | | | | Certifications |
| Title | Details | US | US R&B | AUS | AUT | GER | NL | NOR | NZ | SWE | UK | Certifications |
|---|---|---|---|---|---|---|---|---|---|---|---|---|
| Alexander O'Neal | Released: 8 March 1985; Label: Tabu, Epic; Formats: Cassette, LP | 92 | 21 | — | — | — | 72 | — | — | — | 19 | BPI: Gold |
| Hearsay | Released: 29 July 1987; Label: Tabu (Worldwide) Epic (Greece only); Formats: Cassette, LP | 29 | 2 | 142 | 22 | 22 | 26 | 18 | 47 | 13 | 4 | RIAA: Gold; BPI: 3× Platinum |
| My Gift to You | Released: 11 November 1988; Label: Tabu; Formats: Cassette, LP | 149 | 54 | — | — | — | — | — | — | 26 | 53 | |
| All True Man | Released: 25 January 1991; Label: Tabu; Formats: Cassette, LP | 49 | 3 | 108 | — | 36 | 26 | — | — | 20 | 2 | RIAA: Gold; BPI: Gold |
| Love Makes No Sense | Released: 9 February 1993; Label: Tabu, A&M; Formats: Cassette, LP | 89 | 18 | — | — | 80 | 45 | — | — | 49 | 14 | |
| Lovers Again | Released: September 1996; Label: EMI, Victor, Groove Society, Ichiban Records; Formats: CD, cassette | — | 60 | — | — | 63 | — | — | — | — | 119 | |
| Saga of a Married Man | Released: 8 February 2002; Label: Eagle; Formats: CD, digital download | — | — | — | — | — | — | — | — | — | 160 | |
| Alex Loves... | Released: 28 January 2008; Label: EMI; Formats: CD, digital download | — | — | — | — | — | — | — | — | — | 49 | |
| Five Questions: The New Journey | Released: 4 October 2010; Label: CC Entertainment; Formats: CD, digital download | — | — | — | — | — | — | — | — | — | 72 | |
"—" denotes a recording that did not chart or was not released in that territory.

=== Live albums ===
- Live at the Hammersmith Apollo – London (2005, Eminence)
- Live in Minneapolis (2011, CC Entertainment)
- Live at the Palladium (2019, independent digital release)

=== Compilation albums ===
| Year | Title | Peak chart positions | | | | Certifications |
| Year | Title | US | US R&B | SCO | UK | Certifications |
|---|---|---|---|---|---|---|
| 1992 | Twelve Inch Mixes | — | — | — | — | |
| 1992 | This Thing Called Love: The Greatest Hits of Alexander O'Neal | — | 89 | — | 4 | BPI: Gold |
| 1995 | The Best of Alexander O'Neal | — | 76 | — | — | |
| 2004 | Greatest Hits | — | 59 | 41 | 12 | BPI: Gold |
| 2011 | Icon | — | 71 | — | — | |
| 2013 | Very Best Of | — | — | — | — | |
| 2015 | Greatest | — | — | — | — | |
| 2018 | The Lost Tapes | — | — | — | — | |
"—" denotes a recording that did not chart or was not released in that territory.

=== Remix albums ===
| Year | Title | Peak chart positions | |
| Year | Title | US | US R&B |
|---|---|---|---|
| 1987 | All Mixed Up | 185 | 67 |

== Singles ==
| Year | Title | Peak chart positions | | | | | | | | | | Certifications | Album |
| Year | Title | US | US R&B | US Dan | GER | IRE | NL | NOR | NZ | SWI | UK | Certifications | Album |
|---|---|---|---|---|---|---|---|---|---|---|---|---|---|
| 1985 | "Innocent" | – (Note: "Innocent" did not chart within the Billboard Hot 100 charts, but did peak at number 1 on the US Bubbling Under Hot 100 which acts as an extension to the Billboard Hot 100) | 11 | — | — | — | — | — | — | — | — | | Alexander O'Neal |
| 1985 | "If You Were Here Tonight" | — | 17 | — | — | 20 | — | — | 42 | — | 13 | | Alexander O'Neal |
| 1985 | "A Broken Heart Can Mend" | — | 62 | — | — | — | — | — | — | — | 53 | | Alexander O'Neal |
| 1985 | "Saturday Love" (with Cherrelle) | 26 | 2 | 13 | — | 7 | — | — | 4 | — | 6 | | High Priority |
| 1986 | "What's Missing" | — | 8 | 40 | — | — | — | — | — | — | 90 | | Alexander O'Neal |
| 1986 | "You Were Meant to Be My Lady (Not My Girl)" | — | 32 | — | — | — | — | — | — | — | 98 | | Alexander O'Neal |
| 1987 | "Fake" | 25 | 1 | 7 | 17 | — | 20 | — | 16 | 22 | 33 | | Hearsay |
| 1987 | "Criticize" | 70 | 4 | 21 | 24 | 14 | 17 | 10 | 40 | — | 4 | BPI: Gold | Hearsay |
| 1988 | "Never Knew Love Like This" (with Cherrelle) | 28 | 2 | 24 | 49 | — | 24 | — | — | — | 26 | | Hearsay |
| 1988 | "The Lovers" | — | 41 | — | — | — | — | — | — | — | 28 | | Hearsay |
| 1988 | "(What Can I Say) To Make You Love Me" | — | 68 | 32 | — | — | — | — | — | — | 27 | | Hearsay |
| 1988 | "Fake '88" | — | — | — | — | 23 | — | — | — | — | 16 | | All Mixed Up |
| 1988 | "The Christmas Song" / "Thank You for a Good Year" | — | 28 | — | — | 24 | — | — | — | — | 30 | | My Gift to You |
| 1988 | "Our First Christmas" | — | 53 | — | — | — | — | — | — | — | — | | My Gift to You |
| 1989 | "Hearsay '89" | — | — | — | — | — | — | — | — | — | 56 | | All Mixed Up |
| 1989 | "Sunshine" | — | — | — | — | — | — | — | — | — | 72 | | Hearsay |
| 1989 | "Hit Mix (Official Bootleg Mega-Mix)" | — | — | — | 43 | 24 | — | — | — | — | 19 | | —N/a |
| 1990 | "Saturday Love" (Feelin' Luv Mix) (with Cherrelle) | — | — | — | — | — | — | — | — | — | 55 | | —N/a |
| 1991 | "All True Man" | 43 | 5 | — | — | — | 20 | — | — | — | 18 | | All True Man |
| 1991 | "What Is This Thing Called Love?" | — | 21 | 10 | — | — | 81 | — | — | — | 53 | | All True Man |
| 1991 | "Shame on Me" | — | 30 | — | — | — | — | — | — | — | 71 | | All True Man |
| 1991 | "The Yoke (G.U.O.T.R.)" | — | 73 | — | — | — | — | — | — | — | — | | All True Man |
| 1991 | "Every Time I Get Up" | — | 56 | — | — | — | — | — | — | — | — | | All True Man |
| 1992 | "Sentimental" | — | 31 | — | — | — | — | — | — | — | 53 | | All True Man |
| 1993 | "Love Makes No Sense" | – (Note: "Love Makes No Sense" did not chart within the Billboard Hot 100 charts, but did peak at number 8 on the US Bubbling Under Hot 100 which acts as an extension to the Billboard Hot 100) | 13 | 45 | — | — | — | — | — | — | 26 | | Love Makes No Sense |
| 1993 | "In the Middle" | — | 26 | — | — | — | — | — | — | — | 32 | | Love Makes No Sense |
| 1993 | "Aphrodisia" | — | 48 | — | — | — | — | — | — | — | — | | Love Makes No Sense |
| 1993 | "All That Matters to Me" | — | — | — | 51 | — | — | — | — | — | 67 | | Love Makes No Sense |
| 1993 | "Since I've Been Lovin' You" | — | — | — | 51 | — | — | — | — | — | — | | Love Makes No Sense |
| 1996 | "Let's Get Together" | — | 21 | — | — | — | — | — | — | — | 38 | | Lovers Again |
| 1997 | "Baby Come to Me" (with Cherrelle) | — | 28 | — | — | — | — | — | — | — | 56 | | Lovers Again |
| 1998 | "Lovers Again" | — | 54 | — | — | — | — | — | — | — | — | | Lovers Again |
| 1998 | "Grind" | — | 83 | — | — | — | — | — | — | — | — | | Lovers Again |
| 1998 | "Criticize" ('98 Mix) | — | — | — | — | — | — | — | — | — | 51 | | —N/a |
| 2002 | "You're Gonna Miss Me" | — | — | — | — | — | — | — | — | — | — | | Saga of a Married Man |
| 2006 | "Lord" | — | — | — | — | — | — | — | — | — | — | | —N/a |
| 2016 | "Fake" (with Mamma Freedom) | — | — | — | — | — | — | — | — | — | — | | —N/a |
| 2023 | "Love Finds a Way" (with Mamma Freedom) | — | — | — | — | — | — | — | — | — | — | | —N/a |
"—" denotes a recording that did not chart or was not released in that territory.
