= This Thing Called Love: The Greatest Hits of Alexander O'Neal =

Greatest hits album by Alexander O'Neal
- Released: 1992
- Genre: R&B; funk; soul
- Length: 61:45
- Label: Tabu
- Producer: Jimmy Jam and Terry Lewis; Jellybean Johnson; Monte Moir

Alexander O'Neal chronology
Twelve Inch Mixes (1992)	This Thing Called Love: The Greatest Hits of Alexander O'Neal (1992)	Love Makes No Sense (1993)

Professional ratings
Review scores
Source	Rating
AllMusic	4/5 stars

This Thing Called Love: The Greatest Hits of Alexander O'Neal is a greatest hits album by American recording artist Alexander O'Neal, released in 1992 by Tabu Records. It includes tracks from three of O'Neal's previous studio albums: Alexander O'Neal (1985), Hearsay (1987) and All True Man (1991).

== Track listing ==
All tracks written by James Harris III and Terry Lewis, except where noted.

No.	Title	Writer(s)	Length
1.	"Criticize"	Garry Johnson; Alexander O'Neal	4:00
2.	"Fake '88"		3:53
3.	"A Broken Heart Can Mend"		3:40
4.	"Hearsay '89"		3:40
5.	"(What Can I Say) To Make You Love Me"		4:25
6.	"Sunshine"		4:02
7.	"What's Missing"		4:06
8.	"If You Were Here Tonight"	Monte Moir	3:40
9.	"Never Knew Love Like This" (with Cherrelle)		3:22
10.	"All True Man"		4:04
11.	"The Lovers"		3:50
12.	"Crying Overtime"		4:55
13.	"What Is This Thing Called Love"		4:08
14.	"Innocent"		5:05
15.	"Sentimental"		4:36

== Personnel ==
- Track 1 produced by Jellybean Johnson for Flyte Time Productions Inc.
- Tracks 2–7 and 9–15 produced by Jimmy Jam and Terry Lewis for Flyte Time Productions Inc.
- Track 8 produced by Monte Moir

== Charts and certifications ==
=== Weekly charts ===
Chart (1992)	Peak position
UK Albums Chart	4

=== Certifications ===
Region	Certification	Certified units/sales
United Kingdom (BPI)	Gold	100,000^{^}
^{^} Shipments figures based on certification alone.

== Release history ==
Label	Cat. No.		Format	Date
Tabu	ZK 53833	^{US}	CD	1992
Tabu	471 714	^{EU}	CD, Vinyl, Minidisc, Cassette	1992
Tabu	SRCS-6523	^{JP}	CD	1992
