= Greatest Hits (Alexander O'Neal album) =

Greatest hits album by Alexander O'Neal
- Released: August 23, 2004 (U.K.); August 24, 2004 (U.S.)
- Recorded: 1984–1992
- Genre: R&B
- Length: 77:23
- Label: Tabu/Virgin
- Producer: Jimmy Jam & Terry Lewis

Alexander O'Neal chronology
Saga of a Married Man (2002)	Greatest Hits (2004)	Live At The Hammersmith Apollo, London (2005)

Professional ratings
Review scores
Source	Rating
AllMusic	link

Greatest Hits is a singles compilation album by American recording artist Alexander O'Neal, released on 23 August 2004. Greatest Hits comprises fifteen best-selling singles released between 1985 and 1993.

== Track listing ==
All songs written and composed by James Harris and Terry Lewis, except where noted.

1. "Never Knew Love Like This" – 5:16
2. "Innocent / Alex 9000 / Innocent II" – 10:33
3. "Fake" – 4:02
4. "All True Man" – 5:05
5. "Criticize" (Alexander O'Neal, Garry Johnson) – 4:04
6. "Saturday Love" (Cherrelle featuring Alexander O'Neal) – 5:01
7. "If You Were Here Tonight" (Monte Moir) – 6:05
8. "Hearsay '89" – 3:42
9. "(What Can I Say) To Make You Love Me" – 4:31
10. "The Lovers" – 4:44
11. "What's Missing" – 5:44
12. "A Broken Heart Can Mend" – 3:45
13. "What is This Thing Called Love?" – 6:07
14. "You Were Meant to Be My Lady (Not My Girl)" – 4:12
15. "Love Makes No Sense" (Tony Tolbert, Lance Alexander) – 4:23

== Charts ==
=== Peak positions ===
Original release

Chart	Peak Position
UK Albums Chart	12
Scottish Albums Chart	41
US Top R&B/Hip-Hop Albums	59

== Sales and certifications ==
Region	Certification	Certified units/sales
United Kingdom (BPI)	Gold	100,000^{^}
^{^} Shipments figures based on certification alone.
