= All Mixed Up (Alexander O'Neal album) =

Remix album by Alexander O'Neal
- Released: 1988
- Recorded: 1984–1987
- Studio: Flyte Time Productions, Inc. Studio A & B, Minneapolis, Minnesota
- Genre: Electronic; R&B; funk; soul
- Length: 1:07:35
- Label: Tabu, Epic
- Producer: Jimmy Jam; Terry Lewis; Jellybean Johnson

Alexander O'Neal chronology
Hearsay (1987)	All Mixed Up (1988)	My Gift to You (1988)

Professional ratings
Review scores
Source	Rating
AllMusic	2/5 stars

Hearsay - All Mixed Up (also known as All Mixed Up') is a remix album consisting of songs performed by American recording artist Alexander O'Neal. It was originally released in 1988, by Tabu and Epic. It collects together single remixes of tracks taken from O'Neal's critically and commercially successful 1987 album Hearsay. CD and cassette releases contain bonus tracks featuring contemporary remixes of songs from the earlier Alexander O'Neal album.

== Track listing ==
1. "Fake 88 (House Mix)"
2. "(What Can I Say) To Make You Love Me (Hateful Club Mix)"
3. "Never Knew Love Like This (Extended Version)" – (featuring Cherrelle)
4. "Criticize (Ben Liebrand Remix)"
5. "The Lovers (Extended Version)"
6. "Criticize (Remix)"
7. "(What Can I Say) To Make You Love Me (Ben Liebrand Remix)"
8. "Fake (Extended Version)"
9. "You Were Meant to Be My Lady (88 Keith Cohen Extended Remix)"
10. "Innocent (88 Keith Cohen House Mix)"
- LP contains tracks 1–8 only.
- On the USA version the track one title is "Fake 89 (House Mix)" due to the album being released in 1989.
- The 1990 Japan release contains an extra track called "Hitmix (The Official Bootleg Mega Mix - 7 Inch Version)".

== Charts ==
Chart	Peak Position
US Billboard Pop Albums	185
US Top R&B Albums	67

== Release history ==
Label	Cat. No.		Format	Date
Tabu	463196	^{EU}	CD, Vinyl, Cassette	1988
Tabu	25DP 5376	^{JP}	CD	1988
Tabu	ZK 44492	^{US}	CD, Vinyl, Cassette	1989
Tabu	CSCS 5114	^{JP}	CD	1990
Tabu	TABU 1009	^{UK}	CD, Vinyl	2013
Solid	CDSOL-5236	^{JP}	CD	2014
