= Sunshine (Alexander O'Neal song) =

Single by Alexander O'Neal

from the album Hearsay
- Released: 1989
- Recorded: 1986
- Genre: R&B
- Length: 5:59 (album version); 4:02 (single version)
- Label: Tabu
- Songwriter: Jimmy Jam and Terry Lewis
- Producer: Jimmy Jam and Terry Lewis

Alexander O'Neal singles chronology
"Hearsay" (1989)	"Sunshine" (1989)	"Hit Mix (Official Bootleg Mega-Mix)" (1989)

"Sunshine" is a song written by Jimmy Jam and Terry Lewis and recorded by American recording artist Alexander O'Neal. It is the sixth and final single from O'Neal's second solo studio album, Hearsay (1987). Following the successful chart performances of the Hearsay singles "Fake", "Criticize", "Never Knew Love Like This", "The Lovers", and "(What Can I Say) To Make You Love Me", the single was released as an EP titled Sunshine and Rain. Despite its success on US radio, it was the album's poorest-selling single in the UK, peaking at No. 72. The song had been performed live prior to the song's release with Level 42 at the Prince's Trust Gala on 25 July 1989.

== Track listing ==
- 7" Single (655191 7)
1. "Sunshine (Edit)" - 4:02
2. "When The Party's Over" - 3:29
- 12" Single (655191 6) / CD Single (655191 2)
1. "Sunshine (Edit)" - 4:02
2. "Do You Wanna Like I Do" - 4:48
3. "Crying Overtime" - 5:20
4. "A Broken Heart Can Mend" - 3:40

== Personnel ==
Credits are adapted from the album's liner notes.

- Jimmy Jam - drum and keyboard programming, keyboards, percussion
- Terry Lewis - percussion, backing vocals
- Randy Ran - backing vocals
