= All Mixed Up =

All Mixed Up may refer to:

== Songs ==
- "All Mixed Up" (311 song)
- "All Mixed Up" (The Cars song)
- "All Mixed Up", a song by Gayle and Gillian Blakeney
- "All Mixed Up", a song by Pete Seeger

== Albums ==
- All Mixed Up (Gospel Gangstaz album)
- All Mixed Up (EP), an EP by Korn
- All Mixed Up: Los Remixes, an album by A.B. Quintanilla III Y Los Kumbia Kings
- All Mixed Up (Alexander O'Neal album), 1987

== Television and film ==
- "All Mixed Up" (Barney & Friends), an episode of Barney & Friends
- "All Mixed Up" (Cougar Town), the first episode of Season 2 Cougar Town
- All Mixed Up (film), a French comedy film of 1985

== See also ==
- The Whole SHeBANG: All Mixed Up, an album by SHeDAISY
