= I Need Your Loving =

Single by the Human League

from the album Crash
- Released: 10 November 1986
- Recorded: 1986
- Studio: Flyte Time (Minneapolis, Minnesota)
- Genre: R&B
- Length: 3:43
- Label: Virgin
- Songwriters: James Harris III; Terry Lewis; David Eiland; Langston Richey; Danny Williams; Herman Davis
- Producer: Jimmy Jam and Terry Lewis

The Human League singles chronology
"Human" (1986)	"I Need Your Loving" (1986)	"Love Is All That Matters" (1988)

"I Need Your Loving" is a song by the English synth-pop band the Human League, released as the second single from their fifth studio album, Crash (1986). The song was written by Jimmy Jam, Terry Lewis, David Eiland, Langston Richey, Danny Williams and Herman Davis (a.k.a. Randy Ran).

== Background ==
As were many other tracks from the album, "I Need Your Loving" was aimed towards the US market, where the first single from Crash, "Human", had reached number one. The single was recorded at the Flyte Time studios Minneapolis under the production of Jimmy Jam and Terry Lewis while the Human League had been in residence from February until April 1986. In the UK it only reached number 72 in the charts. The song was savaged by critics at the time and has been largely disowned by the band since.

== Music video ==
The video for "I Need Your Loving" was recorded on a very limited budget compared to previous Human League videos. It was directed by Andy Morahan, who had done the previous video for "Human". In many ways the video is a rehash of the video for "The Lebanon", being filmed at a fake concert/studio appearance to an audience of extras. The camera swings wildly around the band as they play the song, and continually focuses in and out in time with the music.

== Track listing ==
7" vinyl (Virgin VS900)

1. "I Need Your Loving" – 3:43
2. "I Need Your Loving (Instrumental Version)" – 3:40

12" vinyl (Virgin VS900-12)

1. "I Need Your Loving (Extended Version)" – 7:12
2. "I Need Your Loving (Acapella Version)" – 3:40
3. "I Need Your Loving (Dub Version)" – 6:40
4. "I Need Your Loving (Instrumental Version)" – 3:40

== Charts ==
Chart (1987)	Peak position
U.K. Singles Chart	72
U.S. Billboard Hot 100	44
U.S. Cashbox Top 100	40
U.S. Hot Black Singles	52
