= This Thing Called Love =

This Thing Called Love may refer to:

- This Thing Called Love, a 1929 play by Edwin J. Burke
- This Thing Called Love (1929 film), a romantic comedy based on the play
- This Thing Called Love (1940 film), also based on the play
- This Thing Called Love (album), a 1959 album by Tommy Sands
- This Thing Called Love: The Greatest Hits of Alexander O'Neal, a 1992 album by Alexander O'Neal
- "This Thing Called Love", a song by Stephen Sanchez from Angel Face
- The Thing Called Love, a 1993 American comedy-drama film

== See also ==
- "What Is This Thing Called Love?", a 1929 Cole Porter song
- "What Is This Thing Called Love?" (short story), a 1961 Isaac Asimov story
- "What Is This Thing Called Love?" (Alexander O'Neal song), a 1991 song
