= All True Man =

Studio album by Alexander O'Neal
- Released: January 25, 1991
- Recorded: June – October 1990
- Studios: Flyte Tyme Studios, Edina, Minnesota; Starlight Sound, Richmond, California
- Genres: R&B; new jack swing; dance; soul
- Length: 64:10
- Label: Tabu
- Producers: Jimmy Jam and Terry Lewis; Foster & McElroy; Jellybean Johnson; Lance Alexander; prof. T

Alexander O'Neal chronology
My Gift to You (1988)	All True Man (1991)	Twelve Inch Mixes (1992)

Professional ratings
Review scores
Source	Rating
AllMusic	3/5 stars
Calgary Herald	B+
Chicago Tribune	3/4 stars
Entertainment Weekly	(favorable)
Melody Maker	(favorable)
People Magazine	(favorable)

All True Man is the fourth studio album by American recording artist Alexander O'Neal. The album was a success in the UK, peaking at number two, though sales did not reach the levels of his previous album, Hearsay.

On release, the album was received favorably by the majority of music critics. it went on to peak at number 49 on the Billboard 200 and reached #3 on Top R&B/Hip-Hop Albums. The album's title single reached number 5 on the R&B chart and number 43 on the pop chart. The album launched four charting singles in the UK. "All True Man" peaked at number 18 on the UK Singles Chart; "What Is This Thing Called Love?" peaked at #53; "Shame on Me" peaked at number 71; "Sentimental" at number 53. The album was certified gold by the RIAA in 1992. In the UK, it was also certified gold by the BPI.

== Critical reception ==
In a retrospective review, Alex Henderson of AllMusic gave the album three out of five stars and wrote that "The production is slick and high-tech; the vocals are the essence of earthy soulfulness. All True Man isn't O'Neal's best or most essential Tabu/Epic release; novices, in fact, would be better off starting out with his self-titled debut album of 1985." adding that "Nonetheless, this is a respectable, satisfying effort that the singer's hardcore fans will appreciate."

== Track listing ==
All tracks are written by James Harris and Terry Lewis, except where noted.

Side one
No.	Title	Writer(s)	Length
1.	"Time Is Running Out"		3:51
2.	"The Yoke (G.U.O.T.R.)"		7:15
3.	"Every Time I Get Up"	Lance Alexander; Tony Tolbert	5:16
4.	"Somebody (Changed Your Mind)"		5:00
5.	"Midnight Run"	Foster & McElroy	4:45
6.	"Used"	Jellybean Johnson; Lisa Keith; Stanley Howard	4:59

Side two
No.	Title	Writer(s)	Length
7.	"All True Man"		5:04
8.	"Sentimental"		6:15
9.	"What Is This Thing Called Love?"		6:04
10.	"The Morning After"		5:06
11.	"Hang On"	Alexander; Tolbert	6:29
12.	"Shame On Me"	Jam; Lewis; Howard	4:01

== Personnel ==
Credits are adapted from the album's liner notes.

"Time Is Running Out"

- Jimmy Jam - keyboards, synthesizer, drum programming, rhythm & vocal arrangements
- Terry Lewis - rhythm & vocal arrangements, backing vocals
- Lisa Keith - backing vocals

"The Yoke (G.U.O.T.R.)"

- Jimmy Jam - keyboards, synthesizer, drum programming, rhythm & vocal arrangements
- Terry Lewis - rhythm & vocal arrangements, backing vocals
- prof t. - rap, backing vocals
- Lisa Keith - backing vocals
- Joey Elias - backing vocals

"Every Time I Get Up"

- Lance Alexander - drum programming, sampling, keyboards, piano, rhythm & vocal arrangements, programming vocals, programming, sequencing, additional vocals
- prof. T. - vocal arrangements, backing vocals
- Terry Lewis - vocal arrangements, programming vocals, backing vocals, additional vocals
- Karyn White - backing vocals
- Andre Shepard - backing vocals
- Ann Nesby - backing vocals
- Marie Graham - backing vocals

"Somebody (Changed Your Mind)"

- Jimmy Jam - keyboards, synthesizer, drum programming, rhythm & vocal arrangements
- Terry Lewis - rhythm & vocal arrangements, backing vocals
- Karyn White - backing vocals
- Andre Shepard - backing vocals

"Midnight Run"

- Denzil Foster - keyboards, drum programming
- Thomas Elroy - keyboards, drum programming
- Maxine Jones - backing vocals
- Samuelle - backing vocals

"Used"

- Jellybean Johnson - all guitars, drums, synthesizer, rhythm & vocal arrangements
- Chance Howard - keyboards, synthesizer
- Jimmy Jam - keyboards
- Jim Demgen - computer programming
- Lisa Keith - vocal arrangements, backing vocals
- prof. t. - backing vocals

"All True Man"

- Jimmy Jam - keyboards, synthesizer, drum programming, rhythm & vocal arrangements
- Terry Lewis - percussion, rhythm & vocal arrangements, backing vocals
- Karyn White - backing vocals

"Sentimental"

- Jimmy Jam - acoustic piano, keyboards, synthesizer, drum programming, rhythm & vocal arrangements
- Terry Lewis - rhythm & vocal arrangements, backing vocals
- Lee Blaskey - string arrangements
- Susie Allard - strings
- Mynra Rian - strings
- Joanna Shelton - strings
- Carolyn Daws - strings
- Mary Bahr - strings
- Lea Foli - strings
- Julia Persilz - strings
- Hyacinthe Tlucek - strings
- Maricia Peck - strings
- Jeanne Ekhold - strings
- Luara Sewell - strings
- Rudolph Lekhter - strings
- Karyn White - backing vocals
- Lisa Keith - backing vocals

"What Is This Thing Called Love?"

- Jimmy Jam - acoustic piano, keyboards, synthesizer, drum programming, rhythm & vocal arrangements
- Terry Lewis - rhythm & vocal arrangements, backing vocals
- Lee Blaskey - string arrangements
- Susie Allard - strings
- Mynra Rian - strings
- Joanna Shelton - strings
- Carolyn Daws - strings
- Mary Bahr - strings
- Lea Foli - strings
- Julia Persilz - strings
- Hyacinthe Tlucek - strings
- Maricia Peck - strings
- Jeanne Ekhold - strings
- Luara Sewell - strings
- Rudolph Lekhter - strings
- Lisa Keith - backing vocals

"The Morning After"

- Jimmy Jam - keyboards, synthesizer, drum programming, rhythm & vocal arrangements
- Terry Lewis - rhythm & vocal arrangements
- Lisa Keith - backing vocals
- Troy Thomson - backing vocals

"Hang On"

- Lance Alexander - keyboards, drum programming, persuasion, rhythm & vocal arrangements, programming vocals, programming & sequencing
- Jesse Johnson - guitars
- Terry Lewis - programming vocals, programming & sequencing, backing vocals
- prof. t. - rhythm & vocal arrangements, programming vocals, programming & sequencing, backing vocals
- Karyn White - backing vocals

Shame On Me

- Chance Howard - keyboards
- Jimmy Jam - rhythm & vocal arrangements
- Terry Lewis - rhythm & vocal arrangements

== Charts ==
=== Weekly charts ===
Chart (1991)	Peak position
Australian Albums (ARIA)	108
Dutch Albums (Album Top 100)	26
European Albums (Music & Media)	10
German Albums (Offizielle Top 100)	36
Swedish Albums (Sverigetopplistan)	20
UK Albums (Official Charts)	2
US Billboard 200	49
US Top R&B/Hip-Hop Albums (Billboard)	3

=== Year-end charts ===
Chart (1991)	Position
US Top R&B/Hip-Hop Albums (Billboard)	23

== Certifications ==
Region	Certification	Certified units/sales
United Kingdom (BPI)	Gold	100,000^{^}
United States (RIAA)	Gold	500,000^{^}
^{^} Shipments figures based on certification alone.
