= What Can I Say =

What Can I Say may refer to:

- What Can I Say (Carrie Underwood song)
- What Can I Say (Dead by April song)
- "What Can I Say", a 1976 song by Boz Scaggs

== See also ==
- "(What Can I Say) To Make You Love Me", a song by Alexander O'Neal
