= My Gift to You (Alexander O'Neal album) =

Studio album by Alexander O'Neal
- Released: November 11, 1988
- Recorded: August 1987–August 1988
- Genre: Christmas; electronic; R&B; funk; soul
- Length: 42:28
- Label: Tabu
- Producer: Jimmy Jam; Terry Lewis; Foster & McElroy; Tom Cartwright; Steve Hodge; Lee Blaskey

Alexander O'Neal chronology
All Mixed Up (1987)	My Gift to You (1988)	All True Man (1991)

Professional ratings
Review scores
Source	Rating
AllMusic	3/5 stars

My Gift to You is the first and only Christmas album by American recording artist Alexander O'Neal, released on November 11, 1988, by Tabu Records.

On release, the album was received favorably by the majority of music critics. However, it was not very successful, peaking at No. 149 on the Billboard 200 and reached No. 54 on Top R&B/Hip-Hop Albums. The album only launched one charting single in the UK. "The Christmas Song"/"Thank You for a Good Year" which peaked at No. 30 on the UK Singles Chart.

== Critical reception ==
In a retrospective review, Jason Ankeny of AllMusic gave the album three out of five stars and wrote that "My Gift to You is plainly a product of its era, complete with thick synthesizers and programmed rhythms, and is best enjoyed by listeners still hoping Santa brings them acid-washed jeans and Members Only jackets regardless of the year in question."

== Track listing ==
All tracks are written by James Harris and Terry Lewis, except where noted.

Side one
No.	Title	Length
1.	"My Gift to You"	4:21
2.	"Sleigh Ride"	5:58
3.	"Our First Christmas"	5:33
4.	"Remember Why (It's Christmas)"	4:09

Side two
No.	Title	Writer(s)	Length
5.	"The Little Drummer Boy"	Harry Simeone; Katherine K. Davis; Henry Onorati	5:00
6.	"The Christmas Song (Chestnuts Roasting on an Open Fire)"	Robert Wells; Mel Tormé	3:16
7.	"This Christmas"	Donny Pitts; Nadine McKinnor	3:32
8.	"Winter Wonderland"	Felix Bernard; Dick Smith	3:16
9.	"Thank You for a Good Year"		6:07
10.	"Remember Why (It's Christmas) (Reprise)"		1:21
Total length:			42:28

== Personnel ==
- Alexander O'Neal – arranger; vocal arrangement; vocals
- Jimmy Jam – arranger; associate producer; choir arrangement; drums; executive producer; horns; keyboard programming; keyboards; percussion; piano; producer; rhythm; string arrangements
- Terry Lewis – arranger; associate producer; bass; choir arrangement; executive producer; guitar; horns; percussion; rhythm; string arrangements; backing vocals
- Thomas McElroy – drum programming; drums; keyboards; producer
- Denzil Foster – drum programming; keyboards
- Jellybean Johnson – guitar; percussion
- David Agent – guitar
- Ira D. Conley – bass; bass (vocal)
- Lee Blaskey – arranger; conductor; orchestra production
- Michael L. Bowens – saxophone (tenor); tenor (vocal)
- Robert Edwards – saxophone (tenor); tenor (vocal)
- Terrence Frierson – saxophone (tenor); tenor (vocal)
- Dorothy Cates – soprano (vocal)
- Shirley Marie Graham – alto; alto (vocals)
- Carrie M. Harrington – alto; alto (vocals)
- Gary Hines – choir arrangement; director
- Wendy Ingram – soprano; soprano (vocal)
- Valerie Johnson – soprano; soprano (vocal)
- Lisa Keith – arranger; vocal arrangement; backing vocals
- Jennifer L. – alto (vocals)
- Patricia Lacy – alto (vocals)
- Renee McCall – soprano; soprano (vocal)
- Otis Montgomery – saxophone (tenor); tenor (vocal)
- Jayn Bell Porter – soprano; soprano (vocal)
- Randy Ran – backing vocals
- Charles Robinson – bass; bass (vocal)
- Alecia Russell – alto
- Aleeta D. Russell – alto (vocals)
- Sounds of Blackness – choir; chorus
- Jennifer Whitlock – alto; alto (vocals)
- David B. Young – bass; bass (vocal)

== Charts ==
Chart performance for My Gift to You
Chart (1988)	Peak position
Dutch Albums (Album Top 100)	92
Swedish Albums (Sverigetopplistan)	26
UK Albums (OCC)	53
US Billboard 200	149
US Top R&B/Hip-Hop Albums (Billboard)	54
