= Alex Loves... =

Studio album by Alexander O'Neal
- Released: January 28, 2008
- Recorded: June–October 2007
- Studio: Greystoke
- Genre: Contemporary R&B
- Length: 1:01:24
- Label: EMI
- Producer: Leigh Guest; Nat Augustin; Andy Whitmore; Nigel Lowis

Alexander O'Neal chronology
Live at the Hammersmith Apollo - London (2005)	Alex Loves... (2008)	Five Questions: The New Journey (2010)

Professional ratings
Review scores
Source	Rating
AllMusic	2.5/5 stars

Alex Loves... is the eighth studio album by American recording artist Alexander O'Neal. It was originally released in January 2008, on the label EMI as the follow-up to his 2002 album Saga of a Married Man. The album is considered to be a departure from O'Neal's sound, because it consists of cover versions mainly of standard R&B songs, with the exception of the last song "We're On Our Way", which was co-written by O'Neal.

The album was received negatively by the majority of music critics, while other reviewers noted good points to the album. The album peaked at #49 in the UK, and was his first charting album of new material for 6 years.

== Critical reception ==
In a retrospective review, Sharon Mawer of AllMusic gave the album two and a half out of five stars (his poorest star rating) and wrote that "the choice of songs on Alex Loves was rather a strange mixture and most simply didn't work" also adding that "Not an album to recommend except to the die-hard fans who kept his name alive while he was away."

== Track listing ==
No.	Title	Writer(s)	Length
1.	"Secret Lovers" (Atlantic Starr cover from the album As the Band Turns)	David Lewis; Wayne Lewis	4:28
2.	"A Million Love Songs" (Take That cover from the album Take That & Party)	Gary Barlow	3:24
3.	"Right Here Waiting" (Richard Marx cover from the album Repeat Offender)	Richard Marx	4:06
4.	"Unbreak My Heart" (Toni Braxton cover from the album Secrets)	Diane Warren	4:28
5.	"Your Song" (Elton John cover from the album Elton John)	Elton John; Bernie Taupin	4:01
6.	"Saturday Love" (Remake; originally on the Cherrelle album High Priority)	Jimmy Jam; Terry Lewis	5:01
7.	"If You Were Here Tonight" (Remake; originally on the album Alexander O'Neal)	Monte Moir	5:02
8.	"What You Won't Do For Love" (Bobby Caldwell cover from the album Bobby Caldwell)	Bobby Caldwell; Alfons Kettner	3:46
9.	"When a Man Loves a Woman" (Percy Sledge cover from the album When a Man Loves a Woman)	Calvin Lewis; Andrew Wright	3:03
10.	"Babe" (Styx cover from the album Cornerstone)	Dennis DeYoung	3:57
11.	"Always & Forever" (Heatwave cover from the album Too Hot to Handle)	Rod Temperton	4:38
12.	"You're My First, My Last, My Everything" (Barry White cover from the album Can't Get Enough)	Peter Radcliffe; Tony Sepe; Barry White	4:01
13.	"Cherish" (Kool & the Gang cover from the album Emergency)	Robert Bell; Ronald Bell; James Bonnefond; George Brown; Charles Smith; James Taylor; Curtis Williams	4:02
14.	"I'll Make Love to You" (Boyz II Men cover from the album II)	Babyface	3:27
15.	"We're On Our Way"	Nat Augustin; Alexander O'Neal; Carlton White	4:00
Total length:			1:01:24

== Personnel ==
Credits are adapted from the album's liner notes.

"Secret Lovers"

- Nat Augustin – guitars; keyboards; programming; backing vocals
- Leigh Guest – keyboards; programming
- Mica Paris – backing vocals
- Fay Jones – backing vocals

"A Million Love Songs"

- Andy Whitmore – guitars; keyboards; programming
- Leigh Guest – keyboards; programming
- Nat Augustin – backing vocals

"Right Here Waiting"

- Edward Stewart – guitars
- Andy Whitmore – keyboards; programming
- Leigh Guest – keyboards; programming

"Unbreak My Heart"

- Edward Stewart – guitars
- Andy Whitmore – keyboards; programming
- Leigh Guest – keyboards; programming
- James Davies – trumpet
- Angelo Starr – backing vocals
- Nat Augustin – backing vocals
- Fay Jones – backing vocals

"Your Song"

- Edward Stewart – guitars
- Richard Denapoli – live drums
- Andy Whitmore – keyboards; programming
- Leigh Guest – keyboards; programming

"Saturday Love"

- Bianca Lindgren – guest vocals; backing vocals
- Edward Stewart – guitars
- Andy Whitmore – keyboards; programming
- Leigh Guest – keyboards; programming
- Nat Augustin – backing vocals
- Angelo Starr – backing vocals

"If You Were Here Tonight"

- Nat Augustin – guitars; keyboards; programming; backing vocals
- Leigh Guest – keyboards; programming
- Ann Augustin – backing vocals

"What You Won't Do For Love"

- Nat Augustin – keyboards; programming; trombone; backing vocals
- Leigh Guest – keyboards; programming
- James Davies – trumpet
- Fay Jones – backing vocals
- Angelo Starr – backing vocals

"When a Man Loves a Woman"

- Andy Whitmore – guitars; keyboards; programming
- Edward Stewart – guitars
- Richard Denapoli – live drums
- Pat Byrne – bass guitar
- Leigh Guest – keyboards; programming
- James Davies – trumpet
- Nat Augustin – backing vocals

"Babe"

- Andy Whitmore – guitars; keyboards; programming
- Richard Denapoli – live drums
- Leigh Guest – keyboards; programming
- Angelo Starr – backing vocals
- Nat Augustin – backing vocals
- Fay Jones – backing vocals

"Always & Forever"

- Nat Augustin – guitars; keyboards; programming; backing vocals
- Richard Denapoli – live drums
- Leigh Guest – keyboards; programming
- Ann Augustin – backing vocals

"You're the First, the Last, My Everything"

- Nat Augustin – guitars; backing vocals
- Edward Stewart – guitars
- Richard Denapoli – live drums
- Pat Byrne – bass guitar
- Leigh Guest – keyboards; programming
- Andy Whitmore – keyboards; programming
- James Davies – trumpet
- Fay Jones – backing vocals

"Cherish"

- Leigh Guest – keyboards; programming
- Andy Whitmore – keyboards; programming
- Angelo Starr – backing vocals
- Nat Augustin – backing vocals

"I'll Make Love to You"

- Nigel Lowis – keyboards; programming; string arrangements
- Leigh Guest – keyboards; programming
- Angelo Starr – backing vocals
- Nat Augustin – backing vocals

"We're On Our Way"

- Nat Augustin – guitars; keyboards; programming; backing vocals

== Charts ==
Chart performance for Alex Loves...
Chart (2008)	Peak position
UK Albums (OCC)	49
UK R&B Albums (OCC)	12
