= Five Questions: The New Journey =

Studio album by Alexander O'Neal
- Released: October 4, 2010
- Recorded: January 2009-March 2010
- Studio: Various: Greystoke Studios; Caspers Place; Jaydon Studios; Backstage at Northampton; Premises Studios; Winterland Studios
- Genre: Contemporary R&B
- Length: 48:30
- Label: CC Entertainment
- Producers: Alexander O'Neal, Billy Osborne

Alexander O'Neal chronology
Alex Loves... (2008)	Five Questions: The New Journey (2010)	Icon (2011)

Five Questions: The New Journey is the ninth and final studio album by American recording artist Alexander O'Neal. O'Neal co-produced the album, and was credited as co-writer on the tracks, "I Found True Love", "You Make Me Smile", "Love Don't Love Nobody", "It's Your Night Tonight", and "5 Questions".

== Track listing ==
1. "My House" (Noah Hickman) - 4:13
2. "I'm Back" (Hickman) - 2:47
3. "Minnesota Shuffle" (Hickman) - 3:53
4. "I Found True Love" (Billy Osborne, Toby Baker, Alexander O'Neal, Hickman) - 4:59
5. "I Can't Wait" (Al "Bossman" Demmings) - 4:01
6. "You Make Me Smile" (O'Neal, Kenny Wellington, Baker, Osborne) - 6:16
7. "Love Don't Love Nobody" (O'Neal, Mark Walker, Osborne, Gee Morris) - 4:26
8. "It's Your Night Tonight" (Baker, Osborne, O'Neal) - 4:11
9. "Love Won't Let Me Wait" (Bobby Eli, Vinnie Barrett) - 5:50
10. "5 Questions" (O'Neal, Morris, Osborne, Roland Hator, Eaaron Quacoe (Hator) - 4:40
11. "First Time" (Hickman) - 3:16

== Personnel ==
Credits are adapted from the album's liner notes.

"My House"

- Noah Hickman（ja:ノア・ヒックマン） - writer
- Beggar & Co. - horns

"I'm Back"

- Noah Hickman（ja:ノア・ヒックマン ）- writer
- Beggar & Co. - horns

"Minnesota Shuffle"

- Noah Hickman（ja:ノア・ヒックマン ）- writer
- Beggar & Co. - horns

"I Found True Love"

- Toby Baker - guitars, bass guitar, keyboards
- Billy Osborne - drums, percussion programming
- Gee Morris - backing vocals
- Alexander O'Neal - backing vocals

"I Can't Wait"

- Kevin Briggs - guitars
- Billy Osborne - drums, percussion programming
- Andy Whitmore - bass guitar
- Oli Langford - viola
- Tom Piggot-Smith - violin
- Oli Lewis - violin
- Danny Keane - cello
- Fenitrieus Thomas - backing vocals

"You Make Me Smile"

- Toby Baker - keyboards
- Kenny Wellington - trumpet
- Billy Osborne - percussion
- Gee Morris - backing vocals
- Alexander O'Neal - backing vocals

"Love Don't Love Nobody"

- Billy Osborne - drums, percussion programming
- Mark Walker - keyboards
- Oli Langford - violin
- Oli Lewis - violin
- Rustom Pomeroy - viola
- Danny Keane - cello
- Gee Morris - backing vocals
- Alexander O'Neal - backing vocals

"It's Your Night Tonight"

- Toby Baker - guitars, keyboards
- Billy Osborne - drums, percussion programming
- David Baptiste - saxophone
- Beggar & Co. - horns
- Kenny Wellington - trumpet
- Harry Brown - trombone
- Gee Morris - backing vocals
- Alexander O'Neal - backing vocals

"Love Won't Let Me Wait"

- Kevin Briggs - guitars
- Billy Osborne - drums, percussion programming
- Otto Williams - bass guitar
- Toby Baker - keyboards
- Andy Whitmore - strings
- Faye Jones - backing vocals
- Gee Morris - backing vocals
- Alexander O'Neal - backing vocals

"5 Questions"

- Oli Langford - viola, violin
- Tom Piggot-Smith - violin
- Oli Lewis - violin
- Danny Keane - cello
- Gee Morris - backing vocals
- Alexander O'Neal - backing vocals
- Eaaron Quacoe(Hator)and Roland Hator - music composers

"First Time"

- Noah Hickman - writer

== Charts ==
Chart	Peak position
UK Albums Chart	72
