= Lovers Again (album) =

Studio album by Alexander O'Neal
- Released: September 1996
- Recorded: February–June 1996
- Studio: Obsessions recording studios, Los Angeles, California
- Genre: R&B; funk; soul
- Producer: B-Cube (Ben Obi); Dr. Pelè Kazir; Dennis Charles; Ronnie Wilson; Nick Mundy; Billy Osborne; Toby Baker

Alexander O'Neal chronology
The Best of Alexander O'Neal (1995)	Lovers Again (1996)	Saga of a Married Man (2002)

Professional ratings
Review scores
Source	Rating
AllMusic	3/5 stars
The Guardian	2/5 stars

Lovers Again is the sixth studio album by American recording artist Alexander O'Neal.

== Track listing ==
1. "Do You Right" - 4:24
2. "Let's Get Together" - 4:26
3. "Lovers Again" - 3:31
4. "Can You Stand the Rain" - 4:23
5. "Baby Come to Me" - 4:01
6. "No One But You" - 4:42
7. "Body Talkin'" - 4:24
8. "More Than My Heart" - 4:08
9. "Sleepin'" - 4:27
10. "Carry On" - 5:04
11. "Sneakin'" - 5:23
12. "Our Love" - 4:07
13. "Grind" - 4:54
14. "If We Get It On" - 4:15 (Japan only)
15. "Cry" - 4:42 (Japan only)

Note: on the Japan release "Baby Come to Me" is a remixed version

== Personnel ==
Credits are adapted from the album's liner notes.

"Do You Right"

- Written by: Dr. Pelè Kazir
- John Strawberry Fields - guitar sample
- Backing vocals - Dr. Pelè Kazir, Marvin Gunn, Bruce DeShazer, Alexander O'Neal

"Let's Get Together"

- Written by: Dr. Pelè Kazir
- David Eiland - saxophone
- Mike Scott - guitars
- Backing vocals - Dr. Pelè Kazir, Marvin Gunn, Bruce DeShazer [KoKo-Blak], Trianita

"Lovers Again"

- Written by: B-Cube (Ben Obi) and Dr. Pelè Kazir
- David Eiland - saxophone
- backing vocals - Dr. Pelè Kazir, Marvin Gunn, Reggie Wilson, Alexander O'Neal

"Can You Stand the Rain"

- Written by: Dr. Pelè Kazir
- David Eiland - saxophone
- Derek Russell - bass guitar
- Backing vocals - Dr. Pelè Kazir, Marvin Gunn, Bruce DeShazer [KoKo-Blak]

"Baby Come to Me"

- Milton McDonald - guitars
- David Phillips - additional keyboards
- Paul Meeham - programming
- Sam Noel - programming, technician
- Backing vocals - Beverly Skeete, Weston Forster

"No One But You"

- Written by: Dr. Pelè Kazir
- B-Cube (Ben Obi) - additional keyboards, drum programming
- Backing vocals - Tammy, Tisha, Davidra [Ashanti]

"Body Talking"

- Written by: Dr. Pelè Kazir
- B-Cube (Ben Obi) - additional programming
- David Gonzalez - bass sample
- Mike Scott - guitar sample
- Backing vocals - Dr. Pelè Kazir, Alexander O'Neal

"More Than My Heart"

- Prince Sampson - guitars
- Kevin Robinson - brass
- Fayyaz Virji - brass
- Bud Beadle - brass
- Paul Meehan - programming
- Sam Noel - technician
- Backing vocals - Weston forster, Beverly Skeete

"Sleepin'"

- Prince Sampson - guitars
- Chris Offen - guitars
- David Phillips - additional keyboards
- Harry Morgan - percussion
- Paul Meehan - programming
- Sam Noel - programming, technician

"Carry On"

- Prince Sampson - guitars
- David Phillips - organ
- Kevin Robinson - brass
- Fayyaz Virji - brass
- Bud Beadle - brass
- Paul Meehan - programming
- Sam Noel - technician
- Backing vocals - Weston Forster, Beverly Skeete, Marcia Escoffery, Robert Thompson

"Sneakin'"

- Nick Mundy - programming, backing vocals

"Our Love"

- Toby Baker - keyboards, synthesizers
- Billy Osbourne - drum programming, percussion
- Paul Stoner - synclavier programming
- Backing vocals and arrangements - Gee Morris, Alexander O'Neal

"Grind"

- Nick Mundy - programming
- Hazel Fernandes - additional lead vocals
- Errol Reid - rap sample
- Backing vocals - D. Harvey, Nick Mundy

== Charts ==
Chart	Peak position
Top R&B/Hip-Hop Albums	60
UK Album Chart	119
German Album Chart	63

== Release history ==
Label	Cat. No.		Format	Date
EMI Premier	7243 8 54683	UK	CD, Cassette	1996
Victor	VICP-60056	JP	CD	1996
Groove Society	SPV 085-33802	DE	CD	1997
Ichiban Records	ICH1512-2	US	CD	1998
