= Flyte Tyme =

US musical group

Background information
- Origin: Minneapolis, Minnesota, United States
- Genres: Funk; rock; pop
- Years active: 1973–1981
- Past members: David Eiland; Jimmy "Jam" Harris; Anton (Tony) Johnson; Cynthia Johnson; Jellybean Johnson; Terry Lewis; Monte Moir; Alexander O'Neal; Jimmie L. Anderson; Tom Lund

Flyte Tyme was a funk band from Minneapolis that launched the careers of vocalists Cynthia Johnson, Alexander O'Neal and producers Jimmy Jam and Terry Lewis. Many of the group's musicians would later work with Prince. The band's name is a sensational spelling of the phrase "flight time."

== History ==
Flyte Tyme began as a Minneapolis funk/R&B unit, taking its name from "Flight Time", a 1973 Donald Byrd song. The group was first known as Wars of Armageddon, then Soul Vaccination, before becoming Flyte Tyme. The spelling of the name was later changed to Flyte Tyme.

The band's members varied throughout the group's history: founder David Eiland on saxophone, Cynthia Johnson on lead vocals and saxophone, Jimmie L. Anderson on saxophone, Garry "Jellybean" Johnson on drums, Tony Johnson on lead guitar, Monte Moir and Jimmy "Jam" Harris on keyboards, and Terry Lewis on bass.

After Cynthia Johnson's departure, Alexander O'Neal was her replacement. Johnson later gained fame as the voice of Lipps Inc.'s worldwide No. 1 song "Funkytown" and O'Neal later enjoyed a solo career with songs and production by Jam & Lewis.

In 1981, Flyte Tyme became the Time when Prince added two members of another local group, Enterprise, to the act; his childhood friend and drummer Morris Day and guitarist Jesse Johnson. Day became the group's frontman, replacing O'Neal.

Jam & Lewis left the Time in 1983 to pursue an independent writing and producing career, resurrecting the Flyte Tyme name for their production company and later, their second record label.

== Discography ==
Two unreleased songs, "I Got You on My Mind" and "It's the Things That You Do", were released in 2013 on the Purple Snow: Forecasting the Minneapolis Sound compilation.
