= Saga of a Married Man =

Studio album by Alexander O'Neal
- Released: February 8, 2002
- Recorded: July–November 2001
- Studio: Various: Echo Bay Studios; Hear, Inc.
- Genres: R&B; hip hop; funk; soul
- Length: 40:20
- Label: Eagle
- Producers: Bobby Z.; Brian Steckler; Michael "Smidi" Smith; French Spencer; J. Isaac Moore; Ian Boxill; Jean Bellefeuille

Alexander O'Neal chronology
Lovers Again (1996)	Saga of a Married Man (2002)	Greatest Hits (2004)

Professional ratings
Review scores
Source	Rating
AllMusic	(Not Rated)

Saga of a Married Man is the seventh studio album by American recording artist Alexander O'Neal. It was originally released in early 2002 by Eagle as the follow-up to the 1996 album Lovers Again. Recording sessions took place at Echo Bay Studios and Hear, Inc. assisted by former Prince drummer, Bobby Z. O'Neal was credited as co-writer on the track "Married Man".

The album was received negatively by the majority of music critics, while other reviewers noted good points to the album. The album went largely unnoticed by the public, being a commercial disappointment, which marked the beginning of a downturn in O'Neal's fortunes on the album charts.

== Track listing ==
No.	Title	Writer(s)	Producer(s	Length
1.	"He Said She Said"	Brian Steckler; Clark Gorder; Greg Wood; Michael Smith	Bobby Z.; Brian Steckler; Michael "Smidi" Smith	2:56
2.	"You're Gonna Miss Me"	Demetrius Spencer; Trey Lorenz	Bobby Z; French Spencer	3:43
3.	"I'm There"	Bobby Z.; J. Isaac Moore	Bobby Z.; J. Isaac Moore	3:58
4.	"My Baby's Gone"	Jason Peterson DeLaire	Bobby Z.; Moore	5:07
5.	"It Don't Matter"	Deeyon Dobson; Ian Boxill; Jean Bellefeuille; Tony Grant	Bobby Z.; Moore	3:53
6.	"It's OK"	Moore	Bobby Z.; Moore	3:59
7.	"What You See Is What You Get"	Scott LeGere		0:22
8.	"Married Man"	Alexander O'Neal, Moore, Segidi	Bobby Z.; Moore	4:02
9.	"What Is A Man?"	Moore	Bobby Z.; Moore	3:59
10.	"Last Night"	Gromyko Collins; Ivan Johnson	Bobby Z.; Moore	4:11
11.	"Happy Home"	Moore	Bobby Z.; Moore	4:10
Total length:				40:20

== Personnel ==
Credits are adapted from the album's liner notes.

"He Said She Said"

- Danny Donnelly - guitars
- Brian Steckler - programming, backing vocals
- Greg Wood - backing vocals

"You're Gonna Miss Me"

- Mike Scott - guitars
- French - programming
- VoiceMale - additional backing vocals

"I'm There"

- Mike Scott - guitars
- Bobby Z. - drum programming
- J. Isaac Moore - programming, backing vocals

"My Baby's Gone"

- Mike Scott - guitars
- J. Isaac Moore - programming
- Jeretta Steele - backing vocals

"It's OK"

- Mike Scott - guitars
- J. Isaac Moore - programming, backing vocals

"What You See Is What You Get"

- Alexander O'Neal - performing
- Cynthia Kampa - performing
- Scott LeGere - piano

"Married Man"

- Mike Scott - guitars
- J. Isaac Moore - programming, backing vocals

"What Is A Man?"

- Mike Scott - guitars
- J. Isaac Moore - programming, backing vocals

"Last Night"

- Mike Scott - guitars
- J. Isaac Moore - programming
- VoiceMale - backing vocals

"Happy Home"

- Mike Scott - guitars
- J. Isaac Moore - programming, backing vocals

== Charts ==
Chart performance for Saga of a Married Man
Chart (2002)	Peak position
UK R&B Albums (Official Charts)	24

== Release history ==
Label	Cat. No.		Format	Date
Eagle	ER 20025-2	^{US}	CD	2002
Eagle	EAGCD180, GAS 0000180 EAG, EDL EAG 392 - 2	^{GER}	CD	2002
Eagle	EDL EAG 392-2	^{?}	CD	2002
