= The Lovers (Alexander O'Neal song) =

Single by Alexander O'Neal

from the album Hearsay
- Released: 1988
- Recorded: 1986
- Genre: R&B
- Length: 4:38 (album version)
- Label: Tabu
- Songwriter: Jimmy Jam and Terry Lewis
- Producer: Jimmy Jam & Terry Lewis

Alexander O'Neal singles chronology
"Never Knew Love Like This" (1988)	"The Lovers" (1988)	"(What Can I Say) To Make You Love Me" (1988)

"The Lovers" is a song written by Jimmy Jam and Terry Lewis and recorded by American recording artist Alexander O'Neal. It is the fourth single from O'Neal's second solo studio album, Hearsay (1987). The song's distinctive backing vocals were performed by Cherrelle and Lisa Keith. Following the successful chart performances of the Hearsay singles "Fake", "Criticize", and "Never Knew Love Like This", "The Lovers" was released as the album's fourth single.

== Release ==
Alexander O'Neal's 10th hit single and it reached #28 in the UK Singles Chart. In the United States, the single reached #41 on Billboard's Hot R&B/Hip-Hop Singles & Tracks.

== Track listing and formats ==
- US 12" Vinyl (Special 12" Mixes)

A1 "The Lovers (Extended Version)" – 7:02
A2 "The Lovers (A Cappella)" – 5:16
B1 "The Lovers (Radio Edit)" – 5:16
B2 "The Lovers (Instrumental)" – 7:02

- UK 7" Vinyl single

A "The Lovers" – 3:50
B "The Lovers (Instrumental)" – 3:50

- Europe CD maxi single
1. "The Lovers (Extended Version)" – 7:02
2. "The Lovers (Bonus Beats)" – 5:00
3. "The Lovers (Instrumental)" – 7:02

== Personnel ==
Credits are adapted from the album's liner notes.

- Alexander O'Neal – lead vocals
- Jimmy Jam – drum and keyboard programming, keyboards, percussion, handclaps
- Terry Lewis – percussion, backing vocals
- Steve Hodge – percussion
- Cherrelle, Randy Ran, Lisa Keith – backing vocals
- Jellybean Johnson, James 'Popeye' Greer, Kelli Anderson – handclaps

== Charts ==
Chart performance for "The Lovers"
Chart (1988)	Peak position
UK Singles Chart	28
US Hot R&B/Hip-Hop Songs	41
