= Hearsay (album) =

Studio album by Alexander O'Neal
- Released: July 29, 1987
- Recorded: September 1986 – January 1987
- Studios: Flyte Time Productions, Inc. Studio A & B (Minneapolis, Minnesota)
- Genres: Electronic; R&B; funk; soul; pop soul; disco; new jack swing
- Length: 41:32
- Labels: Tabu (Worldwide); Epic (Greece)
- Producer: Jimmy Jam and Terry Lewis

Alexander O'Neal chronology
Alexander O'Neal (1985)	Hearsay (1987)	All Mixed Up (1988)

Singles from Hearsay
- 1. "Fake" Released: May 5, 1987; 2. "Criticize" Released: September 23, 1987; 3. "Never Knew Love Like This" Released: January 5, 1988; 4. "The Lovers" Released: May 3, 1988; 5. "(What Can I Say) To Make You Love Me" Released: July 1988; 6. "Hearsay '89" Released: February 1989; 7. "Sunshine" Released: August 1, 1989

Hearsay is the second solo studio album by American recording artist Alexander O'Neal. It was released on July 29, 1987 by Tabu and Epic as the follow-up to O'Neal's critically and commercially successful studio album Alexander O'Neal (1985). Hearsay explores similar genres to those of Alexander O'Neal including pop, R&B, soul, post-disco, funk, and adult contemporary music, while also incorporating a newer genre, new jack swing. The songs were recorded from 1986 to 1987 in sessions that took place at Flyte Time Productions, Inc. Studio A & B in Minneapolis, Minnesota, assisted by R&B songwriting and record production team Jimmy Jam and Terry Lewis. It features contributions from guest musicians, including Cherrelle, David Eiland, and Lisa Keith, and is generally regarded as the culmination of the smoother, more adult-oriented sound of O'Neal's early work.

On release, the album was received favourably by the majority of music critics. O'Neal's most commercially successful solo album, in the United States it went on to peak at number 29 on the Billboard 200 and number two on Top R&B/Hip-Hop Albums. The album was even more successful in the United Kingdom, peaking at number four and producing seven charting singles, including five top 40 hits. "Fake" peaked at number 33 on the UK Singles Chart; "Criticize" peaked at number four; "Never Knew Love Like This" at number 26; "The Lovers" at number 28; "(What Can I Say) To Make You Love Me" at number 27; "Sunshine" at number 72. Several remixes of the album's songs also charted: "Fake '88", (No. 16); "Hearsay '89", (No. 56). Two of the tracks, "Fake" and "Criticize", were also popular anthems in UK dance clubs. The album went on to be certified gold by the RIAA on October 20, 1987. In the UK, it sold more than 900,000 copies, being certified 3× Platinum by the BPI.

The album was re-released on 6 May 2013 on Tabu's new Re-born imprint featuring rare bonus content. The reissue is a 2-CD set with the original album digitally remastered from the original 1/2" mix tapes; the bonus content consists of associated 7" and 12" mixes.

== Composition ==
Hearsay is a concept album, based around the attendees of a house soirée being hosted by O'Neal. Over the course of the album, the themes that are played out include O'Neal's advances towards a particular woman in the room ("What Can I Say to Make You Love Me"), as well as his observations on other attendees of the party – for instance a courting couple ("The Lovers"), a spiteful gossip-monger ("Hearsay"), a loudmouth – implied to be a groupie ("Fake"), and a nagging ex-lover ("Criticize"), unrequited admiration ("Crying Overtime"), and culminating in the finale ("When the Party's Over"), where O'Neal finally persuades the woman to stay at the conclusion of the soirée. Interspersed between the tracks are "interludes" consisting of general background noise and conversation between the partygoers which sets up the theme of the next song. One reviewer described these as segments as "gossip, accusations and confrontations flowing between songs."

The album's first side contains the uptempo dance tracks while the second side is slower and more romantic. The production focuses on computerised sounds that, according to one reviewer, "speak for themselves" without closely imitating "real" bass or guitar, resulting in a straight "techno-funk" style." Daryl Easlea described the music as "shiny, clunking machine-driven soul with strong melodies and a new take on traditional soul male supremacy." Jam and Lewis played the majority of the instruments and wrote all of the album's songs except for "Criticize", written by O'Neal with Jellybean Johnson.

"Fake" and "Criticize", described by writer Marcello Carlin as containing a "gargantuan futurist fury", have been called typical Jam and Lewis dance tracks. The former song, built around the "nasty bass" requested by O'Neal in the song's intro, uses the "driving dance beat" from Janet Jackson's "What Have You Done for Me Lately" (1986). "(What Can I Say) to Make You Love Me?" is another dance track, with a 14-second intro that Carlin described as foreshadowing the work of Boards of Canada, while "The Lovers" features O'Neal expressing his romantic side to "a propulsive backbeat...with headswaying keyboards." The chorus utilises a "trading-lines" style between four voices (Lewis, Cherrelle, Lisa Keith and Randy Ran) that has been compared to a church choir. "Never Knew Love Like This", which features shimmering synths, showcases the singer's "vast range, as he deals some breezy [George] Benson-like crooning", with wavering saxophone accompaniment. The song has drawn comparison to "Luther Vandross's smooth, accomplished rhythm and blues." Elsewhere, "Crying Overtime" and "Sunshine" are romantic ballads, while the title track is mid-tempo and melodic.

== Critical reception ==
Professional ratings
Review scores
Source	Rating
AllMusic	4.5/5 stars
Encyclopedia of Popular Music	4/5 stars
Lincoln Journal Star	4/5 stars
Record Mirror	3.5/5 stars
Rolling Stone	3.5/5 stars
The Village Voice	B+

Among contemporary reviews, Eric Snider of Tampa Bay Times described Jam and Lewis as the best contemporary producers in pop music because they "[use] machines to create real, soulful sounds", and deemed Hearsay to be full of "simple, snappy Jam/Lewis melodies, punchy dance grooves and a few lush ballads," with–despite the minimal guitar and saxophone work and absence of drums–a remarkable "level of soul", adding that the production "wants its beat-heavy techno-funk style taken at face". He concluded that the album is "an extremely good pop-soul record." A reviewer for Leader-Telegram said that while Jam and Lewis had already "turned the funk world on its ear", their "techno-sharp groove with uncharacteristic feel" often undermined their songwriting. However, they added that Hearsay avoids this fate because it matches the duo with "a truly gifted singer", writing that the album "is listenable off the dance floor as well as being a moving monster."

L. Kent Wolgamott of Lincoln Journal Star said that O'Neal's powerful singing recalls Vandross and has enough personality to make Hearsay "an O'Neal album rather than just another Jam-Lewis production", writing that he "owns the groove on the dance numbers and then is satin smooth and emotional on the ballads." Hugh Wyatt of Daily News described O'Neal as one of the smoothest R&B singers in over a decade, with "the potential to follow up in the footsteps of Sam Cooke, Marvin Gaye and Ted Pendergrass." Kevin Connal of The Boston Globe wrote that Hearsay continued Jam and Lewis' winning formula, deeming the duo to be "masterful technicians at making studio recordings come to life with popping vigor." In a review for Musician, J.D. Considine wrote that O'Neal "enlivens" the "album-within-a-party" gimmick by using its 'bite' as a springboard for further emotional context, and said that while the music exemplifies "the hottest production in R&B today", the album succeeds via "the way O'Neal's voice conveys both musical content and individual personality."

Tony Harrison of The Province wrote that Hearsay comprises Jam and Lewis' typical mix of "potent dance tracks" but with an "equally potent singer", describing O'Neal's vocals as "steamy and commanding, whether he is angry or pleading, and testify to why he is in the vanguard of the new soul balladeers." For The Village Voice, Robert Christgau wrote that the record takes longer to digest as home listening compared to in nightclubs, but praised O'Neal's "nasty guy" persona on "Fake" and "Criticize", adding that "unlike Jam & Lewis's nasty girl, O'Neal has the vocal muscle (and biceps) to back his nasty up." Anthony DeCurtis of Rolling Stone said that the album's "clean, propulsive electronic funk" is more interesting than its party concept, writing that "Hearsay may be a compilation of formulas, but these formulas have lost none of their freshness or impact." A reviewer for Uxbridge and Hillingdon Gazette was less favourable, writing that the album comprised "steady yet predictable disco" that, despite O'Neal's impressive delivery, lacks "any real identity". He qualified this by saying listeners seeking "a good groove" would enjoy the album.

=== Retrospective reviews ===
Among retrospective assessments, Ron Wynn of AllMusic wrote that Jam and Lewis provided "their finest and tightest production for any O'Neal record", adding that "the beats were catchy, the songs hook-laden, and O'Neal's voice alternately explosive, sensitive and bemused." Daryl Easlea of the BBC wrote that Hearsay was "[d]ismissed by the cognoscenti but adored by the masses." He deemed it O'Neal's best work and a filler-free record which, whilst "very much of its time", has not dated, adding: "It sounds as fresh now as it did then. Had it been 20 years earlier, Alexander O'Neal would have been compared to Otis Redding." In a piece on Jam and Lewis for Stylus Magazine, Marcello Carlin described the "epic" Hearsay as "Jam and Lewis' absolute masterpiece; sexual but nasty tirades blasting out over uncompromising avalanches of the unreal." He added that, as "a seamless marriage between old school and cold rationalist new," the album is equalled only by Son of Bazerk's Bazerk Bazerk Bazerk (1991), a record whose futuristic, "hot-blooded minimalism" he deemed unimaginable without Jam and Lewis' influence. Thomas Inkeep, also for Stylus Magazine, described Hearsay as "the finest R&B album of the '80s not made by Prince, a perfect marriage of songs, production, and singer."

== In popular culture ==
In 2008, "Criticize" appeared on Grand Theft Auto IV's fictional Soul/R&B radio station The Vibe 98.8. In 2017, "Fake" was used in Black Mirror's "San Junipero" episode, during the first scene at the night club Tucker's.

== Track listing ==
All tracks are written by James Harris and Terry Lewis, except where noted.

Side one
No.	Title	Writer(s)	Length
1.	"Intro"		0:35
2.	"(What Can I Say) To Make You Love Me"		4:25
3.	"Intro"		0:57
4.	"Hearsay"		4:01
5.	"Intro"		0:13
6.	"The Lovers"		4:38
7.	"Intro"		0:45
8.	"Fake"		3:56
9.	"Intro"		0:37
10.	"Criticize"	Garry Johnson; Alexander O'Neal	4:11

Side two
No.	Title	Length
11.	"Intro"	0:28
12.	"Never Knew Love Like This" (with Cherrelle)	5:09
13.	"Interlude"	0:17
14.	"Sunshine"	5:38
15.	"Interlude"	0:21
16.	"Crying Overtime"	5:13
17.	"Intro"	0:25
18.	"When the Party's Over"	3:32
Total length:		41:32

- On original CD pressings, the interlude before "Crying Overtime" was included as part of "Sunshine". It was restored as its own track for the 2013 reissue.
- A 2003 reissue resequenced the album so that all intros and interludes (except for those to "(What Can I Say) To Make You Love Me" and "Never Knew Love Like This") were made part of the track that directly followed them, yielding an 11 track album.

2013 reissue bonus disc
No.	Title	Length
1.	"Criticize" (Single Edit)	4:01
2.	"Criticize" (Critical Mix)	5:33
3.	"Criticize" (Critical Edit)	3:52
4.	"Criticize" (Nag Mix)	1:37
5.	"Fake" (Edit)	3:10
6.	"Fake" (Patty Mix)	3:14
7.	"Fake" (Instrumental)	4:41
8.	"Never Knew Love Like This" (Edit)	3:30
9.	"Sunshine" (Edit)	4:02
10.	"Hearsay '89"	3:40
11.	"The Lovers" (Bonus Beats)	5:00

== Personnel ==
Credits are adapted from the album's liner notes.

Musicians

- Alexander O'Neal – vocals; vocal and rhythm arrangements
- Jimmy Jam and Terry Lewis – percussion; keyboards; backing vocals; handclapping; producer; drum programming; keyboard programming; synthesizer programming, keyboard, synthesizer and percussion arrangements
- Jellybean Johnson – percussion; keyboards; background vocals; handclapping; drum programming; rhythm arrangements; keyboard programming; synthesizer programming on "Criticize"
- Cherrelle – arrangements, lead vocals and backing vocals on "Never Knew Love Like This"
- Spencer Bernard – programming; sequencing
- David Eiland – saxophone soloist on "Never Knew Love Like This"
- Steve Hodge – percussion on "The Lovers"; engineer
- Lisa Keith – backing vocals on "(What Can I Say) To Make You Love Me", "The Lovers" and "Criticize"; vocal arrangements on "Criticize"
- Randy Ran – backing vocals on "The Lovers", "Never Knew Love Like This", "Sunshine" and "When the Party's Over"
- Kelli Anderson – handclaps on "Hearsay" and "The Lovers"
- Jerome Benton – chants on "Fake"
- James Greer – handclapping on "The Lovers", chants on "Fake"
- Karen Williams, Cheryl Yvette Woodard, Delinda Miller, Trish A. Woods, Margie Abrahamson, Carra Wallace – party guests on interludes

Technical

- Clarence Avant – executive producer
- A. Scott Galloway – liner notes (2003 reissue)
- Brian Gardner – mastering
- Stafford – photography
- Dale Wehlacz – art direction, design

== Charts ==
=== Weekly charts ===
Chart (1987–89)	Peak position
Australian Albums (ARIA)	142
Austrian Albums (Ö3 Austria)	22
Dutch Albums (Album Top 100)	26
European Albums (Music & Media)	22
German Albums (Offizielle Top 100)	22
Italian Albums (Musica e dischi)	25
New Zealand Albums (RMNZ)	47
Norwegian Albums (VG-lista)	18
Swedish Albums (Sverigetopplistan)	13
UK Albums (Official Charts)	4
US Billboard 200	29
US Top R&B/Hip-Hop Albums (Billboard)	2

=== Year-end charts ===
Chart (1987)	Position
European Albums (Music & Media)	95
UK Albums (OCC)	47
US Top R&B/Hip-Hop Albums (Billboard)	47
Chart (1988)	Position
European Albums (Music & Media)	73
UK Albums (OCC)	22
US Top R&B/Hip-Hop Albums (Billboard)	23

== Certifications ==
Region	Certification	Certified units/sales
United Kingdom (BPI)	3× Platinum	900,000^{^}
United States (RIAA)	Gold	700,000
^{^} Shipments figures based on certification alone.

== Release history ==
Label	Cat. No.		Format	Date
Tabu	ZK 40320	^{US}	CD, Vinyl	1987
Tabu	TBU 450936 2	^{EU}	CD, Vinyl	1987
Tabu	CSCS 5113	^{JP}	CD	1990
Tabu, The Right Stuff	72435-43846-2-2	^{EU}	CD	2003
Solid	CDSOL-5206	^{JP}	CD	21 August 2013
Tabu	TABU 2005	^{UK}	CD	6 May 2013
