= All Mixed Up (Cougar Town) =

- Cougar Town episode
- Episode no.: Season 2 Episode 1
- Directed by: Bill Lawrence
- Written by: Bill Lawrence; Kevin Biegel
- Original air date: September 22, 2010

Guest appearances
- Jennifer Aniston as Glenn; Carolyn Hennesy as Barbara Coman; Spencer Locke as Kylie; Ryan Devlin as Smith Frank

Episode chronology
← Previous "Finding Out"	Next → "Let Yourself Go"
- Cougar Town season 2

"All Mixed Up" is the first episode of the second season of the American television sitcom Cougar Town. It originally aired on September 22, 2010, in the United States on ABC. In this episode, Jules (Courteney Cox) sees a therapist named Glenn (Jennifer Aniston) in order to relieve the stresses of her issues. Meanwhile, Bobby (Brian Van Holt) is troubled with the reality of Grayson's (Josh Hopkins) relationship with Jules, and Travis (Dan Byrd) prepares for college.

"All Mixed Up" was directed by co-creator Bill Lawrence and written by Lawrence and fellow co-creator Kevin Biegel. Aniston made a guest appearance in "All Mixed Up", after a year of heavy speculation. Lawrence felt that her appearance marked a transition in viewership opinions on the show, and opined that the series had precluded from its original concept.

The episode was well received by television commentators, who praised the storyline and Aniston's performance. Upon initial airing, it attained 8.35 million viewers and a 3.3/9 rating in the 18–49 demographic, according to Nielsen ratings. "All Mixed Up" became the third highest-rated episode of the series, and went on to become the highest-rated installment of the season.

== Plot ==
To help with the stresses of her various issues – understanding her new relationship with Grayson, dealing with Travis leaving for college, and trying to fit Bobby into her life – Jules (Courteney Cox) has started to see a new therapist, Glenn (Jennifer Aniston). Jules is able to relate well to Glenn, particularly because Glenn seems to have a mother-son bond with her son, Gabriel, as close as Jules has with Travis. Ellie (Christa Miller) is skeptical about Glenn's qualifications, and jealous that Jules now prefers to talk about her problems with Glenn instead of her.

Grayson (Josh Hopkins) decides that he wants to spend a day away from Jules for some space, sending Jules spiralling. She starts tracking down Glenn outside of therapy sessions to talk. Eventually, Jules discovers that Gabriel is not Glenn's son, but rather a pet dog; after the resulting argument, Glenn tells Jules to find another therapist. Jules then reverts to relying on Ellie for advice.

Andy (Ian Gomez) discovers that a photograph of Jules on an advertising bench has been defaced, so he, Bobby (Brian Van Holt) and Grayson stake out the bench to catch the culprit. Grayson quickly realises that Bobby defaced the bench; Bobby confides in Grayson that he's not entirely comfortably yet with Grayson's and Jules' relationship, but insists that their friendship is still close.

Laurie (Busy Philipps) bets Travis (Dan Byrd) twenty dollars that she can stay awake longer than him. Laurie cheats, taking naps at every possible opportunity, accepting that she will lose the bet, but enjoying the opportunity to mess with Travis. When the bet is over, they acknowledge how much they will miss each other when Travis leaves for college.

== Production ==
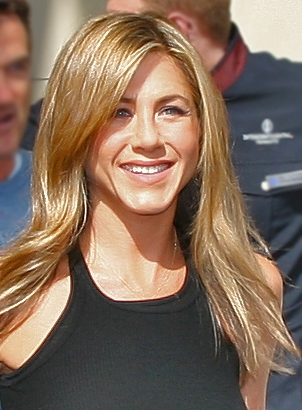
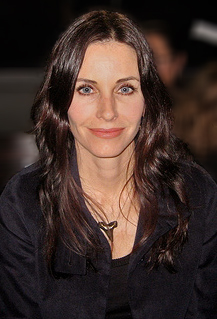
Aniston had previously worked with Cox in the sitcom Friends and again in the serial drama Dirt.

Actress Jennifer Aniston made a guest appearance on "All Mixed Up". Speculations of her appearance initially surfaced a year prior to the confirmation, and upon hearing of it, Cougar Town co-creator Bill Lawrence initially supported such allegations. Lawrence stated that he announced that Aniston would appear on the television series, but had not contacted her or her representatives. Eventually, Lawrence averted away from his claims and stated that "nothing's happened yet". He continued in his interview with E! Online: "I'd kill to get Jennifer on the show, and if I had any inclination it was happening, I would be telling everybody 'cause I don't really give a sh-t. I would love it to happen and the second it did I would tell everybody in the world, but nothing's happened."

Lawrence confirmed her appearance in July 2010 and revealed that Aniston attained the role of Bonnie, the psychiatrist for Jules. "Kind of a get-too-involved-in-her-life-type of therapist," he retorted. "Those guys are so close in real life they kind of do that for each other anyway. Bonnie has the life Jules wishes she has." Aniston had previously worked with Courteney Cox in the American sitcom Friends, and again on the serial drama Dirt. Aniston became the second cast member from Friends to appear on the television series, succeeding Lisa Kudrow, who previously appeared in the season one episode "Rhino Skin", also playing the role of a medical professional (specifically, a dermatologist).

We're very intentionally implying that it’s a therapist Courteney has been using for a while, and we’re certainly not going to make it like they’ll never see each other again. So I'm crossing my fingers that if she has a good time it'll happen again.

— Bill Lawrence

Cox wanted the show to establish itself before opting for an appearance by Aniston. Lawrence stated that it took a considerable length of time to lay on the foundation of Cougar Town; "And once we did and once it was clicking, I think that not only did Courteney feel comfortable talking to Jen about doing it, but comfortable in how funny she thinks the show is and that Jen would like it and fit into this world really well." He added: "It starts and ends with Courteney and Jennifer being really great friends and excited to work together again—especially doing comedy together. Every day that those two talk they have more ideas about [the role]. It's definitely something they’re both involved in creatively."

Bill Lawrence expressed that he hoped that Aniston's guest appearance would mark a turning point in viewership opinions, and felt that the show had distanced itself from its original concept. "I want as many people as I can get to see what the show kind of became last year," Lawrence articulated. "It went from a typical TV show trying to find itself to something that I’m really proud of and like and think is really funny."

== Reception ==
Jennifer Aniston guest-starred as a kooky, sage-burning life coach with anger-management issues and a dog that she treated like a child. She wasn't much like Rachel Green, but of course I can't help making that connection because hello, it's Courteney Cox and Jennifer Aniston in the same smoke-filled room. Their interactions were along the lines of what I imagine it would have been like if Rachel's character had suddenly decided she had become a wizard.

— Annie Barret
Entertainment Weekly

"All Mixed Up" was originally broadcast on September 22, 2010, in the United States on ABC. Upon airing, the episode garnered 8.35 million viewers, despite airing simultaneously with episodes of Hell's Kitchen on Fox, Criminal Minds on CBS, Law & Order: Special Victims Unit on NBC, and Hellcats on The CW. It attained a 3.3/9 rating amongst people the 18–49 demographic, according to Nielsen ratings. "All Mixed Up" achieved the series' highest total viewership in a year, and earned the highest rating in the 18–34 demographic of the night in its respective timeslot, garnering a 3.0/9 rating. The episode became the third-highest-rated episode of Cougar Town, as well as the highest-rated episode of its second season.

"All Mixed Up" was well received by television critics. Emily VanDerWerff of The A.V. Club issued the episode a B+ grade, and felt that the episode was superior to those of the show's first season. He asserted: "Cougar Town hasn't taken as big of a step up from season one to season two as it did from the first part of season one to the last part of season one. But the step from 'average' to 'good' was the easy part. Season two is the season where viewers are going to find out if the show has what it takes to make the small steps needed to get from 'good' to 'great'. There's every indication that it's on the way there in the premiere because it's finally started to wrestle with some of the knottier questions at its center." HitFix writer Alan Sepinwall opined that the show averted from its original premise; "It's become one of my favorite comedies, and whether you care about Aniston or not, tonight is a good time to sample it if you dismissed it last year because of the title, the original premise or some of those early episodes."

Commentators cited Jennifer Aniston's appearance as the highlight of the episode. Entertainment Weekly's Annie Barrett lauded the interactions between Aniston and Cox; "Their interactions were along the lines of what I imagine it would have been like if Rachel's character had suddenly decided she had become a wizard." Kevin Fallon of The Atlantic echoed synonymous thoughts, and felt that Aniston's performance reminded the audience of her star power. Fallon wrote: "Aniston's performance was delightfully weird and offbeat—and comedically sharp, a welcome change from the generic and bland film roles she's played in the years since Friends ended. Last night's performance spotlighted her gifts as a character actress—and served as a frustrating reminder of what we've been missing since she has [all but] abandoned that niche of acting." Sepinwall expressed that Aniston "acquits herself just fine in the small role of Jules' eccentric new therapist. She's likable and daffy but never over-the-top." Hollywood Life journalist Laura Schreffler was not as enthusiastic as the general consensus, avouching that Aniston's guest appearance was overhyped and a "glorified cameo". Schreffler added that Cox overshadowed her, asserting that she "is still way more hilarious".
