= Innocence (band) =

British R&B band

- Origin: London, England
- Genres: R&B; ambient; chill-out
- Years active: 1990–1992
- Label: Cooltempo/Chrysalis/EMI
- Past members: Gee Morris; Anna Jolley; Mark Jolley; Brian Harris

Innocence was a British R&B band fronted by Gee Morris that achieved some success in the UK in the early 1990s.

Masterminded by the production team of Anna Jolley, Mark Jolley and Brian Harris, Innocence's sound was similar to then-popular group Soul II Soul, but also added elements of downtempo and chill-out music. Signed to Cooltempo Records, the group's debut single, "Natural Thing", became their biggest UK hit in 1990, peaking at No. 16. The 12" version of the song featured the complete introduction and guitar solo by David Gilmour, from the Pink Floyd song, "Shine On You Crazy Diamond".

That same year they released their debut album, Belief, which was a Top 30 hit in the UK Albums Chart. The album spawned four further singles, all but one charting inside the UK Top 40. Belief was released in the US the following year, adding a cover version of "Riders on the Storm", originally by The Doors, which was not available in the UK edition. The album and its singles only found modest success in the US Billboard R&B chart.

In 1992, they released their second album, Build. Never released in the US, it was less successful than their debut, although two of its singles became Top 40 hits in the UK. They were "I'll Be There" (peaking at No. 26) and a cover version of a Diana Ross song "One Love In My Lifetime" (peaking at No. 40). After this album, the group disbanded. Gee Morris later released an unsuccessful self-titled solo album in 1994.

== Discography ==
=== Albums ===
List of albums, with selected chart positions
Title	Album details	Peak chart positions		
Title	Album details	UK	AUS	US R&B
Belief	Released: 1990; Format: LP, CS, CD; Label: Cooltempo / Reproduction	24	—	54
Build	Released: 1992; Format: LP, CS, CD; Label: Cooltempo	66	217	—

=== Singles ===
Year	Single	Peak positions						Album
Year	Single	UK	AUS	GER	NED	US R&B	US Dance	Album
1990	"Natural Thing"	16	116	14	30	—	27	Belief
1990	"Silent Voice"	37	—	38	—	—	—	Belief
1990	"Let's Push It"	25	153	37	—	39	21	Belief
1990	"A Matter of Fact"	37	175	57	—	—	—	Belief
1991	"Remember the Day"	56	187	—	—	—	—	Belief
1992	"I'll Be There"	26	174	—	—	—	—	Build
1992	"One Love In My Lifetime"	40	168	—	—	—	—	Build
1992	"Build"	72	161	—	—	—	—	Build
"—" denotes releases that did not chart or were not released.
