= All Mixed Up: Los Remixes =

Remix album by A.B. Quintanilla y Los Kumbia Kings
- Released: October 29, 2002
- Recorded: 1998–2002
- Genre: Cumbia
- Length: 45:10
- Label: EMI Latin
- Producers: A.B. Quintanilla III; Cruz Martínez

A.B. Quintanilla y Los Kumbia Kings chronology
Shhh! (2001)	All Mixed Up: Los Remixes (2002)	4 (2003)

Singles from All Mixed Up: Los Remixes
- 1. "La Cucaracha" Released: August 27, 2002

Professional ratings
Review scores
Source	Rating
AllMusic	2.5/5 stars

All Mixed Up: Los Remixes (English: All Mixed Up: The Remixes) is the first remix album and third album by Mexican-American cumbia group A.B. Quintanilla y Los Kumbia Kings and the first remix album by Mexican-American musician A.B. Quintanilla. It was released on October 29, 2002 by EMI Latin.

== Track listing ==
No.	Title	Writer(s)	Producer(s)	Length
1.	"La Cucaracha"	A.B. Quintanilla III, Cruz Martínez, Jason Cano, Nick "DJ Franz" Washington	Quintanilla III, Martínez	3:27
2.	"Reggae Kumbia (Kranium Mix)"	Quintanilla III, Vico C	Quintanilla III, Martínez	4:16
3.	"Shhh! (Hip Hop Version)"	Quintanilla III, Martínez, Luigi Giraldo	Quintanilla III, Martínez	4:15
4.	"Azúcar (Dance Mix)"	Quintanilla III, Giraldo, Edward Palmieri	Quintanilla III, Martínez	4:09
5.	"La Cucaracha (Ol' Skool Mix)" (featuring Organized Rhymes)	Quintanilla III, Martínez, Cano, Washington	Quintanilla III, Martínez	3:57
6.	"Boom Boom (Menudo Mix)"	Quintanilla III, Martínez, Giraldo	Quintanilla III, Martínez	4:40
7.	"Desde Que No Estás Aquí (Butta Mix)"	Quintanilla III, Giraldo	Quintanilla III, Martínez	3:52
8.	"U Don't Love Me (Booty Mix)"	Sean Dunson, Johnnie Mae Dunson	Quintanilla III, Martínez	4:37
9.	"Shhh! (Borrashhho Mix)"	Quintanilla III, Martínez, Giraldo	Quintanilla III, Martínez	4:24
10.	"Shhh! (Merengue Version)"	Quintanilla III, Martínez, Giraldo	Quintanilla III, Martínez	4:11
11.	"La Cucaracha (Miami Bounce Mix)" (featuring DJ Laz and Pitbull)	Quintanilla III, Martínez, Cano, Washington, DJ Laz, Armando Pérez	Quintanilla III, Martínez	3:22

== Personnel ==
Kumbia Kings

- A.B. Quintanilla III – bass guitar, backing vocals, producer, composer
- Jason "DJ Kane" Cano – vocals, rap, vocal arrangement, composer
- Francisco "Cisko" Bautista Jr. – vocals
- Andrew "Drew" Maes – vocals
- Cruz Martínez – keyboards, producer, composer
- Alex Ramírez – keyboards
- Roy "Slim" Ramírez – percussion, backing vocals
- Frankie Aranda – percussion
- Jesse "O'Jay" Martínez – drums

Additional musicians and production

- Sergio Angon – design
- DJ Laz – vocals (track 11)
- Sheila E. – percussion (track 2)
- Mike Frost – design
- Luigi Giraldo – engineer, vocal arrangement, production coordination, mixing, composer
- Juan Carlos "JC" Hinojosa – A&R direction
- Brian "Red" Moore – mixing
- Organized Rhymes – vocals (track 5)
- Armando "Pitbull" Pérez – vocals (track 11)
- Miguel Trujillo – art director
- Norma Vivanco – assistant art director

== Charts ==
Chart (2002)	Peak position
US Billboard 200	137
US Top Latin Albums (Billboard)	3
US Top Dance Albums (Billboard)	2
US Latin Pop Albums (Billboard)	2

== Sales and certifications ==
Region	Certification	Certified units/sales
United States (RIAA)	Platinum (Latin)	100,000^{^}
^{^} Shipments figures based on certification alone.
