= What Is This Thing Called Love? (Alexander O'Neal song) =

1991 single by Alexander O'Neal

Single by Alexander O'Neal

from the album All True Man
- Released: 1991
- Genre: Eurodance; R&B; soca; dance-pop
- Length: 6:04 (album version)
- Label: Tabu
- Songwriter: Jimmy Jam and Terry Lewis
- Producer: Jimmy Jam and Terry Lewis

Alexander O'Neal singles chronology
"All True Man" (1991)	"What Is This Thing Called Love?" (1991)	"Shame on Me" (1991)

Music video
- "What Is This Thing Called Love?" on YouTube

"What Is This Thing Called Love?" is a song written by Jimmy Jam and Terry Lewis and recorded by American recording artist Alexander O'Neal. It was released in 1991 by Tabu Records as the second single from the singer's fourth solo album, All True Man (1991). The song's distinctive backing vocals were performed by Lisa Keith. O'Neal's 19th hit single reached number 53 on the UK Singles Chart. In the United States, it peaked at number 21 on the Billboard Hot R&B/Hip-Hop Singles & Tracks chart. The accompanying music video was directed by Dominic Orlando.

In September 2018, DJ David Morales accused Kanye West of stealing the bass line of "I Love It" from his remix to "What Is This Thing Called Love?".

== Track listing ==
- 12" maxi (45 73804)
1. "What Is This Thing Called Love? (Dee Classic 12" Mix)" – 8:20
2. "What Is This Thing Called Love? (Dee Classic Radio Mix)" – 3:37
3. "What Is This Thing Called Love? (LP Edit)" – 3:58
4. "What Is This Thing Called Love? (Dee Red Zone Mix)" – 5:41
5. "What Is This Thing Called Love? (Dee Instrumental Mix)" – 5:58
6. "What Is This Thing Called Love? (Dee Reprise)" – 2:13
- 7" single (656731 7) / Cassette single (656731 4)
1. "What Is This Thing Called Love?" – 4:08
2. "Crying Overtime" – 4:55
- CD single (656731 2)
1. "What Is This Thing Called Love? (Album Version)" – 6:04
2. "The Lovers (Extended Version)" – 7:02
3. "If You Were Here Tonight" – 6:08
- CD single (656731 9)
1. "What Is This Thing Called Love? (Dee Classic 12" Mix)" – 8:20
2. "What Is This Thing Called Love? (Dee Classic Radio Mix)" – 3:37
3. "What Is This Thing Called Love? (Dee Red Zone Mix)" – 5:41
4. "What Is This Thing Called Love? (Dee Reprise)" – 2:13
- Cassette single (35T 73810)
1. "What Is This Thing Called Love? (Dee Classic Radio Mix)" – 3:37
2. "What Is This Thing Called Love? (Dee Instrumental Mix)" – 5:58

== Personnel ==
Credits are adapted from the album's liner notes.

- Alexander O'Neal – lead vocals
- Jimmy Jam – acoustic piano, keyboards, synthesizer, drum programming, rhythm & vocal arrangements
- Terry Lewis – rhythm & vocal arrangements, backing vocals
- Lee Blaskey – string arrangements
- Susie Allard – strings
- Mynra Rian – strings
- Joanna Shelton – strings
- Carolyn Daws – strings
- Mary Bahr – strings
- Lea Foli – strings
- Julia Persilz – strings
- Hyacinthe Tlucek – strings
- Maricia Peck – strings
- Jeanne Ekhold – strings
- Luara Sewell – strings
- Rudolph Lekhter – strings
- Lisa Keith – backing vocals

== Charts ==
Chart (1991)	Peak position
Netherlands (MegaCharts)	81
UK Singles (OCC)	53
UK Airplay (Music Week)	22
UK Dance (Music Week)	34
US Hot Dance Club Songs (Billboard)	10
US Hot R&B Singles (Billboard)	21
