= Hearsay (song) =

"Hearsay 89"

Single by Alexander O'Neal

from the album Hearsay
- B-side: "You Were Meant to Be My Lady"
- Released: 1989
- Genre: R&B
- Length: 4:01 (album version); 3:40 (single version)
- Label: Tabu
- Songwriter(s): James Harris, Terry Lewis
- Producer(s): James Harris, Terry Lewis

Alexander O'Neal singles chronology
"The Christmas Song" (1988)	"Hearsay 89" (1989)	"(What Can I Say) To Make You Love Me" (1989)

"Hearsay" is a song written by Jimmy Jam and Terry Lewis and recorded by American recording artist Alexander O'Neal. It is the fourth track from the O'Neal's second studio album, Hearsay (1987). The original track from the album wasn't released as a single but in 1989, a remixed version was released in the UK and it became a minor hit there, peaking at #56.

== Meaning ==
The song's lyrics are a personal commentary, critical of a spiteful gossip-monger who spreads hearsay.

== Track listing ==
- 12" Single (Tabu 654667 8)
1. "Hearsay 89 (Extended Mix)" – 5:15
2. "Hearsay 89 (Club Instrumental)" – 3:50
3. "Hearsay 89 (Club 7")" – 3:50
4. "You Were Meant to Be My Lady (Keith Cohen Extended Mix)" – 6:44
- 7" Single (Tabu 654667 7 )
1. "Hearsay '89" – 3:40
2. "You Were Meant to Be My Lady (7" Vocal)" – 4:10
- CD Single (Tabu 654667 2)
1. "Hearsay '89 (Extended Mix)" – 5:15
2. "Hearsay '89" – 3:40
3. "Hearsay '89 (Instrumental)" – 3:40
4. "You Were Meant to Be My Lady (Keith Cohen Extended Remix)" – 6:44
