= (What Can I Say) To Make You Love Me =

Single by Alexander O'Neal

from the album Hearsay
- Released: 1988
- Recorded: 1986
- Genre: R&B
- Length: 4:25 (Album version)
- Label: Tabu
- Songwriter: Jimmy Jam and Terry Lewis
- Producer: Jimmy Jam & Terry Lewis

Alexander O'Neal singles chronology
| "The Lovers" (1988) | "(What Can I Say) To Make You Love Me" (1988) | "Fake '88" (1988) |

"(What Can I Say) To Make You Love Me" is a song written by Jimmy Jam and Terry Lewis and recorded by American recording artist Alexander O'Neal. It is the fifth single from his second solo studio album, Hearsay (1987). The song's distinctive backing vocals were performed by Lisa Keith. Following the successful chart performances of the Hearsay singles "Fake", "Criticize", "Never Knew Love Like This", and "The Lovers", "(What Can I Say) To Make You Love Me" was released as the album's fifth single.

== Release ==
The song O'Neal's eleventh top 40 single which reached #27 in the UK Singles Chart in July 1988, and #68 on the R&B chart in O'Neal's native United States.

== Track listing and formats ==
- UK 12" Vinyl single

A1 "(What Can I Say) To Make You Love Me" – 4:25
A2 "A Broken Heart Can Mend" – 3:40
B "You Were Meant to Be My Lady (Not My Girl) (Extended Dance Remix)" – 9:50

- US 7" Vinyl single

A "(What Can I Say) To Make You Love Me (Club 7" Version)" – 4:27
B "(What Can I Say) To Make You Love Me (7" Club Mix W/ Original Bass)" – 3:30

- US 12" Vinyl promo

A1 "(What Can I Say) To Make You Love Me (Hateful Club Mix)" – 6:47
A2 "(What Can I Say) To Make You Love Me (Dance Dub)" – 5:50
A3 "(What Can I Say) To Make You Love Me (Bonus Beats)" – 3:21
B1 "(What Can I Say) To Make You Love Me (Ben Liebrand Remix)" – 6:41
B2 "(What Can I Say) To Make You Love Me (A Capella)" – 3:55

- UK 7" Vinyl single

A "(What Can I Say) To Make You Love Me (Edit)"
B "A Broken Heart Can Mend"

- UK CD single
1. "(What Can I Say) To Make You Love Me" – 4:25
2. "A Broken Heart Can Mend" – 3:40
3. "You Were Meant to Be My Lady (Not My Girl) (Extended Dance Remix)" – 9:50

== Personnel ==
Credits are adapted from the album's liner notes.

- Alexander O'Neal – lead vocals
- Jimmy Jam – drum and keyboard programming, keyboards, percussion
- Terry Lewis – percussion, backing vocals
- Lisa Keith – backing vocals

== Charts ==
| Chart (1988) | Peak position |
|---|---|
| US Hot R&B/Hip-Hop Songs (Billboard) | 68 |
| US Hot Dance Club Songs (Billboard) | 32 |
| UK Singles (Official Charts) | 27 |
