= All True Man (song) =

Single by Alexander O'Neal

from the album All True Man
- Released: 1991
- Genre: R&B
- Length: 5:04 (album version)
- Label: Tabu
- Songwriter: Jimmy Jam and Terry Lewis
- Producers: Jimmy Jam and Terry Lewis

Alexander O'Neal singles chronology
"Saturday Love" (1990)	"All True Man" (1991)	"What Is This Thing Called Love?" (1991)

"All True Man" is a song written by Jimmy Jam and Terry Lewis and recorded by American recording artist Alexander O'Neal. It was released in 1991 by Tabu Records as the first single from the singer's fourth solo studio album, All True Man (1991). It is one of the artist's most recognizable signature songs, and a favourite of many O'Neal fans worldwide. As his 18th hit single, it reached number 18 on the UK Singles Chart, his sixth and most recent single to reach the top 20 there. In the United States, the single reached number five on the Billboard Hot R&B/Hip-Hop Singles & Tracks chart, narrowly missing the top 40 on the Billboard Hot 100.

== Track listing ==
- 12" Maxi (45 73626)
1. "All True Man (Classic Club Mix)" – 7:10
2. "All True Man (Radio Mix)" – 4:03
3. "All True Man (Big House Mix)" – 8:00
4. "All True Man (Big House Instrumental)" – 5:17
- 7" Single (656571 7)
1. "All True Man" – 4:04 #
2. "Hang On" – 6:20
- CD Single (656571 2)
1. "All True Man" – 4:04
2. "Hang On" – 6:20
3. "The Official Bootleg Mega-Mix (12" Version)" – 9:34
- Cassette Single (35T73627)
1. "All True Man (Radio Edit)" – 4:04
2. "All True Man (Instrumental)" – 4:04

== Personnel ==
Credits are adapted from the album's liner notes.

- Alexander O'Neal – lead vocals
- Jimmy Jam – keyboards, synthesizer, drum programming, rhythm & vocal arrangements
- Terry Lewis – percussion, rhythm & vocal arrangements, backing vocals
- Karyn White – backing vocals

== Charts ==
=== Weekly charts ===
Chart (1991)	Peak position
Australia (ARIA)	142
Europe (European Hit Radio)	23
Luxembourg (Radio Luxembourg)	15
Netherlands (Dutch Top 40)	16
Netherlands (Single Top 100)	20
UK Singles (OCC)	18
UK Airplay (Music Week)	6
UK Dance (Music Week)	5
US Billboard Hot 100	43
US Hot R&B/Hip-Hop Songs (Billboard)	5
US Cash Box Top 100	45

=== Year-end charts ===
Chart (1991)	Position
US Hot R&B/Hip-Hop Songs (Billboard)	75
