= Lisa Keith =

American singer

- Born: 1960 (age 65–66)
- Origin: Minnesota, United States
- Genres: Contemporary Pop/R&B/Soul
- Occupation: Singer
- Label: Perspective Records

Lisa Keith (born 1960), currently known as Lisa Bernard, is an American contemporary/pop singer, probably best known for her work as a backing vocalist for other artists and lead vocalist on Herb Alpert's hit single from 1987, "Making Love in the Rain". In 1993 she released her solo debut album, Walkin' in the Sun on Perspective Records; which featured production from Jimmy Jam and Terry Lewis, Narada Michael Walden and Keith's husband Spencer Bernard. The first single "Better Than You" peaked at No. 36 on the Billboard Hot 100, while the follow-up single "I'm in Love" reached No. 84.

Keith was credited on several albums throughout the 1980s and 1990s. She is well known for her background vocals being featured on work by Janet Jackson, Alexander O'Neal, Karyn White, New Edition, and S.O.S. Band, plus other acts produced by Jimmy Jam and Terry Lewis (as well as lead vocals on the chorus of MC Lyte's 1993 single "Ice Cream Dream"). In the late 1980s she also fronted a live Minneapolis Funk band called Rocket (whose members also included producer/session musician Shaun Labelle and drummer John "Bam Bam" Morgan).

In addition to working as a backing vocalist, Keith has also co-written several songs for other artists; such as New Edition's "Crucial" and Nona Hendryx's "Why Should I Cry".

== Discography ==
=== Walkin' in the Sun ===
Released by Perspective Records, August 17, 1993.

1. "Love Isn't Body... It's Soul" (James Harris III, Terry Lewis, Tim Curtis, Tony Addis, Beresford Romeo)
2. "Better Than You" (Keith Thomas, Lisa Keith)
3. "Love Is Alive and Well" (Spencer Bernard, Lisa Keith)
4. "I'm in Love" (James Harris III, Terry Lewis, Lisa Keith)
5. "Days Like These" (Louis Biancaniello, David Harper)
6. "Love for All Seasons" (Bob Johnston, Spencer Bernard, Lisa Keith)
7. "World of Joy" (Spencer Bernard, Lisa Keith)
8. "Sunshine Daydreamin'" (Jarvis Baker, Lisa Keith, Narada Michael Walden)
9. "Closer" (Spencer Bernard, Lisa Keith, Tim Curtis)
10. "Love Me Like You Do" (Spencer Bernard, Lisa Keith)
11. "Free as You Wanna Be" (James Harris III, Terry Lewis, Robert Womack, Henrik Rasmussen, Alonzo Evans, Alvin Marino, Horace Glenn, Joseph Thomas, Kirk Walker, Marvin Andrews, July, Quadri Wallace, Robert Hammond, Walter Simon)
12. "True to You" (Spencer Bernard, Lisa Keith)
13. "Walkin' in the Sun" (Jeff Barry)
14. "Adonai" (Spencer Bernard, Lisa Keith)

Singles

- "Better Than You", released July 13, 1993
- "I'm in Love", released December 7, 1993
- "Love Is Alive and Well", released March 8, 1994

== Charts ==
Year	Title	US Pop	US R&B	US Dan	US Adult Pop	US Rap
1987	"Diamonds" (with Herb Alpert and Janet Jackson)	5	1	1	—	—
1987	"Making Love in the Rain" (with Herb Alpert and Janet Jackson)	35	7	—	21	—
1993	"Ice Cream Dream" (with MC Lyte)	—	—	—	—	11
1993	"Better Than You"	36	—	—	29	—
1994	"I'm in Love"	84	—	—	—	—

Music chart source

== Other appearances ==
- Melanie Brown - Hot - Vocals (Background)
- Yolanda Adams - Believe - Vocals (Background)
- Patti LaBelle - When a Woman Loves - Vocals (Background)
- Puff Johnson - Miracle - Vocals (Background)
- Twila Paris - Where I Stand - Vocals (Background)
- Carman - R.I.O.T. (Righteous Invasion of Truth) - Choir, Chorus
- Phillips, Craig & Dean - Trust - Vocals, Vocals (Background)
- Various Artists - My Utmost for His Highest - Vocals (Background)
- Al Denson - Do You Know This Man? - Vocals (Background)
- Amy Grant - House of Love - Vocals (Background)
- Karyn White - Make Him Do Right - Keyboards, Vocals (Background)
- Jimi Behringer - Think 2 Much - Vocals (Background)
- Johnny Gill - Provocative - Vocals (Background)
- Various Artists - Mo' Money - Vocals (Background)
- Karyn White - Ritual of Love - Vocals (Background)
- Mint Condition - Meant to Be Mint - Vocals (Background)
- Janet Jackson - Janet Jackson's Rhythm Nation 1814 - Vocals (Background)
- Alexander O'Neal - My Gift to You - Arranger, Vocals (Background), Vocal Arrangement
- Herb Alpert - Keep Your Eye on Me - Vocals, Vocals (Background), Vocal Arrangement
- Cherrelle - High Priority - Vocals (Background)
- Janet Jackson - Control - Vocals (Background)
- Alexander O'Neal - Hearsay - Vocals (Background), Rhythm Arrangements
- Alexander O'Neal - "Criticize" - Vocals (Background)
- Human League - "Human" - Vocals (Background)
- Herb Alpert - "Making Love in the Rain" Lead Vocals - (Background)
