= David Eiland =

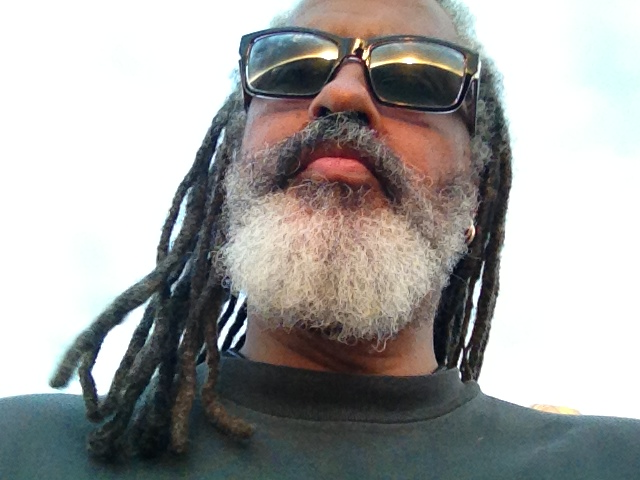

Background information
- Born: St. Louis, Missouri, United States
- Genres: R&B; pop; rock; funk
- Occupations: Musician; producer; composer; author
- Instruments: Saxophone; guitar; bass; drums; wind synths; keys
- Years active: 1970s–present
- Label: Flyte Tyme

David Eiland (born in St. Louis, Missouri) is a musician, composer, recording artist and producer. Eiland is a multi-instrumentalist playing saxophones, guitar, bass, synths, drums, Aerophone, Lyricon and EWI amongst other instruments.

== Biography ==
David Eiland has enjoyed a successful career in the music business for over 50 years. In the 1970s he was member in a variety of bands in the Twin Cities, he was also a founding member of the funk band Flyt Tyme. Throughout his career Eiland has recorded and performed with national artists such as Janet Jackson, David Bowie, Human League, Jonny Lang, Thelma Houston, Alexander O'Neal, Baby and The Pacifiers, Shannon Curfman’s bassist, The New Primitives, and Cherrelle. He also worked as a staff member for Flyte Tyme Productions.

== Awards ==
Eiland won Brass/Reed Player of the Year at the 1995 MMA Awards.
