= Never Knew Love Like This =

Single by Alexander O'Neal featuring Cherrelle

from the album Hearsay
- B-side: "What's Missing"
- Released: 1988
- Recorded: 1986
- Genre: R&B; soul; dance
- Label: Tabu
- Songwriters: James Harris III; Terry Lewis
- Producer: Jimmy Jam & Terry Lewis

Alexander O'Neal singles chronology
"Criticize" (1987)	"Never Knew Love Like This" (1988)	"The Lovers" (1988)

Cherrelle singles chronology
"Artificial Heart" (1986)	"Never Knew Love Like This" (1988)	"Everything I Miss at Home" (1988)

"Never Knew Love Like This" is a top ten US R&B hit song duetted by American R&B singers Cherrelle and Alexander O'Neal; released in 1988. The song peaked at No. 2 in the US R&B chart, No. 26 in the UK and No. 28 in the Billboard Hot 100.

It was the second time Alexander O'Neal and Cherrelle sang together. They sang "Saturday Love" together in 1985 on Cherrelle's gold album High Priority. "Never Knew Love Like This" is featured on Alexander O'Neal's 3× platinum album Hearsay which was released in 1987. The music video was filmed in London.

== Track listing and formats ==
- US, 7" Vinyl single

A "Never Knew Love Like This" – 3:22
B "What's Missing" – 4:02

- US, 12" Vinyl maxi single

A1 "Never Knew Love Like This (Extended Version)" - 5:40
A2 "Never Knew Love Like This (A Cappella)" – 3:30
B1 "Never Knew Love Like This (Instrumental)" – 5:25
B2 "Never Knew Love Like This (Reprise)" – 3:30

- US, 12" Vinyl maxi promo (1988-Re-Mixes)

A1 "Never Knew Love Like This (Saturday Mix)" – 6:53
A2 "Never Knew Love Like This (Saturday Instrumental)" – 6:53
B1 "Never Knew Love Like This (Street Mix)" – 4:57
B2 "Never Knew Love Like This (Dubstrumental)" – 8:09

- Europe CD single
1. "Never Knew Love Like This (Extended Version)" – 5:40
2. "Never Knew Love Like This (Instrumental)" – 5:25
3. "Never Knew Love Like This (Reprise)" – 3:30

== Personnel ==
Credits are adapted from the album's liner notes.

- Alexander O'Neal - lead vocals
- Jimmy Jam - drum and keyboard programming, keyboards, percussion
- Terry Lewis - percussion, backing vocals
- Cherrelle - lead and backing vocals
- Randy Ran - backing vocals
- David Eiland - saxophone solo

== Charts ==
=== Weekly charts ===
Chart (1988)	Peak position
Belgium VRT Top 30	24
German Media Control Charts	49
UK Singles (Official Charts)	26
US Billboard Hot 100	28
US Hot R&B/Hip-Hop Songs (Billboard)	2
Dutch MegaCharts	24

== Covers ==
The song was covered by Pauline Henry featuring Wayne Marshall in 1996. It managed to enter the UK Singles Chart, peaking at No. 40.
