= Fake (Alexander O'Neal song) =

Single by Alexander O'Neal

from the album Hearsay
- B-side: "A Broken Heart Can Mend"
- Released: 1987
- Recorded: 1986
- Genre: Post-disco, dance-pop, R&B
- Length: 3:57 (album version); 3:10 (single edit)
- Label: Tabu
- Songwriter: James Harris, Terry Lewis
- Producers: James Harris, Terry Lewis

Alexander O'Neal singles chronology
"You Were Meant to Be My Lady (Not My Girl)" (1986)	"Fake" (1987)	"Criticize" (1987)

"Fake" is a song written by Jimmy Jam and Terry Lewis and recorded by American recording artist Alexander O'Neal. It is the first single from the O'Neal's second studio album, Hearsay (1987). It is one of the artist's most recognizable songs and a favorite of many O'Neal fans worldwide.

== Meaning ==
The song's lyrics are a personal commentary, critical of a loudmouth – implied to be a groupie. The woman being criticized continues to change details about her wardrobe, personality, and history with each successive date, causing the narrator's response that she is a fraudulent person. On the accompanying album Hearsay, "Fake" is preceded by a brief interlude in which a belligerent woman accidentally knocks a man's drink onto his shirt at a party and insists it was his fault. He and his friends defend themselves, eventually deriding her bad behavior as the song begins.

== Release ==
The single was O'Neal's most successful song on both the US soul and pop charts. "Fake" went to number one on the Hot Black Singles chart for two weeks and peaked at number 25 on the Billboard Hot 100. The single was also O'Neal's most successful single on the dance charts, peaking at number seven. It initially reached number 33 on the UK singles chart in 1987 but would reach a higher peak of number 16 with the release of a remixed version in 1988.

The song's punchy drum/percussion beat pattern was also later sampled for the song "Sleigh Ride" off of O'Neal's fourth, and specifically, first and only Christmas album My Gift to You (1988), in addition to a bass line played similar to that of "Fake".

== Track listing and formats ==
- US 12" Vinyl Maxi(TBU 650859 6, 650859 6)

A1 "Fake" (Extended Version) – 5:20
A2 "Fake" (Edit Version) – 3:11
B1 "Fake" (Patty Mix) – 3:10
B2 "Fake" (A Cappella) – 2:20
B3 "Fake" (Instrumental) – 4:35

- US 7" Vinyl Single(Tabu ZS4-07100)

A "Fake" (Edited Version) – 3:10
B "A Broken Heart Can Mend" – 3:40

== Personnel ==
Credits are adapted from the album's liner notes.

- Alexander O'Neal – lead vocals
- Jimmy Jam – drum and keyboard programming, keyboards, percussion, backing vocals
- Terry Lewis – percussion, backing vocals

== Charts ==
=== Weekly charts ===
Chart (1987)	Peak position
Belgium VRT Top 30	15
Dutch MegaCharts	20
German Media Control Charts	17
Swiss Music Charts	22
New Zealand (Recorded Music NZ)	16
UK Singles Chart	33
US Billboard Hot 100	25
US Hot R&B/Hip-Hop Songs (Billboard)	1
US Hot Dance Club Songs (Billboard)	7
US Cash Box Top 100	29
