= Criticize (song) =

1987 single by Alexander O'Neal

- U.S. cover art

Single by Alexander O'Neal

from the album Hearsay
- B-side: "A Broken Heart Can Mend" / "Fake (Extended Version)" (UK 12" only)
- Released: September 23, 1987
- Recorded: 1986 (album version); 1987 (remix version)
- Genre: R&B; soul
- Length: 4:09 (album version); 4:00 (single version)
- Label: Tabu
- Songwriters: Alexander O'Neal; Garry Johnson
- Producers: Jellybean Johnson; Jimmy Jam & Terry Lewis

Alexander O'Neal singles chronology
| "Fake" (1987) | "Criticize" (1987) | "Never Knew Love Like This" (1988) |

"Criticize" is a song by the American singer Alexander O'Neal, written by O'Neal and Jellybean Johnson. It was the second single from O'Neal's second solo album, Hearsay (1987). The song's distinctive backing vocals were performed by Lisa Keith.

== Release ==
In the US, "Criticize" reached number four on the R&B chart, and number 70 on the Billboard Hot 100. "Criticize" reached number four on the UK singles chart, becoming O'Neal's biggest hit in Britain, and in 2020 was certified silver by the British Phonographic Industry. It reached number 14 on the Irish Singles Chart.

== Music video ==
The music video was directed by Marcelo Anciano.

== Track listing and formats ==
- US 7" Vinyl single

A "Criticize" – 4:00
B "A Broken Heart Can Mend" – 3:40

- US 12" Vinyl maxi single

A1 "Criticize (Remix)" – 7:00
A2 "Criticize (Edit)" – 3:55
B1 "Criticize (Critical Mix)" – 5:30
B2 "Criticize (Critical Dub)" – 4:30

- UK 7" Vinyl single

A "Criticize" – 4:00
B1 "Criticize (Critical Edit)" – 3:45
B2 "Criticize (Nag Mix)" – 1:35

- UK 12" vinyl single'

A "Criticize (Remix)" – 7:00
B1 "Criticize (Critical Mix)" – 5:30
B2 "Fake (Extended Version)" – 5:20

== Personnel ==
Credits are adapted from the album's liner notes.

- Alexander O'Neal – lead vocals and backing vocals
- Jellybean Johnson – synthesizers, electric guitar and drum machine
- Jimmy Jam – synthesizers
- Lisa Keith – backing vocals
- Brie Howard-Darling – drums, matraca and timbales

== Charts ==
=== Weekly charts ===
| Chart (1987) | Peak position |
|---|---|
| Ireland (IRMA) | 14 |
| Netherlands (Dutch Top 40) | 17 |
| Norway (VG-lista) | 10 |
| New Zealand (Recorded Music NZ) | 40 |
| UK Singles (Official Charts) | 4 |
| US Billboard Hot 100 | 70 |
| US Dance Club Songs (Billboard) | 21 |
| US Hot R&B/Hip-Hop Songs (Billboard) | 4 |
| West Germany (GfK) | 24 |

=== Certifications ===
| Region | Certification | Certified units/sales |
|---|---|---|
| United Kingdom (BPI) Sales since 2012 | Gold | 400,000^{‡} |
^{‡} Sales+streaming figures based on certification alone.

== Re-recording ==
Alexander O’Neal re-recorded “Criticize” in 1998 with producers Errol Jones and John Girvan. The song was released as a commercial single, peaking at number 51 on the UK Singles Chart.

=== Track listing ===
- UK CD Single (OWECD3)
1. "Criticize (‘98 Critical Yojo Working Radio Mix)" – 3:59
2. "Criticize (‘98 Chill Out Positivity Krew Radio Mix)" – 4:38
3. "Criticize (‘98 Critical Yojo Working Club Mix)" – 6:56
4. "Criticize (‘98 House Positivity Mix)" – 4:20
- UK 12” Single (OWET3)
1. "Criticize (‘98 Critical Yojo Working Club Mix)" – 6:56
2. "Criticize (‘98 Critical Yojo Working Radio Mix)" – 3:59
3. "Criticize (‘98 Dub Mix)" – 4:38
- Germany 12” Single (0066260CLU)
1. "Criticize 1999 (Bini & Martini Club Vocal Mix)" – 7:22
2. "Criticize 1999 (Bini & Martini Ocean Dub)" – 6:05
3. "Criticize 1999 (Bini & Martini Subsonic Vocal Mix)" – 8:30
4. "Criticize 1999 (Bini & Martini Subsonic Dub)" – 7:52
- Germany 12” Single (0066540CLU)
1. "Criticize (Stonebridge Club Mix)" – 9:52
2. "Criticize (Critical Yojo Working Club Mix)" – 6:56
3. "Criticize (Jamie Lewis Phat Club Mix)" – 7:49
- Italy 12” Single (BLUE012)
1. "Criticize '99 (Jamie Lewis Phat Club Mix)" – 7:49
2. "Criticize '99 (Harley & Muscle Deep House Mix)" – 7:54
- Italy 12” Single (BLUE013)
1. "Criticize 1999 (Bini & Martini Club Vocal Mix)" – 7:22
2. "Criticize 1999 (Bini & Martini Ocean Dub)" – 6:05
3. "Criticize 1999 (Bini & Martini Sub Sonic Vocal Dub)" – 8:30
