= Jellybean Johnson =

American musician (1956–2025)

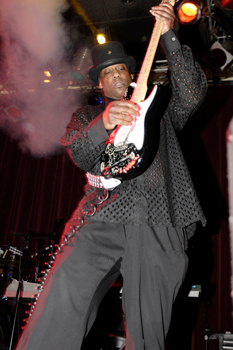
- Johnson performing in 2006

Background information
- Born: Garry George Johnson; November 19, 1956; Chicago, Illinois, U.S.
- Origin: Minneapolis, Minnesota, U.S.
- Died: November 21, 2025 (aged 69) Robbinsdale, Minnesota, U.S.
- Genres: Pop; R&B; soul; funk; rock; hard rock; new jack swing; funk rock; funk metal; dance; new wave; grunge; hip-hop
- Occupation: Musician
- Instruments: Drums; guitar
- Years active: 1981–2025
- Labels: Warner Bros.; Paisley
- Formerly of: The Time; Flyte Tyme; The Family

Garry George "Jellybean" Johnson (November 19, 1956 – November 21, 2025) was an American drummer, guitarist, songwriter, record producer, and musician based out of Minneapolis, Minnesota. He was best known for his involvement with the Time and its predecessor group Flyte Time, serving as a founding member of both groups.

== Early life and education ==
As a youth, Johnson relocated from Chicago to Minneapolis. He received drum lessons at age 13 and two years later began teaching himself guitar. He attended Marshall-University High School, where he played on its basketball team, then attended the University of Minnesota.

== Career ==
As the drummer for the Time, Johnson worked alongside famed producers Jimmy Jam and Terry Lewis and recorded with and/or produced many notable artists including Alexander O'Neal, Cherrelle, New Edition, and Janet Jackson, with whom he had the 1990 No. 1 single, "Black Cat".

After the breakup of the Time, Johnson worked as a producer-musician as well as songwriter and became a long-time associate of Flyte Tyme productions. His first assignment was Alexander O'Neal's No. 11 R&B hit "Innocent" (produced by fellow Time bandmates Jimmy Jam and Terry Lewis), on which he contributed both drums and guitar solos for the second half of the ten-minute long song. From this recording forward, Johnson became an in-demand session guitarist, drummer, and percussionist. He also produced a number of hits for the aforementioned as well as New Edition and helmed Mint Condition's 1991 debut album Meant to Be Mint.

Johnson re-joined the Time for the Prince feature film Graffiti Bridge and its accompanying Time album, Pandemonium. Shortly after, Johnson returned to touring with Morris Day, while continuing to produce emerging artists and work as a session player.

In 2008, he collaborated with Rihanna at the 50th Annual Grammy Awards, then began work on his solo debut. Following the unexpected death of Prince in 2016, Johnson halted production. He returned to the Grammy Stage for both the 2017 tribute and the 2020 Salute To Prince, and finally released the album Get Experienced in 2021.

In 2022, Johnson founded the Minneapolis Sound Museum. That same year, he and fellow members of The Time were awarded a Soul Train Lifetime Achievement Award.

== Personal life and death ==
Johnson was 6 ft 4 in (1.93 m) and played competitive basketball as a teenager. He had seven children, all whom had through previous relationships. From the late 1990s until his death, Johnson was in a romantic relationship with Minneapolis entrepreneur Marty (Martha) Bragg. Johnson and Bragg had no known children. Johnson died at the age of 69 on November 21, 2025.

== Discography ==
=== Albums ===
- 1981 – The Time
- 1982 – What Time is it?
- 1984 – Ice Cream Castle
- 1985 – The Family
- 1990 – Pandemonium

=== Songs produced ===
- Alexander O'Neal – "Criticize" (No. 4 R&B)
- Nona Hendryx – "Why Should I Cry" (No. 5 R&B)
- New Edition – "Crucial" (No. 4 R&B)
- Janet Jackson – "Black Cat" (No. 1 Rock / No. 1 Pop / No. 10 R&B)
- Mint Condition – "Breakin' My Heart (Pretty Brown Eyes)" (No. 3 R&B / No. 6 Pop) and "Forever in Your Eyes" (No. 7 R&B).
