= Alexander O'Neal =

American R&B singer, songwriter and arranger (born 1953)

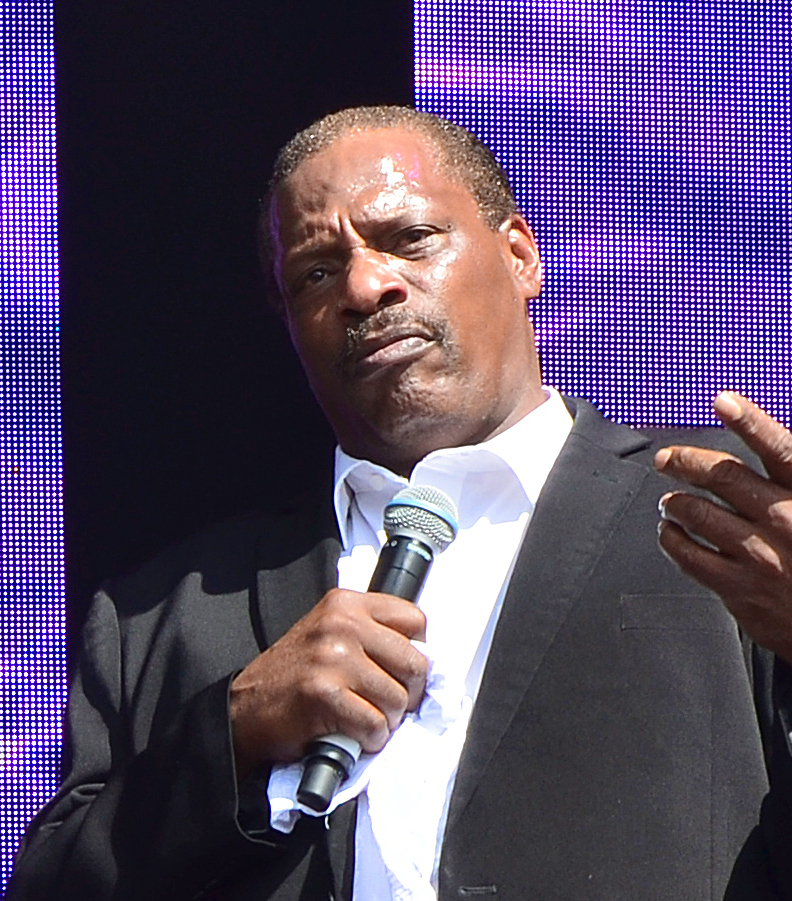
- O'Neal performing in 2014

Background information
- Born: November 15, 1953 (age 72); Natchez, Mississippi, U.S.
- Origin: Minneapolis, Minnesota, U.S.
- Genres: R&B; soul; funk; rock; pop
- Occupations: Singer; songwriter; arranger
- Instrument: Vocals
- Years active: 1973–2024
- Labels: Tabu; Epic; One World; Eagle; Eminence

Alexander O'Neal (born November 15, 1953) is an American retired R&B singer, songwriter and arranger who rose to prominence in the mid-1980s as a solo artist, with eleven top 40 singles on the US R&B chart, three of which also reached the top 40 of the Billboard Hot 100. However, he enjoyed more mainstream success in the United Kingdom, achieving fourteen top 40 singles on the UK singles chart between 1985 and 1996, along with three top ten albums on the UK Albums Chart.

O'Neal released his debut album, the eponymous Alexander O'Neal, in 1985, which spawned the commercially successful singles "Innocent", "If You Were Here Tonight", "A Broken Heart Can Mend" and "What's Missing". In 1985, he collaborated with Cherrelle on the single "Saturday Love" which reached the top twenty of the Billboard Hot 100. In 1987, he released his critically acclaimed second solo album Hearsay which continued his production partnership with Jimmy Jam and Terry Lewis. Hearsay was a major commercial success, peaking at number twenty-nine on the Billboard 200 and number two on Top R&B/Hip-Hop Albums. The album was even more successful in the United Kingdom, peaking at number four. It was certified gold by the RIAA on October 20, 1987. In the UK, it sold more than 900,000 copies, being certified 3× Platinum by the BPI.

The late 1980s marked the peak of O'Neal's career, scoring several appearances on the Billboard Hot 100 with singles including "Fake", "Criticize" and "Never Knew Love Like This". Other commercially successful singles released during this period include "The Lovers" and "(What Can I Say) To Make You Love Me". In 1991, he released "All True Man" as the lead single from his fourth solo album of the same name. The album was a major commercial success in the United Kingdom, peaking at number two, however, in the United States fared less favourably following a peak position of forty-nine on the Billboard 200. In 1993, he released his first album without production input from Jimmy Jam and Terry Lewis – Love Makes No Sense. The lead single from the album missed the Billboard Hot 100 charts, but reached the top forty in the United Kingdom.

Subsequent studio albums Lovers Again (1996), Saga of a Married Man (2002), Alex Loves... (2008) and Five Questions: The New Journey (2010) achieved moderate success in the United Kingdom. AllMusic described O'Neal as having a "tough voice [that] has the same grain and range as that of Otis Redding."

== Early life ==
Alexander O'Neal was born November 15, 1953, in Natchez, Mississippi, United States, just a few months after his father died. After graduating from high school in Natchez, he attended Alcorn State University. At the age of 20, he relocated to Minneapolis, where he performed with several bands including the Mystics and Wynd Chymes. He became a member of Enterprise for a brief period before joining Flyte Tyme, a band which included Monte Moir, Jimmy Jam and Terry Lewis.

After a relationship of over 30 years, O'Neal married Cynthia in 2024.

== Career ==
=== The Time (1980–1981) ===
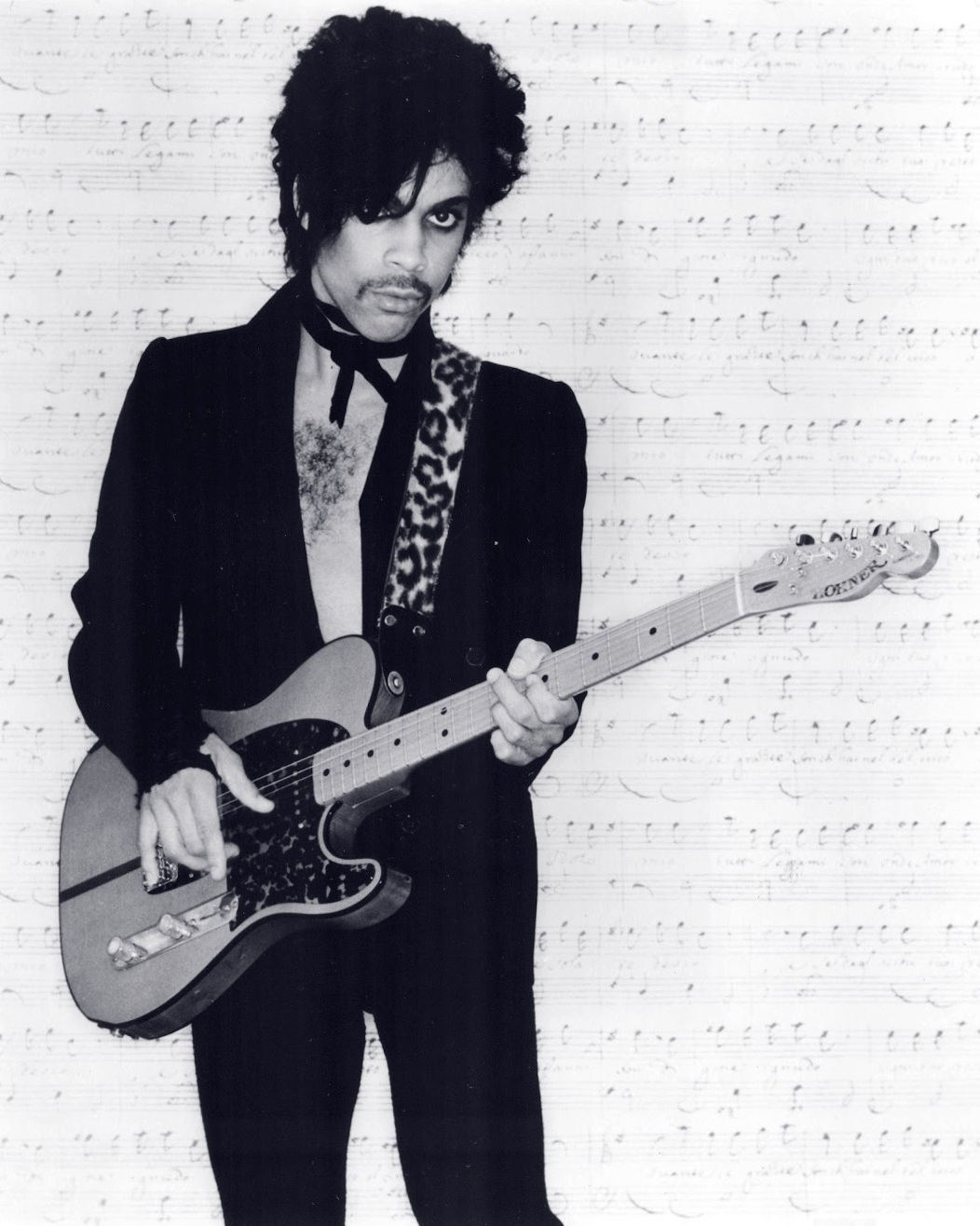
O'Neal was originally a member of the Prince (pictured) formed band The Time, but was dismissed and replaced with Morris Day

According to Jimmy Jam, around 1980–1981, O'Neal (along with fellow members of the band Flyte Tyme) met with Prince and Morris Day at Perkins restaurant in Minneapolis to discuss forming a band that would be called The Time that would be signed to Prince under the Warner Bros. label. Following a disagreement with Prince, O'Neal was replaced as lead singer by Morris Day. It was later discovered that Prince believed that O'Neal was "too black" to be in the band, which ultimately led to his dismissal and being replaced by Morris Day.

O'Neal subsequently formed an R&B band called Alexander and recorded a couple 12" singles, "Do You Dare/Playroom" and "Attitude" for a Chicago area independent label, based in Merrillville, Indiana, called Erect Records.

In 1984, O'Neal signed a deal with Clarence Avant's Tabu Records. He did some background vocals for other artists on the same label, including The S.O.S. Band and Cherrelle.

=== Debut solo album (1985–1987) ===
In 1985, O'Neal released his self-titled debut album under the production of Jimmy Jam and Terry Lewis as well as Monte Moir. It included three singles that reached the Top 20 of the R&B Singles Chart.

After release, the album was received favourably by the majority of music critics. One of O'Neal's most commercially successful solo albums, in the United States it went on to peak at number 92 on the Billboard 200 and number 21 on Top R&B/Hip-Hop Albums. The album launched four charting singles in the United Kingdom. "If You Were Here Tonight" peaked at number 13 on the UK Singles Chart; "A Broken Heart Can Mend" peaked at number 53; "What's Missing" at number 90; "You Were Meant to Be My Lady (Not My Girl)" at number 98. In the UK, the album sold more than 100,000 copies and was certified gold by the BPI.

The same year, he also scored his first R&B Top 10 single with "Saturday Love", a duet with Cherrelle from her High Priority album. The song peaked at No. 2 on the R&B chart and No. 26 on the pop chart, while also beginning a string of UK hit singles for O'Neal by peaking at No. 6 on the UK Singles Chart in early 1986. This UK success continued when "If You Were Here Tonight", which had previously peaked at No. 81, re-entered the charts to reach No. 13 in March 1986.

=== Hearsay and success (1987–1991) ===
In 1987, O'Neal released the album Hearsay, a concept album, based around the attendees of a house soirée being hosted by O'Neal, which was certified gold in the US and yielded his biggest US hit in "Fake", which topped the R&B chart and reached No. 25 on the pop chart. The song also peaked at No. 7 on the Billboard dance chart. The follow-up single, "Criticize", peaked at No. 4 on the R&B chart and No. 70 on the pop chart. The third single, "Never Knew Love Like This", another duet with Cherrelle, peaked at No. 2 on the R&B chart and No. 28 on the pop chart. However, by this time O'Neal was enjoying much greater success in the UK, where Hearsay peaked at No. 4 on the UK Albums Chart, eventually being certified triple platinum and spawning six Top 40 hits on the UK Singles Chart. The most successful of these gave O'Neal his biggest UK hit when "Criticize" peaked at No. 4 on the chart in late 1987. "Fake" became a UK Top 40 hit twice, first in 1987 followed by a remix ("Fake '88") in 1988. The "Hit Mix" (a megamix of O'Neal's hits) also reached the UK Top 20 in December 1989.

Among retrospective assessments, Ron Wynn of AllMusic wrote that Jam and Lewis provided "their finest and tightest production for any O'Neal record", adding that "the beats were catchy, the songs hook-laden, and O'Neal's voice alternately explosive, sensitive and bemused." Daryl Easlea of the BBC wrote that Hearsay was "[d]ismissed by the cognoscenti but adored by the masses." He deemed it O'Neal's best work and a filler-free record which, whilst "very much of its time", has not dated, adding: "It sounds as fresh now as it did then. Had it been 20 years earlier, Alexander O'Neal would have been compared to Otis Redding." In a piece on Jam and Lewis for Stylus Magazine, Marcello Carlin described the "epic" Hearsay as "Jam and Lewis' absolute masterpiece; sexual but nasty tirades blasting out over uncompromising avalanches of the unreal." He added that, as "a seamless marriage between old school and cold rationalist new," the album is equalled only by Son of Bazerk's Bazerk Bazerk Bazerk (1991), a record whose futuristic, "hot-blooded minimalism" he deemed unimaginable without Jam and Lewis' influence.

In December 1988, O'Neal released a Christmas album, My Gift to You, featuring a cover of "The Christmas Song" that reached the UK Top 40.

=== Continued success (1991–1996) ===
In 1991, O'Neal released his fourth album, All True Man. The album was certified gold in the US, with the title track reaching No. 5 on the R&B chart and No. 43 on the pop chart. The album became his highest charting release in the UK, reaching No. 2 and going gold, although it ultimately sold fewer copies than Hearsay. The title track reached No. 18 on the UK Singles Chart. In 1992, his first greatest hits album, This Thing Called Love: The Greatest Hits of Alexander O'Neal, became another Top 5 success in the UK.

In 1993, O'Neal's final album with the Tabu label, Love Makes No Sense, was released. This was the first album made without production from Jam and Lewis. Although it reached the UK Top 20 and two singles from the album reached the UK Top 40, sales were not as strong as his earlier releases. After leaving Tabu O'Neal signed for Motown, but no singles or albums were released. In 1995, another greatest hits compilation, The Best of Alexander O'Neal, was released. A year later the compilation was re-released with three added tracks from O'Neal's short period with Motown.

=== Lovers Again and decline (1996–2014) ===
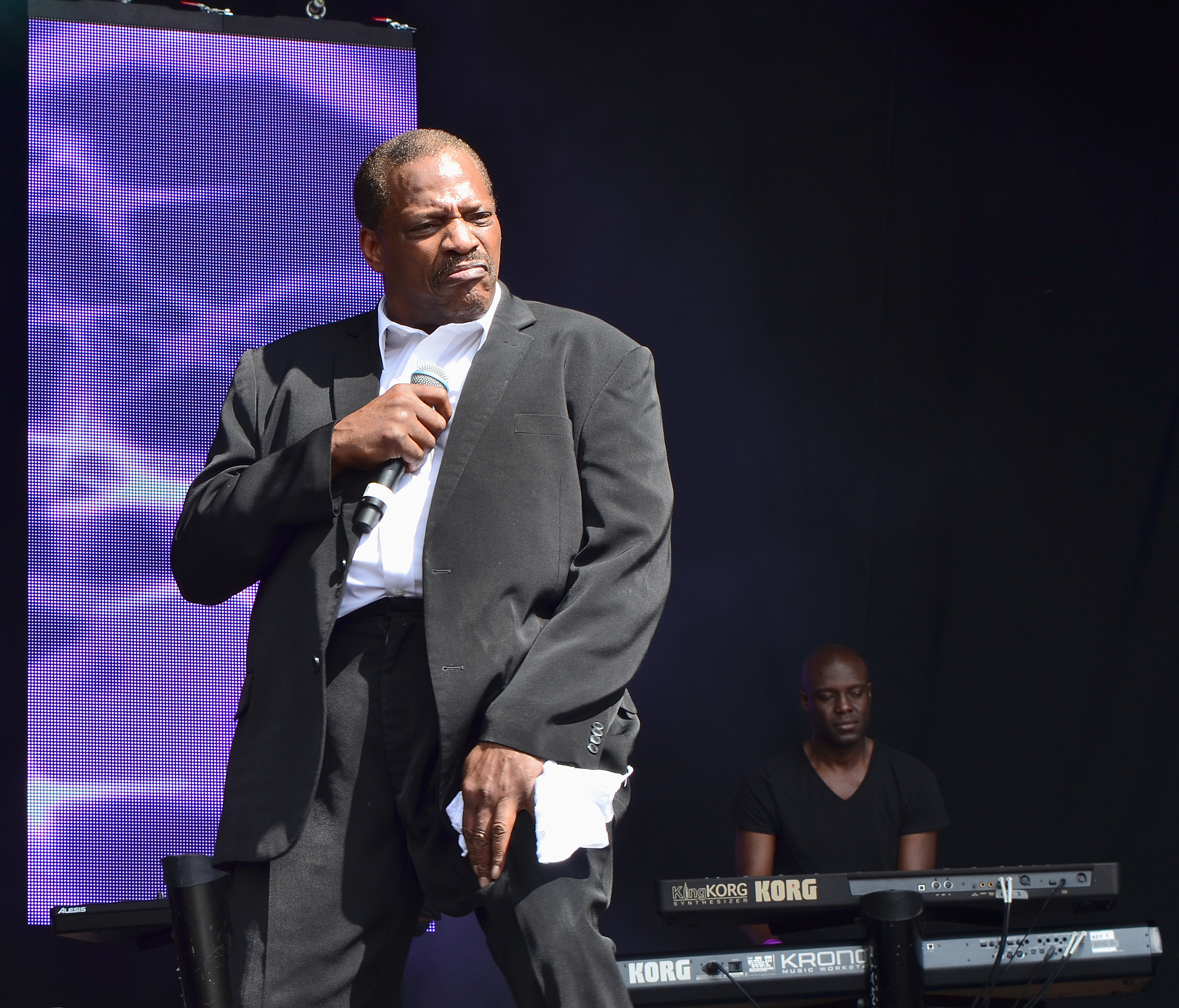
O'Neal performing in Bristol, 2014

In 1996, his first album with One World Records, Lovers Again, was released. The album did not chart in the UK, though the single "Let's Get Together" reached the UK Top 40. In 2001, he released an album on Eagle Records, Saga of a Married Man. The album was produced by former Prince drummer, Bobby Z. In 2005, he recorded his first live album, Alexander O'Neal Live at Hammersmith Apollo, featuring songs from throughout his career.

In 2006 O'Neal appeared on the Weakest Link, All Singing All Dancing Edition, where he was the 5th contestant voted off the show. In 2006 and 2007, O'Neal participated on the British reality singing contest show Just the Two of Us. In 2008 O'Neal took part in a Wife Swap UK special, swapping his wife Cynthia with broadcaster and TV personality Jilly Goolden. The programme included an in-depth interview with O'Neal by noted UK R&B writer Pete Lewis of the award-winning magazine Blues & Soul. The interview was featured in full in the August 2008 issue of the magazine. In 2008, O'Neal released Alex Loves..., his first studio album in six years. The album peaked at No. 49 in the UK, and was his first charting album of new material in 15 years.

In 2011 the TV One series Unsung profiled O'Neal's rise to fame, along with the story of Cherrelle. In 2014, O'Neal signed a new management deal with Howard Perl Management (Beverly Hills), which awarded him extensive tours and a cast member on Celebrity Big Brother.

=== Later works and farewell tour (2014–2024) ===
In 2015, O'Neal took part in the British Channel 5 reality series Celebrity Big Brother. On Day 10, During an argument with fellow Housemate Perez Hilton, O'Neal referred to Hilton as a "silly ass faggot," for which he was given a formal warning by the shows' producers. On Day 12, O'Neal voluntarily left the show.

In June 2016, O'Neal collaborated with Manchester-based funk band, Mamma Freedom, on the single, "Fake", a re-recording of his 1987 single of the same name. The single was released shortly before O'Neal embarked upon a UK tour, with Mamma Freedom providing support. In 2017, O'Neal collaborated with Mamma Freedom on the album Hearsay30, a re-recording of his 1987 album. The album was released on December 1, 2017.

In 2019, O'Neal made an appearance alongside Cherrelle at the Soul Train Awards to pay tribute to long-time collaborators Jimmy Jam and Terry Lewis. In 2021, O'Neal made an appearance alongside Whyso, O'Mega Red, and J Dore of The High Children on "Say His Name", a song dedicated to the memory of George Floyd.

In 2023, O'Neal announced on his social media he would soon be announcing the U.K. dates to his farewell tour, Time to Say Goodbye. Subsequently announcing his retirement, saying, "I've had an amazing career, and I'm so grateful to my fans for their unwavering support over the years. I'm excited to hit the road one last time, and give you a night you'll never forget."

== Honors and awards ==
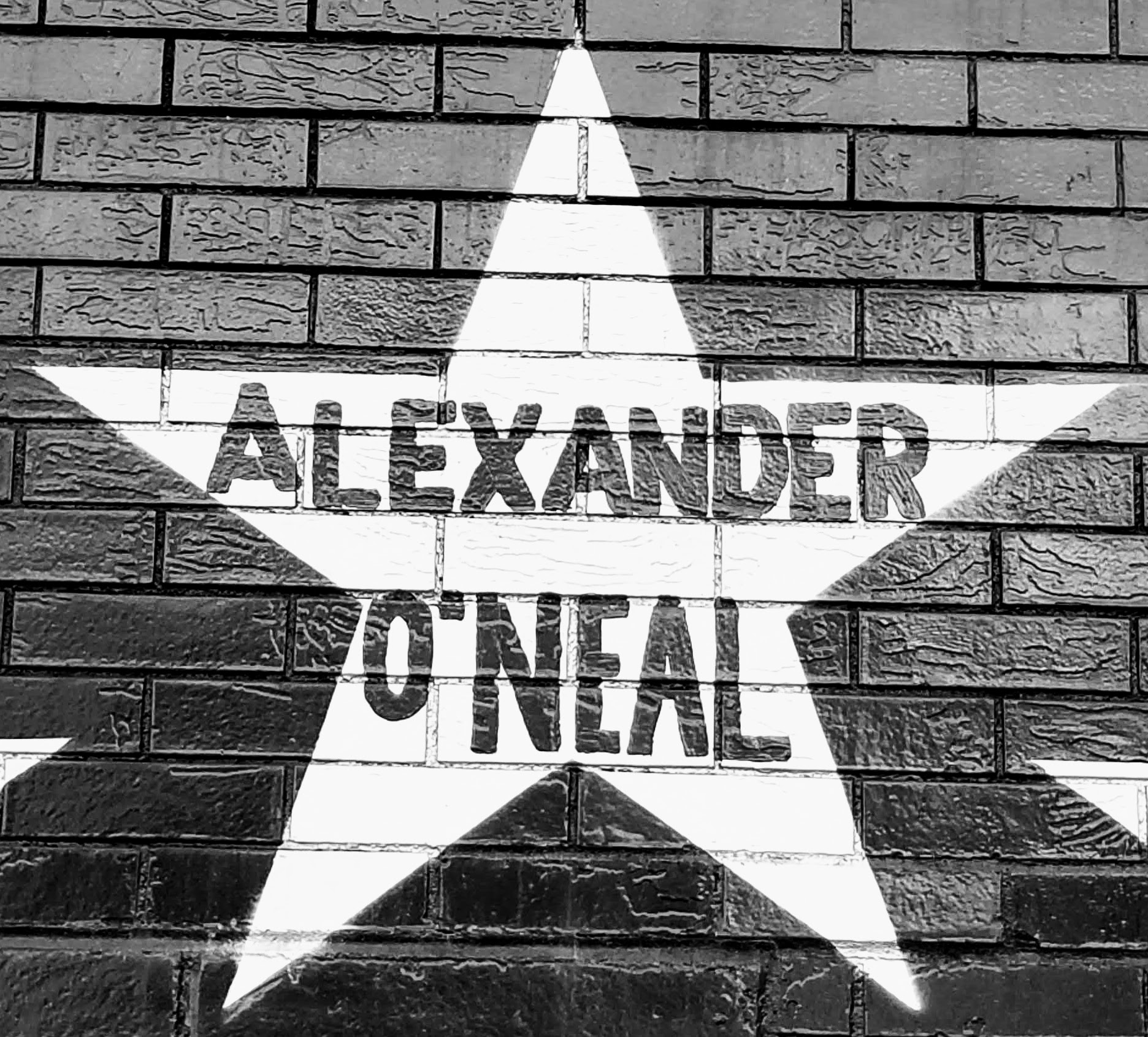
Star honoring Alexander O'Neal on the outside mural of the Minneapolis nightclub First Avenue

O'Neal was honored with a star on the outside mural of the Minneapolis nightclub First Avenue, recognizing performers that have played sold-out shows or have otherwise demonstrated a major contribution to the culture at the iconic venue. Receiving a star "might be the most prestigious public honor an artist can receive in Minneapolis," according to journalist Steve Marsh.

== Discography ==
- Alexander O'Neal (1985)
- Hearsay (1987)
- My Gift to You (1988)
- All True Man (1991)
- Love Makes No Sense (1993)
- Lovers Again (1996)
- Saga of a Married Man (2002)
- Alex Loves... (2008)
- Five Questions: The New Journey (2010)

== Tours ==
- 30 Years of Hearsay Tour (2017)
- A Time To Say Goodbye Tour (2023)
