= Keke Wyatt discography =

R&B/soul recording artist discography

- Studio albums: 5
- Extended plays: 1
- Soundtrack albums: 2
- Singles: 12
- Music videos: 9
- Guest appearances: 4

The discography of American R&B and soul singer Keke Wyatt consists of five studio albums, two unreleased albums, twelve singles, four collaborations and nine music videos. Wyatt has had three record deals with MCA Records, Shanachie Records and her own record label Aratek Entertainment distributed through INgrooves Music Group.

She released her debut album, Soul Sista on November 13, 2001, through MCA Records. The album peaked at number 33 on the Billboard 200, number 5 on the Top R&B/Hip-Hop Albums chart and was certified gold by the Recording Industry Association of America (RIAA). Her debut single "Used to Love" (2001) peaked at number 65 on the US Hot R&B/Hip-Hop Songs chart. Her second single "Nothing in This World" (2001) with singer Avant peaked at number 27 on the US Billboard Hot 100. Her third single "I Don't Wanna" (2002) failed to chart in the United States.

In 2005, she released the single "Put Your Hands on Me", which was set to be included on her second studio album Emotional Rollercoaster. The album was planned to be released on May 31, 2005, through Cash Money Records/Universal Motown Records but after two postponed release dates, the release was cancelled altogether. In 2007, she released the single "Ghetto Rose" from her second album, which was to have the same title as the single. The album was set for release on October 23, 2007, through TVT Records but was postponed for release in early 2008. In February 2008, the record label filed for bankruptcy, which resulted in Wyatt's album being shelved.

She released her second studio album, Who Knew?, on February 23, 2010, through Shanachie Records. The album peaked at number 35 on the Top R&B/Hip-Hop Albums chart. The album's lead single "Who Knew?" was released on January 4, 2010. She released her third studio album, Unbelievable, on June 14, 2011, through Shanachie Records. The album's lead single "Saturday Love", which features Ruben Studdard, was released on .

The singer's first EP, Ke'Ke', was released on May 6, 2014, through Aratek Entertainment. The lead single "Fall in Love" charted at number 20 on the Bubbling Under Hot 100. The second single "Lie Under You" (2014) failed to chart in the United States.

She released her fourth studio album, Rated Love, on April 22, 2016, through Aratek Entertainment. The lead single "Sexy Song" was released on November 10, 2015. The second single "Love Me" did not chart in the United States. On October 13, 2016, "Jodeci" was released as the third single and included on the deluxe version of the album, which was released on October 21, 2016.

== Albums ==
=== Studio albums ===
List of studio albums, with selected chart positions, sales figures and certifications
Title	Album details	Peak chart positions		Sales
Title	Album details	US	US R&B /HH	Sales
Soul Sista	Released: November 13, 2001; Label: MCA; Formats: CD	33	5	RIAA: Gold
Who Knew?	Released: February 23, 2010; Label: Shanachie; Formats: CD, digital download	—	35	
Unbelievable	Released: June 14, 2011; Label: Shanachie; Formats: CD, digital download	—	48	
Rated Love	Released: April 22, 2016; Label: Aratek Entertainment, INgrooves; Formats: CD, digital download	—	19	
Keke Covers	Released: February 14, 2017; Label: Aratek Entertainment; Format: Digital download	—	—	
Certfified	Released: June 28, 2024; Label: Shanachie; Format: CD, digital download	—	—	
"—" denotes releases that did not chart or were not released in that territory.

=== Unreleased albums ===
Title	Album details
Emotional Rollercoaster	Shelved; Intended release: May 31, 2005; Labels: Cash Money Records/MCA
Ghetto Rose	Shelved; Intended release: 2007; Labels: TVT

== EPs ==
List of EPs, with selected chart positions and sales figures
Title	EP details	Peak chart positions			Sales
Title	EP details	US	US R&B	US Ind.	Sales
Ke'Ke'	Released: May 6, 2014; Label: The NorthStar Group/Aratek Entertainment; Format: Digital download	190	25	35	US: 20,000

== Singles ==
=== As lead artist ===
List of singles as main artist, with selected chart positions
Title	Year	Peak chart positions			Album
Title	Year	US	US R&B /HH	US Adult R&B	Album
"Used to Love"	2001	—	65	—	Soul Sista
"Nothing in This World" (featuring Avant)	2001	27	4	12	Soul Sista
"I Don't Wanna"	2002	—	—	38	Soul Sista
"Put Your Hands on Me"	2005	—	—	—	Emotional Rollercoaster
"Ghetto Rose"	2007	—	—	—	Ghetto Rose
"Who Knew?"	2010	—	—	38	Who Knew?
"Saturday Love" (featuring Ruben Studdard)	2011	—	—	31	Unbelievable
"Fall in Love"	2014	— (Note: "Fall in Love" did not enter the Billboard Hot 100, but peaked at number 20 on the Bubbling Under Hot 100 chart.)	—	—	Ke'Ke'
"Sexy Song"	2015	—	—	26	Rated Love
"Love Me"	2016	—	—	—	Rated Love
"Jodeci"	2016	—	—	—	Rated Love
"Summertime"	2017	—	—	—	Country Fried Soul
"Water into Wine"	2023	—	—	—	Certified
"Certified"	2024	—	—	—	Certified
"—" denotes releases that did not chart or were not released in that territory.

=== As featured artist ===
List of singles as featured artist, with selected chart positions
Title	Year	Peak chart positions					Album
Title	Year	US	US R&B	US Adult R&B	US Gospel Airplay	US Gospel Digital	Album
"My First Love" (Avant featuring Keke Wyatt)	2001	26	4	1	—	—	My Thoughts
"It's Going Down" (Blackalicious)	2003	—	—	—	—	—	Blazing Arrow
"You & I" (Avant featuring Keke Wyatt)	2012	— (Note: "You & I" did not enter the Billboard Hot 100, but peaked at number 23 on the Bubbling Under Hot 100 chart.)	46	1	—	—	Face the Music
"Make Love" (Faith Evans featuring Keke Wyatt)	2015	—	—	—	—	—	Incomparable
"Heaven" (Sir the Baptist featuring Donald Lawrence & Co., KeKe Wyatt and ChurchPpl)	2018	—	—	—	16	—	Saint or Sinner
"Bless Somebody Else (Dorothy's Song)" (Kurt Carr featuring The Kurt Carr Singers & Friends)	2019	—	—	—	—	12	Bless Somebody Else
"—" denotes releases that did not chart or were not released in that territory.

== Soundtrack appearances ==
Year	Song	Film
2001	"It's Going Down" (with Blackalicious)	Brown Sugar
2002	"If Only You Knew"	Two Can Play That Game
2004	"Your Precious Love" (with Avant)	Barbershop 2

== Music videos ==
=== As lead artist ===
Title	Year	Artist(s)	Ref.
"Used to Love"	2001	Keke Wyatt	
"Nothing in This World"	2002	Keke Wyatt featuring Avant	
"I Don't Wanna"	2002	Keke Wyatt	
"Put Your Hands on Me"	2005	Keke Wyatt	
"Who Knew?"	2010	Keke Wyatt	
"Saturday Love"	2011	Keke Wyatt featuring Ruben Studdard	
"Fall in Love"	2014	Keke Wyatt	
"Lie Under You"	2015	Keke Wyatt	
"Sexy Song"	2016	Keke Wyatt	
"Jodeci"	2016	Keke Wyatt	

=== As featured artist ===
Title	Year	Artist(s)	Ref.
"My First Love"	2000	Avant featuring Keke Wyatt	
"You & I"	2013	Avant featuring Keke Wyatt	
"Make Love"	2015	Faith Evans featuring Keke Wyatt	

== See also ==
- List of songs recorded by Keke Wyatt
