= List of songs recorded by Keke Wyatt =

Keke Wyatt (born Ke'Tara Shavon Wyatt) is an American R&B recording artist. She has written and recorded material for her four studio albums, Soul Sista (2001), Who Knew? (2010), Unbelievable (2011), Rated Love (2016) and one extended play Ke'Ke' (2014). Songs included in this list are from her studio albums, extended play as well as collaborations with other recording artists on duets and featured songs on their respective albums and the unreleased tracks during the recording process the unreleased albums Emotional Rollercoaster (2005) and Ghetto Rose (2007).

At age fifteen, Wyatt recorded "My First Love" with Avant which was released two years later, eventually becoming a single for his album My Thoughts (2000). Wyatt gained much notoriety for the remake of the 1980s ballad by Rene & Angela. Its success, remaining on the Top 10 for several weeks, resulted in a solo album contract with MCA Records. With the help of the late MCA Record executive Louil Silas, her friend and A&R Randy Jackson, whom she met at age twelve, and former Boyz II Men manager Quadri El Amin, Wyatt recorded her first album within two weeks time. Her first single, "Used to Love", became a moderate hit on the Hot R&B/Hip-Hop Singles & Tracks chart her follow-up single "Nothing in This World", her second duet with Avant, charted higher and became her first entry to the Billboard Hot 100 chart. Soul Sista (2001), was released as her debut album it made the Top 40 on the Billboard Hot 200. In 2002, Keke was featured on the 2001 soundtrack for Brown Sugar on a song called "It's Going Down" with Blackalicious the song was also the song was later featured on Blackalicious's second studio album Blazing Arrow (2002). Keke was also featured on the 2004 soundtrack for Barbershop 2: Back in Business on a song called "Your Precious Love" with Avant.

In 2010, Keke released her sophomore album Who Knew?. The album spawned one single, the title track "Who Knew?" failed to make impact on the Billboard Hot 100, however the single charted in the Top 40 on the Hot R&B/Hip-Hop Songs chart. In 2011, Keke released her third album, Unbelievable. The album's lead single "Saturday Love," (2011) which features Ruben Studdard failed to make impact on the Billboard Hot 100, however the single charted in the Top 40 on the Hot R&B/Hip-Hop Songs chart.

In 2012, Keke was featured on the song You & I with Avant for his seventh studio album Face the Music (2013). The song was a successful hit for the duo hitting the top spot on the Adult R&B Songs chart. Keke released her first EP, Ke'Ke', was released on May 6, 2014, through Aratek Entertainment. The lead single "Fall in Love" was released (2014) and charted in the Top 20 on the Hot R&B/Hip-Hop Songs chart. The second single "Lie Under You" (2014) failed to make impact on the Billboard Hot 100 and therefore failed to chart in the United States. In 2014, Keke featured on Faith Evans sixth studio album Incomparable on the track "Make Love" which was released as a single on June 9, 2015.

Keke released her fourth studio album, Rated Love, on April 22, 2016, through Aratek Entertainment. The lead single "Sexy Song" was released (2015) and failed to make impact on the Billboard Hot 100, however the single charted in the Top 30 on the Hot R&B/Hip-Hop Songs chart. The second single "Love Me" was released (2016) failed to make impact on the Billboard Hot 100 and therefore failed to chart in the United States. On October 13, 2016, it was announced "Jodeci" would be released as the album's third single on a new deluxe version of her album Rated Love on October 21, 2016.

== Released songs ==
Key
†	Indicates single release
‡	Indicates promotional single release

Song	Artist(s)	Writer(s)	Album(s)	Year	Ref.
"24 Hours"	Keke Wyatt	Keke Wyatt, Robert Erness	Rated Love	2016	
"Anything"	Keke Wyatt	Keke Wyatt, Robert Erness	Rated Love	2016	
"Another Lifetime"	Keke Wyatt	Unknown	Ke'Ke'	2014	
"Back to You"	Keke Wyatt	Unknown	Rated Love	2016	
"Bad Boy"	Keke Wyatt	Unknown	Soul Sista	2001	
"Call on Me"	Keke Wyatt	Unknown	Soul Sista	2001	
"Daydreaming"	Keke Wyatt	Theodore "Range" Bowen, Keke Wyatt	Who Knew?	2010	
"Don't Take Your Love"	Keke Wyatt	Unknown	Soul Sista	2001	
"Dumb Love"	Keke Wyatt	Brandon Hesson, Dominic “Dom” Gordon, Keke Wyatt, Shantee Taylor	Rated Love	2016	
"Enough"	Keke Wyatt	Unknown	Unbelievable	2011	
"Fall in Love" †	Keke Wyatt	Unknown	Ke'Ke'	2014	
"Getting It"	Keke Wyatt	A. Mobley, Keke Wyatt	Who Knew?	2010	
"Ghetto Rose" †	Keke Wyatt	Curt Schneider, Franne Golde and Kasia Livingston	Non-album single	2007	
"Got Me One (Good Man)"	Keke Wyatt	Durrell Babbs, Harvey Mason, Jr., Damon Thomas	Who Knew?	2010	
"His Eye Is on the Sparrow"	Keke Wyatt	Civilla D. Martin	Unbelievable	2011	
"I Can't Wait"	Keke Wyatt featuring Avant	Unknown	Soul Sista	2001	
"I Don't Wanna"	Keke Wyatt	Unknown	Soul Sista	2001	
"I Know"	Keke Wyatt	Wayne Wilson	Rated Love	2016	
"I Won't Complain"	Keke Wyatt	Unknown	Rated Love	2016	
"If I Had You"	Keke Wyatt	Brandon Hesson, Dominic “Dom” Gordon, Keke Wyatt, Shantee Taylor	Rated Love	2016	
"If It Ain't You"	Keke Wyatt	Brandon Hesson, Dominic “Dom” Gordon, Keke Wyatt, Shantee Taylor	Rated Love	2016	
"It's Going Down"	Blackalicious featuring Lateef the Truth Speaker and Keke Wyatt	Unknown	Blazing Arrow and Brown Sugar	2002	
"If Only You Knew"	Keke Wyatt	Cynthia Biggs, Dexter Wansel, Kenneth Gamble	Soul Sista	2001	
"It's Reigning"	Keke Wyatt	Robert Erness, Keke Wyatt	Rated Love	2016	
"Jodeci" †	Keke Wyatt	Unknown	Rated Love	2016	
"Lie Under You" †	Keke Wyatt	Unknown	Ke'Ke'	2014	
"Light Me Up"	Keke Wyatt	Unknown	Unbelievable	2011	
"Love Me" †	Keke Wyatt	Keke Wyatt, Brandon Hesson, Dominic “Dom” Gordon	Rated Love	2016	
"Love Reigns (Interlude)"	Keke Wyatt	Keke Wyatt	Rated Love	2016	
"Love Under New Management"	Keke Wyatt	Unknown	Unbelievable	2011	
"Make It Work (Interlude)"	Keke Wyatt	Keke Wyatt	Rated Love	2016	
"Make Love" †	Faith Evans featuring Keke Wyatt	Faith Evans, Lamar Edwards, Michael Ray Cox, Jr., John Wesley Groover, Ketara Wyatt, Toni Coleman, Corey Marks	Incomparable	2015	
"Mirror"	Keke Wyatt featuring Kelly Price and Tweet	Unknown	Unbelievable	2011	
"Miss Your Plane"	Keke Wyatt	Unknown	Unbelievable	2011	
"My First Love" †	Avant featuring Keke Wyatt	Rene Moore, Angela Winbush	My Thoughts	2000	
"Never Do It Again"	Keke Wyatt	Harvey Mason, Jr., Steven Russell, Damon Thomas	Who Knew?	2010	
"Never Give Up"	Keke Wyatt	Steve Huff, Keke Wyatt	Who Knew?	2010	
"No Peace"	Keke Wyatt	Brandon Hesson, Dominic “Dom” Gordon, Keke Wyatt, Shantee Taylor	Rated Love	2016	
"Nothing in This World" †	Keke Wyatt featuring Avant	Steve 'Stone' Huff	Soul Sista	2001	
"On Repeat"	Keke Wyatt	Brandon Hesson, Dominic "Dom"Gordon, Jenny Karr, Keke Wyatt, Kyle Christopher, Shantee Taylor	Rated Love	2016	
"Peace on Earth"	Keke Wyatt	Rachelle Ferrell	Who Knew?	2010	
"Push Me Away"	Keke Wyatt	Unknown	Soul Sista	2001	
"Put Your Hands on Me" †	Keke Wyatt	Allan Felder, Balewa Muhammad, Keke Wyatt, Steve Morales, Norman Harris	Emotional Rollercoaster	2004	
"Rain"	Keke Wyatt featuring Pusha T	Unknown	Ke'Ke'	2014	
"Red Light"	Keke Wyatt	Unknown	Rated Love	2016	
"Remember"	Keke Wyatt featuring Nitty Scott, MC	Unknown	Ke'Ke'	2014	
"Saturday Love" †	Keke Wyatt featuring Ruben Studdard	Jimmy Jam & Terry Lewis	Unbelievable	2011	
"Sexy Song †	Keke Wyatt	Ketara "Keke" Wyatt, Brandon Hesson, Peter Penn	Rated Love	2015	
"So Confused"	Keke Wyatt	Unknown	Who Knew?	2010	
"Talkin 'Bout Love"	Keke Wyatt	Unknown	Soul Sista	2001	
"Tap Out"	Keke Wyatt	Unknown	Unbelievable	2011	
"Tears in Heaven"	Keke Wyatt	Eric Clapton, Will Jennings	Unbelievable	2011	
"Things Change (Interlude)"	Keke Wyatt	Keke Wyatt	Rated Love	2016	
"Travel the World (Love Uses Time)"	Keke Wyatt	Unknown	Unbelievable	2011	
"Used to Love" †	Keke Wyatt	Steve 'Stone' Huff	Soul Sista	2001	
"Unbelievable"	Keke Wyatt	Unknown	Unbelievable	2011	
"Weakest"	Keke Wyatt	Harvey Mason, Jr., Kevin Randolph	Who Knew?	2010	
"Who Knew?" †	Keke Wyatt	Durrell Babbs, Eric Dawkins, Antonio Dixon, Harvey Mason, Jr., Steven Russell, Damon Thomas	Who Knew?	2010	
"Without You"	Keke Wyatt	Ketara "Keke" Wyatt	Who Knew?	2010	
"You & I †	Avant featuring Keke Wyatt	Kriss "Kajun" Johnson, Myron Avant, Andre Henry	Face the Music	2012	
"Your Precious Love"	Avant featuring Keke Wyatt	Unknown	Barbershop 2: Back in Business	2004	

== Unreleased songs ==
Many officially unreleased Keke Wyatt songs have been scheduled, at one point, for release on records by the singer, including her two unreleased studio albums with her former music labels TVT Records and Cash Money Records: Emotional Rollercoaster (2004) and Ghetto Rose (2007). For varying reasons, the tracks were ultimately rejected or shelved. As of 2016, the songs remain either completely unreleased or have been leaked onto the internet and mixtapes without gaining an official release. The singer's unreleased material includes songs recorded by Wyatt as a solo artist. Eleven tracks that were recorded for Emotional Rollercoaster were leaked in 2009.

Song	Artist(s)	Writer(s)	Originating album	Leak	Ref.
"Cheaters" (Note: "Cheaters" was leaked onto YouTube on December 11, 2009.)	Keke Wyatt	Unknown	Emotional Rollercoaster	Yes	
"Emotional Rollercoaster"	Keke Wyatt featuring Ginuwine	Unknown	Emotional Rollercoaster	No	
"Getting It" (Note: "Getting It" was leaked onto YouTube on December 6, 2009. It was later included on the album "Who Knew?" in 2010.)	Keke Wyatt	A. Mobley, Keke Wyatt	Emotional Rollercoaster	Yes	
"Inspiration" (Note: "Inspiration" was leaked on August 11, 2009.)	Keke Wyatt	Unknown	Emotional Rollercoaster	Yes	
"Peace on Earth" (Note: "Peace on Earth" was leaked on YouTube on December 11, 2009. It was later included on the album "Who Knew?" in 2010.)	Keke Wyatt	Rachelle Ferrell	Emotional Rollercoaster	Yes	
"Shining" (Note: "Shining" was leaked on August 11, 2009.)	Keke Wyatt	Unknown	Emotional Rollercoaster	Yes	
"This That And The Third" (Note: "This That And The Third" was leaked on August 11, 2009.)	Keke Wyatt	Unknown	Emotional Rollercoaster	Yes	

== See also ==
- Keke Wyatt discography
