= Cherrelle discography =

- Studio albums: 5
- Singles: 20

American singer Cherrelle has released five studio albums and twenty singles.

== Discography ==
=== Studio albums ===
Year	Title	Peak chart positions					Record label
Year	Title	US	US R&B	GER	NZ	UK	Record label
1984	Fragile	144	27	—	—	—	Tabu
1985	High Priority	36	9	65	32	17	Tabu
1988	Affair	106	15	—	—	—	Tabu
1991	The Woman I Am	—	43	—	—	—	Tabu
1999	The Right Time	—	55	—	—	—	Power
"—" denotes a recording that did not chart or was not released in that territory.

=== Compilation albums ===
- The Best of Cherrelle (1995, Tabu)
- Greatest Hits (2005, Tabu)
- Icon (2011, Tabu)

=== Singles ===
Year	Title	Peak chart positions									Album
Year	Title	US	US R&B	US Dan	BEL	GER	IRE	NLD	NZ	UK	Album
1984	"I Didn't Mean to Turn You On"	79	8	6	—	—	—	—	—	111	Fragile
1984	"Fragile… Handle with Care"	—	37	—	—	—	—	—	—	145	Fragile
1984	"Like I Will (Tokyo Mix)"	—	—	—	—	—	—	—	—	—	Fragile
1985	"You Look Good to Me"	—	26	—	—	—	—	—	—	—	High Priority
1985	"Saturday Love" (with Alexander O'Neal)	26	2	13	—	—	7	—	4	6	High Priority
1986	"Will You Satisfy?"	—	—	—	—	—	—	—	—	57	High Priority
1986	"Artificial Heart" (A-Side)	—	18	5	—	—	—	—	41	—	High Priority
1986	"Oh No It's U Again" (B-Side)	—	—	5	—	—	—	—	—	—	High Priority
1988	"Never Knew Love Like This" (with Alexander O'Neal)	28	2	—	24	49	—	24	—	26	Hearsay (by Alexander O'Neal)
1988	"Everything I Miss at Home"	—	1	—	—	—	—	—	—	83	Affair
1989	"Affair"	—	4	15	—	—	—	—	—	67	Affair
1989	"What More Can I Do for You"	—	58	—	—	—	—	—	—	—	Affair
1989	"Crazy (For Loving You)"	—	—	—	—	—	—	—	—	—	Affair
1990	"Saturday Love (Feelin' Luv Mix)" (with Alexander O'Neal)	—	—	—	—	—	—	—	—	55	Non-album single
1991	"Never in My Life"	—	40	—	—	—	—	—	—	—	The Woman I Am
1992	"Tears of Joy"	—	23	—	—	—	—	—	—	100	The Woman I Am
1992	"Still in Love with You"	—	86	—	—	—	—	—	—	—	The Woman I Am
1997	"Baby, Come to Me" (with Alexander O'Neal)	—	28	—	—	—	—	—	—	56	The Right Time
1999	"The Right Time"	—	—	—	—	—	—	—	—	—	The Right Time
1999	"Just Tell Me"	—	122	—	—	—	—	—	—	—	The Right Time
"—" denotes a recording that did not chart or was not released in that territory.
