= R&B Divas =

R&B Divas may refer to:

- R&B Divas: Atlanta, which was originally named R&B Divas

- R&B Divas: Los Angeles, a spin-off

- R&B Divas (album), an album led by American recording artist Faith Evans, produced in conjunction with the television series.
