= Dumb (Faith Evans song) =

Single by Faith Evans

from the album R&B Divas
- Released: August 28, 2012
- Recorded: 2011–2012
- Genre: R&B; disco; dance-pop
- Label: Prolific Music; E1 Music
- Songwriters: Christian Arlester; Chris "Brody" Brown; Toni Coleman; Achia Dixon; Larrance Dopson; Lamar Edwards; Faith Evans; Camille Hooper; Jaila Simms
- Producers: 1500 or Nothin'; Faith Evans (co-producer)

Faith Evans singles chronology
| "Tears of Joy" (2012) | "Dumb" (2012) | "I Deserve It" (2014) |

"Dumb" is a song by American R&B recording artist Faith Evans, recorded for R&B Divas (2012), a compilation album led by Evans which featured the first season stars of the same-titled TV One reality series. It was written by Evans along with Chris "Brody" Brown, Toni Coleman, Achia Dixon, Larrance Dopson, Lamar Edwards, Camille Hooper, and Jaila Simms, incorporating a sample from the composition "Broadway Combination", penned by Christian Arlester for his band Dyke and the Blazers. Production on "Dumb" was handled by music production team 1500 or Nothin', featuring additional production by Evans.

The retro soul track was released as the compilation album's second single following Evans-led lead single "Tears of Joy". A music video for "Dumb" was photographed by Bishop Moore and features Evans singing and dancing in a 1970s-themed clip.

== Music video ==
A music video for "Dumb" was Directed by Bishop Moore. In the ’70s-themed clip, Evans jams with her band and sits atop a candy red Ford Mustang.

== Credits and personnel ==
Credits adapted from the liner notes of R&B Divas.

- Production – 1500 or Nothin'
- Co–production, vocal production – Faith Evans
- Additional vocals – Fizzy Gillespie & The Fayettes
- Mixing – Tony Maserati
- Mixing assistance – Christopher Tabron
- Recording – Ben Briggs III
- Mastering – Herb Powers

== Charts ==
| Chart (2012) | Peak position |
|---|---|
| South Korea (Gaon Chart) | 65 |
