= Tears of Joy (song) =

Single by Faith Evans

from the album R&B Divas
- Released: August 20, 2012
- Length: 3:53
- Label: Prolific; E1
- Songwriters: Chuck Harmony; Claude Kelly
- Producers: Chuck Harmony; Claude Kelly

Faith Evans singles chronology
"Lovin' Me (R&B Divas Theme)" (2012)	"Tears of Joy" (2012)	"Dumb" (2012)

"Tears of Joy" is a song by American recording artist Faith Evans. It was written and produced by Claude Kelly and Chuck Harmony and recorded by Evans for R&B Divas (2012), a compilation album led by the singer which featured the first season stars of the same-titled TV One reality series. An emotional piano-led R&B ballad, the song was released as the album's first single and peaked at 79 on the US Billboard R&B/Hip-Hop Songs and number 18 on Billboard's R&B Songs chart.

== Background ==
"Tears of Joy" was composed and produced by Claude Kelly and Chuck Harmony. Evans described the song as "a great timeless R&B record" which puts her "in the mind of Gladys Knight meets Aretha Franklin.” In an interview with CBS Local, she further elaborated that it took social networking service Twitter for her to arrange a collaboration with Kelly. In fact, it was "Kelly who tweeted months ago: ‘Somebody tell Faith Evans I love her I want to work with her’,” she explained. “Two weeks later, we were in the studio and he played me this song and I’m like, 'Oh my god this is amazing I need this record'.” Speaking of its Grammy appeal, Evans commented, "Normally I wouldn’t say this, but I think I should be nominated. It feels funny saying that about myself. But my first single is just one of those songs. If I’m not nominated, the song writer Claude Kelly should be."

== Critical reception ==
Mark Edward Nero from About.com was impressed with the song. He wrote that "Tears of Joy" was "a soaring reflection on how a good, positive relationship is truly something to be celebrated. The song [...] is a reminder of how great a singer Faith can be when she's fully engaged in her work and not just going through the motions, like she's done at times in the past!. SoulCulture found that Evans' "voice sounds pretty damn divine on “Tears of Joy” – a soul-filled, emotional piano-led ballad."

== Music video ==
The music video for "Tears of Joy" was directed by Erik White and filmed on September 25, 2012 in Los Angeles, California. Shot by the ocean, the black-and-white clip portrsys lovers of all ages and races. The video premiered online on October 5, 2012. Actor Lamman Rucker appeared in the video as Evans' love interest.

== Charts ==
=== Weekly charts ===
Weekly chart performance for "Tears of Joy"
Chart (2012–2013)	Peak position
South Korea International (Circle)	95
US Adult R&B Songs (Billboard)	4
US Hot R&B/Hip-Hop Songs (Billboard)	79

=== Year-end charts ===
Year-end chart performance for "Tears of Joy"
Chart (2012)	Position
US Adult R&B Songs (Billboard)	18

== Release history ==
"Tears of Joy" release history
Region	Date	Format(s)	Label	Ref.
Various	August 20, 2012	Digital download; streaming	Prolific; E1	
