= You & I (Avant song) =

Single by Avant featuring Keke Wyatt

from the album Face the Music
- Released: August 2012
- Recorded: 2012
- Genre: R&B, Soul
- Length: 3:54
- Label: MO-B Entertainment
- Songwriters: Kriss "Kajun" Johnson, Myron Avant, Andre Henry
- Producer: Kajun

Avant singles chronology
"Your Body is the Business" (2011)	"You & I" (2012)	"More" (2013)

KeKe Wyatt singles chronology
"Saturday Love" (2011)	"You & I" (2012)	"Fall in Love" (2014)

Music video
- "You & I" on Youtube.com

"You & I" is the lead single by American R&B singer Avant featuring American R&B singer KeKe Wyatt taken from the seventh studio album Face the Music (2013). The song was released in August 2012 through MO-B Entertainment. The song was written by Kriss "Kajun" Johnson, Myron Avant and Andre Henry. The song marks Avant and KeKe's fifth collaboration "My First Love" (2000), "Nothing in This World", "I Can't Wait" (2001) and "Your Precious Love" (2004).

The song failed to make impact on the Billboard Hot 100, however the single peaked at number one on the Adult R&B Songs chart.

== Critical response ==
The song was met with a positive response from critics and journalists.

In a review from DJBooth stated "If you like love, then you’ll love Avant‘s latest feature. On album lead single You & I the MO-B Entertainment/EMI singer reaches out to a special woman in his life, assuring her that not only that he loves her, but that he loves loving her and, presumably, loves loving loving her. And KeKe Wyatt, his partner on this heartwarming duet? As she makes clear over a currently unknown producer’s slow-jam boardwork, she loves him, and loves loving him, right back."

YouKnowIGotSoul stated in a review of the album Face the Music, "You and I teams Avant with his longtime cohort KeKe Wyatt and, as usual, they’re magic together. Avant and KeKe continue to smolder every time they connect." Elle Breezy from Singersroom stated in a review "Might as well coin them the modern day Marvin Gaye and Tammy Terrell, because the chemistry that Avant and KeKe Wyatt share behind the mic is crazy! The longtime-duet partners are back with another gem in You & I."

== Music video ==
The music video was released to Avant's VEVO channel on January 4, 2013. Directed by Kai Crawford, was intended to highlight the chemistry and performance of both Avant and KeKe as they reunite in the first time to perform in six years.

Avant described the song and video in a behind the scenes video of the song as "What were really trying to do is bring back that old true R&B back. You know back in the days you would see black and white just amazing performance. What were gonna do is have the black and white look but with some colour."

== Track listings and formats ==
Digital download

- "You & I" (feat. KeKe Wyatt) – 3:54

== Commercial performance ==
On December 1, 2012, the song peaked at number forty six on Billboard's Hot R&B/Hip-Hop Songs chart. The song debuted on Billboard's Adult R&B Songs chart at number twenty three later rising to number one on March 2, 2013 in its twenty third week. The song also peaked at number seventeen on the R&B/Hip-Hop Airplay chart. The song peaked at number 75 on Billboard's Radio Songs chart.

== Charts ==
Chart (2012–2013)	Peak position
US Bubbling Under Hot 100 (Billboard)	23
US Adult R&B Songs (Billboard)	1
US R&B/Hip-Hop Airplay (Billboard)	17
