= I Deserve It =

Single by Faith Evans featuring Missy Elliott and Sharaya J

from the album Incomparable
- Released: June 25, 2014
- Length: 3:40
- Label: Prolific; BMG
- Songwriters: Faith Evans; Carl Thompson; Andre Johnson; Chyna Griffin; Toni Coleman; Achaia Dixon; Melissa Elliott; Sharaya Howell; Nina Simone; Weldon Irvine
- Producers: Chucky Thompson; Andre "AJ" Johnson; Faith Evans

Faith Evans singles chronology
"Dumb" (2012)	"I Deserve It" (2014)	"Make Love" (2015)

Missy Elliott singles chronology
"Without Me" (2013)	"I Deserve It" (2014)	"WTF (Where They From)" (2015)

Sharaya J singles chronology
"Smash Up the Place" (2013)	"I Deserve It" (2014)	"Takin' It No More" (2014)

Music video
- "I Deserve It" on YouTube

"I Deserve It" is a song by American singer Faith Evans, featuring female hip-hop recording artists Missy Elliott and her protégé Sharaya J, from Evans' sixth studio album, Incomparable (2014). It was written by Evans, Elliott und Sharaya J along with Chucky Thompson, Andre Johnson, Toni Coleman, Achaia Dixon and Evans' daughter Chyna Griffin and samples Aretha Franklin's cover of Nina Simone's "To Be Young, Gifted and Black" (1969), as well as an interpolation of "Whatta Man" by Salt-N-Pepa featuring En Vogue. Due to the sample, Simone and co-writer are also Weldon Irvine credited as songwriters on "I Deserve It".

The song was released via Evans' official SoundCloud account on June 25, 2014, and went on to be officially released in Russia and North America via iTunes on August 25, 2014. Released to generally favorable reviews with critics, it reached the top 20 of the US Adult R&B Songs chart in January 2015. "I Deserve It" marked the second time that both Evans and Elliott appeared on a release together, the first being Evans' remixed single "Burnin' Up" in 2002.

== Background ==
On August 6, 2013, Faith Evans confirmed in an interview with Studio Q that Missy Elliott would be one of the guest appearances on her sixth album Incomparable. In February 2014, Elliott herself confirmed that she would be featured on Evans' album. On March 14, 2014, Evans added that Elliott had contributed three tracks for the project and noted that one of them ("I Deserve It") happened to be "the last song on [the] album" that she recorded vocals for. Evans also added that "I Deserve It" would feature Elliott's protégée Sharaya J and "declared" the song as a "perfect embodiment of being able to still maintain what people know you for and the era that you’re from — but not sound dated."

Elaborating further on Missy Elliott's contribution to the single, Faith Evans disclosed: "When I first sent Missy [Elliott] the record, she was like, 'I don't know how to attack it,' and I'm like 'Girl bye' [...] Like, Missy do what you do. But she tried two other songs and went back to that one like, 'I like this one'." On June 15, 2014, Evans began a ten-day countdown for the single via her official Instagram account, and confirmed that the record would be released on June 25, 2014.

== Composition ==
"I Deserve It" is a summertime R&B ladies' feel-good anthem that features "a piano and horn-driven beat", which samples Nina Simone's 1972 recording, "To Be Young, Gifted and Black". The song narrates Evans' praise of herself as she "vows not to settle when it comes to a man." Prior to the song's release, interviewers asked if the production to "I Deserve It" would be set in a mid-tempo or up-tempo style; Faith Evans replied that the song would be a "banger" and a "feel good" record.

== Critical reception ==
The song has received generally favorable reviews with critics praising the track for being a "feel good" record laced with "summertime vibes". Zach Frydenlund of Complex praised "I Deserve It" for being an "R&B feel-good anthem that will brighten up your morning." Asada Nicome of The Source named the record a "catchy R&B [tune], that will have you bouncing and nodding your head". Rich Terell of Examiner took note of Evans' approach for accumulating the attention of a much younger generation. Terell also praised Evans for "snatching wigs first and asking questions later," with the release of "I Deserve It", which was described by Terell as a "summer-smash". Julian Riedel of German magazine Ampya complimented the single's motto, "make it hot for the summer", and praised the song's production as "classic, timeless mid-tempo R&B" intertwined "with an airy piano-strumming" instrumental coupled with "the typical Missy [Elliott] touch." Riedel also described Faith Evans' vocals as "smoky-sweet soprano" and noted "I Deserve It" as a "self-empower[ing] anthem".

Critics also applauded Missy Elliott's guest appearance on the record, with Rap-Up noting Elliott "channel[ing] Salt-N-Pepa on her electrifying verse," and Frydenlund praising Elliott for "[going] in on her verse," and "reiterat[ing] the fact that [Elliott] hasn't lost a step." DirectLyrics jokingly wrote, "Where's my oxygen mask? I'm hyperventilating," in response to Elliott's guest appearance on the record. DirectLyrics also praised both Elliott and Sharaya J for "add[ing] a nice flavor thanks to their upbeat rap verses." Additionally, the song and accompanying music video met favorable reception from musicians like Leondre Devries of teen boy band Bars and Melody, where he stated via YouTube that he "really loved" the record and branded Evans as being "dope".

== Chart performance ==
On June 25, 2014, "I Deserve It" peaked at number one on Billboard Trending 140 chart, less than 10 hours after its premiere on Evans' official SoundCloud account. While it failed to chart on the US Billboard Hot 100 or the Hot R&B/Hip-Hop Songs chart, the song peaked at number 19 on the Adult R&B Songs chart in the week of January 17, 2015.

== Music video ==
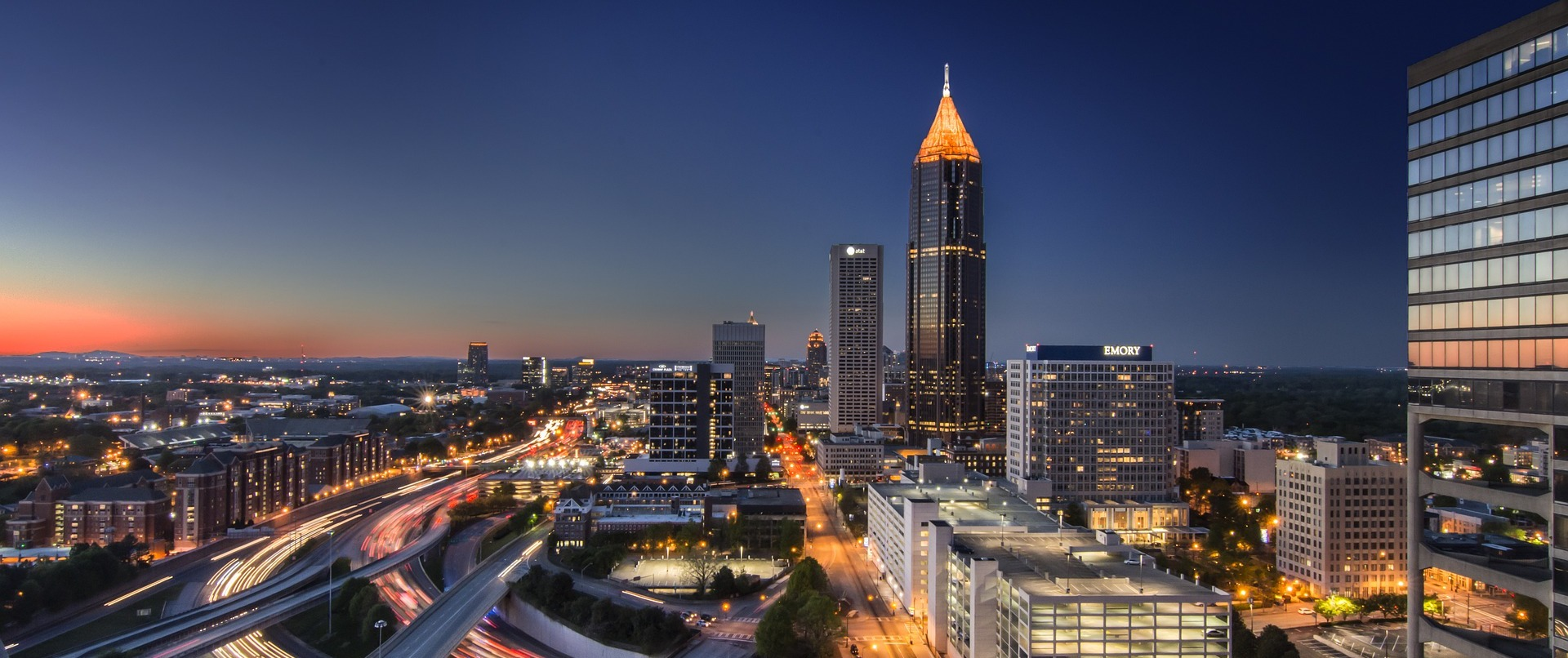
The music video for "I Deserve It" was filmed at Suite Lounge in Atlanta, Georgia in August 2014.

Shooting for the music video began sometime in early August 2014 and took place at Suite Lounge in Atlanta, Georgia. Directed by Derek Blanks and produced by Radiant3 Productions, the music video features choreographic dancing by Lisa Cunningham ("Icy", "Taurus Here") and club references to the Eddie Murphy film Coming to America (1988). The video also features cameo appearances by the likes of Stevie J, Joseline Hernandez, Terrell Owens and Evans' friend and R&B Divas co-star KeKe Wyatt. On August 31, 2014, a sneak peek of the music video was released via Evans' official YouTube channel. The full-length video premiered on VH1 on September 10, 2014.

== Charts ==
Weekly chart performance for "I Deserve It"
Chart (2014)	Peak position
US Adult R&B Songs (Billboard)	19

== Release history ==
"I Deserve It" release history
Region	Date	Format(s)	Label	Ref.
United States	June 25, 2014	SoundCloud premiere	Prolific; BMG	
United States	August 25, 2014	Digital download; streaming	Prolific; BMG	
Russia	August 25, 2014	Digital download; streaming	Prolific; BMG	
