= Put Your Hands on Me (song) =

Single by Keke Wyatt

from the album Emotional Rollercoaster
- Released: May 31, 2005
- Recorded: 2004–2005
- Genre: R&B
- Length: 4:11
- Label: Cash Money Records; Universal Records
- Songwriters: Allan Felder; Balewa Muhammad; Keke Wyatt; Norman Harris; Steve Morales
- Producer: Steve "Rockstar" Morales

Keke Wyatt singles chronology
"I Don't Wanna" (2002)	"Put Your Hands on Me" (2005)	"Ghetto Rose" (2007)

"Put Your Hands On Me" is a song recorded by American R&B singer Keke Wyatt serving as the first single from her unreleased second studio album "Emotional Rollercoaster" (2005) through Cash Money Records and Universal Records on May 31, 2005. The song was written by Allan Felder, Balewa Muhammad, Keke Wyatt, Steve Morales and Norman Harris and produced by Steve Morales.

== Background ==
Her solo debut in 2001, Soul Sista, was released on November 13, 2001 by MCA Records. The album was certified gold by the Recording Industry Association of America (RIAA) for a shipments of 500,000 copies in the United States. In 2002, her rendition of "Nothing in This World" led to a nomination for Best New R&B/Soul/Rap Artist at the Soul Train Lady of Soul Awards. By 2004, Wyatt had departed from MCA Records. She signed a contract, negotiated by her ex-husband/road manager Rahmat Morton, with Cash Money Records/Universal Motown Records, under the management of Cassandra Ware. Her second album Emotional Rollercoaster was originally set for release on May 31, 2005, but was postponed for release in early 2006. In 2006, Wyatt was released from her contract with Cash Money Records, citing conflict with management as the reason for her departure.

== Music video ==
A music video for "Put Your Hands on Me" was released in 2005. On April 30, 2007, the music video was made available on Dailymotion.

== Track listings and formats ==
Digital Download

1. "Put Your Hands On Me" (Radio Edit) – 4:11

Vinyl

1. "Put Your Hands On Me" (Radio Edit) - 4:11
2. "Put Your Hands On Me" (Instrumental) - 4:10
3. "Put Your Hands On Me" (TV Track) - 4:10
4. "Put Your Hands On Me" (Acapella) - 3:42

== Release history ==
Region	Date	Format	Label	Ref
United States	May 31, 2005	Digital download	Cash Money Records	
United States	July 12, 2005	Vinyl	Cash Money Records	
