= Push Me Away =

Push Me Away may refer to:

- "Push Me Away" (Keke Wyatt song), 2001
- "Push Me Away" (Kutless song), 2006
- "Push Me Away" (The Jacksons song), 1978
