= Used to Love =

Used to Love may refer to:

- "Used to Love" (Keke Wyatt song), released in 2001
- "Used to Love" (Martin Garrix and Dean Lewis song), released in 2019

== See also ==
- Used to Love You (disambiguation)
