= Emotional Rollercoaster =

Emotional Rollercoaster may refer to:

- "Emotional Rollercoaster" (song), a 2002 song by Vivian Green
- Emotional Rollercoaster (Maria Lawson album)
- Emotional Rollercoaster (Keke Wyatt album)
