= Keke Covers =

Studio album by Keke Wyatt
- Released: February 14, 2017
- Recorded: 2016–2017
- Length: 37:45
- Label: Aratek Entertainment

Keke Wyatt chronology
Rated Love (2016)	Keke Covers (2017)	Certified (2024)

Keke Covers is cover album by American R&B recording artist Keke Wyatt. It was released on February 14, 2017, through Aratek Entertainment.

The album features covers from Rose Royce, Beyoncé, Jeremih, Prince and The New Power Generation, Rihanna, Zayn, Whitney Houston's cover of "I Will Always Love You", Calvin Harris, Marvin Gaye and Chris Stapleton.

== Background and release ==
After the success of the lead single "Sexy Song", taken from her fourth studio album Rated Love, Wyatt uploaded a cover music video of Mary J. Blige's version of "I'm Goin' Down" to her YouTube channel, announcing a series of covers titled "Keke Covers" on January 28, 2016. On February 2, 2016, on the fourth anniversary of Whitney Houston's death, Wyatt released the second video in the series, covering "I Will Always Love You". On March 1, 2016, a cover of Beyoncé's "Love On Top" was released. It was followed on March 15 by her version of "Diamonds" by Rihanna.

On April 12, 2016, Wyatt released a cover of Jeremih's "Oui"; a remix version featuring both Wyatt and Jeremih's vocals was uploaded on May 16. Following the death of Prince, she paid tribute by releasing "Diamonds and Pearls" on May 2. This was followed by covers of Zayn's "Pillowtalk" on May 31; "Tennessee Whiskey" by Chris Stapleton (originally by David Allan Coe) on June 29; and Marvin Gaye's "What's Going On", featuring her brother Keever West, on July 27. On February 14, 2017, she released her covers album via iTunes, Amazon, Google Play, Spotify and Tidal. A music video for "This Is What You Came For" was uploaded to Wyatt's YouTube channel on the day of the album's release.

== Track listing ==
Keke Covers — Standard edition
No.	Title	Writer(s)	Original artist	Length
1.	"I'm Goin' Down"	Norman Whitfield	Rose Royce	1:58
2.	"Love On Top"	Beyoncé Knowles; Terius Nash; Shea Taylor	Beyoncé	3:18
3.	"Oui"	Jeremih Felton; Khari Cain; Brandon Bell; Carl Martin	Jeremih	4:16
4.	"Diamonds and Pearls"	Prince	Prince and The New Power Generation	4:30
5.	"Diamonds"	Sia Furler; Benjamin Levin; Mikkel Eriksen; Tor Hermansen	Rihanna	3:47
6.	"Pillowtalk"	Zayn; Levi Lennox; Anthony Hannides; Michael Hannides; Joe Garrett	Zayn	3:27
7.	"I Will Always Love You"	Dolly Parton	Whitney Houston	4:44
8.	"This Is What You Came For"	Calvin Harris; Taylor Swift	Calvin Harris featuring Rihanna	3:43
9.	"What's Going On (feat. Keever West)"	Al Cleveland; Renaldo Benson; Marvin Gaye	Marvin Gaye	3:37
10.	"Tennessee Whiskey"	Dean Dillon; Linda Hargrove	Chris Stapleton	4:25
Total length:				37:45

== Release history ==
Region	Date	Format	Label	Ref
Worldwide	February 14, 2017	Digital download	Aratek Entertainment	
