= Everything I Miss at Home =

Single by Cherrelle

from the album Affair
- B-side: "Where Do I Run To"
- Released: 1988
- Recorded: 1987
- Genre: R&B; soul
- Length: 3:55
- Label: Tabu
- Songwriters: James Harris III; Terry Lewis
- Producer: Jimmy Jam & Terry Lewis

Cherrelle singles chronology
"Never Knew Love Like This" (1988)	"Everything I Miss at Home" (1988)	"Affair" (1989)

"Everything I Miss at Home" is a song by American R&B singer-songwriter, Cherrelle, from her third studio album, Affair (1988). Released in 1988 as the lead single off the album, the single became one of the most successful of her career, peaking at number-one on the Billboard Hot R&B Songs chart for one week. Unlike previous Cherrelle releases, "Everything I Miss at Home" did not chart on the US Hot 100. Alexander O’Neal is on backing vocals.

== Track listing and formats ==
- US 7" Vinyl

A "Everything I Miss at Home" – 3:55
B "Where Do I Run To" – 3:40

- UK 12" Vinyl

A1 "Everything I Miss at Home" – 3:55
A2 "Where Do I Run To" – 3:40
B "Saturday Love" (Extended Version) – 8:45

- US Cassette
1. "Everything I Miss at Home" – 3:55
2. "Where Do I Run To" – 3:40

== Charts ==
Chart (1988)	Peak position
UK Singles (OCC)	83
US Hot R&B/Hip-Hop Songs (Billboard)	1
