= Affair (album) =

Studio album by Cherrelle
- Released: October 19, 1988
- Studio: Flyte Tyme (Minneapolis)
- Genres: R&B; pop rock; new jack swing
- Length: 50:32
- Label: Tabu
- Producers: Jimmy Jam & Terry Lewis; Cherrelle; Steve Hodge & Randy Ran

Cherrelle chronology
High Priority (1985)	Affair (1988)	The Woman I Am (1991)

Singles from Affair
- 1. "Everything I Miss at Home" Released: September 1988; 2. "Affair" Released: 1989; 3. "What More Can I Do for You" Released: 1989

Affair is the third studio album by American singer Cherrelle. Released on October 19, 1988, by Tabu Records, It reached #15 on the Top R&B/Hip-Hop Albums chart; and #106 on Billboard Top 200. It spawned the #1 R&B hit "Everything I Miss at Home," which is Cherrelle's only number one on that chart to date. It would also be her last album with long-time producers Jimmy Jam & Terry Lewis.

== Background ==
Cherrelle had recorded two albums previous to this: Fragile (1984) and High Priority (1985). Both albums had been predominantly produced by Jimmy Jam & Terry Lewis, and this third effort was no different. After the success of labelmate and frequent duet partner Alexander O'Neal's 1987 concept album Hearsay, it was decided that Cherrelle's latest album would also follow a concept, this time one of a romantic relationship that had soured. Cherrelle would also have co-writing and co-production input on the album for the tracks: "My Friend," "Crazy (For Loving You)" and "Lucky."

== Reception ==
Professional ratings
Review scores
Source	Rating
Allmusic	3/5 stars

The soulfully introspective lead single from the album, "Everything I Miss at Home" was very popular and paved the way for the album's success. The follow-up single was the up-tempo title track "Affair," which peaked at #4 on the Hot R&B/Hip-Hop Songs chart in early 1989. The album's third and final single "What More Can I Do For You," which had a similar sound to the then upcoming Janet Jackson's Rhythm Nation 1814 would only chart modestly, peaking at #58 on the R&B chart.

"Discreet" contains snippets of the conversation that was sampled from the intro to Alexander O'Neal's song "Hearsay" as well as Alexander's voice heard singing "spreading on my name" of the latter.

== Track listing ==
No.	Title	Writer(s)	Length
1.	"Looks Aren't Everything"	James Harris III; Terry Lewis	4:28
2.	"Pick Me Up"	Harris; Lewis	4:19
3.	"Discreet"	Harris; Lewis	4:08
4.	"Happy That You're Happy With Me"	Harris; Lewis	3:39
5.	"Affair"	Harris; Lewis	3:14
6.	"What More Can I Do For You"	Harris; Lewis	4:36
7.	"Foolin' Around"	Harris; Lewis	4:27
8.	"Everything I Miss at Home"	Harris; Lewis	3:56
9.	"Keep It Inside" (featuring Alexander O'Neal)	Harris; Lewis	4:15
10.	"My Friend"	Cherrelle Norton; Herman Davis; Mary Smettler	3:35
11.	"Crazy (For Loving You)"	Norton; Davis; Smettler	3:44
12.	"Lucky"	Norton; Davis; Smettler	5:04
13.	"Home" (reprise)	Harris; Lewis	1:06

== Charts ==
Chart (1988)	Peak position
US Billboard 200	106
US Top R&B/Hip-Hop Albums (Billboard)	15
