= Make Love (Faith Evans song) =

Single by Faith Evans featuring Keke Wyatt

from the album Incomparable
- Released: June 9, 2015
- Recorded: 2013–2014
- Genre: R&B
- Length: 6:47 (album version); 4:18 (video version); 4:06 (radio edit)
- Label: Prolific Music; BMG Rights Management
- Songwriter(s): Faith Evans; Lamar Edwards; Michael Ray Cox, Jr.; John Wesley Groover; Ketara Wyatt; Toni Coleman; Corey Marks
- Producer(s): Lamar "Mars" Edwards; The Futuristiks; Faith Evans

Faith Evans singles chronology
"I Deserve It" (2014)	"Make Love" (2015)	"Good Time" (2015)

Keke Wyatt singles chronology
"Fall in Love" (2014)	"Make Love" (2015)	"Sexy Song" (2015)

"Make Love" is the second single by American singer Faith Evans, featuring R&B singer Keke Wyatt, from Evans' sixth studio album, Incomparable (2014). The song was released on June 9, 2015 through Prolific Music and BMG Rights Management. The song was written by Faith Evans, Lamar "Mars" Edwards, Michael Ray Cox, Jr., John Wesley Groover, Ketara Wyatt, Toni Coleman and Corey Marks, and produced by Lamar Edwards, The Futuristiks and Faith Evans.

The song marks their second collaboration after "Lovin' Me" (R&B Divas Theme) (2012).

== Background and release ==
On February 18, 2015, it was announced on Evans' official website that the song was chosen as the next single from the album Incomparable: "#MakeLove is the second single from my new album Incomparable, available now on iTunes, Amazon, Google Music and other great retailers!"

== Critical reception ==
The song has received generally favorable reviews with critics. The Source reviewed the music video, saying "The R&B divas make no mistake in delivering quality vocals over these lusty lyrics. The record off of Evans' last album Incomparable is strictly grown and sexy." Raw Hollywood wrote "The singing ladies take it back with a traditional r&b vibe paired with their amazing vocals [which] makes it a track that is certainly timeless."

== Music video ==
On February 2, 2015, a radio edit audio video of the song was uploaded to Evans' YouTube account. On June 7, 2015, a 15-second teaser video was released to YouTube. On June 9, 2015, the music video was released to YouTube. The video was directed by Mecca Don Villain.

=== Response ===
Soul Train reviewed the video, stating "R&B Divas Faith Evans and Keke Wyatt go H.A.M. on the erotic meter. Faith rocks a bustier and high heels while performing seductive movements on a loveseat, and Keke brings out the whip and handcuff for a freaky sexcapade with her man." Centric TV stated "While Nicki Minaj and Beyonce are busy feeling themselves, Faith Evans and Keke Wyatt want someone else to handle that for them (insert: wink). The R&B divas have teamed up for a spicy video for Evans' latest single "Make Love" and after just a minute into the video, it's clear these ladies are ready to take it to the bedroom. (Get into Keke and that whip!)" The Source stated "R&B legends Faith Evans and Keke Wyatt bring sexy all the way back with the new visual for Make Love.""

== Formats and track listings ==
Digital download

- "Make Love" (feat. Keke Wyatt) – 6:47
