= Sexy Song =

Single by Keke Wyatt

from the album Rated Love
- Released: November 20, 2015
- Recorded: 2015
- Genre: R&B
- Length: 3:54
- Label: Aratek Entertainment
- Songwriter(s): Ketara "Keke" Wyatt, Brandon Hesson, Peter Penn
- Producer(s): Dominic “Dom” Gordon

Keke Wyatt singles chronology
"Make Love" (2015)	"Sexy Song" (2015)	"Love Me" (2016)

"Sexy Song" is a song recorded by the American R&B singer Keke Wyatt for her fourth studio album, Rated Love (2016). The song was released as the lead single on November 20, 2015, by her own label, Aratek Entertainment. The song was written by Keke Wyatt, Brandon Hesson and Peter Penn and produced by Dominic Gordon.

== Background ==
In May 2014, Wyatt released two singles ("Fall in Love" and "Lie Under You") from her first extended play, Ke'Ke'. Promotion for Ke'Ke' from Aratek Entertainment ended in late 2015. However, Wyatt continued to do spot-date performances in the US throughout 2014 and 2015. She also continued starring in TV One's R&B Divas: Atlanta for three seasons.

== Conception and release ==
"Sexy Song" was written by Keke Wyatt, Brandon Hesson and Peter Penn. It was produced by Dominic Gordon. Speaking about the song Wyatt said, "All women should feel sexy in their own skin. I’m a wife, mother of eight, business woman and so many other things, and yes, I can still be sexy while juggling my everyday life. I want to reach the lovers in the world with this track, especially those women who need to be reminded that they are sexy too."

On November 7, 2015, Wyatt released a short video on her YouTube account previewing "Sexy Song" and asking fans to request the song on the radio. The song was released on November 20, 2015, via Apple Music/iTunes and other streaming websites.

== Critical response ==
YouKnowIGotSoul stated in a review, "Just days after teasing r&b fans with a snippet of her new single “Sexy Song”, Keke Wyatt releases the song in full for all to hear. The song is the lead single from her upcoming album which is set to release in early 2016. With “Sexy Song”, Keke shows us her soft and sexy side while remaining true to the genre of r&b."

== Music video ==
The lyric video for the song was released onto Wyatt's YouTube channel on November 20, 2015. The music video for "Sexy Song" was released on Wyatt's YouTube channel on February 18, 2016 directed by Steven C. Pitts and filmed by Rite Media Group.

== Track listings and formats ==
Digital download

1. "Sexy Song" – 3:54

== Charts ==
Chart (2015)	Peak position
US Adult R&B Songs	29

== Release history ==
Region	Date	Format	Label	Ref
Worldwide	November 20, 2015	Digital download,	Aratek Entertainment	
