= Used to Love You (disambiguation) =

Used to Love You may refer to:

- "Used to Love U", a song by John Legend from his debut studio album, Get Lifted
- "Used to Love You", a song by Gwen Stefani from her upcoming third studio album

== See also ==
- "Used to Love (disambiguation)", the name of several songs
- "Used to Love Her". a song by Guns N' Roses from their second studio album, G N' R Lies
- "Used to Love Him", a song by Fiona Apple from her third studio album, Extraordinary Machine
- "Used to Love You Sober", a song by Kane Brown
- "I Used to Love H.E.R.", a song by Common from his second studio album, Resurrection
