= R&B Divas (album) =

Compilation album by Faith Evans
- Released: October 2, 2012
- Genre: R&B
- Length: 48:09
- Label: Prolific; eOne

Faith Evans chronology
Something About Faith (2010)	R&B Divas (2012)	Incomparable (2014)

Singles from R&B Divas
- 1. "Tears of Joy" Released: August 20, 2012; 2. "Dumb" Released: August 28, 2012

R&B Divas is a compilation album led by American singer Faith Evans. The album was released Prolific Music and E1 Music on October 2, 2012 and features previously unreleased content from Evans and fellow female R&B singers Nicci Gilbert, Monifah, Syleena Johnson, and KeKe Wyatt, the first season stars of the same-titled TV One reality series, as well as contribution from Kelly Price and Fantasia. While the compilation is credited as an Evans album, she is performing only on seven of the twelve tracks on R&B Divas, though she compiled and executive produced the album.

Upon release, R&B Divas earned generally mixed reviews from critics who found it well-sung and well-produced but scattered. It however, earned a Grammy nomination for Best R&B Album at the 55th Grammy Awards ceremony. It debuted at number 46 on the US Billboard 200 with first week sales of 10,817 units, also reaching the top ten on both the US R&B/Hip-Hop Albums and the Independent Albums. R&B Divas was preceded by two singles, "Tears of Joy" and "Dumb," both led by Evans, the former of which reached the top five of the US Adult R&B Songs.

== Critical reception ==
Professional ratings
Review scores
Source	Rating
About.com	3.5/5 stars
Allmusic	2/5 stars

Upon release, R&B Divas earned generally mixed reviews by critics. Mark Edward Nero, writer for About.com, felt that "despite its minor flaws, R&B Divas is a well-sung, well-produced compilation proving that although the ladies featured on the album may not have the music industry in the palms of their hands as they did back at the heights of their careers 10 to 15 years ago, they're still creative, talented artists who still have much to offer as far as good music." Andy Kellman from AllMusic wrote that "the show entailed the making of an album to benefit the Whitney E. Houston Academy. This is that album, a compilation featuring all the singers together and apart with a large cast of songwriters and producers. The results, perhaps unsurprisingly, are scattered [...] Five songs, highlighted by "Too High for Love," are basically Evans solo showcases that aren't too distanced stylistically from her 2010 album."

== Chart performance ==
R&B Divas debuted at number 46 on the US Billboard 200 with first week sales of 10,817 units. It also entered the top ten on both the US R&B/Hip-Hop Albums and the Independent Albums, peaking at number six and eight, respectively.

== Track listing ==
R&B Divas track listing
No.	Title	Writer(s)	Performer(s)	Length
1.	"Lovin' Me (Theme from R&B Divas)"	G'harah "PK" Degeddingseze; Nicci Gilbert; Fannie Belle Johnson	Faith Evans; Gilbert; Monifah; Syleena Johnson; KeKe Wyatt	3:37
2.	"Tears of Joy"	Claude Kelly	Evans	4:02
3.	"Mr. Supafly"	Lauren Evans; Alexander James	Wyatt	3:35
4.	"Too High for Love"	James Q. Wright; Sonny J. Mason Osuji; James Rolston; Evans	Evans	3:25
5.	"SisterFriend"	Gordon Chambers; Barry J. Eastmond	Evans; Gilbert; Monifah; Johnson; Wyatt	5:01
6.	"Dumb"	Christian Arlester; Chris "Brody" Brown; Toni Coleman; Achia Dixon; Larrance Dopson; Lamar Edwards; Evans; Camille Hooper; Jaila Simms	Evans	3:29
7.	"Sometimes"	Mike City; Gilbert	N. Gilbert; Helene "Mom" Gilbert	3:47
8.	"True Colors"	Tom Kelly; Cyndi Lauper; Billy Steinberg	Evans; Kelly Price; Fantasia	4:27
9.	"Stonewall"	Johnson	Johnson	3:56
10.	"She's Me"	Anthony Giles	Monifah	3:57
11.	"Soon As I Get Home" (Live in Los Angeles)	Sean Combs; Evans; Chucky Thompson	Evans	4:45
12.	"Jesus Loves" (bonus track)	Shep Crawford; David McGuire; Price; Anna B. Warner	Price	4:08
Total length:				48:09

== Charts ==
Chart performance for R&B Divas
Chart (2012)	Peak position
US Billboard 200	46
US Independent Albums (Billboard)	8
US Top R&B/Hip-Hop Albums (Billboard)	6

== Release history ==
R&B Divas release history
Region	Date	Format(s)	Label	Ref.
Various	October 2, 2012	CD; digital download; streaming	Island	
