= High Priority =

Studio album by Cherrelle
- Released: October 1985
- Recorded: 1985
- Studio: Flyte Tyme Studios; (Minneapolis); Creation Audio; (Minneapolis)
- Genre: R&B
- Length: 42:22
- Label: Tabu
- Producer: Jimmy Jam & Terry Lewis (tracks 1–7, 9 & 10), Cherrelle (track 8)

Cherrelle chronology
Fragile (1984)	High Priority (1985)	Affair (1988)

Singles from High Priority
- 1. "You Look Good To Me" Released: 1985; 2. "Saturday Love" Released: October 16, 1985; 3. "Artificial Heart" Released: 1985; 4. "Will You Satisfy? (UK)"

High Priority is the second studio album by American singer Cherrelle. Released in October 1985, it reached #9 on the Top R&B/Hip-Hop albums chart and #36 on the Billboard 200. It generated Cherrelle's biggest pop hit with her duet with Alexander O'Neal, "Saturday Love" which peaked at #26 on the Billboard Hot 100.

== Background ==
After the success of her debut album, Fragile, Cherrelle returned to the studio to record her second album. She worked predominantly with Jimmy Jam & Terry Lewis again on this project, and co-wrote and co-produced the track "Where Do I Run To" herself.

== Reception ==
Professional ratings
Review scores
Source	Rating
AllMusic	4.5/5 stars

The uptempo lead single, "You Look Good to Me" would reach #26 on the Hot R&B/Hip-Hop Songs chart. The second single was "Saturday Love," which would go on to be a hit peaking at #2 on the R&B charts, Cherrelle's best showing to that point, and would cross over and reach #26 on the Billboard Hot 100. It would also go on to huge popularity in the UK, climbing to #6 on the UK Singles Chart, becoming one of Cherrelle's most recognizable hits. Subsequent singles, the slow jam "Will You Satisfy?" would peak at #57 on the UK Singles Chart and "Artificial Heart" would reach #18 on the R&B chart and become Cherrelle's biggest hit on the Hot Dance Club Play chart at #5.

== Track listing ==
No.	Title	Writer(s)	Length
1.	"The Opening"	James Harris III; Terry Lewis	1:06
2.	"You Look Good to Me"	Harris; Lewis	4:51
3.	"Artificial Heart"	Harris; Lewis	5:00
4.	"New Love"	Harris; Lewis	3:55
5.	"Oh No It's U Again"	Marcus Dair	4:52
6.	"Saturday Love" (featuring Alexander O'Neal)	Harris; Lewis	5:00
7.	"Will You Satisfy?"	Harris; Lewis	4:12
8.	"Where Do I Run To"	Cherrelle Norton; Danny Williams; Herman Davis; Langston Richey	3:42
9.	"High Priority"	Spencer Bernard	6:04
10.	"New Love" (reprise)	Harris; Lewis	0:50

== Charts ==
=== Weekly charts ===
Chart (1985–1986)	Peak position
German Albums (Offizielle Top 100)	65
New Zealand Albums (RMNZ)	32
UK Albums (OCC)	17
US Billboard 200	36
US Top R&B/Hip-Hop Albums (Billboard)	9

=== Year-end charts ===
Chart (1986)	Position
US Top R&B/Hip-Hop Albums (Billboard)	21
