= Incomparable (Faith Evans album) =

Studio album by Faith Evans
- Released: November 24, 2014
- Studio: Various: Paramount Studios; Ameraycan Recording Studios; Serenity Sound; Daddy's House Recording Studios; ATM Studios; Skip Saylor Recording; Alofa 1 Recording
- Genres: Hip hop; R&B
- Length: 63:24
- Labels: Prolific; BMG; RED
- Producers: Faith Evans (exec.); G'harah "PK" Degeddingseze; Steve Russell Harts; Jimmy Rodgers; Mike City; Chucky Thompson; Andre "AJ" Johnson; Ben Briggs III; Lamar "Mars" Edwards; Brian Alexander Morgan; The Futuristiks; Darren Henson & Keith Pelzer

Faith Evans chronology
R&B Divas (2012)	Incomparable (2014)	The King & I (2017)

Singles from Incomparable
- 1. "I Deserve It" Released: June 25, 2014; 2. "Make Love" Released: June 9, 2015; 3. "Good Time" Released: August 31, 2015

Incomparable is the seventh studio album by American recording artist Faith Evans. It was released by Prolific Music Group, with distribution through BMG Chrysalis, on November 24, 2014 in the United States. Her third independent projects under her own label, following her sixth album Something About Faith (2010) and the compilation album R&B Divas (2012), Evans worked a diverse roster of collaborators on the album, including Lamar "Mars" Edwards, Chucky Thompson, Mike City, and Ben Briggs III, among others. A concept album, Incomparable chronicles Evans' post-divorce life, using preludes, interludes, postludes, transitions and segues to the songs together.

The album earned a generally mixed reception from music critics who found it well-crafted and declared it Evans' best album in a decade but felt that the material was too generic and cliché-addled. Upon its release, Incomparable became a minor commercial success. Missing the US Billboard 200, it debuted at number 27 on the Top R&B/Hip-Hop Albums and number 17 on the Independent Albums to her lowest first week sales yet. The album produced three singles, including lead single "I Deserve It" featuring Missy Elliott and Sharaya J which reached the top 20 of the US Adult R&B Songs.

== Background ==
In 2010, Evans released her sixth studio album Something About Faith. Released on Prolific Music Group and distributed by E1 Music, the album marked her first independent release, following her departure from Bad Boy Records in 2003 and her subsequent but short-lived engagement with Capitol Records in 2005. While it received generally mixed to positive reviews from most music critics and earned a Grammy Award nomination for Best Female R&B Vocal Performance at the 2011 ceremony, Something About Faith debuted with first week sales of 23,586 copies only – a considerable drop from her previous album The First Lady, which had opened to 157,000 units in 2005. In 2012, Evans co-executive produced and became a cast member on the TV One reality show R&B Divas: Atlanta alongside fellow R&B singers Nicci Gilbert, Syleena Johnson, Keke Wyatt and Monifah. The show offered an inside look at how the singers balance their music careers and personal lives as they work towards producing an Evans-led compilation album, R&B Divas (2012), in memory of Whitney Houston. Broadcast to rating records for the network, the album earned Evans a Grammy Award nod for Best R&B Album at the 55th awards ceremony.

== Recording ==
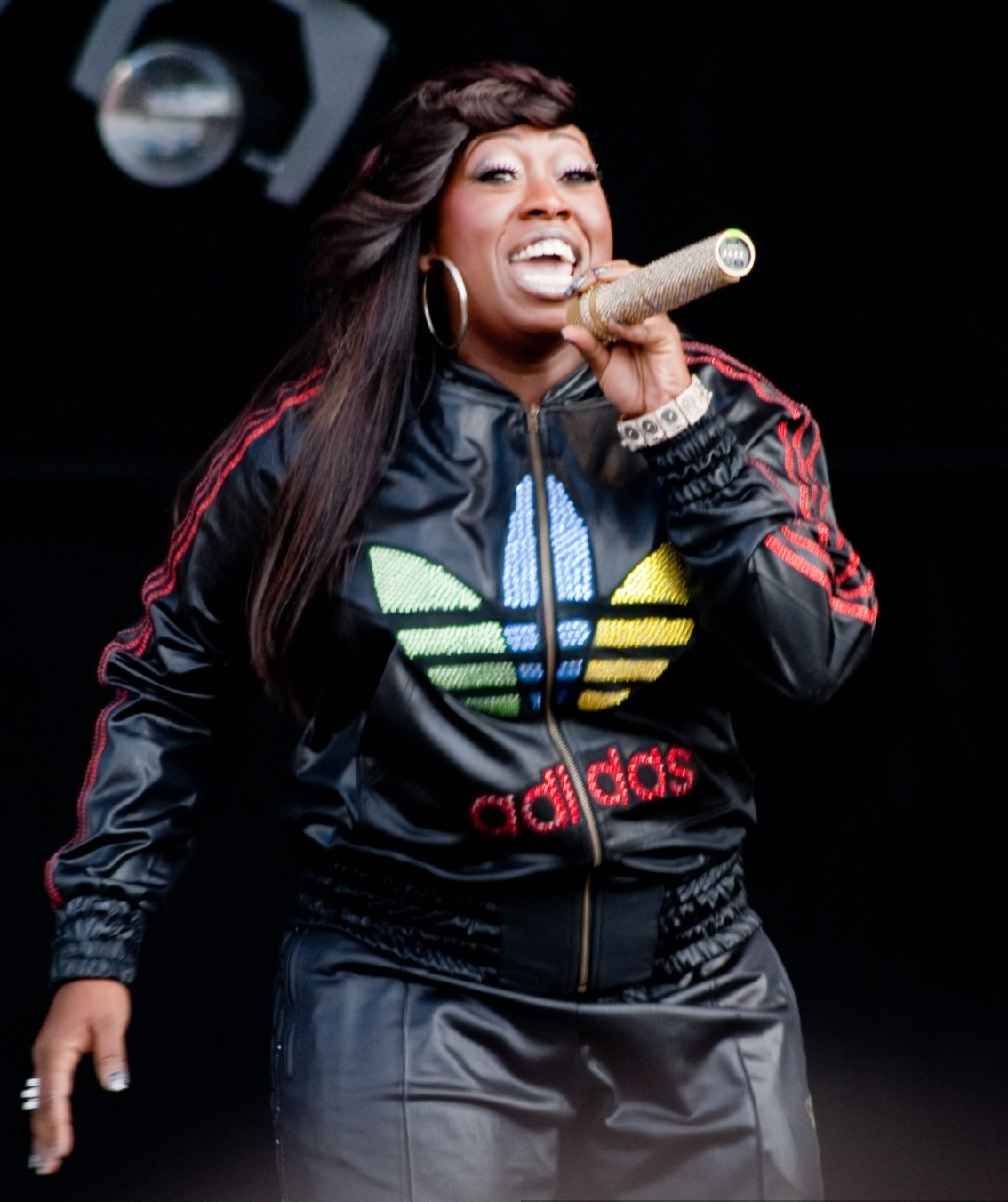
Missy Elliott (pictured) reunited with Evans on lead single "I Deserve It."

The following year, the singer began work on her seventh studio album, which she later cited her "my best work yet." Evans played an important role in every aspect of the album's creation, co-wrote and produced every song on the album, while also serving as the project's executive producer under her Prolific Music imprint. Following her divorce from Todd Russaw, Evans conceptualized a concept album that talks about her post-divorce life, depicting topics such as "dating, having fun, and being upfront about my needs and expectations." For production she consulted several songwrtiters and producers who had worked with her on her previous album Something About Faith (2010) as well as on the compilation album R&B Divas (2012), including Lamar "Mars" Edwards, Chucky Thompson, Mike City, and Ben Briggs III, with Thompson and Briggs setting much of the tone with each contributing four songs to the final tracklisting.

Inspired her self-titled debut album and her third album Faithfully (2001), Evans included preludes, interludes, postludes, transitions and segues to create an actual story that would be told using the track list. While she tapped into a couple of different inspirations, Evans was not looking for a trend-detaching sound throughout the making of the album, commenting: “I definitely didn’t make my album with the goal of it fitting in with anything other than what I feel is worthy of being a part of my catalog.” However, through sampling American bands The Mamas and the Papas and D Train as well as soul singer Aretha Franklin, she created what she called "a nice balance of hip-hop and R&B. I try to be consistent with just making feel-good music — music that I feel. It starts there." The title was inspired by a fan.

== Critical response ==
Professional ratings
Review scores
Source	Rating
AllMusic	3.5/5 stars
The Guardian	2/5 stars
SoulInStereo	3.5/5 stars

Upon release, Incomparable received generally mixed reviews from music critics. SoulTracks editor Melody Charles found that "drom beginning to end, [Evans] packs Incomparable with sophistication, sex appeal and soul. Executive producing and co-writing on every track except one, Evans [laces] up a satisfying set of jams [...] That enviable range, galvinizing grasp of melody and engaging approach to the genre all add up to one truth: after nearly 20 years since her Bad Boy debut, Faith is notorious in her own right. FDRMX reviewer CedricCed wrote that "Incomparable is Faith Evans at her utmost best since her Faithfully album released in 2001 [...] Hard work, sweat, and tears are visible in each and every song, interlude, and production making this album incomparable to anything out in R&b now."

Andy Kellman from Allmusic found that the album "comfortably surpasses everything [Evans] released after 2005's The First Lady" and it offered "a lot to like." He noted however that "the downside to [her] confidence and creative control is that the songs often sound disjointed from one another. These 16 cuts are more like a playlist of mostly good-to-great selections than a focused album." In his review for SoulInStereo, Edward T. Bowser remarked that while Evans' "sixth album doesn’t reach the heights of her most storied work, it still keeps her legacy strong," adding: "Even though Incomparable is well-crafted – strong vocals, solid production, expert songwriting – it still lacks lasting power. There are no true standouts here, a rarity for most Faith albums. In fact, the most memorable tracks tend to be the impressive collection of interludes. Tshepo Mokoena, writing for The Guardian, found that "Evans puts her all into this eighth studio album, but her smokily distinctive voice sits atop melodies and arrangements that rarely innovate." While she found praise for Evans's performances, Mokoena noted that "Evans has stuck to tried-and-tested formulas [..] It’s just a shame that her cliche-ridden lyrics feel so impersonal."

== Chart performance ==
Incomparable debuted at No. 27 on the US Top R&B/Hip-Hop Albums and No. 17 on the US Independent Albums chart with first week sales of 3,920 copies. It marked Evans' lowest-selling album since 2005's A Faithful Christmas and became her first non-traditional studio album to miss both the top ten of the Top R&B/Hip-Hop Albums chart and the upper half of the US Billboard 200.

== Track listing ==
Incomparable track listing
No.	Title	Writer(s)	Producer(s)	Length
1.	"Prelude"/"Thank You Good Night"	Faith Evans; G'harah Degeddingseze; Steve Russell Harts; Jimmy Rodgers; Shanell Irving; Lakeisha Renee Lewis; Tonyatta Martinez	Evans ("Prelude"); Degeddingseze; Harts; Rodgers; Evans^{[a]} ("Thank You Good Night")	4:42
2.	"Extraordinary"	Evans; Michael Flowers; Toni Coleman; Achaia Dixon; Camille Hooper; Jaila Simms; Ben Briggs III	Mike City; Evans	3:28
3.	"I Deserve It" (featuring Missy Elliott & Sharaya J)	Evans; Carl Thompson; Andre Johnson; Chyna Griffin; Coleman; Dixon; Melissa Elliott; Sharaya Howell; Nina Simone; Weldon Irvine	Chucky Thompson; Johnson; Evans	3:40
4.	"Really Wanna Do"	Evans; Briggs; Coleman; Simms; Jeffrey Brown; Raven Chambers	Briggs; Evans; Brown^{[a]}	3:39
5.	"Take Your Time (Interlude)"	Evans; Lamar Edwards; Akelee Nefertiti Relliford; Briggs	Mars; Evans^{[a]}	2:37
6.	"Fragile"	Evans; Thompson; Coleman; Dixon; Simms; Briggs; John Phillips; Michelle Phillips	Thompson; Evans	3:43
7.	"Incomparable"	Evans; Brian Alexander Morgan; Simms; Briggs; Coleman; Hubert Eaves III; James Williams	Morgan; Evans	3:51
8.	"Ride the Beat (Interlude)"	Evans; Thompson; Coleman; Simms; Briggs	Thompson; Evans	2:40
9.	"Make Love" (featuring Keke Wyatt)	Evans; Edwards; Michael Ray Cox, Jr.; John Wesley Groover; Ketara Wyatt; Coleman; Corey Marks	Mars; The Futuristiks; Evans	6:47
10.	"Good Time" (featuring Problem)	Evans; Edwards; Coleman; Simms; Briggs; Dixon; Jason Martin	Mars; Evans	4:34
11.	"Forever"	Evans; Briggs; Rufus Moore; Sydney-Michelle Harvey; Simms; Brown; Raven	Briggs; Evans; Simms^{[a]}	4:09
12.	"Ever Go Away (Interlude)"	Thompson; Evans	Thompson; Evans	2:03
13.	"He Is"	Jazmine Sullivan; Darren Henson; Keith Pelzer	Darren Henson; Keith Pelzer	4:28
14.	"Paradise" (featuring B. Slade & Karen Clark-Sheard)	Evans; Flowers; Briggs; Simms; Andrea Latrelle Simmons; Anthony Williams	City; Evans	3:42
15.	"Thank You's (Outro)"	Evans; Briggs; Coleman; Simms; Brown; Chambers; Joe Wilson	Briggs; Evans	5:41
16.	"Maybe"	Evans; Griffin; Briggs	Briggs; Evans	3:39
Total length:				63:24

Notes

- ^{^a} signifies a co-producer

== Charts ==
Chart performance for Incomparable
Chart (2014)	Peak position
US Independent Albums (Billboard)	17
US Top R&B/Hip-Hop Albums (Billboard)	27

== Release history ==
Incomparable release history
Region	Date	Formats	Label	Ref.
United States	November 24, 2014	CD; digital download	Prolific; BMG; RED	
