= Who Knew? =

Studio album by Keke Wyatt
- Released: February 23, 2010
- Length: 43:00
- Label: Shanachie
- Producers: L. Young; Harvey Mason Jr.; Troy Oliver; Kevin Randolph; Steven Russell; David Stewart; True Storee; Tank; The Underdogs

Keke Wyatt chronology
Soul Sista (2001)	Who Knew? (2010)	Unbelievable (2011)

Singles from Who Knew?
- 1. "Who Knew?" Released: December 22, 2009

Who Knew? is the second studio album by American singer Keke Wyatt. It was released on February 23, 2010, by Shanachie Records. Containing material from Wyatt's previously shelved albums Emotional Rollercoaster (2005) and Ghetto Rose (2007), the album was preceded by the release of the title track "Who Knew?" as the lead single, which failed to chart commercially. Who Knew? charted at number 35 on Top R&B/Hip-Hop Albums chart and number 30 on the Independent Albums chart.

== Promotion ==
A music video for "Who Knew?" was released January 4, 2010 on YouTube. The title track "Who Knew?" was performed on Fox 5 Channel and Cafe Soul Live in St. Louis. Keke performed at the venue Club Secrets on October 16, 2010, in the United States performing "Who Knew" and previous singles "My First Love", "If Only You Knew" and "Nothing in This World" with her brother Keever Wyatt.

== Critical reception ==
Professional ratings
Review scores
Source	Rating
About.com	3/5 stars
AllMusic	3/5 stars
PopMatters	6/10 stars
Soul in Stereo	4/5 stars

Edwin Boswer from Soulinstereo rated the album four out of five stars. He wrote: "The first thing you'll notice is that her voice has become even stronger during her absence [...] Fans of Beyoncé's Sasha Fierce, or even Monica's new one, likely will be bored by the lack of boisterous beats from today’s most sought-after producers. But [...] Who Knew? is a return to R&B’s roots. Let’s hope this triumph is just the first of many for Keke."

PopMatters's Tyler Lewis found that Wyatt "has crafted an album that is designed to let everyone know that she is here to stay. Who Knew? is built around Wyatt's gospel-reared, wonderfully versatile voice, which, mostly, works out in fine, if uninspiring, fashion [...] Who Knew? proves that Wyatt is a terrific singer. But that doesn't necessarily mean this is a terrific album. It is not. But it is good enough to make Keke Wyatt a singer to watch."

== Commercial performance ==
In the United States, Who Knew? peaked at number thirty-five on Billboard's Top R&B/Hip-Hop Albums, spending a total of eight weeks on the chart, and number thirty on the Independent Albums, spending two weeks on the chart.

== Track listing ==
Who Knew? track listing
No.	Title	Writer(s)	Producer(s)	Length
1.	"Who Knew?"	Durrell Babbs; Eric Dawkins; Antonio Dixon; Harvey Mason, Jr.; Steven Russell; Damon Thomas	Mason; Dawkins^{[a]}	3:41
2.	"Never Do It Again"	Mason; Russell; Thomas	The Underdogs; Russell	4:27
3.	"Without You"	KeKe Wyatt; Lawrence "L." Young	Young	5:07
4.	"Daydreaming"	Wyatt; Theodore "Range" Bowen	Troy Oliver	3:57
5.	"So Confused"	Young	Young	4:47
6.	"Weakest"	Mason; Kevin Randolph; David Stewart	The Underdogs; Randolph; Stewart	5:03
7.	"Peace on Earth"	Rachelle Ferrell	Young	4:24
8.	"Got Me One (Good Man)"	Babbs; Mason; Thomas	The Underdogs; Tank	4:15
9.	"Getting It"	Wyatt; Antonio Mobley	True Storee	3:38
10.	"Never Give Up"	Wyatt; Steve "Stone" Huf	Young; Huff^{[b]}	3:41
Total length:				43:00

Notes

- ^{^[a]} signifies additional vocal co-producer(s)
- ^{^[b]} signifies original co-producer(s)

== Credits and personnel ==
Album credits taken from AllMusic.

- Keke Wyatt – vocals, vocal arrangement, composer
- Antonio Dixon – composer
- A. Mobley – composer
- Damon Thomas – composer
- Durrell Babbs – composer, instrumentation, producer
- Eric Dawkins – composer
- Harvey Mason, Jr. – composer, mixing, producer
- Kevin Randolph – composer, instrumentation, producer
- Rachelle Ferrell – composer
- Steve Huff – arranger, composer
- Steven Russell – composer, instrumentation, producer
- Theodore "Range" Bowen – composer
- Loeíen Babajian – design
- Aaron Frisbee – engineer
- Aubry "Big Juice" Delaine – engineer, mixing
- Andrew Hey – engineer, mixing assistant
- Dabling Harward – engineer
- David Boyd – assistant engineer
- Deyon Dobson – engineer, mixing
- True Storee – arranger, engineer, producer
- The Underdogs – instrumentation, producer
- Bryant Siono – bass guitar
- Daniel Groover – acoustic guitar
- Kay Ta Matsuno – guitar
- Robert Vosgien – mastering
- Peter Mokran – mixing
- Gregory Douglas – executive producer
- Vickie Fulwider-Williams – executive producer
- Troy Oliver – producer
- Angela N. Golightly – production coordination

== Charts ==
Weekly chart performance for Who Knew?
Chart (2010)	Peak position
US Independent Albums (Billboard)	30
US Top R&B/Hip-Hop Albums (Billboard)	35

== Release history ==
Who Knew? release history
Region	Date	Format	Label	Ref.
Various	February 23, 2010	CD; digital download	Shanachie	
