= R&B Divas: Los Angeles =

- Also known as: R&B Divas: LA
- Genre: Reality television
- Created by: Nicci Gilbert-Daniels
- Starring: Chanté Moore; Cynthia "Lil' Mo" Loving; Michel'le Toussaint; Leela James (seasons 2–3); Stacy Francis (season 3); Christina "Brave" Williams (season 3); Chrisette Michele (seasons 2–3); Claudette Ortiz (seasons 1-2); Dawn Robinson (season 1); Kelly Price (season 1)
- Opening theme: "I'm a Diva"
- Composers: Lil' Mo; Chanté Moore
- Country of origin: United States
- Original language: English
- No. of seasons: 3
- No. of episodes: 34

Production
- Executive producers: Nicci Gilbert; Leslie Greif; Adam Reed; Adam Freeman; Phil Thornton; Paul Coy Allen; Aaron Fishman; Faith Evans; BennyWond3r; Jubba Seyyid
- Producer: Lamar Chase
- Running time: 41 to 43 minutes
- Production company: Thinkfactory Media

Original release
- Network: TV One
- Release: July 10, 2013 – April 29, 2015

Related
- R&B Divas: Atlanta

R&B Divas: Los Angeles (also known as R&B Divas: LA) is an American reality television series on TV One that premiered on July 10, 2013. The series chronicles the lives of a group of female R&B singers living in Los Angeles as they balance their music careers and personal lives. It is a spinoff to R&B Divas: Atlanta.

Three seasons of R&B Divas: Los Angeles aired, in 2013, 2014, and 2015 respectively. The cast changed between seasons, although Lil Mo, Chanté Moore and Michel'le remained on the show throughout its run.

The series' second season premiered on July 17, 2014, with Leela James and Chrisette Michelle joining the cast after the departures of Kelly Price and Dawn Robinson (En Vogue) . The series' third season premiered on February 11, 2015 with Stacy Francis and Christina "Brave" Williams joining the cast after the departure of City High's Claudette Ortiz.

A two-episode reunion special for the first season was filmed on August 6, 2013, with Wendy Williams as the host. Part 1 of the R&B Divas: Los Angeles reunion acquired a 0.83 rating among P25-54 and a 0.95 rating among households. It drew a total of 834,000 viewers on its original airing night. The episode is tied with The Rickey Smiley Show as TV One's highest-rated telecast among adults 25–54. In 2016, series cast member Michel'le confirmed on The Wendy Williams Show, that the show was cancelled.

== Cast ==
=== Overview ===
Cast	Seasons		
Cast	1	2	3
Chanté Moore	Main	Main	Main
Cynthia "Lil' Mo" Loving	Main	Main	Main
Michel'le Toussaint	Main	Main	Main
Claudette Ortiz	Main	Main	
Dawn Robinson	Main		
Kelly Price	Main		
Leela James		Main	Main
Chrisette Michele		Main	Main
Stacy Francis			Main
Christina "Brave" Williams			Main

== Episodes ==
Season	Episodes	Originally released	
Season	Episodes	First released	Last released
1	10	July 10, 2013	September 11, 2013
2	12	July 17, 2014	October 1, 2014
3	12	February 11, 2015	April 29, 2015

=== Season 1 (2013) ===
No. overall	No. in season	Title	Original release date	U.S. viewers (millions)
1	1	"Lights, Cameras, Divas"	July 10, 2013	N/A
2	2	"The Divalogues"	July 17, 2013	N/A
3	3	"A Chapel Full of Divas"	July 24, 2013	N/A
4	4	"Beginning of The End"	July 31, 2013	N/A
5	5	"Diva's Divided"	August 7, 2013	N/A
6	6	"Diva Throw Down"	August 14, 2013	N/A
7	7	"The Show Must Go On"	August 21, 2013	N/A
8	8	"What Would a Diva Do?"	August 28, 2013	N/A
9	9	"The Reunion Part One"	September 4, 2013	N/A
10	10	"The Reunion Part Two"	September 11, 2013	N/A

=== Season 2 (2014) ===
No. overall	No. in season	Title	Original release date	U.S. viewers (millions)
11	1	"Even Divas Have Demons"	July 16, 2014	N/A
12	2	"Don't Deceive a Diva"	July 23, 2014	N/A
13	3	"Bonding Time or Breaking Point?"	July 30, 2014	N/A
14	4	"Diva's Got a Brand New Bag"	August 6, 2014	N/A
15	5	"Diva in Denial"	August 13, 2014	N/A
16	6	"From Ratchet to Righteous"	August 20, 2014	N/A
17	7	"More Management, More Problems"	August 27, 2014	N/A
18	8	"A Pain in the Neck"	September 3, 2014	N/A
19	9	"Get Your Puerto Freak-On"	September 10, 2014	N/A
20	10	"Carnage at Carnaval"	September 17, 2014	N/A
21	11	"The Reunion Part One"	September 24, 2014	N/A
22	12	"The Reunion Part Two"	October 1, 2014	N/A

=== Season 3 (2015) ===
No. overall	No. in season	Title	Original release date	U.S. viewers (millions)
23	1	"The Divas Rise Above"	February 11, 2015	N/A
24	2	"The Little White Lie"	February 18, 2015	N/A
25	3	"Diva Date Night Disaster"	February 25, 2015	N/A
26	4	"A New Idea, A New Diva"	March 4, 2015	N/A
27	5	"A Diva Strikes Out"	March 11, 2015	0.23
28	6	"Diva Showcase Showdown"	March 18, 2015	N/A
29	7	"It's Lonely In The Shade"	March 25, 2015	0.27
30	8	"Diva Shade on Stage"	April 1, 2015	N/A
31	9	"Diva I Do, Diva I Don't"	April 8, 2015	0.24
32	10	"A House Of Blues Divided"	April 15, 2015	0.27
33	11	"The Reunion Part One"	April 22, 2015	0.38
34	12	"The Reunion Part Two"	April 29, 2015	0.32
