= Unbelievable (Keke Wyatt album) =

Studio album by Keke Wyatt
- Released: June 14, 2011
- Length: 45:55
- Label: Shanachie
- Producers: Jesus Bobe; Shep Crawford; Dante "Inferno" Jackson; Dem Jointz; Ollie Gabriel; JR Hutson; Steve Morales; Ryan Pate; Phillip Scott III; L. Young; Dr. Zeus

Keke Wyatt chronology
Who Knew? (2010)	Unbelievable (2011)	Ke'Ke' (2014)

Singles from Unbelievable
- 1. "Saturday Love" Released: May 24, 2011

Unbelievable is the third studio album by American singer Keke Wyatt. It was released on June 14, 2011 through Shanachie Records.

== Promotion ==
Among other covers, Unbelievable includes the track "Saturday Love", which features Ruben Studdard and is the only single, which was released on May 24, 2011. It's the original cover of "Saturday Love" by Cherrelle and Alexander O'Neal.

== Critical reception ==
Professional ratings
Review scores
Source	Rating
AllMusic	3/5 stars

Jon Caramanica from The New York Times called Unbelievable Wyatt's "most thrilling album, reminiscent of an early Faith Evans record, with feisty declarations of love and empowerment over lush, soft-edged hip-hop production." SoulTracks critic Howard Dukes wrote of the album: "KeKe Wyatt has had an eventful decade, and hopefully the storms have passed. However, it’s possible to use the trials of life as inspiration for art. It appears that has Wyatt managed to do just that on Unbelievable."

AllMusic editor Andy Kellman rated the album three out of five stars. He was critical with Wyatt's decision to work with a larger number of collaborators on Unbelievabkle, writing: "There are so many of them that the album sounds disjointed, from the lack of song-to-song flow to the variety of effects placed on Wyatt’s voice [...] This being a Shanachie release, there are some intriguing choices for covers. Wyatt and Ruben Studdard play Cherrelle and Alexander O’Neal on a thumping, glitzy cover of "Saturday Love," while Eric Clapton's "Tears in Heaven" gets a surprisingly light reading."

== Commercial performance ==
The album debuted and peaked at number 48 on the US Top R&B/Hip-Hop Albums chart.

== Track listing ==
Unbelievable track listing
No.	Title	Writer(s)	Producer(s)	Length
1.	"Light Me Up"	KeKe Wyatt; Lauren Evans; Ollie Gabriel; Ryan Pate	Gabriel; Pate	3:58
2.	"Unbelievable"	Kelly Price; Phillip Scott III	Shep Crawford; Dem Jointz; Scott	4:13
3.	"Mirror" (with Kelly Price and Tweet)	Montell Jordan; Crawford	Crawford	4:10
4.	"Love Under New Management"	Annette Hardeman; Gabriel Hardeman	Crawford	4:46
5.	"Tap Out"	Dante "Inferno" Jackson; Ramir Vincent; Solomon Dykes	Jackson	4:09
6.	"Saturday Love" (with Ruben Studdard)	James Harris III; Terry Lewis	JR Hutson	3:58
7.	"Miss Your Plane"	Eritza Laues; Huston	Hutson	3:47
8.	"Enough"	Wyatt; Donte Peeps; Keithin Pittman; Steve Morales	Morales	3:53
9.	"Travel the World (Love Uses Time)"	Wyatt; Frankie Storm; Jesus Bobe	Bobe; Dr. Zeus	2:52
10.	"Tears in Heaven"	Eric Clapton; Will Jennings	L. Young	3:35
11.	"His Eye Is on the Sparrow"	Civilla D. Martin; Charles H. Gabriel		5:30
Total length:				45:55

== Charts ==
Weekly chart performance for Unbelievable
Chart (2011)	Peak position
US Top R&B/Hip-Hop Albums (Billboard)	48
