= Fragile (Cherrelle album) =

Studio album by Cherrelle
- Released: April 8, 1984
- Recorded: 1983–1984
- Studios: Creation Audio (Minneapolis); Larrabee Sound Studios & Studio Masters (Los Angeles); Eight Mile-John Lodge Studios & Fiddler Studios (Los Angeles)
- Genres: R&B; soul; dance-pop; synth-pop; funk
- Length: 43:22
- Labels: Tabu; CBS
- Producers: Jimmy Jam; Terry Lewis; Michael Everitt Dunlap; Isaac Suthers

Cherrelle chronology
Fragile (1984)	High Priority (1985)

Singles from Fragile
- 1. "I Didn't Mean to Turn You On" Released: April 1984; 2. "Fragile… Handle With Care" Released: 1984

Professional ratings
Review scores
Source	Rating
allmusic	4/5 stars

Fragile is the debut studio album by American singer Cherrelle. It was released on April 8, 1984 by Tabu Records and was the first of four records for the label (she would leave Tabu after the release of 1991's The Woman I Am). The album peaked at number 27 on the Billboard R&B Albums chart.

The album was mostly written, arranged and produced by Jimmy Jam and Terry Lewis (a/k/a Flyte Time Productions), and, under their guidance, she scored a smash R&B hit with "I Didn't Mean to Turn You On". The song reached number eight on the US Hot R&B chart and number 79 on the Billboard Hot 100.

== Track listing ==
No.	Title	Writer(s)	Producer(s)	Length
1.	"Fragile...Handle With Care"	James Harris III; Terry Lewis	Jimmy Jam; Lewis	6:02
2.	"I Didn't Mean to Turn You On"	Harris; Lewis	Jam; Lewis	7:03
3.	"Like I Will"	Harris; Lewis	Jam; Lewis	7:24
4.	"I Will Wait For You"	Maxi Anderson; Isaac Suthers; Michael Dunlap	Suthers; Dunlap	3:40
5.	"Who's It Gonna Be"	Harris; Lewis	Jam; Lewis	4:38
6.	"Stay With Me"	Bill Champlin; Suthers; Dunlap	Suthers; Dunlap	4:00
7.	"When You Look In My Eyes"	Harris; Lewis	Jam; Lewis	4:48
8.	"I Need You Now"	Champlin; Suthers; Dunlap	Suthers; Dunlap	4:35

== Personnel ==
Production and credits

Tracks 1–3, 5, 7

- Arranged & Produced by Jimmy Jam & Terry Lewis For Flyte Tyme Productions
- Engineered & Mixed by Steve Wiese & Taavi Mote
- Additional Recording Engineers: Judy Clapp & Steve Hodge
- Jimmy Jam - synthesizers, synth programming, acoustic piano, drum programming, percussion, backing vocals
- Terry Lewis - keyboards, synthesizers, electric bass, drum programming, backing vocals
- Monte Moir - synthesizers, percussion, backing vocals
- David Eiland - tuba, saxophone
- Randy Jenkins, Lucia Newell, Gwendolyn Traylor - backing vocals

Tracks 4, 6, 8

- Arranged & Produced by Michael Everitt Dunlap & Isaac Suthers, with additional vocal arrangements by Maxi Anderson
- Engineered by Robert Biles
- Assistant Engineers: Michael Gilbert, Dennis Woods & Kelvin Dixon
- Mixed by Mike Evans & Taavi Mote
- Michael Everitt Dunlap - electric, acoustic and bass guitars, acoustic piano, drums, backing vocals
- Isaac Suthers - synthesizers
- Eric Sylvester Daniels - synthesizers, Fender Rhodes
- Ellis Smith - electric and acoustic guitars
- Terry Santiel - percussion
- Maxi Anderson, Bill Champlin, Tamara Champlin, Phyllis St. James, Randall Jenkins, Gwenche Macho - backing vocals

== Charts ==
Chart (1984)	Peak position
US Billboard 200	144
US Top R&B/Hip-Hop Albums (Billboard)	27

== Release history ==
Label	Cat. No.		Format	Date
Tabu	PZ 39144	^{US}	Vinyl, Cassette	1984
Tabu	TBU 26064	^{UK}	Vinyl	1984
Tabu	ZK 39144	^{US}	CD	1986
Tabu	25DP 5368	^{JP}	CD	1989
Tabu, The Right Stuff	72435-41819-2-4	^{EU} ^{US}	CD	2002
Solid	CDSOL-5207	^{JP}	CD	2013
Tabu	TABU1003	^{UK}	CD	2013
