= Cherrelle =

American singer (born 1958)

- Born: Cheryl Ann Norton; October 13, 1958 (age 67); Los Angeles, California, U.S.
- Origin: Detroit, Michigan, U.S.
- Genres: R&B; soul; dance-pop; funk
- Occupation: Singer
- Instrument: Vocals
- Years active: 1983–present
- Labels: Tabu; Power

Cheryl Anne Norton (born October 13, 1958), better known by her stage name Cherrelle, is an American R&B singer and songwriter who gained fame in the mid-1980s. Her signature hits include "I Didn't Mean to Turn You On", "Where Do I Run To", "Everything I Miss at Home", and duets with R&B singer Alexander O'Neal such as "Saturday Love" and "Never Knew Love Like This", as well as "Always" with her cousin Pebbles.

== Biography ==
Born in Los Angeles, her father, James Feaster, was a Detroit attorney who was also her manager. She began her career working with jazz/R&B artists Norman Connors and Michael Henderson, as well as touring with Luther Vandross. After Tabu Records founder Clarence Avant heard her demo, he signed her to Tabu Records in 1983. Cherrelle decided on her stage name after a boss from a previous job hollered "Cher-relle, you're late again!"

In 1984, under the production of Jimmy Jam and Terry Lewis, Cherrelle released her debut album, Fragile. It featured her first R&B top 10 single, "I Didn't Mean to Turn You On". That song (with a music video homage to the film King Kong, featuring Cherrelle as the beast's love interest) was covered about a year later by pop singer Robert Palmer on his 1985 album Riptide. It was also covered by Mariah Carey for her 2001 soundtrack album Glitter using the same instrumental track.

Cherrelle's follow-up album, High Priority, was certified gold and produced the top 40 hit and the No. 2 R&B hit "Saturday Love"; a duet with Alexander O'Neal, it would also land in the top 10 of the UK Singles Chart, peaking at No. 6. Cherrelle and O'Neal would have another top 40 single with "Never Knew Love Like This", which peaked at No. 28 US pop in 1988, and No. 2 R&B. A remixed version of "Saturday Love" on Tabu Records reached No. 55 in the UK Singles Chart in early 1990. Her third album, 1988's Affair, included the No. 1 R&B single, "Everything I Miss at Home". The album's title track became another hit, peaking at No. 4 on the R&B chart.

Cherrelle's cousin is pop singer Perri "Pebbles" Reid; and she is the aunt of Brandi of the girl group Blaque. Cherrelle is also a first cousin of music producer and gospel artist Monica Feaster. In addition to Cherrelle's musical background, she and Johnny Gill were featured on Pebbles' 1991 single "Always", which made the R&B top 20. That same year, Cherrelle released the album The Woman I Am, a first-time departure from using Jam and Lewis productions. The singer linked with producer Narada Michael Walden (known for working with Whitney Houston). Cherrelle reunited with the producers eight years later with her independent album The Right Time, released in 1999, and featuring a guest appearance from rapper Keith Murray.

== Voice and musical ability ==
Cherrelle has a light lyric soprano vocal range. Her voice has been called a "light, wispy and occasionally whiny soprano" which influenced the urban contemporary music markets by Ron Wynn of AllMusic. Cherrelle's "light and airy soprano" were considered the inspiration as to why Jimmy Jam and Terry Lewis wanted to produce her and showcase her gift to the world. Other critics gave her praise for being able to convey emotions.

== Discography ==
Studio albums

- Fragile (1984)
- High Priority (1985)
- Affair (1988)
- The Woman I Am (1991)
- The Right Time (1999)
