= Rated Love =

Studio album by Keke Wyatt
- Released: April 22, 2016
- Length: 46:07
- Labels: Aratek; INgrooves
- Producers: Robert Erness; Dominic "Dom" Gordon; Terrell "Hendrix" Green; Jevon Hill; Johniee Miller; Diego Morales; Kevin "KP" Pridgen Jr.; Aaron Scott; Theodore Thomas; Eero Turunen

Keke Wyatt chronology
Ke'Ke' (2014)	Rated Love (2016)	Keke Covers (2017)

Singles from Rated Love
- 1. "Sexy Song" Released: November 20, 2015; 2. "Love Me" Released: March 18, 2016; 3. "Jodeci" Released: October 21, 2016

Rated Love is the fourth studio album by American R&B singer Keke Wyatt. It was released on April 22, 2016, by Aratek Entertainment and INgrooves via Universal Music Group. The album was preceded by the release of three singles, including "Sexy Song", "Love Me" and "Jodeci".

== Promotion ==
"Sexy Song" was released as the album's lead single on November 20, 2015. It peaked at number 26 on the US Adult R&B Songs chart. A music video for "Sexy Song" was released on Wyatt's YouTube channel on February 18, 2016, directed by Steven C. Pitts and filmed by Rite Media Group. Wyatt performed an impromptu version of the song at SOB's in New York City. Wyatt also performed "Sexy Song" at the Capitale night club in Washington, DC on December 12, 2015, and on Essence Live on February 12, 2016.

On March 18, 2016, Wyatt took to social media to announce "Love Me" as the second single from Rated Love. It was released on March 18, 2016. On October 13, 2016, Wyatt revealed "Jodeci" as the third single from th album, stating: "I think we got a new one with my new single Jodeci!!! I wanna know what ya'll think" revealing it would be released with a deluxe version of her album Rated Love on October 21, 2016. A music video for the song was released to Wyatt's YouTube channel on October 17, 2016.

== Critical reception ==
Professional ratings
Review scores
Source	Rating
Soul in Stereo	3.5/5 stars

Soul in Stereo gave the album a 3.5 rating, stating that "If the album’s title wasn’t enough to clue you in on this album’s themes, the tracks themselves tell the story: “Love Me,” “Dumb Love,” Still Have Love,” “Love Reigns” — KeKe's fourth album is an audio love letter, with the mistress of ceremonies simply narrating life's emotional rollercoasters. Centric wrote: "Her single "Love Me," perfectly captures the ups and downs of marriage and relationships, particularly when you're faced with conflict but yet can't help but be with the one you love. Another standout record on the album, "If It Ain't You" — among many others — is a beautiful ballad that showcases Keke's natural ability to breathe life into a love song like no other."

SoulTracks editor Melody Charles felt that "with its adept pacing, experimentation in style approaches and enthusiastic delivery, Rated Love showcases why KeKe Wyatt will continue rise and to personify that "80/20 rule" that so often applied to relationships: admitted flaws and irritants don't justify going without when you truly have a good thing." She further noted: "Co-writing the bulk of Rated allows the full spectrum of [Wyatt's] gifts to shine, whether she's getting the groove on ("Sexy Song"), detailing how sprung she is (the tangy groove "On Repeat") or explaining precisely why ol' boy's clothes are spilling out of trash bags out on the porch (the soaring lump-in-the-throat ballads "24 Hours" and "No Peace")."

== Commercial performance ==
On February 19, 2016, Wyatt announced on Twitter, that the album would be available for pre-order on digital music stores, while also revealing the album cover. In the week of May 14, 2016, Rated Love debuted at number 11 on the US Billboard's Top R&B Albums, number 16 on Billboard's Top Independent Album, and number 19 on Billboard's Top R&B/Hip-Hop Albums charts. It also charted at number eighty on the Top Current Albums chart.

== Track listing ==
Rated Love track listing
No.	Title	Writer(s)	Producer(s)	Length
1.	"Anything"	Keke Wyatt; Robert Erness	Erness	3:16
2.	"Sexy Song"	Wyatt; Brandon Hesson; Peter Penn	Dominic "Dom" Gordon	3:54
3.	"On Repeat"	Wyatt; Hesson; Gordon; Jenny Karr; Kyle Christopher; Shantee Taylor	Diego Morales; Eero Turunen	3:11
4.	"Things Change (Interlude)"	Wyatt	Gordon	0:10
5.	"24 Hours"	Wyatt; Erness	Erness	3:57
6.	"No Peace"	Wyatt; Hesson; Gordon; Taylor	Gordon	3:24
7.	"If It Ain't You"	Wyatt; Hesson; Gordon; Taylor	Gordon	3:39
8.	"Dumb Love"	Wyatt; Hesson; Gordon; Taylor	Gordon	3:35
9.	"Make It Work (Interlude)"	Wyatt	Gordon	0:10
10.	"Love Me"	Wyatt; Hesson; Gordon	Gordon	3:00
11.	"Still Have Love"	Carmael M. Frith	Jevon Hill; Theodore Thomas	3:15
12.	"I Know"	Wayne Wilson	Aaron Scott; Johniee Miller; Kevin "KP" Pridgen Jr.; Terrell "Hendrix" Green	3:42
13.	"If I Had You"	Wyatt; Hesson; Gordon; Taylor	Gordon	4:33
14.	"Love Reigns (Interlude)"	Wyatt	Gordon	0:06
15.	"It's Reigning"	Wyatt; Erness	Erness	2:42
16.	"If I Had You" (radio edit)	Wyatt; Hesson; Gordon; Taylor	Gordon	3:33
Total length:				46:07

Deluxe edition – bonus tracks
No.	Title	Writer(s)	Producer(s)	Length
17.	"Jodeci"	Wyatt; Hesson; Gordon; Donald Earle DeGrate, Jr.	Gordon	3:24
18.	"Red Light"	Wyatt; Hesson; Gordon; Milton Adams; Samira Lashay Taylor	Gordon	3:17
19.	"I Won't Complain"	Wyatt; Hesson; Gordon; Erness; Taylor	Gordon	3:14
20.	"Back to You"	Wyatt; Gordon; Erness	Gordon	3:20
Total length:				59:30

== Credits and personnel ==
Album credits taken from AllMusic and Discogs.

Performers and musicians

- Keke Wyatt – vocals, background vocals, composition

Technical personnel

- Aaron Scott – production
- Alex D. Rogers – photography
- Brandon Hesson – composition
- Carmael Frith – composition
- Diego Morales – production
- Dominic Gordon – composition, engineering, mixing, production
- Eero Turunen – production
- Jenny Karr – composition
- Jevon Hill – production
- Johnnie Miller – production
- Kevin "KP" Pridgen Jr. – engineering, mixing, production
- Kyle Christopher – composition
- Michael Ford – executive production
- Peter Penn – composition
- Profango Amore – graphic design
- Robert Erness – composition, production
- Shantee Tyler – composition
- Steve Morales – engineer, mixing
- Terrell "Hendrix" Green – production
- Theodore Thomas – production
- Wayne Wilson – composition

== Charts ==
Weekly chart performance for Rated Love
Chart (2016)	Peak position
US Independent Albums (Billboard)	16
US Top R&B/Hip-Hop Albums (Billboard)	19

== Release history ==
Rated Love release history
Region	Date	Edition	Format	Label	Ref
Various	April 22, 2016	Standard	Digital download; CD	Aratek Entertainment; INgrooves	
Various	October 21, 2016	Deluxe	Digital download; CD	Aratek Entertainment; INgrooves	
