= Emotional Rollercoaster (album) =

Studio album by Keke Wyatt
- Released: 2005
- Recorded: 2004–2005
- Genre: R&B
- Label: Cash Money Records; Universal Motown Records

Keke Wyatt chronology
Soul Sista (2001)	Emotional Rollercoaster (2005)	Who Knew? (2010)

Singles from Emotional Rollercoaster
- 1. "Put Your Hands On Me" Released: May 31, 2005

Emotional Rollercoaster is the unreleased second studio album by American R&B recording artist Keke Wyatt. The album was planned to be released on May 31, 2005, but after two postponed release dates, the release was cancelled altogether. One single, "Put Your Hands on Me", was released on May 31, 2005, and was highly successful on the US urban radio.

Songs slated to appear on her second album included the first single; Look at What You Made Me Do;, Insecurity, written by Bryan Michael Cox; My Man; Six Questions, featuring Avant; Cheaters; Who Knows, written by R&B singer Tank; Peace On Earth, a remake of a Rachelle Ferrell single; and the title track Emotional Rollercoaster featuring Ginuwine. In 2006, Wyatt was released from her contract with Cash Money Records, citing conflict with management as the reason for her departure. "Ghetto Rose" and "Who Knew?" were both released as singles, but not until she released 2007's Ghetto Rose and 2010's Who Knew?, respectively.

== Recorded songs ==
List of recorded songs for the album between 2004-2005

1. Cheaters
2. Emotional Rollercoaster (featuring Ginuwine)
3. Getting It
4. Ghetto Rose
5. I'll Never Do It Again
6. Insecurity
7. Inspiration
8. Look at What You Made Me Do
9. My Man
10. Peace On Earth
11. Put Your Hands on Me
12. Shining
13. Six Questions (featuring Avant)
14. This, That, and the Third
15. Without You
16. Whole Lotta Nerve
17. Who Knew?
18. Who Knows
19. Won't Do It Again
20. Your Precious Love (featuring Avant)
