= Ke'Ke' =

EP by Keke Wyatt
- Released: May 6, 2014
- Length: 20:48
- Label: NorthStar; Aratek

Keke Wyatt chronology
Unbelievable (2011)	Ke'Ke' (2014)	Rated Love (2016)

Singles from Ke'Ke'
- 1. "Fall in Love" Released: May 7, 2014

Ke'Ke' is the first extended play by American R&B singer Keke Wyatt. It was released by The NorthStar Group and Aratek Entertainment on May 6, 2014. Her first release since her third studio album, Unbelievable (2011), it features five newly-written and produced songs, including the single, "Fall in Love".

== Promotion ==
Lead single "Fall in Love" reached number 20 on the US Billboard Bubbling Under Hot 100, and number 17 on the Hot R&B/Hip-Hop Singles & Tracks chart.

== Commercial performance ==
By April 2016, Ke'Ke' had sold 20,000 copies in the United States.

== Track listing ==
Ke'Ke' track listing
No.	Title	Writer(s)	Producer(s)	Length
1.	"Fall in Love"	Keke Wyatt; Robert Erness	Erness	3:53
2.	"Rain" (featuring Pusha T)	Wyatt; Brandon Hesson; Terrence Thornton; Shantee Tyler	Hesson	3:58
3.	"Another Lifetime"	Claude Kelly	Chuck Harmony	4:16
4.	"Remember" (featuring Nitty Scott, MC)			3:40
5.	"Lie Under You"			5:01
Total length:				20:48

== Charts ==
Weekly chart performance for Ke'Ke'
Chart (2014)	Peak position
US Billboard 200	190
US Independent Albums (Billboard)	35
US Top R&B/Hip-Hop Albums (Billboard)	25

== Release history ==
Ke'Ke' release history
Region	Date	Format	Label	Ref.
Various	May 6, 2014	CD; digital download	NorthStar; Aratek	
