= Used to Love (Keke Wyatt song) =

Single by Keke Wyatt

from the album Soul Sista
- Released: August 2001
- Recorded: 2001
- Genre: R&B, soul
- Length: 4:13
- Label: MCA
- Songwriter(s): Steve 'Stone' Huff
- Producer(s): Steve 'Stone' Huff

Keke Wyatt singles chronology
| "My First Love" (2000) | "Used to Love" (2001) | "Nothing in This World" (2001) |

"Used to Love" is the first solo single by American R&B singer Keke Wyatt released as the lead single taken from her debut album Soul Sista (2001). The song was released through MCA Records and on August 28, 2001. The song was written and produced by Steve 'Stone' Huff.

It served as the follow-up to Wyatt's duet with Avant, titled "My First Love" (2000). The song failed to make impact on the Billboard Hot 100, however the single peaked at number sixty five on the Hot R&B/Hip-Hop Songs chart.

== Critical reception ==
John Bush from AllMusic described the song in a review of the album stating "Used to Love" rides a nice groove, with heavily synthesized horns and light scratching, while Wyatt vamps over the production."

== Music video ==
The music video was released in 2001. On June 16, 2009, the music video was uploaded to Wyatt's Vevo channel.

== Chart performance ==
The song peaked at number 65 on the Hot R&B/Hip-Hop Songs chart on August 18, 2001, and spent three weeks on the chart respectively.

== Track listings and formats ==
US vinyl single

1. "Used to Love" (Main Version) – 4:12
2. "Used to Love" (Instrumental) – 4:12
3. "Used to Love" (Radio Edit) – 3:53
4. "Used to Love" (Acappella) – 4:46

US CD single

1. "Used to Love" (Radio Edit) – 3:53
2. "Used to Love" (Instrumental) – 4:12

== Charts ==
| Chart (2001) | Peak position |
|---|---|
| US Hot R&B/Hip-Hop Songs (Billboard) | 65 |
