= Fall in Love (Keke Wyatt song) =

Single by Keke Wyatt

from the album Ke'Ke'
- Released: April 25, 2014
- Recorded: 2013–2014
- Length: 3:53
- Label: The NorthStar Group; Aratek Entertainment
- Songwriters: Keke Wyatt and Robert Erness

Keke Wyatt singles chronology
"You & I" (2012)	"Fall in Love" (2014)	"Make Love" (2015)

"Fall in Love" is a song recorded by American R&B singer Keke Wyatt taken from her debut extended play (EP), Ke'Ke' (2014). The song was written by Keke Wyatt and Robert Erness. The song was released through The NorthStar Group and Aratek Entertainment on April 25, 2014 on Amazon and then later May 7, 2014 on iTunes.

== Critical response ==
The song was met with a positive response from critics and journalists.

Andy Kellman from AllMusic described the song as a "career highlight for Wyatt and the set's lead song, is an exception" in a review of the EP Ke'Ke'. ThisIsRnB stated "Keke Wyatt may be just a little crazy, but she can surely sang! The R&B Diva is finally giving fans what they want with the release of the brand new song Fall In Love."

== Music video ==
A in studio performance was released on Wyatt's personal YouTube account on May 9, 2014. As of November 3, 2016 the video has gained over 2.8 million views on YouTube.

== Track listings and formats ==
Digital download

1. "Fall in Love" – 3:53

US CD single

1. "Fall in Love" – 3:53

== Release history ==
Region	Date	Format	Label	Ref
Various	April 25, 2014	Digital download	Aratek Entertainment, INgrooves	
United States	April 25, 2014	CD	Aratek Entertainment, INgrooves	
United States	May 7, 2014	Digital download	Aratek Entertainment, INgrooves	
