= Saturday Love =

1985 single by Cherrelle

- 7-inch US vinyl single

Single by Cherrelle and Alexander O'Neal

from the album High Priority
- B-side: "Will You Satisfy?"
- Released: October 16, 1985
- Recorded: 1985
- Studio: Flyte Tyme Studios (Minneapolis, Minnesota)
- Genre: Pop; R&B; synth-funk
- Length: 5:00 (album version); 4:20 (single version)
- Label: Tabu
- Songwriters: James Harris III; Terry Lewis
- Producers: Jimmy Jam & Terry Lewis

Cherrelle singles chronology
"You Look Good to Me" (1985)	"Saturday Love" (1985)	"Artificial Heart" (1986)

Alexander O'Neal singles chronology
"A Broken Heart Can Mend" (1985)	"Saturday Love" (1985)	"What's Missing" (1986)

"Saturday Love" is a song performed by American R&B singers Cherrelle and Alexander O'Neal. The song was written and produced by Jimmy Jam & Terry Lewis and was released in October 1985. It peaked at No. 2 on the US R&B chart and became a moderate pop hit peaking at No. 26 on the US Hot 100 in the spring of 1986. It reached No. 6 on the UK singles chart, No. 4 on the New Zealand Top 40 and No. 7 on the Irish Singles Chart. The song appeared on Cherrelle's gold album, High Priority on Tabu Records and included an extended spoken dialogue introduction skit set in a bar.

Twenty-two years later, in 2007, O'Neal re-recorded the song for his album Alex Loves..., released in February 2008. This version featured the vocals of Bianca Lindgreen, a long-time friend of O'Neal's. Also in 2008, the special edition EP Saturday Love - 2008 Remixes was released, featuring 11 club/house remixes as well as an a cappella version. O'Neal and Cherrelle reunited and performed the song at the 2011 BET Awards and afterwards presented the Best New Artist Award.

The song has been sampled almost 100 times. This includes both samples and interpolations. Popular songs that sample "Saturday Love" include Junior Jack's "My Feeling", 50 Cent's "I Get It In", SpaceGhostPurrp's "Friday" and Charli XCX's "How Can I Not Know What I Need Right Now".

== Music video ==
While no official music video was actually filmed, the clip was taken from a 1986 episode of the BBC program Top of the Pops.

== Track listing and formats ==
- US 7" Vinyl

A "Saturday Love" – 4:15
B "Will You Satisfy?" – 4:12

- US 12" Vinyl

A1 "Saturday Love" (Extended Version) – 8:45
B1 "Saturday Love" (Acapella) – 3:30
B2 "Saturday Love" (Instrumental) – 4:55

- UK, Europe 12" Vinyl

A "Saturday Love" (Extended Version) – 5:00
B I Didn't Mean to Turn You On" (Extended Version) – 6:21

== Charts ==
=== Weekly charts ===
Chart (1985)	Peak position
New Zealand Recorded Music NZ	4
Ireland IRMA	7
UK Singles (Official Charts)	6
US Billboard Hot 100	26
US Hot R&B/Hip-Hop Songs (Billboard)	2
US Dance Club Songs (Billboard)	13

== Keke Wyatt version ==
"Saturday Love"

Single by Keke Wyatt featuring Ruben Studdard

from the album Unbelievable
- Released: May 24, 2011
- Recorded: 2010–2011
- Genre: R&B
- Length: 3:59
- Label: Shanachie Records
- Songwriter: Jimmy Jam & Terry Lewis
- Producer: "J.R." Hutson

Keke Wyatt singles chronology
"Who Knew?" (2010)	"Saturday Love" (2011)	"Fall in Love" (2014)

"Saturday Love" was recorded by American R&B singer Keke Wyatt, taken from her third studio album Unbelievable (2011). It features Ruben Studdard and was produced by "J.R." Hutson. The song was released as the album's lead single on May 24, 2011 worldwide but did not appear on the US Hot 100.

=== Track listing ===
Digital download

1. "Saturday Love" – 3:59
2. "Saturday Love" (Misfitz Remix) – 3:26

=== Charts ===
Chart (2011)	Peak position
US Adult R&B Songs	31

=== Release history ===
Region	Date	Format	Label	Ref.
Various	May 24, 2011	Digital download	Shanachie	
