= Keke Wyatt =

American singer-songwriter

KeKe Wyatt
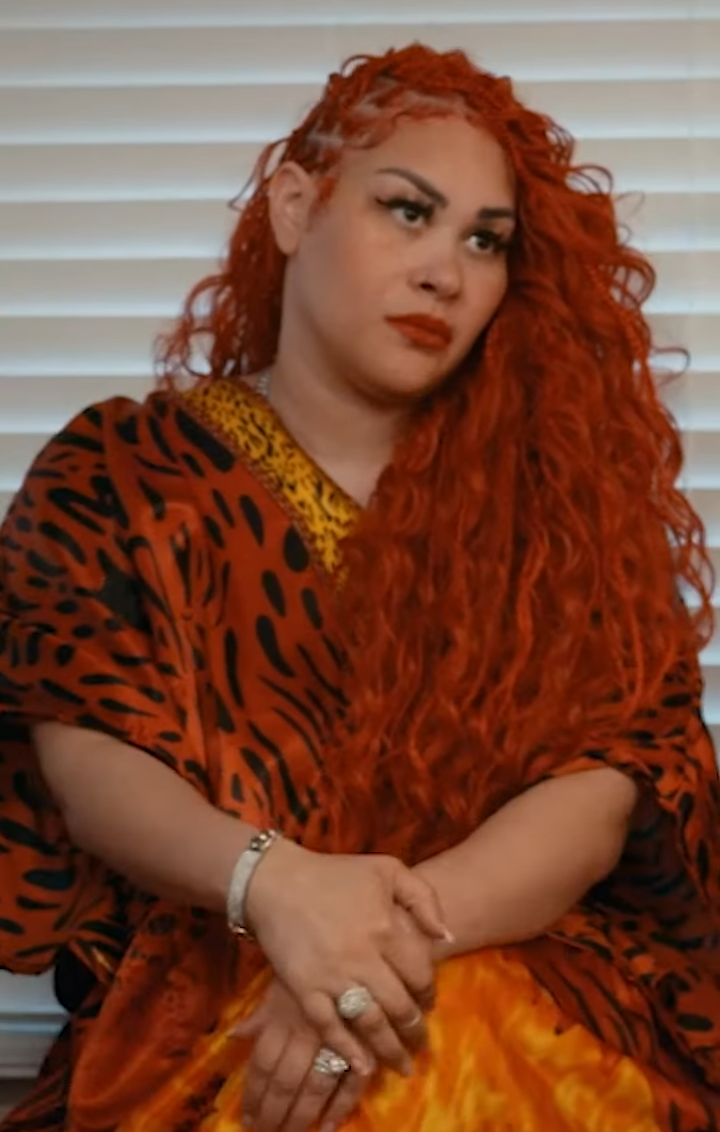
- Wyatt in 2023
- Born: Ke'Tara Wyatt Darring; March 10, 1980 (age 46); Indianapolis, Indiana, U.S.
- Occupations: Singer-songwriter; TV personality
- Years active: 1990–present
- Spouses: Rahmat Morton (m. 2000; div. 2009) Michael Ford (m. 2010; div. 2018) Zackariah Darring (m. 2018; div. 2024)
- Children: 10
- Musical career
- Genres: R&B; soul; gospel
- Instruments: Vocals; drums; keyboards
- Labels: MCA (2001–2004); Cash Money/Universal (2004–2006); TVT (2006–2008); Shanachie (2009–2013); Aratek Entertainment/ Fontana (2012–present)
- Website: Official Twitter

Ke'Tara Shavon "Keke" Wyatt (born March 10, 1980) (Note: Many sources claim her birth year to be 1982. However an Indianapolis Star article from February 2001 lists her age as 21. This article also mentions that she was 12 in August 1992. This implies a 1980 birth year.) is an American singer-songwriter and TV personality. After performing in a number of girl bands and working as a songwriter during her teenage years, in 2000 she garnered national attention after her successful collaboration with fellow R&B singer Avant, In 2001 her rendition of "Nothing in This World" led to a nomination for the Best New R&B/Soul/Rap Artist award at the Soul Train Lady of Soul Awards. After a number of charting collaborations and solo releases, in 2012 she starred as a cast member in TV One's R&B Divas: Atlanta, which featured the lives of five 1990s chart-topping R&B singers. She was featured in all 3 seasons of the show. She also performed with the group at events such as Essence Music Festival.

In her career, Wyatt released official studio albums, including Soul Sista (2001), Who Knew? (2010), Unbelievable (2011), and her latest and recent release, Rated Love (2016). All of these albums charted prominently on Billboard, as did her first and only EP release, Ke'Ke' (2014). Wyatt has also released a number of charting singles, with the lead single "Sexy Song" from the album Rated Love peaking at number 29 on the Adult R&B Songs chart. After getting involved with a number of non-profits, Wyatt served as a spokesperson for the National Coalition Against Domestic Violence (NCADV).

== Early life and education ==
Wyatt was born March 10, 1980, or 1982, in Indianapolis, to Lorna Wyatt, a vocalist and Keever Wyatt II, an organist and also a vocalist. Ke'Tara "Keke" Wyatt was raised in a musical family rooted in gospel music. She has four brothers. Despite her religious background, Wyatt was also exposed to Contemporary R&B and secular music, and she would perform with her vocals in genres as diverse as gospel, pop and opera. Wyatt began singing at the age of 2, experiencing her first live show by the age of 5. While of mixed white and black heritage, Wyatt and her four brothers, who were raised in a predominantly African-American household and community setting, identify as African-American. Wyatt grew up in Indianapolis, but also spent time in both Kentucky and Texas. She attended high school in Indianapolis, where she was a member of her high school's varsity wrestling team. As she grew, her musical tastes were influenced by the likes of R&B greats like Stevie Wonder, Donny Hathaway and Ella Fitzgerald. Inspired by many preceding musical greats, Wyatt found herself performing with various girl groups as a teen. She was often recognized for a maturity exceeding her teenage years.

== Career ==
=== 1992–1999: Early singing and songwriting ===
Wyatt's professional career began at the age of ten, when she began recording a song, called "What If", which would be included on a gospel compilation album for Indianapolis-based R.H. Duncan. With growing buzz surrounding "the little girl who could sing", news of Wyatt's talent led her to encounter with these artists from the likes of Bill Woodson, Nathan Alexander, Billy Badd, Chris Kelly, and multi-platinum producer, composer Jorge Corante and Emmanuel Officer. During the years of adolescence, Wyatt became as a student of a school by the Chicago-based producer and songwriter Steve "Stone" Huff. Huff eventually produced and shopped a few of Wyatt's demos in hopes of landing her a record deal. During her mid-teens, she performed demo songs for various gospel labels, earning around $1,500 per recording. During that time, Keke extended her skills by also writing music as a teenager, and while she was writing some music, Keke would experience her first coldly dealt disappointment as a music industry professional. She wrote the majority of the lyrics for a hit song but received no credit for her work.

=== 2000–2002: First hit single, Breakthrough and debut album Soul Sista ===
At age 20, Wyatt recorded "My First Love" with Avant which was released two years later, eventually becoming a single for his album entitled My Thoughts. Wyatt gained much notoriety for the remake of the 1980s ballad by Rene & Angela. Its success, remaining in the top 10 for several weeks, resulted in a solo album contract with MCA Records. With the help of the late MCA Records executive Louil Silas, her friend and A&R Randy Jackson, whom she met at age twelve, and former Boyz II Men manager Quadri El Amin, Wyatt recorded her first album within two weeks time.

Her first single, "Used to Love", helped to create buzz but failed to achieve radio play, though it did chart at No. 65 on the Hot R&B/Hip-Hop Singles & Tracks chart. The follow-up single "Nothing in This World", her second duet with Avant, charted higher on a number of Billboard charts, including No. 4 on the Hot R&B/Hip-Hop Singles & Tracks chart, No. 27 on the Billboard Hot 100 chart, and No. 35 on the Rhythmic Top 40 chart.

Soul Sista, her solo debut in 2001, a platinum album, was released on November 13, 2001. It reached number 33 on the Billboard 200. Selling more than one million copies, Wyatt's fanbase broadened to audiences in Japan, South Korea and Europe. On December 11, 2001, Wyatt was interviewed. During that interview, Wyatt said that she was a founding member of an early incarnation of Destiny's Child, called "The Dolls" and that she was later replaced by Beyoncé. In 2002, her rendition of "Nothing in This World" led to a nomination for Best New R&B/Soul/Rap Artist at the Soul Train Lady of Soul Awards.

=== 2004–2008: Label change, Emotional Rollercoaster and Ghetto Rose ===
By 2004, Wyatt had departed from MCA Records. She signed a contract, negotiated by her ex-husband/road manager Rahmat Morton, with Cash Money Records/Universal Motown Records, under the management of Cassandra Ware. Her second album Emotional Rollercoaster was originally set for release on May 31, 2005, but was postponed for release in early 2006. The set's first single, "Put Your Hands on Me", became the most added urban track to radio in April 2005. However, the single failed to chart or gain radio airplay, and her album was, subsequently, shelved. Beyond the first single, other songs slated to appear on her second album included "Look at What You Made Me Do", "Insecurity" written by Bryan Michael Cox, "My Man", "Six Questions" featuring Avant, "Cheaters", "Who Knows" written by Tank, "Peace on Earth", a remake of a Rachelle Ferrell single, and the title track "Emotional Rollercoaster" featuring Ginuwine. In 2006, Wyatt was released from her contract with Cash Money Records, citing conflict with management as the reason for her departure.

In 2007 Wyatt, reunited with her former manager Quadri El Amin on the TVT Records label. Work on her third solo album Ghetto Rose was completed in 2007. The title track, written by veteran songwriter Franne Golde along with Kasey Livingston and Curt Schneider, was released to urban radio outlets in the fall of that year. The album was originally set for release on October 23, 2007, but was postponed for release in early 2008. Then, in February 2008, the record label filed for bankruptcy and, for the second time in her solo career, Wyatt's album was shelved.

=== 2009–2011: Theatre debut, Who Knew? and Unbelievable ===
In 2009, Wyatt played a leading role in a United States-based nationally touring production entitled Love Overboard. The production also included many seasoned cast members such as actress Karen Malina White, singer Avant, actor Khalil Kain, and others.

Wyatt released the single "Who Knew?" in 2010, which served as the title track for her album Who Knew?, released on February 23, 2010 through Shanachie Records. On the US Billboard Top R&B/Hip-Hop Albums, the album peaked at No. 35. In May 2011, Wyatt released a remake of the popular 1980s single "Saturday Love", featuring Ruben Studdard. Shortly afterwards, she also released a music video for the track through Shanachie Records. "Saturday Love" was included in her second album on Shanachie, Unbelievable!, which was released on June 14, 2011. It peaked at No. 48 on the R&B Albums chart.

=== 2012–2014: Appearance on reality TV series R&B Divas and the album Ke'Ke' ===
In 2012, Wyatt was cast in TV One's R&B Divas which features the lives of five 1990s chart-topping R&B singers including Wyatt, Faith Evans, Nicci Gilbert, Monifah and Syleena Johnson. The show documents the singers living in Atlanta, Georgia, as they work towards rebuilding their careers. The first episode aired on August 20, 2012.

Throughout the show, R&B Divas singers collaborated on a charity album commemorating the life of Whitney Houston, featuring the single "Love Yourself" which is also featured in the TV show's introduction. Proceeds of the album went towards benefiting organizations committed to improving the lives of women. She performed at the 2012 Essence Music Festival in New Orleans along with the other cast-members of R&B Divas, and according to Erika Ramirez of Billboard in a ranking of the top ten performances at the festival, "Keke Wyatt's cover of Houston's 'I Wanna Dance With Somebody' left the audience in awe even after the performance." After the initial season of R&B Divas, Wyatt appeared in the two following seasons as well, when the show was renamed to R&B Divas: Atlanta.

External videos
- Avant ft. Keke Wyatt - "You & I" Music Video (VEVO, January 4, 2013)
- Keke Wyatt - "Lie Under You" Music Video (YouTube, August 3, 2015)

In 2013, she collaborated with Avant on their hit "You & I", which peaked at No. 1 on Billboard's Urban A/C chart, and remained there close to two months. "You & I" also reached No. 33 on the Hot R&B/Hip-Hop Songs chart.

In May 2014, Wyatt released her first EP titled Ke'Ke', through The NorthStar Group and her own imprint Aratek Entertainment. The imprint is her birth name backwards, and is also meant as a stand-in for the word erotic.

The EP featured songwriters and producers such as Neyo, Chuck Harmony, Claude Kelly, and Cristyle, while other guest artists include Pusha T on the track "Rain", and Nitty Scott in "Remember". Overall, the EP contains five newly written and produced songs, and the single "Fall in Love" reached No. 20 on the Bubbling Under Hot 100 and No. 17 on the Hot R&B/Hip-Hop Songs chart. On the Billboard 200, the EP reached number 191, R&B Albums chart, the EP peaked at No. 12 in late June 2014, and it also reached No. 35 on the Independent Albums chart.

In August 2014, Wyatt made a cameo in fellow R&B Divas co-star Faith Evans' music video "I Deserve It", featuring Missy Elliott and Sharaya J. Later that year, Wyatt was featured as a vocalist on the track "Make Love" by Faith Evans.

=== 2015–2017: Rated Love and Keke Covers ===
In the fall of 2015, she signed a multi-album distribution deal for her Aratek Entertainment company with INgrooves Music Group, announcing then-upcoming promo singles. On November 20, 2015, she released her new R&B single "Sexy Song". The track is set to be the lead single from her album Rated Love, which was released through Aratek Entertainment on April 22, 2016. "Sexy Song" was at No. 26 on the Adult R&B Songs chart as of early December 2015. "Love Me" was released as the album's second single on March 18, 2016.

In August 2016, it was announced that she and her husband Michael Ford had joined the cast of the sixth season of Marriage Boot Camp: Reality Stars set for an October airdate. On October 13, 2016, Wyatt announced the single "Jodeci" on her Instagram account, writing: "I think we got a new one with my new single Jodeci!!! I wanna know what ya'll think", revealing it would be released with a deluxe version of her album Rated Love on October 21, 2016.

It was announced on January 31, 2017, via Wyatt's social media accounts that a covers album Keke Covers would be released on February 14, 2017, "My YouTube cover series #kekecovers comes the cover album 'Keke Covers' #COMINGSOON #FEB14 #LOVERSDAY2017".

=== 2017–present: Country Fried Soul, KeKe Wyatt's World, Water into Wine ===
On July 28, 2017, Wyatt released the single "Summertime", intended to be the lead single from her upcoming fifth studio album Country Fried Soul. On July 26, 2023, it was announced that Wyatt would star in her own reality TV series Keke Wyatt's World on WEtv network. The reality series will follow Wyatt, a singer-songwriter and mother of 11 children, as she prepares to release her first new album in over six years. On August 23, 2023, the trailer for Keke Wyatts World was released. Wyatt announced the release of her new single "Water into Wine" on August 25, 2023, from her upcoming album reuniting with former label Shanachie via social media: "Guess what?! My new Single is available NOW!!!!! Giving my SHUGAR's a summer !! feel good appetizer before my album comes out later this year!! You're going to LOVE ALL the new music"

== Advocacy ==
Wyatt has served as a spokesperson for the National Coalition Against Domestic Violence (NCADV). As spokesperson, she shares her experience as a long-term victim of domestic abuse. She is also a supporter of the Saving our Daughters organization.

== Personal life ==
=== Marriage and relationships ===
Wyatt was 18 years old when she married Rahmat Morton, her road manager. A domestic violence situation between Wyatt and Morton was widely reported in the urban news circuit in 2001, with Wyatt explaining that she had stabbed her husband out of self-defense and to protect her children. Wyatt filed for divorce from Morton in 2009 after an escalation of violence, relocating her family from Kentucky to Atlanta, Georgia.

She remarried in 2010 to Michael Jamar Ford, an ordained minister who went to appear with Wyatt in the reality TV show R&B Divas. In early September 2017, it was reported that the couple were divorcing while she was eight months pregnant. Ford confirmed their divorce in August 2018.

In October 2018, Wyatt married her childhood ex-boyfriend, Zackariah Darring. In July 2024, Wyatt announced that she and Darring were divorced after five years of marriage, and claimed that he had been abusive toward her.

=== Children ===
Wyatt has a total of ten children. Her first four children are from her first marriage with Rahmat Morton: sons Keyver (born 2000), Rahjah (2002), and daughter Ke'Tarah (born 2008). Her fourth child, a daughter named Heaven (2009), was still birth. During her second marriage with Michael Jamar Ford, she gave birth to four additional children: sons Ke'Mar (born 2010) and Wyatt (born 2012), daughter Ke'Yoshi (2015), and son Kendall (2017). During her third marriage with Zackariah Darring, she gave birth to two sons: Ke'Riah (2020) and Ke'Zyah (2022). Ke'Zyah was diagnosed with Trisomy 13, a rare genetic disorder.

=== Legal issues ===
In September 2026, Wyatt was arrested in Henry County, Georgia, on charges of terroristic threats, cruelty to children, and simple assault. She spent two days in jail and was released after posting a $1,050 bond. Her representatives have denied that she was charged with terroristic threats or cruelty to children, contrary to her booking information.

== Awards and nominations ==
Year	Award	Nominated work	Category	Result
2002	Soul Train Lady of Soul Awards	"Nothing in This World" (Keke Wyatt ft. Avant)	Best New R&B/Soul/Rap Artist	Nominated

== Discography ==
- Soul Sista (2001)
- Who Knew? (2010)
- Unbelievable (2011)
- Rated Love (2016)
- Keke Covers (2017)

== Filmography and theater ==
Selected roles and cameos by Keke Wyatt
Year	Title	Format	Publisher	Role	
2009	Love Overboard	Touring theater production	Je'Caryous Johnson	Leading role	
2012-14	R&B Divas: Atlanta	Reality TV series	TV One	Central character	
2014	"I Deserve It"	Faith Evans music video	BMG	Cameo	
2016	Marriage Boot Camp: Reality Stars season six	Reality TV series	WE tv	Central character	
2017–2023	"Saints & Sinners"	TV Drama Series	Bounce TV	Lady Azia Greene	6 episodes
2023	Keke Wyatt's World	Reality TV series	WE tv	Central character	

== See also ==
- Keke Wyatt discography
- List of songs recorded by Keke Wyatt
- List of soul musicians
