= Nothing in This World (Keke Wyatt song) =

Single by Keke Wyatt featuring Avant

from the album Soul Sista
- Released: 2001
- Recorded: 2001
- Genre: R&B, soul
- Length: 4:11
- Label: MCA
- Songwriter: Steve 'Stone' Huff
- Producer: Steve 'Stone' Huff

Keke Wyatt singles chronology
"Used to Love" (2001)	"Nothing in This World" (2001)	"I Don't Wanna" (2002)

"Nothing in This World" is song by American R&B singer Keke Wyatt featuring American R&B singer Avant released as the second single taken from her debut album Soul Sista (2002). The song was released on December 4, 2001 through MCA Records. The song was written and produced by Steve 'Stone' Huff. The music video was directed by Aaron Courseault.

It served as Wyatt's second duet with Avant, which followed her first duet with Avant called "My First Love" (2000). The song "Nothing in This World" peaked at number twenty seven on the Billboard Hot 100 and at number four on the Hot R&B/Hip-Hop Songs chart.

== Chart performance ==
On March 9, 2002, the song peaked at number 27 on the Billboard Hot 100 chart spending eleven weeks on the Hot 100. The song also charted at number three on the Hot R&B/Hip-Hop Airplay chart spending twenty weeks on the chart, number four on the Hot R&B/Hip-Hop Songs chart spending twenty two weeks on the chart and number 25 on the Top Radio Songs chart spending nineteen weeks on the chart. On March 23, 2002, the song peaked at number thirty five on the Rhythmic Songs chart spending two weeks on the chart.

== Track listings and formats ==
U.S. CD/Vinyl single

1. "Nothing In This World" (LP Version) – 4:12
2. "Nothing In This World" (Instrumental) – 4:13
3. "Nothing In This World" (Radio Edit) – 4:01
4. "Nothing In This World" (Acappella) – 3:40

== Charts ==
=== Weekly charts ===
Chart (2002)	Peak position
US R&B/Hip-Hop Airplay	3
US Hot R&B/Hip-Hop Songs	4
US Billboard Hot 100	27
US Rhythmic Songs	35

=== Year-end charts ===
Chart (2002)	Peak position
US Hot R&B/Hip-Hop Songs	22
