= Soul Sista =

Studio album by KeKe Wyatt
- Released: November 13, 2001
- Length: 42:26
- Label: MCA
- Producer: Steve "Stone" Huff

KeKe Wyatt chronology
| Soul Sista (2001) | Who Knew? (2010) |

Singles from Soul Sista
- 1. "Used to Love" Released: August 28, 2001; 2. "Nothing in This World" Released: December 4, 2001; 3. "I Don't Wanna" Released: April 16, 2002

Soul Sista is the debut studio album by American singer KeKe Wyatt. It was released on November 13, 2001, by MCA Records. The album's writing and production was entirely credited to Steve "Stone" Huff. Soul Sista debuted at number 33 on the US Billboard 200. It has been certified gold by the Recording Industry Association of America (RIAA) for shipments of 500,000 copies within the United States.

== Promotion ==
Wyatt promoted tSoul Sista extensively by performing promotional concerts within the United States. In October 2001, she launched the KeKe Wyatt: Live Tour, which went on to do 50 shows throughout the United States and United Kingdom, ending in July 2002. After the tour, Wyatt continued the promotion by appearing on several talk shows and red carpets.

== Critical reception ==
Professional ratings
Review scores
| Source | Rating |
|---|---|
| AllMusic | 2.5/5 stars |

Natasha Washington, writing for The Oklahoman, found that "Wyatt's sleek yet gritty work brings to mind Mary J. Blige, Faith Evans, Missy "Misdemeanor" Elliott and other hip-hop-influenced urban singers who emerged in the 1990s. Her [...] song lineup includes the inspired, midtempo "Don't Take Your Love" and "I Don't Wanna," a serious soul adventure song. Soul Sista shows promise, and Wyatt shines as a potential new artist." Billboard also compared Wyatt to then-labelmate Blige, writing: "Wyatt’s strength lies in her ability to convey emotional tales of love and life [...] At the end of the day, Soul Sista seems to be just the tip of the iceberg for this burgeoning talent." In a mixed review, John F. Butland from Exclaim! remarked: "If she's smart, next time around [...] she'll stamp a little more of herself onto the record, because her vocals are the only facet that rises above the mundane."

AllMusic editor John Bush rated the album two and a half stars out of five. He wrote that Soul Sista "adds little to the repertoire of Macy Gray, Erykah Badu, and Jill Scott, though Wyatt's strong voice and admirable range save the album from itself." Bush felt that Wyatt's "performances are good throughout, but too many tracks on Soul Sista rely on the retread blueprint for late-'90s R&B [...] Most of the blame goes to impresario Steve "Stone" Huff, who wrote all but one of the songs, produced and arranged every track, and played every note heard on the album." Similarly, PopMatters remarked: "Soul Sista is an example of what happens when a good voice is subjected to bad music and overdone concepts. Still, there is some evidence that KeKe Wyatt is beyond the candy-coated type of rhythm and blues that has ruled the airwaves over the last decade. Her debut does little to set her apart from other singers, but it will interesting to see if she lives up to being a true soul sista the next time around."

== Commercial performance ==
Soul Sista debuted and peaked at number 33 on the US Billboard 200 and number five on Billboard's US Top R&B/Hip-Hop Albums chart. On March 13, 2002, it was certified Gold by the Recording Industry Association of America (RIAA) for shipments figures in excess of over 500,000 copies. By August 2006, the album had sold 566,000 copies in the United States, according to Nielsen SoundScan.

== Track listing ==
All tracks produced by Steve "Stone" Huff.

| No. | Title | Writer(s) | Length |
|---|---|---|---|
| 1. | "Used to Love" | Steve "Stone" Huff | 4:13 |
| 2. | "I Don't Wanna" | Huff | 3:56 |
| 3. | "Nothing in This World" (featuring Avant) | Huff; Myron Avant | 4:11 |
| 4. | "Don't Take Your Love" | Huff | 4:13 |
| 5. | "I Can't Wait" (featuring Avant) | Huff; Avant | 4:16 |
| 6. | "Push Me Away" | Huff | 4:21 |
| 7. | "If Only You Knew" | Cynthia Biggs; Dexter Wansel; Kenneth Gamble | 4:34 |
| 8. | "Talkin 'Bout Love" | Huff | 4:27 |
| 9. | "Bad Boy" (featuring Haz-1 and Steve "Stone" Huff) | Huff; Avant | 3:52 |
| 10. | "Call on Me" | Huff | 4:23 |

== Charts ==
=== Weekly charts ===
Weekly chart performance for Soul Sista
| Chart (2002) | Peak position |
|---|---|
| US Billboard 200 | 33 |
| US Top R&B/Hip-Hop Albums (Billboard) | 5 |

=== Year-end charts ===
Year-end chart performance for Soul Sista
| Chart (2002) | Position |
|---|---|
| US Billboard 200 | 147 |
| US Top R&B/Hip-Hop Albums (Billboard) | 24 |

== Certifications ==
Certifications for Soul Sista
| Region | Certification | Certified units/sales |
|---|---|---|
| United States (RIAA) | Gold | 500,000^{^} |
^{^} Shipments figures based on certification alone.
