= R&B Divas: Atlanta =

- Genre: Reality
- Created by: Nicci Gilbert-Daniels
- Starring: Nicci Gilbert; Monifah Carter; Syleena Johnson; Keke Wyatt; Faith Evans; Angie Stone; LaTocha Scott; LaTavia Roberson; Kameelah Williams
- Theme music composer: R&B Divas cast
- Opening theme: "Sistah's In Song"
- Country of origin: United States
- No. of seasons: 3
- No. of episodes: 30

Production
- Executive producers: Nicci Gilbert; Leslie Greif; Adam Reed; Adam Freeman; Phil Thornton; Paul Coy Allen; Aaron Fishman; David St. John; Faith Evans; Jubba Seyyid (Network)
- Producer: Lamar Chase
- Running time: 41–43 minutes
- Production company: Thinkfactory Media

Original release
- Network: TV One
- Release: August 20, 2012 – July 9, 2014

Related
- R&B Divas: Los Angeles

R&B Divas: Atlanta (formerly titled R&B Divas) is an American reality television series that premiered TV One starring several R&B singers. The show offers an inside look at how the award-winning singers balance their music careers and personal lives as they work towards producing an album in memory of Whitney Houston. The series premiered on August 20, 2012, with the premiere delivering a ratings record for TV One, with almost 900,000 viewers tuning in for the show's first episode.

In February 2013, a spin-off titled R&B Divas: Los Angeles was announced. The cast includes Lil Mo, Chante Moore, Kelly Price, Claudette Ortiz, Michel'le and Dawn Robinson. The eight-episode first season premiered on July 10, 2013. In the second season Chrisette Michelle and Leela James joined the cast after the departures of Kelly Price and Dawn Robinson

R&B and soul singer Angie Stone and LaTocha Scott, formerly of the R&B group Xscape, joined the cast for season 2. On November 18, 2013, the series was renewed for a third season. Season 3 premiered on April 23, 2014, with LaTavia Roberson and Kameelah Williams joining the cast. Syleena Johnson, Angie Stone, Monifah Carter and Keke Wyatt are returning. On January 14, 2015, the series was cancelled after three seasons.

== Synopsis ==
R&B Divas: Atlanta stars singers Monifah Carter, Faith Evans, Nicci Gilbert, Syleena Johnson and KeKe Wyatt. The first season chronicles their friendships, professional endeavors and personal lives as they work, play and struggle to get their lives and careers back on track. Spurred by Evans, the quintet comes together to produce a charity album inspired by Whitney Houston. Proceeds from the album will benefit the Whitney E. Houston Academy of Creative and Performing Arts in East Orange, New Jersey. The show deals with a candid look at other career and personal issues affecting the singers, including motherhood, divorce, alcohol, physical abuse and sexuality. Originally titled Ladies of R&B, R&B Divas: Atlanta is filmed primarily in Atlanta, with additional shooting in Washington, D.C., New York City and New Orleans.

== Cast ==
=== Overview ===
Divas	Seasons		
Divas	1	2	3
Monifah Carter	Main		
Syleena Johnson	Main		
Keke Wyatt	Main		
Faith Evans	Main		
Nicci Gilbert	Main		
Angie Stone		Main	
LaTocha Scott		Main	
LaTavia Roberson			Main
Kameelah Williams			Main

== Episodes ==
Season	Episodes	Originally released	
Season	Episodes	First released	Last released
1	8	August 20, 2012	October 8, 2012
2	10	May 1, 2013	July 10, 2013
3	12	April 23, 2014	July 9, 2014

=== Season 1 (2012) ===
No. overall	No. in season	Title	Original release date	U.S. viewers (millions)
1	1	"Sisters in Song"	August 20, 2012	N/A
2	2	"Mothers, Models, and Divas"	August 27, 2012	N/A
3	3	"Labor Pains"	September 3, 2012	N/A
4	4	"DC Or Bust"	September 10, 2012	N/A
5	5	"You Can't Hold a Diva Down"	September 17, 2012	N/A
6	6	"A Time to Heal"	September 24, 2012	N/A
7	7	"Empire State of Mind"	October 1, 2012	N/A
8	8	"Essence of a Diva"	October 8, 2012	N/A

=== Season 2 (2013) ===
No. overall	No. in season	Title	Original release date	U.S. viewers (millions)
-	-	"R&B Divas Pre-Party"	April 13, 2013	N/A
The special, hosted by Joe Claire, updates viewers about what the cast of R&B Divas has been up to since the finale of season one.
9	1	"Get to Stepp'n"	May 1, 2013	N/A
10	2	"Oil and Water"	May 8, 2013	N/A
11	3	"Work It Diva"	May 15, 2013	N/A
12	4	"So So Diva"	May 22, 2013	N/A
13	5	"A Good Day To Cry Hard"	May 29, 2013	N/A
14	6	"Faith No More"	June 5, 2013	N/A
15	7	"Divas Last Stand"	June 12, 2013	N/A
16	8	"Till Divas Do Us Part"	June 19, 2013	N/A
17	9	"The Reunion Part One"	June 26, 2013	N/A
18	10	"The Reunion Part Two"	July 10, 2013	N/A

=== Season 3 (2014) ===
No. overall	No. in season	Title	Original release date	U.S. viewers (millions)
19	1	"Engagement to Enragement"	April 23, 2014	0.18
20	2	"Uncomfortable in My Skin"	April 30, 2014	0.17
21	3	"Diamond in the Rough"	May 7, 2014	0.09
22	4	"Releasing the Diva Demons"	May 14, 2014	0.14
23	5	"Grammy Don't Play That"	May 21, 2014	0.14
24	6	"No Good Deed Goes Unpunished"	May 28, 2014	0.15
25	7	"Can't I Just Be Keke"	June 4, 2014	0.18
26	8	"Divas Make It Rain"	June 11, 2014	0.15
27	9	"California Love"	June 18, 2014	0.20
28	10	"Gett'n Married Now"	June 25, 2014	0.24
29	11	"Reunion (Part One)"	July 2, 2014	N/A
30	12	"Reunion (Part Two)"	July 9, 2014	0.56
