= Piece of Your Love =

2026 single by Rod Wave

Single by Rod Wave

from the album Don't Look Down
- Released: June 26, 2026
- Length: 3:45
- Label: Alamo; Sony Music
- Songwriters: Rodarius Green; Thomas Horton; Monte Moir; Anthony Fields; Earl Simmons; Antonio Ramos; Jeremiah Dickerson
- Producers: TnTXD; TrillGotJuice; J Wavy

Rod Wave singles chronology
"Feed the Streets" (2026)	"Piece of Your Love" (2026)	"Hustle" (2026)

Music video
- "Piece of Your Love" on YouTube

"Piece of Your Love" is a song by the American rapper Rod Wave, released on June 26, 2026, as the lead single from his seventh album Don't Look Down (2026). Produced by TnTXD, TrillGotJuice and J Wavy, it is a melodic rap song dealing with heartbreak and forbidden love. The song contains a sample of "If You Were Here Tonight" by singer Alexander O'Neal.

== Critical reception ==
Gabriel Bras Nevares of HotNewHipHop gave a positive review, calling it a "promising" single for the album and a "beautiful love song". He also wrote, "Rod Wave loves himself a good ballad, and 'Piece Of Your Love' ranks among his sweetest. If you need something sentimental this weekend, definitely give this a listen."

== Charts ==
Chart performance for "Piece of Your Love"
Chart (2026)	Peak position
US Billboard Hot 100	40
US Hot R&B/Hip-Hop Songs (Billboard)	10
