= Don't Look Down (Rod Wave album) =

Studio album by Rod Wave
- Released: August 28, 2026
- Genre: Hip-hop
- Length: 69:00
- Label: Alamo
- Producers: Alex Made This Beat; Benny Henny; Box Head Beats; Brazzy; Cam Grey; Camm; Chi Chi; Cybr; Dmac; Draka; DrellOnTheTrack; EELmatic; Evrgrn; GodBlessYrzTrly; Gucceo; Hank Compton; Jamie McLaughlin; Jarvo; Jay Versace; Jaywavy; JB Sauced Up; Jordjii; Kado Beats; klutchfrenchie; Korren Mason; Malik Ninety Five; Moneyxo; MST; Neeko Made This; Onyx; PASDECHANCE; Prodbykyris; Producedbyemo; Rippa On The Beat; Ryan Bevolo; Scott Parker; Shaad K'Rounds; T5; Tahj Money; Ties; TnTXD; Travis Harrington; TrellGotWings; Triangle Park; TrillGotJuice; Trillo Beats; Williskeating; XVL; Yung Tago; Zach Crowell; Znayshi

Rod Wave chronology
Last Lap (2024)	Don't Look Down (2026)

Singles from Don't Look Down
- 1. "Feed the Streets" Released: December 25, 2025; 2. "Piece of Your Love" Released: June 26, 2026; 3. "Hustle" Released: July 31, 2026

Professional ratings
Review scores
Source	Rating
AllMusic	3.5/5 stars

Don't Look Down is the seventh studio album by American rapper and singer Rod Wave. It was released on August 28, 2026, through Alamo Records. The album features guest appearances from Aimee Carty, Hazlett, Luv Von, and Summer Joy, while its production was primarily handled by Dmac and TnTXD, with support from Chi Chi, EELmatic, Evrgrn, GodBlessYrzTrly, Gucceo, Shaad K'Rounds, Travis Harrington, TrellGotWings, TrillGotJuice, and several other producers. The album served as a follow-up to his sixth studio album, Last Lap (2024).

It debuted at number one on the US Billboard 200 chart, selling 99,000 album-equivalent units, 9,000 of which were pure album sales. The album serves as Green's fourth chart-topper and his eighth consecutive top ten on the chart; sixteen of the album's twenty-four tracks charted on the Billboard Hot 100, making Green the twenty-fourth artist in history to chart a hundred songs on the chart. It was supported by three official singles: "Feed the Streets", "Piece of Your Love" and "Hustle".

== Background and recording ==
Green first spoke about the album in an August 2025 interview with Billboard in which he spoke about the album's background and its potential release–teasing an October/November 2025 release before eventually rescheduling.

As far as the new album, I’m about 85 percent done with it. Growth. I feel like every album, as I grow older, is different. I paint a different picture, because I’m a different version of myself. Every album’s a different chapter. I feel like it’s all real life stuff. We all can agree that life goes up and down. So every year, what I basically do is I just talk about where life has taken me up to that point, and people connect with it. We’re all growing up together. People who listened to Ghetto Gospel all the way to SoulFly and Last Lap, these are the same people. From that point to this point, this is what has happened and I feel like that’s why people relate to me so much, because I’m not like a superstar or a fairy tale. We are going through the same thing. We all got some sort of similarity.

Upon the release of Don't Look Down, Green appeared in an interview with Charlamagne tha God on The Breakfast Club in which he spoke about the process of creating the album. When asked about its title, Green noted that the title is a metaphor for his life where he's so far up, he's afraid of falling: "don’t look down… just keep going, keep dreaming". When asked about the record's second cut, "I Am", Green noted that the track is who he is and who he's going to become: "that’s where I was, that’s where I am". Green spoke on his music being described as "pain music", noting that he's trying to stray from that title. When further asked, Green made it clear that the "pain" is him venting whilst he uses the record to document his grief, instead of living in it.

== Release and promotion ==
Green released the album's lead single, "Feed the Streets" on December 25, 2025. The song peaked at number 86 on the Billboard Hot 100. The record's second single, "Piece of Your Love" was released on June 26, reaching a peak of number 40, whilst the third and final single, "Hustle", released on July 31, reached a peak of number 48.

On June 16, Green officially announced the album, releasing a "mournful" trailer and making it available for pre-order. In the trailer, Green said: "no more sneaky business, no more side deals. Keep building our own machine. Keep going and don’t look down".

== Commercial performance ==
In the United States, Don't Look Down debuted at number one on the Billboard 200, earning 99,000 album-equivalent units (including 9,000 in pure sales) in its first week. It became Wave's fourth chart-topper and his eighth top ten on the chart. The album accumulated a total of 95.07 million on-demand streams of its songs.

== Track listing ==
Don't Look Down track listing
No.	Title	Writer(s)	Producer(s)	Length
1.	"Summer Joy Intro" (featuring Summer Joy)	Rodarius Green; Summer Joy Roberts; Merrick Hughes; Roland Orzabal; Ian Stanley	Travis Harrington; Korren Mason; Onyx	1:04
2.	"I Am"	Green; Harrington; Matvey Lokotetskiy; Matthew Taylor; Tahj Vaughn; Jaterrian Hudson; Mick Steinbach; David Manuele	Harrington; Klutchfrenchie; MST; Tahj Money; TrellGotWings; Znayshi; David Manuele^{[a]}	3:12
3.	"Piece of Your Love"	Green; Thomas Horton; Antonio Ramos; Jeremiah Dickerson; Monte Moir; Earl Simmons; Anthony Fields	TnTXD; TrillGotJuice; Jaywavy	3:45
4.	"Hustle"	Green; Horton; Cameron Holmes; David McDowell	TnTXD; Camm; Dmac	2:19
5.	"Look at Me Momma"	Green; Ramos; Alex Tanner; Robert Smorra; Ryan Bevolo	TrillGotJuice; Alex Made This Beat; Draka; Bevolo	2:43
6.	"Feed the Streets"	Green; Lokotetskiy; Taylor; Steinbach; Chidi Osondu	Klutchfrenchie; Znayshi; MST; Chi Chi	2:58
7.	"Mainstay" (featuring Luv Von)	Green; Lavon Mitchell; Hank Compton; Jamie McLaughlin; William Keating	Compton; McLaughlin; Williskeating	4:35
8.	"War Wounds"	Green; Horton; Vaughn; Jarvis Miller; Rashaad Green; Alvaro Garcia	TntXD; Tahj Money; Jarv; Shaad K Rounds; XVL	3:19
9.	"Venusian" (featuring Hazlett)	Green; Harrington; Horton; Lokotetskiy; Vaughn; Taylor; Jonah Glass; Jomo Blose	Harrington; TntXD; Klutchfrenchie; Tahj Money; Cybr; E-Mo	2:39
10.	"TP"	Green; Tarkan Kozluklu; George Alexandrov; Leonardo Sternieri; Niko Schneider; Toren Spears	T5; Jordjii; Gucceo; Neekomadethis; Godblessyrztrly	2:48
11.	"Keep Dancing" (featuring Hazlett)	Green; Mitchell Lewis; Harrington; Sternieri; Spears; Kenneth Whalum; Cameron Blumberg; Fred McFarlane; Henrik Jonzon	Harrington; Gucceo; Godblessyrztrly; Whalum; Cam Grey	2:44
12.	"LaCosa Nostra"	Green; Horton; Kyris Mingo	TnTXD; Prodbykyris	2:31
13.	"One More Time"	Green; Aleksandr Tabensky; Ricardo Toussaint; Scott Parker; Vanessa Wood; Aubrey Graham; Dwayne Carter, Jr.; Francine Golde; Tom Snow; Carl Lilly; Jarvis Mills; Jermaine Preyan; C. Whitacre; Justin Henderson	Harrington; Moneyxo; Rippa on the Beat; Parker; Triangle Park	2:46
14.	"Not New to It"	Green; Trentay Robinson; Kadrian Lewis	Trillo Beatz; Kado Beats	2:32
15.	"The Inspo"	Green; Blumberg; Tabensky	Cam Grey; Moneyxo	3:10
16.	"Overrated"	Green; Trentay Robinson; K. Lewis	Rippa on the Beat; JB Sauced Up	2:39
17.	"2017 (Streamer U)" (featuring Aimee Carty)	Green; Aimee Carty; Lee Speights III	Eelmatic	2:47
18.	"Lost and Insecure"	Green; Toussaint; Jeremy Bradley; Nasir Jones; Joseph A. King; Isaac Slade; Anthony Cruz; Oliver Scott; Ronnie Wilson	Rippa on the Beat; JB Sauced Up	3:37
19.	"Florida Boy"	Green; Speights; Carlos McKinney; Terius Gesteelde-Diamant	Eelmatic	2:40
20.	"Kiss Me (Interlude)"	Green; Vaughn; Amman Nurani; Zach Crowell; Justin Franks; Julie Frost; Edward Sheeran; Ernest Wilson	TnTXD; Tahj Money; Crowell; Evrgrn	3:05
21.	"Dope Girl"	Green; Aaron Tago	Yung Tago	2:12
22.	"Take Care"	Green; Robinson; Braeden Lessane; Kendrell Mattox	Trillo Beatz; Brazzy; DrellOnTheTrack	3:08
23.	"All I Ever Had"	Green; Azean Fish; Bob Marley	Boxhead	2:32
24.	"Toast"	Green; Jahlil Gunter; Malik Sanders; Joshua Ayers; Ties; Luc Charles André Thévoz; Kenneth Robert Lewis; Michael Perretta; Kanye West; David Sheats; DeVon Harris; Don Black; John Barry; Antwan Patton; André Benjamin; Antony Williams	Harrington; Benny Henny; Jay Versace; Malik Ninety Five; Pasdechance; Ties	2:59
Total length:				69:00

Notes

- ^{^[a]} signifies a vocal producer.

Sample credits

- "Summer Joy Intro" contains an interpolation of "Everybody Wants to Rule the World", written by Roland Orzabal, Ian Stanley, and Chris Hughes, as performed by Tears for Fears.
- "Piece of Your Love" contains samples of "If You Were Here Tonight", written by Monte Moir, as performed by Alexander O'Neal.
- "Keep Dancing" contains samples of "Even If It's Lonely", written by Mitchell Lewis, Henrik Jonzon, and Fredrik Häggstam, as performed by Hazlett.
- "One More Time" contains samples of "Dreaming of You", written by Franne Golde and Tom Snow, as performed by Selena; and an interpolation of "Every Girl", written by Dwayne Carter, Aubrey Graham, Jarvis Mills, Jermaine Preyan, Carl Lilly, as performed by Young Money.
- "2017 (Streamer U)" contains samples of "2 Days into College", written and performed by Aimee Carty.
- "Lost & Insecure" contains samples of "You Found Me", written by Isaac Slade and Joe King, as performed by the Fray; and an interpolation of "Life's a Bitch", written by Nasir Jones,Anthony Cruz, Olu Jones, Ronnie Wilson, and Oliver Scott, as performed by Nas and AZ.
- "Florida Boy" contains samples of "Yamaha", written by Terius Nash and Carlos McKinney, as performed by The-Dream.
- "Kiss Me (Interlude)" contains an interpolation of "Kiss Me", written by Ed Sheeran, Justin Franks, and Julie Frost, as performed by Sheeran.
- "All I Ever Had" contains an interpolation of "Redemption Song", written by Bob Marley, as performed by Bob Marley and the Wailers.
- "Toast" contains samples of "Last Call", written by Ye, Michael Perretta, Tony Williams, and Ken Lewis, as performed by Kanye West.

== Personnel ==
Musicians

- Rod Wave – vocals
- Summer Joy – vocals (1)
- Hazlett – vocals (6, 11)
- Aimee Carty – (17)

Technical

- Travis Harrington – mixing
- Vickisha Morency – assistant mixing
- Armani Alejandro George – assistant engineer

== Charts ==
Weekly chart performance for Don't Look Down
Chart (2026)	Peak position
Australian Albums (ARIA)	70
Australian Hip-Hop/R&B Albums (ARIA)	13
New Zealand Albums (RMNZ)	32
US Billboard 200	1
US Top R&B/Hip-Hop Albums (Billboard)	1

== Release history ==
Release dates and formats for Don't Look Down
Region	Date	Label(s)	Format(s)	Edition(s)	Ref.
Various	August 28, 2026	Alamo	CD; LP; Digital download; streaming	Standard	

== See also ==
- 2026 in hip hop music
- List of Billboard 200 number-one albums of 2026
