= What's Missing =

Single by Alexander O'Neal

from the album Alexander O'Neal
- Released: 1986
- Recorded: 1984
- Genre: R&B
- Length: 5:43 (album version)
- Label: Tabu
- Songwriter: Jimmy Jam and Terry Lewis
- Producer: Jimmy Jam and Terry Lewis

Alexander O'Neal singles chronology
"Saturday Love" (1985)	"What's Missing" (1986)	"You Were Meant to Be My Lady (Not My Girl)" (1986)

What's Missing is a song written by Jimmy Jam and Terry Lewis and recorded by American recording artist Alexander O'Neal. It is the fourth single from the singer's self-titled debut studio album, Alexander O'Neal (1985). Following the moderately successful chart performances of the Alexander O'Neal singles "Innocent", "If You Were Here Tonight", and "A Broken Heart Can Mend", "What's Missing" was released as the album's fourth single.

== Release ==
Alexander O'Neal's 5th hit single and it reached #90 in the UK singles chart. In the United States, the single reached #8 on Billboard's Hot R&B/Hip-Hop Singles & Tracks.

== Track listing and formats ==
- US 7" Vinyl single

A "What's Missing" – 4:06
B "Are You The One?" – 3:41

- US 12" Vinyl single

A "What's Missing (Remix)" – 8:28
B "What's Missing (Instrumental)" – 8:28

- UK 7" Vinyl single

A "What's Missing" – 4:06
B "Do You Wanna Like I Do" – 4:48

- Europe 12" Vinyl single

A "What's Missing (Extended Remix)" – 8:28
B1 "What's Missing (Instrumental)" – 8:28
B2 "Do You Wanna Like I Do" – 4:48

Tracks "Are You the One?" and "Do You Wanna Like I Do" - Producer – Monte Moir

== Charts ==
Chart (1986)	Peak position
US Hot R&B/Hip-Hop Songs (Billboard)	8
US Hot Dance Club Songs (Billboard)	40
UK Singles (Official Charts)	90
