= Hustle (Rod Wave song) =

2026 single by Rod Wave

Single by Rod Wave

from the album Don't Look Down
- Released: July 31, 2026
- Length: 2:19
- Label: Alamo; Sony Music
- Songwriters: Rodarius Green; Thomas Horton; David McDowell; Cameron Holmes
- Producers: TnTXD; DMac; Camm

Rod Wave singles chronology
"Piece of Your Love" (2026)	"Hustle" (2026)

Music video
- "Hustle" on YouTube

"Hustle" is a song by American rapper Rod Wave, released on July 31, 2026 as the second single from his upcoming seventh studio album Don't Look Down (2026). It was produced by TnTXD, DMac and Camm.

== Composition ==
The song features trap production, with a "grittier" sound compared to Rod Wave's usual style. Lyrically, he underscores that he is capable of getting things done when necessary. Wave discusses surviving in the streets, mentions having a quick temper and pays homage to the friends who have always supported him. Towards the end, he performs in his signature soulful singing.

== Critical reception ==
Quincy of Ratings Game Music praised the track while noting its lack of mainstream commercial appeal, which he regarded, as a unique quality of Rod Wave and characteristic of his "unconventional rollout" and independent timing.

== Charts ==
Chart performance
Chart (2026)	Peak position
New Zealand Hot Singles (RMNZ)	22
US Billboard Hot 100	48
US Hot R&B/Hip-Hop Songs (Billboard)	13
