= Alexander O'Neal (album) =

Studio album by Alexander O'Neal
- Released: March 8, 1985
- Recorded: February 1984 – January 1985
- Studios: Creation Audio (Minneapolis); Larrabee Sound (Los Angeles)
- Genres: R&B; soul
- Length: 42:39
- Labels: Tabu; Epic
- Producers: Jimmy Jam; Terry Lewis; Monte Moir

Alexander O'Neal chronology
Alexander O'Neal (1985)	Hearsay (1987)

Singles from Alexander O'Neal
- 1. "Innocent" Released: January 8, 1985; 2. "A Broken Heart Can Mend" Released: May 1985; 3. "If You Were Here Tonight" Released: June 4, 1985; 4. "What's Missing" Released: March 4, 1986; 5. "You Were Meant to Be My Lady (Not My Girl)" Released: July 1, 1986

Alexander O'Neal is the debut solo studio album by American singer Alexander O'Neal, released on March 8, 1985, by Tabu and Epic Records. The songs were recorded between February 1984 and January 1985 in sessions that took place at Creation Audio in Minneapolis and at Larrabee Sound in Los Angeles, assisted by R&B songwriting and record production team Jimmy Jam and Terry Lewis.

== Critical reception ==
Professional ratings
Review scores
Source	Rating
AllMusic	4.5/5 stars
Robert Christgau	B
The Rolling Stone Album Guide	3/5 stars

Alexander O'Neal was well received by most critics. In his consumer guide for The Village Voice, Robert Christgau gave the album a "B" rating. He commented that "from the Timexes who gave the world the new improved S.O.S. Band, a new improved black matinee idol. They start one side with a can't-miss post-vulnerable ballad, the other with a can't-miss dance song deceptively entitled "Innocent". He then added: "The rest they leave to craft. Is this any way to serve a new improved matinee idol? Probably." Alex Henderson of AllMusic gave the album four and a half out of five stars and wrote that "creatively and commercially, the soul man hit the ground running with this impressive debut album", adding that "excellent from start to finish, Alexander O'Neal is the singer's most essential album."

== Commercial performance ==
One of O'Neal's most commercially successful solo albums, in the United States Alexander O'Neal went on to peak at number 92 on the US Billboard 200 and number 21 on Top R&B/Hip-Hop Albums chart. In the UK, the album sold more than 100,000 copies and was certified gold by the BPI. The album launched four charting singles in the United Kingdom. "If You Were Here Tonight" peaked at number 13 on the UK Singles Chart; "A Broken Heart Can Mend" peaked at number 53; "What's Missing" at number 90; "You Were Meant to Be My Lady (Not My Girl)" at number 98.

== Reissue ==
The album was re-released on 8 April 2013 on Tabu's new Re-born imprint featuring rare bonus content. The reissue is a 2-CD set with the original album digitally remastered from the original 1/2" mix tapes; the bonus content consists of associated 7", and 12" mixes.

== Track listing ==
All songs written and composed by James Harris and Terry Lewis, except where noted.

Side one
No.	Title	Writer(s)	Length
1.	"A Broken Heart Can Mend"		3:45
2.	"If You Were Here Tonight"	Monte Moir	6:11
3.	"Do You Wanna Like I Do"	Moir	4:50
4.	"Look at Us Now"	Moir	5:07

Side two
No.	Title	Length
1.	"Medley ("Innocent"/"Alex 9000"/"Innocent II")"	10:32
2.	"What's Missing"	5:43
3.	"You Were Meant to Be My Lady (Not My Girl)"	6:31

== Personnel ==
Credits are adapted from the album's liner notes.

- Alexander O'Neal – lead vocals, backing vocals
- Jimmy Jam – synthesizer, synthesizer programming, acoustic piano, drum programming, percussion, backing vocals,
- Terry Lewis – bass guitar, guitar, percussion, drum programming, synthesizers, backing vocals
- Monte Moir – synthesizer, synthesizer programming, acoustic piano, drum programming, percussion, backing vocals
- Jellybean Johnson – drums, percussion, guitar solo

Additional personnel

- David Eiland – saxophone
- O'Nicholas Raths – guitar
- John Della Selva – guitar
- Bobby Schnitzer – guitar
- Thomas Organ – guitar
- Marcus Wise – tablas, bion
- Cherrelle – backing vocals
- Lucia Newell – backing vocals
- Gwendolyn Traylor – backing vocals
- Denise Saenz – backing vocals

Technical

- Jack Daly – recording engineer
- Brian Gardner – mastering
- Steve Hodge – mixing
- Fred Howard – mixing, recording engineer
- Randy Tominaga – recording engineers
- Steve Wiese – recording engineers

== Charts ==
Chart performance for Alexander O'Neal
Chart (1985–86)	Peak position
Dutch Albums (Album Top 100)	72
UK Albums (Official Charts)	19
US Billboard 200	92
US Top R&B/Hip-Hop Albums (Billboard)	21

== Sales and certifications ==
Certifications for Alexander O'Neal
Region	Certification	Certified units/sales
United Kingdom (BPI)	Gold	100,000^{^}
^{^} Shipments figures based on certification alone.

== Release history ==
Alexander O'Neal release history
Region	Date	Format(s)	Label	Catalog number
United States	1985	CAS; CD; LP	Tabu	FZ 39331
United Kingdom	1985	CAS; CD; LP	Tabu	TBU 26485
Europe	2002	CD	Tabu; The Right Stuff	72435-42424-2-7, CDVUS 230
Japan	July 24, 2013	CD	Solid	CDSOL-5201
United Kingdom	April 8, 2013	CD	Tabu	TABU2001
