= A Broken Heart Can Mend =

Single by Alexander O'Neal

from the album Alexander O'Neal
- Released: 1985
- Recorded: 1984
- Genre: R&B; slow jam
- Length: 3:45 (album version)
- Label: Tabu
- Songwriter: Jimmy Jam and Terry Lewis
- Producers: Jimmy Jam; Terry Lewis

Alexander O'Neal singles chronology
"If You Were Here Tonight" (1985)	"A Broken Heart Can Mend" (1985)	"Saturday Love" (1985)

Music video
- "A Broken Heart Can Mend" on YouTube

"A Broken Heart Can Mend" is a song written by Jimmy Jam and Terry Lewis and recorded by American recording artist Alexander O'Neal. It is the third single from O'Neal's self-titled debut studio album, Alexander O'Neal (1985). Following the moderately successful chart performances of the Alexander O'Neal singles "Innocent", and "If You Were Here Tonight", "A Broken Heart Can Mend" was released as the album's third single.

== Release ==
Alexander O'Neal's third hit single reached No. 53 in the UK Singles Chart and No. 62 on the Billboard Hot R&B Singles chart in the US.

== Track listing and formats ==
- US 7" Vinyl single (ZS4 05646)

A "A Broken Heart Can Mend" – 3:23
B "Do You Wanna Like I Do" – 4:48

- UK 12" Vinyl single (TA 6244)

A "A Broken Heart Can Mend" – 3:40
B1 "Innocent" – 10:34
B2 "Are You the One" – 3:41

- Europe 12" Vinyl single (QTA 6244)

A1 "A Broken Heart Can Mend" – 3:40
A2 "What's Missing (Extended Remix)" – 8:28
B1 "What's Missing (Instrumental)" – 8:28
B2 "Are You the One" – 3:41

== Charts ==
Chart (1985–1986)	Peak position
US Hot R&B/Hip-Hop Songs (Billboard)	62
UK Singles (Official Charts)	53
