= Feed the Streets =

2026 single by Rod Wave

Single by Rod Wave

from the album Don't Look Down
- Released: January 30, 2026
- Length: 2:58
- Label: Alamo; Sony Music
- Songwriters: Rodarius Green; Matvey Lokotetskiy; Matthew Taylor; Mick Steinbach; Chidi Osondu
- Producers: Klutchfrenchie; Travis Harrington; Chi Chi

Rod Wave singles chronology
"Leavin" (2025)	"Feed the Streets" (2026)	"Piece of Your Love" (2026)

Music video
- "Feed the Streets" on YouTube

"Feed the Streets" is a song by American rapper Rod Wave. It was released on December 25, 2025 as a music video, before being released to streaming services on January 30, 2026. It was produced by Klutchfrenchie, Travis Harrington, and Chi Chi.

== Composition ==
The song contains piano-driven production and soft instrumentation, over which Rod Wave raps melodically about topics such as loyalty, pressure and the burden of responsibility. It opens with him sing-rapping about the impact of his uncle's death, comparing it to rapper Key Glock losing his cousin Young Dolph. Wave also name-drops many powerful and influential figures, including Malcolm X, 2Pac, Suge Knight, Puff Daddy, Mike Tyson and Jay-Z.

== Critical reception ==
Alexander Cole of HotNewHipHop wrote that the song "follows the ideal Rod Wave formula. Solid rapping, melodic flows, soulful singing, and some gorgeous production that complements the melodies. Wave has not lost his step, and we cannot wait to hear what he produces in 2026." Tallie Spencer of HotNewHipHop remarked, "His signature pain-filled vocals carry the track, making it feel less like a performance and more like a conversation. 'Feed the Streets' reflects Rod's ability to turn struggle into connection, speaking directly to fans who see themselves in his honesty. The song reinforces why Rod Wave remains one of hip-hop's most emotionally impactful voices, delivering sincerity without chasing trends."

== Music video ==
The music video was directed by Cam Grey. It features footage of Rod Wave boarding jets and appearing backstage.

== Charts ==
Chart performance for "Feed the Streets"
Chart (2026)	Peak position
US Billboard Hot 100	86
US Hot R&B/Hip-Hop Songs (Billboard)	33
