= Aimee Carty =

Irish singer-songwriter

- Born: Ballygar, County Galway, Ireland
- Genres: Folk, pop.
- Occupation: Singer-songwriter
- Instruments: Vocals, piano
- Years active: 2023–present
- Website: Aimee Carty on YouTube

Aimee Carty is an Irish singer-songwriter. She came to attention in 2024 with a self-penned song on TikTok "2 Days into College" that went viral after it was picked up by American basketball player Jared McCain. The song received over 45 million streams on social media, and entered the official UK and Irish singles charts in February 2024.

== Biography ==
Carty grew up in Ballygar, County Galway, Ireland and went to secondary school at Coláiste Mhuire, Ballygar. She went to University College, Dublin, and it was here that she released her viral song, "2 Days into College".

== Music career ==
Carty began releasing singles in 2023. In February 2023 she released her first single, "One Day You Will Fly Too", which she entered in Galway Bay FM's "A New Local Hero" competition. She released "Painter" shortly after. Both songs revolved around themes of encouragement and included storytelling elements.

In December 2023 Carty released "2 Days into College". This song captures the tribulations of starting university, and adjusting to the independence and pace of life.

Carty shared her single on TikTok, where it was picked up by Duke University basketball player, Jared McCain, in late January. McCain released a clip of Carty's song with him singing a cappella. This rapidly went viral, with millions of views, edits and remixes of both Carty's original TikTok and McCain's cover. The song was streamed so many times that it entered the singles charts in the UK and Ireland in February 2024. It peaked at 23 and spent 3 weeks on the Irish singles chart, and 5 weeks on the UK independent singles chart. Carty released two further singles in 2024, "Memories" (September) and "Baker" (July), and announced concert dates for gigs in London and Dublin in November 2024. “Sister” was also released in December 2024. “Baker” and “Sister” both focused on Carty's childhood, while “Memories” discussed her grandparents' past and the bittersweet feeling the passage of time leaves us. However, Aimee's storytelling went even further in 2025. In March, she released “Never met at all”, which explores the chances of two people meeting exactly at the correct time. Then just a week later, “Child Again” was released. This song persuades listeners to look at life from the perspective of a child. Finally, in June, Carty gave her audience another song, “Our Flame”, which is a deep reflective ballad about the toxicity and struggle of letting a relationship go, differing from her usual positive outlook in her songs.

== Discography ==
=== Extended plays ===
| Title | EP details |
|---|---|
| Child Again | Released: 28 March 2025; Label: AWAL; Format: Digital download, streaming |

=== Singles ===
| Title | Year | Peak chart positions | | | Album |
| Title | Year | IRE | UK | US Bub. | Album |
|---|---|---|---|---|---|
| "One Day You Will Fly Too" | 2023 | — | — | — | Non-album singles |
| "Painter" | 2023 | — | — | — | Non-album singles |
| "2 Days into College" | 2023 | 23 | 84 | 5 | Non-album singles |
| "Baker" | 2024 | — | — | — | Child Again |
| "Memories" | 2024 | — | — | — | Child Again |
| "Sister" | 2025 | — | — | — | Child Again |
| "Never Met at All" | 2025 | — | — | — | Child Again |
| "Child Again" | 2025 | — | — | — | Child Again |
| "Our Flame" | 2025 | — | — | — | Non-album singles |
| "All in a Lifetime" | 2025 | — | — | — | Non-album singles |
| "Younger Me" | 2025 | — | — | — | Non-album singles |

=== Other charted songs ===
| Title | Year | Peak chart positions | | | Album |
| Title | Year | NZ Hot | US | US HH/R&B | Album |
|---|---|---|---|---|---|
| "2017 (Streamer U)" (Rod Wave featuring Aimee Carty) | 2026 | 34 | 90 | 29 | Don't Look Down |
