= Leavin (Rod Wave song) =

2025 single by Rod Wave

Single by Rod Wave
- Released: October 13, 2025
- Length: 2:48
- Label: Alamo; Sony Music
- Songwriters: Rodarius Green; Thomas Horton; Justin Bradbury; Antonio Ramos; Oliver Capstick; Rocksen Jean-Luis
- Producers: TnTXD; JB; TrillGotJuice; O Soma; Sensei Rocky

Rod Wave singles chronology
"Sinners" (2025)	"Leavin" (2025)	"Feed the Streets" (2026)

Music video
- "Leavin" on YouTube

"Leavin" is a single by American rapper Rod Wave, released on October 13, 2025. It was produced by TnTXD, JB, TrillGotJuice, O Soma and Sensei Rocky. The song contains a sample of "The Way You See Me" by singer Sophia Alexa.

== Content ==
In the song, Rod Wave performs only one long verse and centers on his hard life, especially concerning the aspect of being unable to trust anyone. He begins by lamenting the lack of loyalty in society, before noting that he is mistrustful of friends and lovers and takes drugs to cope with his feelings. Toward the end of the verse, Wave emphasizes the idea that money and success cannot always buy happiness.

== Critical reception ==
Gabriel Bras Nevares of HotNewHipHop gave a positive review, writing "It's a passionate cut with a pretty interesting drum pattern that provides a lot of swing in comparison to more static material. The Florida star comes off very animated and empowered on this cut, reaching higher highs with his dynamic vocal delivery. We'll see whether or not this ends up being the main sound on his upcoming record. If so, we could be in for one of this catalog's most compelling releases yet."

== Music video ==
The music video premiered alongside the single. It sees Rod Wave in a mansion with armed guards and wearing jewelry.

== Charts ==
Chart performance for "Leavin"
Chart (2025)	Peak position
US Billboard Hot 100	63
US Hot R&B/Hip-Hop Songs (Billboard)	12
