= Jared McCain =

American basketball player (born 2004)

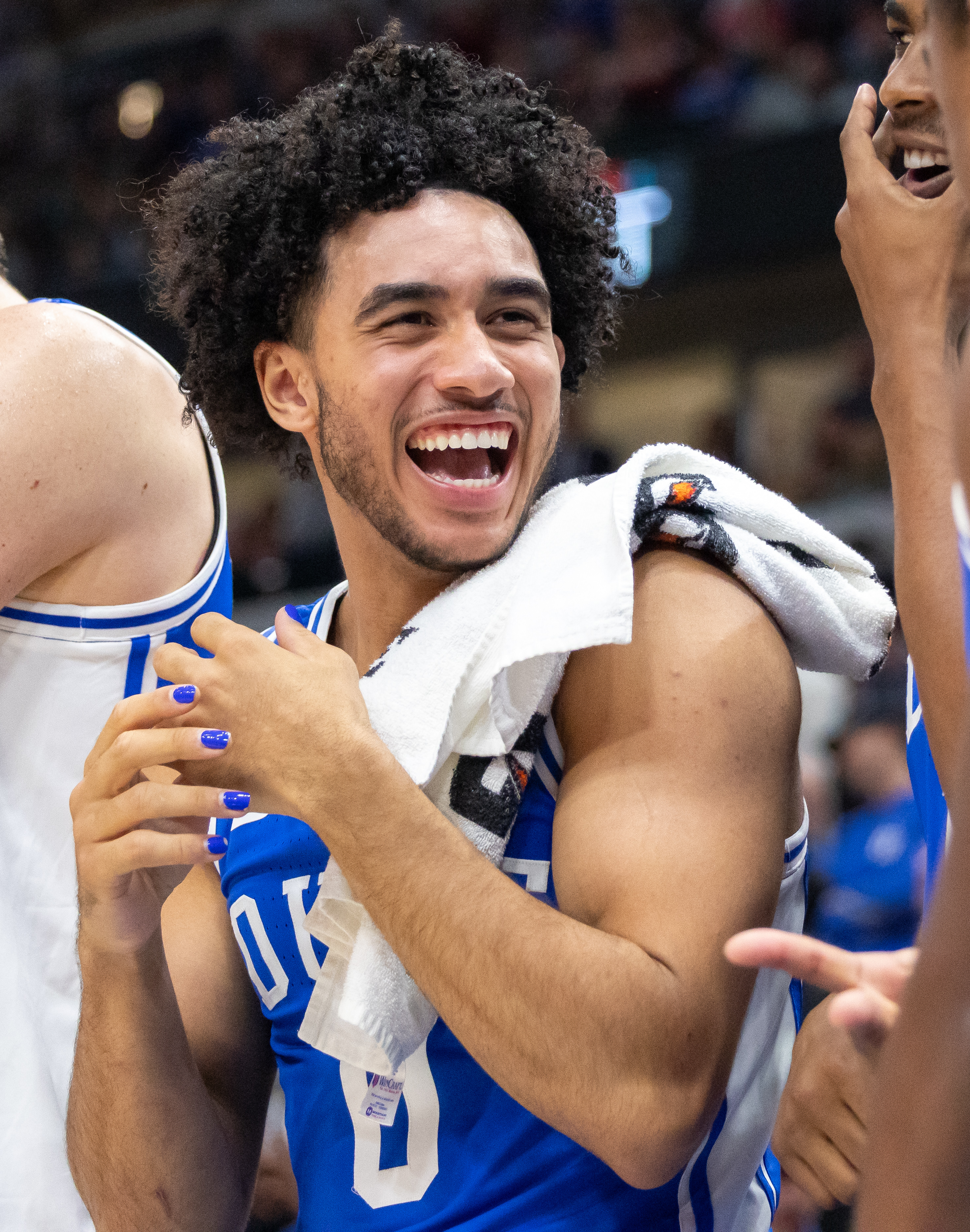
- McCain with Duke in 2023

No. 3 – Oklahoma City Thunder
- Position: Shooting guard
- League: NBA

Personal information
- Born: February 20, 2004 (age 22) Sacramento, California, U.S.
- Listed height: 6 ft 2 in (1.88 m)
- Listed weight: 195 lb (88 kg)

Career information
- High school: Centennial (Corona, California)
- College: Duke (2023–2024)
- NBA draft: 2024: 1st round, 16th overall pick
- Drafted by: Philadelphia 76ers
- Playing career: 2024–present

Career history
- 2024–2026: Philadelphia 76ers
- 2025: →Delaware Blue Coats
- 2026–present: Oklahoma City Thunder

Career highlights
- ACC All-Rookie team (2024); McDonald's All-American (2023); California Mr. Basketball (2023)
- Stats at NBA.com
- Stats at Basketball Reference
Medals
Men's basketball
Representing United States
FIBA Americas Under-18 Championship
Gold medal – first place	2022 Mexico	Team

Jared Dane McCain (born February 20, 2004) is an American professional basketball player for the Oklahoma City Thunder of the National Basketball Association (NBA). He was a consensus five-star recruit and ranked among the top players in the 2023 class. McCain played college basketball for the Duke Blue Devils before being selected by the Philadelphia 76ers as the 16th overall pick in the first round of the 2024 NBA draft.

== High school career ==
McCain attended Centennial High School in Corona, California, graduating in 2023. As a junior, he was named the 2021–22 Gatorade Player of the Year for boys basketball in California after averaging 16.9 points, 4.7 rebounds, and 4.0 assists per game. During this time, McCain appeared in three seasons of the YouTube docuseries Believe, directed and filmed by Nick Ramos. In his senior year, he was selected to play in the 2023 McDonald's All-American Boys Game. McCain repeated as the 2022–23 Gatorade Player of the Year for boys basketball in California after averaging 17.7 points, 7.1 rebounds, 4.0 assists, and 1.5 steals per game.

=== Recruiting ===
McCain was a consensus five-star recruit and ranked among the top players in the 2023 class according to major recruiting services. He verbally committed to play college basketball for the Duke Blue Devils on March 18, 2022, and signed his national letter of intent on November 9. McCain chose Duke over offers from Gonzaga, Houston, Kansas, and Louisville.

College recruiting
Name	Hometown	School	Height	Weight	Commit date
Jared McCain; SG	Sacramento, CA	Centennial (CA)	6 ft 4 in (1.93 m)	195 lb (88 kg)	Mar 18, 2022
Jared McCain; SG	Recruit ratings: Rivals: 247Sports: ESPN: (92)				
Overall recruit ranking: Rivals: 12 247Sports: 14 ESPN: 10
Note: In many cases, Scout, Rivals, 247Sports, On3, and ESPN may conflict in their listings of height and weight.; In these cases, the average was taken. ESPN grades are on a 100-point scale.; Sources: "Duke 2023 Basketball Commitments". Rivals.; "2023 Duke Blue Devils Recruiting Class". ESPN.; "2023 Team Ranking". Rivals.

== College career ==
McCain enrolled at Duke University in June 2023. He made his college basketball debut on November 6, 2023, scoring 8 points in 15 minutes in a 92–54 win over Dartmouth. On January 27, 2024, McCain scored 21 points and grabbed 5 rebounds during a 72–71 victory against Clemson. He was named the Atlantic Coast Conference (ACC) Rookie of the Week on January 29. McCain recorded a career-high 35 points on February 17, tying the Duke freshman record previously held by Zion Williamson, in a 76–67 win against Florida State. For this performance, he received ACC Rookie of the Week honors again on February 19. On March 24, he contributed 30 points and 5 rebounds in a 93–55 victory over James Madison. In the Elite Eight round of the 2024 NCAA tournament on March 31, McCain scored 32 points in a 76–64 loss to NC State. He concluded his freshman season averaging 14.3 points and 5.0 rebounds per game.

After the conclusion of the 2023–24 season, McCain declared for the 2024 NBA draft on April 12, 2024, forgoing his remaining college eligibility. He later received an invitation to the draft green room.

== Professional career ==
=== Philadelphia 76ers (2024–2026) ===
McCain was selected by the Philadelphia 76ers as the 16th overall pick in the first round of the 2024 NBA draft. He signed a four-year contract with the team on July 4, 2024.

McCain made his National Basketball Association (NBA) debut on October 23, 2024, in a 124–109 loss to the Milwaukee Bucks. On November 13, he recorded a career-high 34 points and 10 assists in a 114–106 loss to the Cleveland Cavaliers. He was named the Eastern Conference Rookie of the Month for October and November after leading all NBA rookies with 16.0 points per game over 18 appearances, becoming the first 76ers player to receive the honor since Ben Simmons in March 2018. On December 14, it was announced that McCain had suffered a meniscus tear in his left knee, sidelining him indefinitely. On January 10, 2025, it was officially reported that he would miss the remainder of the season.

On October 1, 2025, the 76ers announced that McCain had undergone surgery to repair a tear in the ulnar collateral ligament (UCL) of his right thumb. As a result, he was expected to miss at least one month of play. McCain made 37 appearances (including one start) for Philadelphia during the 2025–26 NBA season, averaging 6.6 points, 2.0 rebounds, and 1.7 assists.

=== Oklahoma City Thunder (2026–present) ===
On February 4, 2026, McCain was traded to the Oklahoma City Thunder in exchange for a 2026 first-round pick and three second-round picks. On February 7, McCain made his Thunder debut, putting up five points in a 112–106 loss to the Houston Rockets. On May 22, McCain had a playoff career-high 24 points in a 123–108 victory over the San Antonio Spurs in game 3 of the 2026 Western Conference Finals.

== National team career ==
McCain represented the United States at the 2022 FIBA U18 Americas Championship held in Tijuana, Mexico. He played in all six games during the tournament and contributed to the team’s undefeated 6–0 record, which earned them the gold medal. Throughout the competition, he averaged 11.2 points, 3.0 rebounds, and 2.2 assists per game, while shooting 41.5 percent from the field.

== Career statistics ==
Legend
GP	Games played	GS	Games started	MPG	Minutes per game
FG%	Field goal percentage	3P%	3-point field goal percentage	FT%	Free throw percentage
RPG	Rebounds per game	APG	Assists per game	SPG	Steals per game
BPG	Blocks per game	PPG	Points per game	**Bold**	Career high

=== NBA ===
==== Regular season ====
Year	Team	GP	GS	MPG	FG%	3P%	FT%	RPG	APG	SPG	BPG	PPG
2024–25	Philadelphia	23	**8**	**25.7**	.460	.383	.875	**2.4**	**2.6**	**.7**	.0	**15.3**
2025–26	Philadelphia	**37**	1	16.8	.385	.378	**.880**	2.0	1.7	.6	**.1**	6.6
2025–26	Oklahoma City	30	2	18.0	**.462**	**.391**	.853	2.1	.9	.4	**.1**	10.4
Career		90	11	19.5	.438	.385	.870	2.1	1.7	.6	.1	10.1

==== Playoffs ====
Year	Team	GP	GS	MPG	FG%	3P%	FT%	RPG	APG	SPG	BPG	PPG
2026	Oklahoma City	15	2	17.2	.412	.371	.800	1.9	1.0	.3	.0	10.0
Career		15	2	17.2	.412	.371	.800	1.9	1.0	.3	.0	10.0

=== College ===
Year	Team	GP	GS	MPG	FG%	3P%	FT%	RPG	APG	SPG	BPG	PPG
2023–24	Duke	36	36	31.6	.462	.414	.885	5.0	1.9	1.1	.1	14.3

== Media and endorsements ==
McCain gained recognition on social media platforms, particularly TikTok and YouTube, by posting basketball-related content, personal vlogs, and participating in trending dance challenges. Notably, in January 2024, McCain posted a video to the song 2 Days into College by Aimee Carty, which proceeded to go viral. His activity on these platforms throughout his years at Duke University and joining the Philadelphia 76ers contributed to his growth as an influencer.

== Personal life ==
McCain is of mixed racial heritage. His mother, Jina, is an American with both White and Filipino ancestry. His father, Lance, is African American.

McCain has one sibling, an older brother named Jayce. Jayce played college basketball for the Cal State San Marcos Cougars and, as of October 2025, is serving as the Player Development Specialist for the Duke Blue Devils.
