= Work (Rihanna song) =

2016 single by Rihanna featuring Drake

Single by Rihanna featuring Drake

from the album Anti
- Language: Bajan Creole; Jamaican Patois; English
- Released: January 27, 2016
- Recorded: 2015
- Studio: Westlake and Sandra Gale (Los Angeles); S.O.T.A. (Toronto)
- Genre: Dancehall; reggae-pop; R&B
- Length: 3:39
- Label: Roc Nation; Westbury Road
- Songwriters: Jahron Brathwaite; Matthew Samuels; Allen Ritter; Rupert Thomas Jr.; Aubrey Graham; Robyn Fenty; Monte Moir
- Producer: Boi-1da

Rihanna singles chronology
"American Oxygen" (2015)	"Work" (2016)	"Famous" (2016)

Drake singles chronology
"Jumpman" (2015)	"Work" (2016)	"Summer Sixteen" (2016)

Music video
- "Work" on YouTube

"Work" is a song by Barbadian singer Rihanna featuring Canadian rapper Drake from her eighth studio album, Anti (2016). It was released on January 27, 2016, through Westbury Road and Roc Nation, as the lead single from the album. Incorporating elements of dancehall, reggae, pop, and R&B, "Work" contains an interpolation of Alexander O'Neal's "If You Were Here Tonight" (1985). Written in the English-based creole languages of Jamaica and Barbados, its lyrics describe fragile relationships and yearning for intimacy. The song was written by Rihanna, Drake, Jahron Brathwaite, Monte Moir, Rupert Thomas, Allen Ritter, and Matthew "Boi-1da" Samuels—the last of which produced the track—while Kuk Harrell and Noah "40" Shebib were additional producers.

Upon release, "Work" was received with mixed reviews; critics who praised the song highlighted Rihanna's return to the dancehall sound of her early career and embrace of Caribbean culture, while less positive reviews labeled its production as repetitive and the lyrics as insubstantial. The song was nominated for Record of the Year and Best Pop Duo/Group Performance at the 59th Grammy Awards, and publications such as NME and Pitchfork ranked it among the best songs of the 2010s.

Director X and Tim Erem directed two separate music videos for "Work", which were released on February 22, 2016. The first depicts Rihanna and Drake dancing in a club, and the second depicts them in a room. Rihanna performed the song live at the Brit Awards and the MTV Video Music Awards (both 2016), as well as on the Anti World Tour. The single spent nine weeks atop the US Billboard Hot 100. It peaked at number one in Canada, Denmark, France, the Netherlands, Portugal, Slovakia, and South Africa. It also received numerous multi-platinum certifications, including a diamond certification in France and the United States, as well as nine-times platinum certification in Canada. It was the fourth-bestselling song of 2016 in the US. "Work" sold 32.5 million units worldwide by January 2021.

== Background and production ==
Following the release of Rihanna's seventh studio album, Unapologetic (2012), and its accompanying tour, Rihanna took a step back from music. Between 2005 and 2012, she had released one studio album each year. However, no album was released between 2013 and 2015. She reportedly started recording new music as soon as October 2014. She officially broke her hiatus with Anti, an album she conceived as "soulful" and "timeless", having found the songs on her past albums had fallen out of her taste.

"Work" was written by PartyNextDoor, Drake, Rihanna, Monte Moir, Rupert "Sevn" Thomas, Allen Ritter and Matthew Samuels, and was produced by Boi-1da, Sevn Thomas, Ritter, Kuk Harrell and Noah "40" Shebib. In mid-2015, Thomas, Ritter, Boi-1da, and Martin Mason, among others, stayed at Drake's house in Los Angeles for a mid-week period. Thomas described the time spent at the home as a "beat factory, everyone was sitting there working and collaborating with each other". Thomas created a beat which was dancehall-influenced; he later played it for Boi-1da to which he positively responded. Boi-1da came up with an idea for sampling an "old school dancehall rhythm", and after that the chords were made with Ritter; after that, "everything went organically". The most recognizable sampling found in the "Work" riddim is from the 1998 riddim "Sail Away", produced by Richie Stephens and Mikey 2000, interpolating Alexander O'Neal's "If You Were Here Tonight" (1985).

When the song's music was finished, Boi-1da sent it to PartyNextDoor, who wrote the lyrics. PartyNextDoor originally wrote the record as a breakup song; after Drake heard the song and enjoyed it, he decided to write and record a verse. The original reference track contained Braithwaite's vocals and a tweaked verse from Drake. It leaked as a snippet in February 2016, and the full version was released online in April of that year. Initially, the intention was to keep the song as a collaboration between the two, or to give to Alicia Keys. Shortly thereafter, Braithwaite stayed at Rihanna's home in Malibu, California, where he played her the song, saying afterwards "it was all that she could sing around the house" and that it was her "family's favourite song".

Rihanna's vocals were recorded by Marcos Tovar and Kuk Harrell at Westlake Recording Studios, Los Angeles; Harrell also served as a vocal producer. Drake's vocals were recorded by Noel Cadastre and Noah "40" Shebib at the Sandra Gale Studios in California and the SOTA Studios in Toronto. The vocal recording was assisted by Thomas Warren, while additional vocals were provided by PartyNextDoor. Manny Marroquin mixed "Work" at the Larrabee Studios, while Noel "Gadget" Campbell and Shebib did the mixing at the Studio 360 and SOTA Studios in Toronto. The mastering was done by Chris Gehringer at the Sterling Sound in New York City. "Work" marked the third collaboration between Rihanna and Drake, following "What's My Name?" (2010) and "Take Care" (2012).

== Music and lyrics ==
At 3 minutes and 39 seconds long, "Work" is a dancehall, reggae-pop and R&B song. Hugh McIntyre of Forbes described the song as urban and mixing hip-hop influences with "island vibes". Zach Frydenlund of Complex described the song as slower and focused on Rihanna's vocal skills. The song is in the C♯ Dorian mode (written using the same key signature as G♯ minor) in common time with a tempo of 92 beats per minute. The vocals in the song span from F♯_{3} to E♭_{5}. Alexa Camp of Slant Magazine called it "an understated midtempo jam in the vein of Janet Jackson's recent 'No Sleeep'". The Guardian's Harriet Gibsone described the song as incorporating elements of dub and dancehall, and featuring AutoTuned vocals.

Rolling Stone's Daniel Kreps wrote the song contains "a tropical house vibe". Conversely, Taj Ran from Billboard thought the song featured more dancehall instead of tropical house. The Atlantic's Spencer Kornhaber felt Boi-1da tried to create "escalation" in the song by adding additional drums for the second chorus, flutes, AutoTuned harmonies and back-off piano. Lyrically, Kornhaber interpreted "Work" as "about working for a paycheck no matter what else is going on in your life". The New York Times' Jon Caramanica described Rihanna as at times "barely even rel[ying] on words, truncating her syllables past patois to something far less exact." Additionally, it focuses on a fragile relationship depicted in the line, "If I get another chance to, I would never, oh never, neglect you", which is sung by Rihanna.

== Release and commercial performance ==
Following the release of three singles in 2015—"FourFiveSeconds" (featuring Kanye West and Paul McCartney), "Bitch Better Have My Money" and "American Oxygen"—Billboard announced that Rihanna was set to premiere a new single on January 27, 2016, at 8 a.m. eastern standard time. The same day, "Work" premiered on several radio stations worldwide, including BBC Radio 1 in the United Kingdom. Subsequently, it was made available for digital download in most countries worldwide via the iTunes Store, and was added for streaming on Apple Music, Spotify, and Tidal.

"Work" debuted at number nine on the US Billboard Hot 100 chart issue dated February 13, 2016. It became the 27th top-10 hit for Rihanna and 15th for Drake. With this feat, Rihanna tied Mariah Carey, Janet Jackson and Elton John as the artists with the fifth-most top-ten songs on the chart. Rihanna earned 27 top-ten singles on the Hot 100 in a span of 10 years and 8 months between her first single, "Pon de Replay" and "Work", and became the fastest solo artist to reach the plateau. It also became her 50th song to chart on the Hot 100. "Work" debuted at number one on the US Billboard Digital Songs chart with over 126,000 downloads sold in only just over a day of tracking. Additionally, "Work" launched at number 27 on the US Billboard Radio Songs chart with 44 million audience impressions, becoming the highest debut of her career.

The following week, "Work" sold an additional 156,000 copies and moved up to number seven on the Hot 100 chart. In its third week, "Work" jumped 7–4 on the Hot 100 chart, earning Rihanna her milestone 20th top-five hit, tying her with Michael Jackson and Stevie Wonder as the artists with the fifth-most top-five songs on the chart. In its fourth week, "Work" reached the summit of the Hot 100 chart and became Rihanna's fourteenth number-one song in the United States. Subsequently, she became the artist with the fourth-most number-one songs on the chart, following the Beatles with 20, Mariah Carey with 19, and Elvis Presley with 18. She broke a tie with Michael Jackson, who had reached 13 chart-toppers on the Billboard Hot 100. Additionally, "Work" became Drake's second number-one single on the chart, the previous being the pair's 2010 collaboration, "What's My Name?". For the same issue, it rose to number 10 on the Radio Songs chart and became her 24th top-ten single, surpassing Mariah Carey's lead of 23 top-tens on that chart. The song remained at number-one on the Hot 100 for nine consecutive weeks and was unseated by Desiigner's "Panda".

The song was most successful on the Billboard Hot R&B/Hip-Hop Songs where it debuted atop the chart, becoming Rihanna's fifth chart-topper and Drake's fourteenth. As of January 2021, "Work" has accumulated over 1.4 billion streams and 1,906,000 downloads in the United States. In France, "Work" peaked at number one on the chart for two weeks, becoming Rihanna's sixth number-one in the country, the second-highest amount of all time, and Drake's first ever. The single also broke the record for the most streams in a single week, with 2.056 million streams. By January 2021, the single had sold an estimated 32.5 million units worldwide.

== Critical reception ==
"Work" received mixed reviews from critics. Joe Lynch of Billboard received the song positively, and thought it was unpredictable and "subvert[ed] expectations". Alexa Camp of Slant Magazine thought it had potential to "at least partly justify the gold crown on the album's cover", and Spin's Brennan Carley thought it was upbeat and fun. Taj Rani of Billboard credited "Work" with bringing the dancehall genre to the "forefront" of American music and praised the song as example of "an unapologetic black woman proudly showing her heritage". BET's Kathy Iandoli called the song "comfortable, but still good".

Other reviews were less positive. Hugh McIntyre of Forbes thought the song was well-produced but was skeptical of whether it was "the pop hit that she needed". The song's repetition was also criticized; Robin Reiff for The A.V. Club thought the song's repetition caused it to have an "expiration date" for when it shifted from catchy to "slightly annoying".

=== Accolades ===
Rolling Stone named "Work" as one of the 30 best songs of the first half of 2016. The Guardian named it "best track of 2016", as well as NME, which named "Work" the best song of 2016 in their year-end critics' poll. NPR and Consequence of Sound both placed the song at 15 on their respective year-end lists. Pitchfork ranked it as the seventh best song of the year. Billboard ranked "Work" at number 25 on their "100 Best Pop Songs of 2016" list. In The Village Voice's "Pazz & Jop" critics' poll for 2016, "Work" was tied at nine with David Bowie's "Blackstar". The song was additionally ranked among 2010s-decade-end lists by NME, Consequence of Sound, Slant Magazine, and Pitchfork. "Work" was nominated for Best Pop Duo/Group Performance and Record of the Year at the 59th Annual Grammy Awards. It won "R&B Song of the Year" and "Best Collaboration" at the 2017 iHeartRadio Music Awards.

== Music video ==
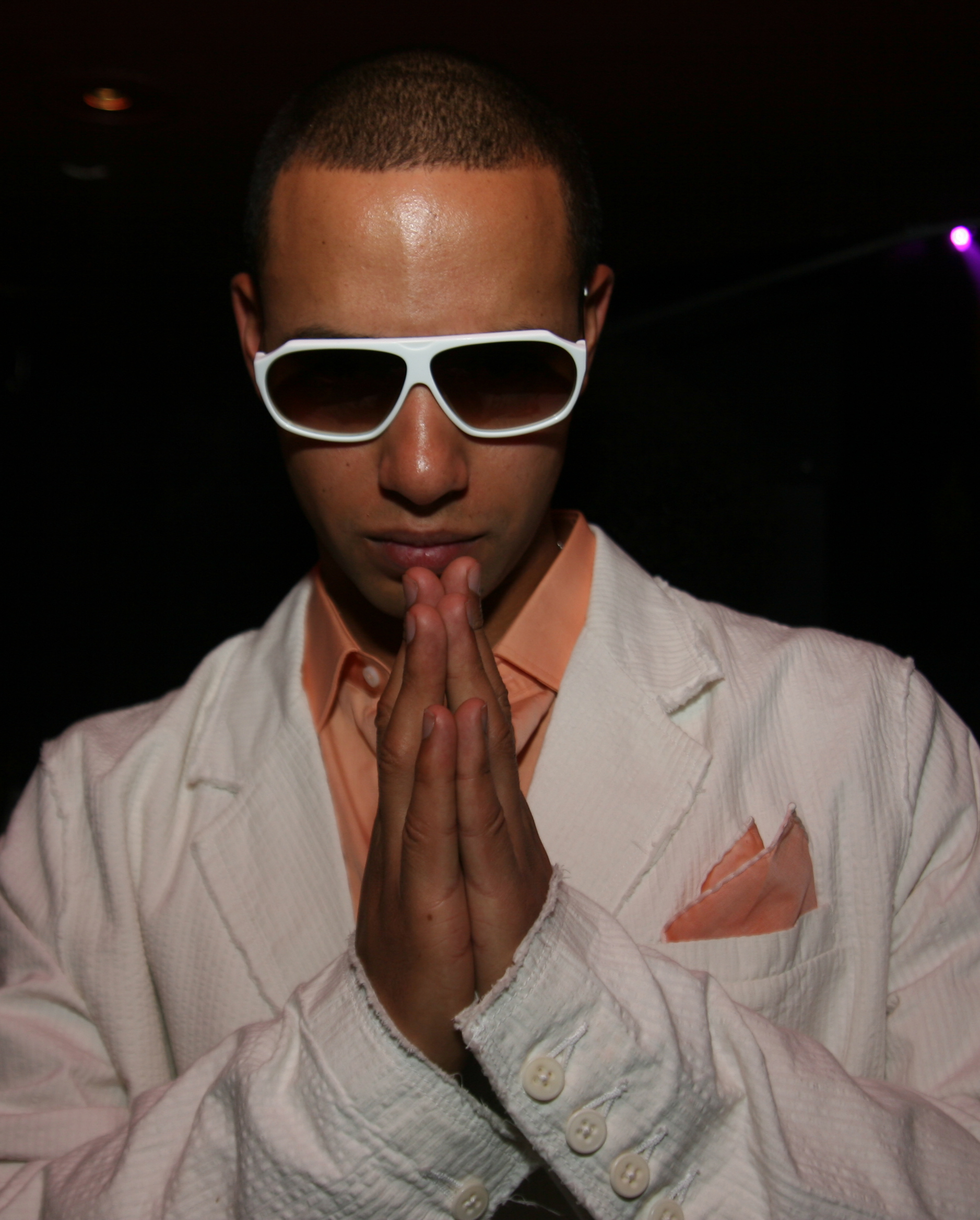
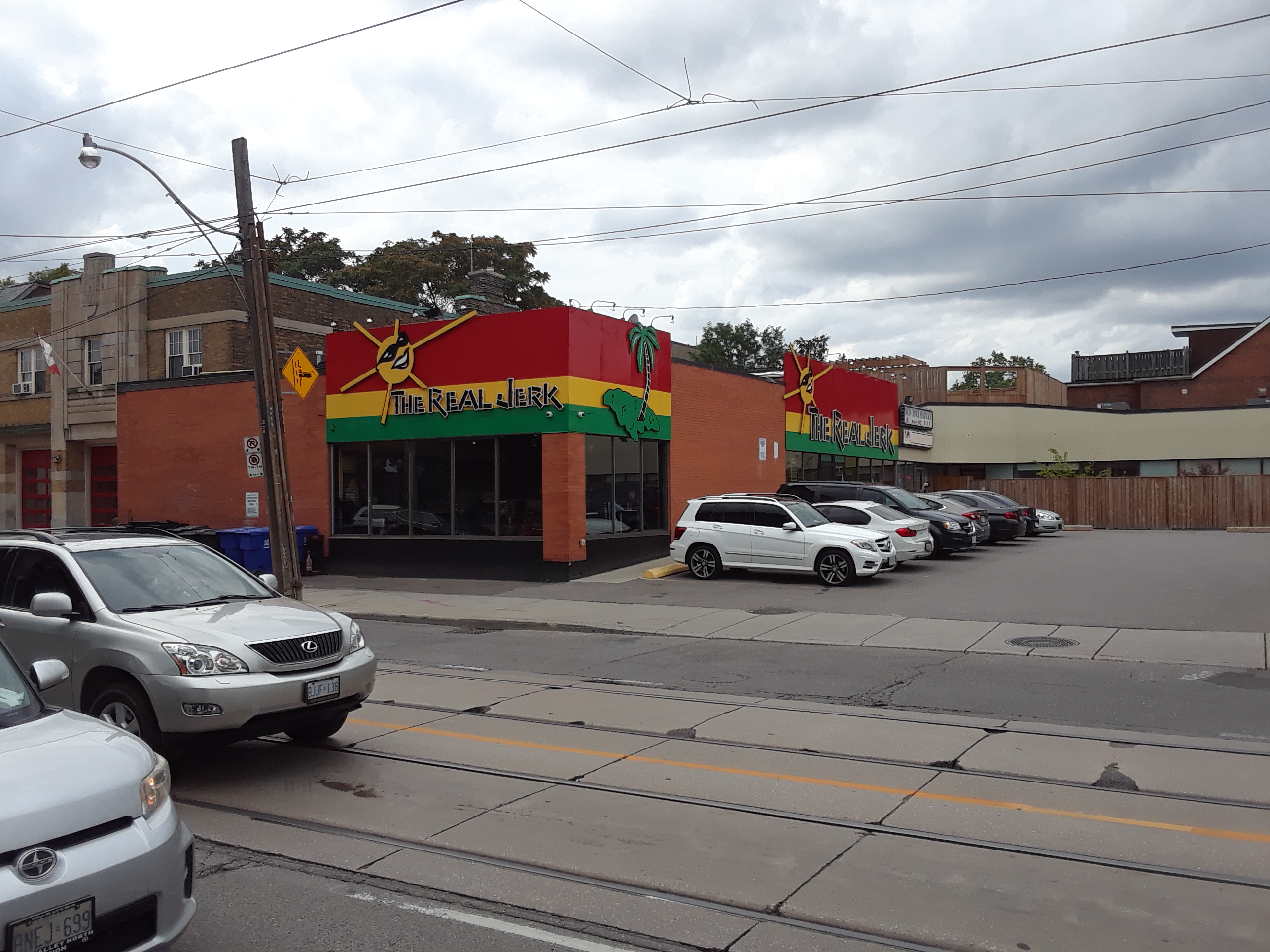
Director X (left) directed the first of the song's two accompanying videos, which was filmed in The Real Jerk restaurant (right).

Two music videos were released for "Work". The first was directed by Director X, who had previously worked with Rihanna on her debut video "Pon de Replay", while the second was directed by Tim Erem. Harv Glazer and Melissa Larsen served as a producer of the visual, while Daniel Bouquet and Alexi Zabes were the director of photography. Laura McMillan and Nick Rondeau were the editors of the video, while Nick Cortes served as the production coordinator. Missy Galanida, Isaac Rice, and Taj Critchlow served as the video's executive producers, while Dave Hussey of Company 3 was the colorist.

Rihanna later announced its premiere date to be February 22, 2016 via her Twitter account, while also releasing a video clip via YouTube. Filming of the first accompanying music video took place at the Real Jerk restaurant in Toronto on February 5. Director X stated that when filming the video they wanted to make it look like they were in a West Indian neighborhood, in a West Indian restaurant. The second video for the single directed by Tim Erem was discussed between the director, Rihanna and Drake in the studio, where they were attempting to come up with ideas to add a tropical vibe to their already existing footage. After 30 minutes they came up with the idea of shooting a video in an entirely pink room.

The first video opens with a shot of "The Real Jerk" carpark, in which Rihanna and Drake enter separately. The shot switches to Rihanna dancing in the nightclub, in front of a mirror. Drake enters the scene in which he raps. The video ends with credits written in a red, green, and yellow typeface. The second video is shot in one piece, as it shows Rihanna and Drake in a room full of neon pink lights and styled with sofas and houseplants aesthetics. Hazel Cills of MTV noted Rihanna's and Drake's chemistry as "playful and confrontational", which was "ultimately made for the viewer's pleasure". Cills continued to state that the second video "luxuriates in our voyeurism". Christopher Hooton from The Independent also picked upon the videos sense of voyeurism and compared the second video to Drake's previous single "Hotline Bling" (2016) and Nicki Minaj's "Anaconda" (2014). Rolling Stone described the videos as being "steamy".

"Work" was nominated for the "Video of the Year" award as the 2016 BET Awards, as well as being nominated for the "Best Female Video" award as the 2016 MTV Video Music Awards. Time listed the video at number eight on their Top 10 Pop Music Videos of 2016, while Pitchfork placed it at 25 on their list of "The Best Music Videos of 2016". As of March 2026, the video has received over 1.4 billion views on YouTube.

== Live performances and other use ==
Rihanna performed "Work" with Drake for the first time at the 2016 Brit Awards on February 24, 2016. It was her first televised promotional appearance for Anti. "Work" was also performed during her Anti World Tour (2016). She performed the song with Drake (along with "Too Good") at OVO Fest Toronto on July 31, 2016. Rihanna also performed "Work" at the 2016 MTV Video Music Awards, as part of a medley with "Rude Boy" and "What's My Name?". The song was performed as part of Rihanna's headlining set at the 2023 Super Bowl Halftime Show.

Rapper ASAP Ferg released his remix of "Work" via SoundCloud on February 9, 2016. On February 17, 2016, Nigerian artist Burna Boy released a remix of "Work", along with a lyric video. American rapper Lil Mama released a remix of the song on March 6, 2016; her version features the same production and chorus, but is accompanied by new rap verses. Lil Mama's version was also released with a video, in which she recreated the original along with newly-choreographed dance moves. Hip-hop duo DJDS released a 1980s-inspired remix via SoundCloud on March 8, 2016.

== Track listing ==
Digital download
No.	Title	Length
1.	"Work" (featuring Drake)	3:39

Remixes
No.	Title	Length
1.	"Work" (R3hab Remix) (featuring Drake)	3:39
2.	"Work" (R3hab Extended Remix) (featuring Drake)	3:59
3.	"Work" (R3hab Extended Instrumental)	3:59
4.	"Work" (BURNS' Late Night Rollin Remix) (featuring Drake)	3:43
5.	"Work" (Bad Royale Remix) (featuring Drake) (Explicit)	3:42
6.	"Work" (Bad Royale Remix) (featuring Drake) (Clean)	3:43
7.	"Work" (Lost Kings Remix) (featuring Drake)	4:19
8.	"Work" (Lost Kings Extended Remix) (featuring Drake)	4:50

== Credits and personnel ==
Credits adapted from Rihanna's official website.

=== Locations ===
- Recorded at Westlake Beverly Recording Studios in Los Angeles, California, Sandra Gale Studios, California and SOTA Studios, Toronto
- Mixed at Studio 306 and SOTA Studios in Toronto, Canada and Larrabee Studios in Universal City, California
- Mastering at Sterling Sound Studios in New York City, New York

=== Personnel ===
- Rihanna – vocals, writing
- Drake – vocals, writing
- Jahron Brathwaite – writing, additional vocals
- Boi-1da – writing, production
- Allen Ritter – writing
- Sevn Thomas – writing
- Monte Moir – writing (interpolation)
- Marcos Tovar – vocal recording
- Kuk Harrell – vocal recording, vocal production
- Thomas Warren – vocal recording
- Noel Cadastre – vocal recording
- Noel "Gadget" Campbell – mixing
- Noah "40" Shebib – vocal production, vocal recording, mixing
- Manny Marroquin – mixing
- Chris Gehringer – mastering

== Charts ==
=== Weekly charts ===
Chart (2016–2017)	Peak position
Australia (ARIA)	5
Austria (Ö3 Austria Top 40)	14
Belgium (Ultratop 50 Flanders)	6
Belgium R&B/Hip-Hop (Ultratop Flanders)	1
Belgium (Ultratop 50 Wallonia)	1
Canada Hot 100 (Billboard)	1
Chile Airplay (Monitor Latino)	11
Colombia Airplay (National-Report)	4
Czech Republic Singles Digital (ČNS IFPI)	3
Denmark (Tracklisten)	1
Dominican Republic (Monitor Latino)	13
Euro Digital Song Sales (Billboard)	1
Finland (Suomen virallinen lista)	10
France (SNEP)	1
France Airplay (SNEP)	1
Germany (GfK)	5
Hungary (Rádiós Top 40)	37
Hungary (Single Top 40)	7
Hungary (Stream Top 40)	4
Ireland (IRMA)	2
Israel International Airplay (Media Forest)	7
Italy (FIMI)	5
Japan Hot 100 (Billboard)	42
Mexico (Billboard Mexican Airplay)	2
Netherlands (Dutch Top 40)	2
Netherlands (Single Top 100)	1
New Zealand (Recorded Music NZ)	2
Norway (VG-lista)	4
Panama (Monitor Latino)	7
Poland Airplay (ZPAV)	52
Portugal (AFP)	1
Scottish Singles Sales (Official Charts)	5
Slovakia Singles Digital (ČNS IFPI)	1
South Africa (EMA)	1
South Korea International Chart (Gaon)	28
Spain (Promusicae)	2
Sweden (Sverigetopplistan)	2
Switzerland (Schweizer Hitparade)	9
UK Singles (Official Charts)	2
UK Hip Hop/R&B (Official Charts)	1
US Billboard Hot 100	1
US Dance Club Songs (Billboard)	1
US Dance Airplay (Billboard)	2
US Hot R&B/Hip-Hop Songs (Billboard)	1
US Pop Airplay (Billboard)	8
US Rhythmic Airplay (Billboard)	1

Chart (2023)	Peak position
Global 200 (Billboard)	100
US Digital Song Sales (Billboard)	35

=== Year-end charts ===
Chart (2016)	Position
Argentina (Monitor Latino)	69
Australia (ARIA)	40
Belgium (Ultratop Flanders)	39
Belgium R&B/Hip-Hop (Ultratop Flanders)	8
Belgium (Ultratop Wallonia)	36
Brazil (Brasil Hot 100)	10
Canada (Canadian Hot 100)	13
Denmark (Tracklisten)	22
France (SNEP)	20
Germany (Official German Charts)	43
Hungary (Single Top 40)	58
Israel (Media Forest)	41
Italy (FIMI)	28
Netherlands (Dutch Top 40)	43
Netherlands (Single Top 100)	16
New Zealand (Recorded Music NZ)	18
Spain (PROMUSICAE)	20
Sweden (Sverigetopplistan)	19
Switzerland (Schweizer Hitparade)	39
UK Singles (Official Charts Company)	9
US Billboard Hot 100	4
US Dance Club Songs (Billboard)	18
US Dance/Mix Show Airplay (Billboard)	36
US Hot R&B/Hip-Hop Songs (Billboard)	3
US Mainstream Top 40 (Billboard)	43
US Rhythmic (Billboard)	5
Worldwide (IFPI)	6

Chart (2017)	Position
Argentina (Monitor Latino)	89
South Korea International Chart (Gaon)	91

=== Decade-end charts ===
Chart (2010–2019)	Position
UK Singles (Official Charts Company)	90
US Billboard Hot 100	53
US Hot R&B/Hip-Hop Songs (Billboard)	24

== Certifications ==
Region	Certification	Certified units/sales
Australia (ARIA)	7× Platinum	490,000^{‡}
Belgium (BRMA)	Platinum	20,000^{‡}
Brazil (Pro-Música Brasil)	4× Diamond	1,000,000^{‡}
Canada (Music Canada)	9× Platinum	720,000^{‡}
Denmark (IFPI Danmark)	2× Platinum	180,000^{‡}
France (SNEP)	Diamond	233,333^{‡}
Germany (BVMI)	Platinum	400,000^{‡}
Italy (FIMI)	3× Platinum	150,000^{‡}
New Zealand (RMNZ)	5× Platinum	150,000^{‡}
Poland (ZPAV)	3× Platinum	150,000^{‡}
Portugal (AFP)	Platinum	10,000^{‡}
Spain (Promusicae)	2× Platinum	80,000^{‡}
Sweden (GLF)	4× Platinum	160,000^{‡}
United Kingdom (BPI)	4× Platinum	2,400,000^{‡}
United States (RIAA)	11× Platinum	11,000,000^{‡}
Summaries
Worldwide	—	32,500,000
^{‡} Sales+streaming figures based on certification alone.

== Release history ==
Country	Date	Format	Label	Ref.
Various	January 27, 2016	Digital download; streaming	Roc Nation; Westbury Road	
United States	January 27, 2016	Contemporary hit radio; rhythmic contemporary radio	Roc Nation; Westbury Road	
Italy	January 29, 2016	Radio airplay	Universal	
Various	March 18, 2016	Streaming (Remixes)	Roc Nation; Westbury Road	

== See also ==
- Artists with the most number-ones on the U.S. Hot 100
- List of best-selling singles
- List of Canadian Hot 100 number-one singles of 2016
- List of number-one hits of 2016 (France)
- List of UK R&B Singles Chart number ones of 2016
- List of Billboard Hot 100 number-one singles of 2016
- List of number-one singles of 2016 (South Africa)
- List of number-one dance singles of 2016 (U.S.)
