= Hazlett (singer) =

- Born: Mitchell Hazlett Lewis
- Origin: Brisbane, Australia
- Genre: Indie folk
- Occupation: Singer-songwriter
- Instrument: Vocals
- Years active: 2017–present
- Labels: Sony Music Australia; BLNK Music; Nettwerk Music Group
- Website: thisishazlett.com

Hazlett is the stage name of Australian indie folk singer-songwriter Mitchell Hazlett Lewis, who is based in Sweden.

== Early life ==
Hazlett grew up in Brisbane, Australia, where he got his first break as a singer/songwriter performing covers in pubs around his hometown.

== Career ==
Hazlett worked at an advertising agency before he pursued being a musician full-time. Before launching his solo project, he worked as a ghostwriter and bassist-for-hire. In 2017, he released his debut EP, Honey, Where Is My Home. In 2019, Australian Broadcasting Corporation's triple j Unearthed named him a feature artist.

Hazlett moved to Sweden and began working with producer and collaborator Freddy Alexander. Hazlett released his first record in 2017, an EP called Honey, Where Is My Home? Hazlett released the EP Thundering Hopes in 2020. In 2022, Atwood Magazine named Hazlett’s Oh Downhill EP as one of "The 22 Best EPs of 2022." His debut studio album, Bloom Mountain, followed in 2023 and was covered by Atwood Magazine and Nothing But Hope and Passion. In 2025, Holler profiled Hazlett ahead of the release of last night you said you missed me and his appearance opening for Noah Kahan at BST Hyde Park.

== Reception ==
In 2023, Music Republic Magazine named Hazlett "Best Acoustic Artist." Hazlett's single "Blame The Moon" has 6.5 million plays on YouTube Music.

Atwood Magazine called Hazlett’s follow-up Bloom Mountain an "indie folk reverie capturing the intimacy and intensity of inner reckoning and personal growth." In 2024, Hazlett went to a remote cabin in Sweden to record Goodbye To The Valley Low LP.

Reviews of Hazlett's 2025 album last night you said you missed me emphasized its subdued sound and themes of loneliness and longing. Clash called the album a "rewarding listen", while At The Barrier described it as a set of "sonic postcards" built from stripped-back ballads and comforting acoustic textures. Writing in Spectrum Culture, Domenic Strazzabosco described the record as "short and not flashy", adding that its songs develop through subtle production. In EARMILK, Leo Edworthy wrote that Hazlett captured longing in warm acoustics, though they noted that some listeners might find the album "samey", a quality they nonetheless regarded as part of its cohesion. Euphoria called the album a "raw, evocative and immersive soundscape." In the same year, Noah Kahan invited him to perform on the BST Hyde Park Arena show. Hazlett told Holler Magazine that it was his first time being inside London's Hyde Park. Hazlett recorded a Flood Magazine Sessions, performing "Tell Me Something" at BLNK Music studio in Södermalm, Sweden.

His songwriting was described by Songwriting Magazine as "introspective". Hazlett's studio albums include Bloom Mountain (2023) and last night you said you missed me (2025).

== Discography ==
YEAR	TITLE	LABEL	FORMAT	REF
2017	Honey, Where Is My Home	Sony Music Australia	EP	
2020	Thundering Hopes	BLNK Music/Nettwerk Music Group	EP	
2022	Oh Downhill	BLNK Music/Nettwerk Music Group	EP	
2023	Bloom Mountain	BLNK Music/Nettwerk Music Group	LP	
2023	Goodbye To The Valley Low	BLNK Music/Nettwerk Music Group	LP	
2025	last night you said you missed me	BLNK Music/Nettwerk Music Group	LP	
