= 2 Days into College =

Single by Aimee Carty
- Released: 8 December 2023
- Recorded: 2023
- Genre: Folk, pop
- Length: 2:48
- Label: Self-released
- Songwriter: Aimee Carty

Aimee Carty singles chronology
| "Painter" (2023) | "2 Days into College" (2023) | "Baker" (2024) |

"2 Days into College" is a song by Irish singer-songwriter Aimee Carty, released on December 8, 2023. The song rose to immense popularity on social media, receiving over 45 million streams and entering the official UK and Irish singles charts in February 2024.

== Background and popularity ==
Carty independently released "2 Days into College" on December 8, 2023, using the emotions she experienced when starting college at University College Dublin as inspiration for the song. In January 2024, Duke basketball player Jared McCain (now with the Oklahoma City Thunder) released a TikTok video of himself singing the song. McCain's video went viral and resulted in "2 Days into College" becoming a popular song on the app. Shortly after, North West uploaded a TikTok video of herself dancing to the song, which further boosted the song's popularity.

== Reception ==
The Central Trend described the song as a "love song for the students out there experiencing stress". Neon Music praised the song for having an authentic portrayal of the emotions felt by a student starting college, claiming Carty to be a "voice for a generation navigating the complexities of young adulthood".

== Charts ==
Chart performance for "2 Days into College"
| Chart (2024) | Peak position |
|---|---|
| Ireland (IRMA) | 23 |
| UK Indie (Official Charts) | 32 |
| UK Singles (Official Charts) | 84 |
| US Bubbling Under Hot 100 (Billboard) | 5 |
