= Henrik Jonzon =

Swedish songwriter, producer, musician

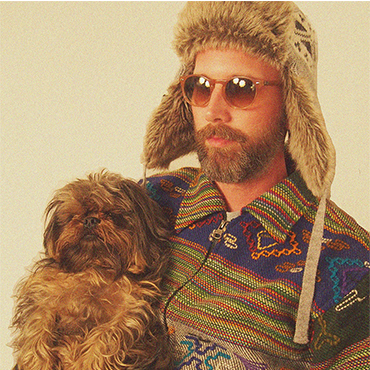
- Henrik Jonzon and his Brussels Griffon, Knut

Background information
- Born: Henrik Jonzon; Chicago, Illinois, United States
- Genres: R&B, pop, urban, indie rock
- Occupations: Musician, singer-songwriter
- Instruments: Vocals, guitar, keyboards, drums
- Years active: 2005–present
- Label: published by Mr Radar Music/Kobalt Music Group
- Website: mrradar.com/projects/henrik-jonzon/

Henrik Jonzon (born 15 April 1979) is a Swedish platinum record selling songwriter, producer, musician, and artist. He was born and grew up in Chicago. His music combines indie pop rock with urban, R&B and mainstream pop.

From 2013 Jonzon has been writing music for and collaborating with Zara Larsson, Paloma Faith, Elias, Rebecca & Fiona, Erik Rapp, Sabina Ddumba, Mando Diao and Naomi Pilgrim.

Jonzon is also the lead singer and songwriter of the Swedish indie pop band Nervous Nellie.

== Production and writing ==
=== Discography ===
Year	Artist	Album	Song
2014	Nervous Nellie	Where The Nightmare Gets In	"Beacons"
2014	Nervous Nellie	Where The Nightmare Gets In	"Eaten by Bears"
2014	Nervous Nellie	Where The Nightmare Gets In	"Gloves"
2014	Nervous Nellie	Where The Nightmare Gets In	"Skeletons"
2014	Nervous Nellie	Where The Nightmare Gets In	"You're So Sad (ft Paloma Faith)"
2014	Nervous Nellie	Where The Nightmare Gets In	"Cat Like Figure"
2014	Nervous Nellie	Where The Nightmare Gets In	"Shoulder"
2014	Nervous Nellie	Where The Nightmare Gets In	"The Violence"
2014	Nervous Nellie	Where The Nightmare Gets In	"Dead Dirt"
2014	Nervous Nellie	Where The Nightmare Gets In	"No Sound"
2015	Freja	White Magic Spells – EP	"Young Heart"
2015	Freja	White Magic Spells – EP	"Ashes"
2015	Freja	White Magic Spells – EP	"Lonely"
2015	Rebecca & Fiona	Party Hard	"Sayonara"
2016	Kilian & Jo feat. Erik Rapp	—N/a	"Suburbia"
2016	Rebecca & Fiona	Party Hard	"Drugstore Lovin'"
2016	LØVER	—N/a	"Look What I Got'"
2016	Naomi Pilgrim	—N/a	"Sink Like a Stone"
2016	Chris Brenner	Crash Landing	"I Don't Know"
2016	SMNM	Parental Advisory Explicit Content	"Think Twice'"
2017	1987	—N/a	"Amerika"
2017	Ben Pearce ft. Elias	—N/a	"Crescent (Running)"
2017	Leslie Clio	Purple	"Fragile"
2017	Miriam Bryant	Bye Bye Blue	"Sad Songs"
2017	Miriam Bryant	Bye Bye Blue	"Teddybear"
2017	Jumpa	—N/a	"Body Love"
2017	Wankelmut ft Björn Dixgård	—N/a	"I Keep Calling"
2017	Dotter	—N/a	"Rebellion"
2017	Alex Mattson	—N/a	"All About You"
2017	Midnight Boy	—N/a	"Bombay Haze"

== Discography ==
=== Nervous Nellie ===
==== Albums ====
- Don't Think Feel (2005)
- Ego 6 the Id (2008)
- Why Dawn Is Called Mourning (2010)
- Where the Nightmare Gets In (2012)

==== Extended plays ====
- Gloves EP (2014)

==== Singles ====
- "Don't Think Feel" (2010)
- "Skeletons" (2013)
- "Shoulder" (2014)
