= If You Were Here Tonight =

Single by Alexander O'Neal

from the album Alexander O'Neal
- Released: June 4, 1985
- Genre: R&B; smooth soul
- Label: Tabu
- Songwriter: Monte Moir
- Producer: Monte Moir

Alexander O'Neal singles chronology
"Innocent" (1985)	"If You Were Here Tonight" (1985)	"A Broken Heart Can Mend" (1985)

"If You Were Here Tonight" is a song written by Monte Moir and recorded by American recording artist Alexander O'Neal. It is the second single from the singer's self-titled debut solo album, Alexander O'Neal (1985). Following the successful chart performances of the single "Innocent", "If You Were Here Tonight" was released as the album's second single.

"If You Were Here Tonight" is a melancholy ballad about the break-up of a relationship. It is the only song out of three songs on the album written and produced by Monte Moir to be released as a single.

== Chart performance ==
The song was O'Neal's first successful solo single in the United Kingdom, reaching No. 13 on the UK Singles Chart in March 1986. It had originally peaked at No. 81 in August 1985, but following the top ten success of the Cherrelle duet "Saturday Love", the single re-entered the charts in early 1986. It remains one of his most aired songs on British radio.

In the US, the song became his second R&B hit, reaching No. 17 on the Hot Black Singles chart. It was also one of his only two hits to chart in Ireland (reaching No. 20).

== Track listing and formats ==
- US 7" Vinyl single (ZS4 05418)

A "If You Were Here Tonight (Remix)" – 3:40
AA "If You Were Here Tonight (Soft Version)" – 5:06

- UK 12" Vinyl maxi single (QTA 12.6391)

A "If You Were Here Tonight" – 6:08
B1 "What's Missing" – 5:42
B2 "If You Were Here Tonight (Soft Version)" – 5:06

- Europe 12" Vinyl single (TA 6391)

A "If You Were Here Tonight" – 6:08
B1 "Innocent (Instrumental)" – 9:54
B2 "If You Were Here Tonight (Soft Version)" – 5:06

- UK 7" Vinyl single (A 6391)

A "If You Were Here Tonight (Remix)" – 3:40
B "If You Were Here Tonight (Soft Version)" – 5:06

== Charts ==
=== Weekly charts ===
Chart (1985)	Peak position
US Hot Black Singles (Billboard)	17
UK Singles (Official Charts)	13
Irish Singles Chart	20
New Zealand Recorded Music NZ	42

== Cover versions ==
- Jamaican reggae singer Wayne Wonder covered the song as "If You Were Here" for Penthouse Records, produced by Donovan Germain and Dave Kelly. It appeared on his self-titled album.
- English singer Matt Goss, formerly of the band Bros, released his version as a single in 1996, which peaked at No. 23 on the UK Singles Chart.

== Sampling ==
- The song's instrumental was sampled as the basis for the popular dancehall beat called the "Sail Away Riddim" in 1998. This was done by producing an uptempo dancehall beat woven around the airy keyboard riff from "If You Were Here Tonight". The Sail Away riddim was used to produce a 12-track "one-rhythm" album of songs using the same instrumental.
- Elements of the song were used by John Forté on the song "Move On (I'm Leavin')" from the soundtrack to the 1997 motion picture Sprung.
- It was sampled by Ras Kass on the song "It Is What It Is" from his 1998 album Rasassination.
- Barbadian singer Rihanna's 2016 song "Work", which reached number one in the United States, credits Monte Moir as a songwriter, and its beat was compared to the Sail Away Riddim.
