= Innocent (Alexander O'Neal song) =

Single by Alexander O'Neal

from the album Alexander O'Neal
- B-side: "Are You the One?"
- Released: 1985
- Recorded: 1984
- Genre: R&B; electronic; funk; soul
- Length: 10:31 (album version); 4:43 (single version)
- Label: Tabu
- Songwriter: Jimmy Jam and Terry Lewis
- Producers: Jimmy Jam and Terry Lewis

Alexander O'Neal singles chronology
"Innocent" (1985)	"If You Were Here Tonight" (1985)

Music video
- "Innocent" on YouTube

"Innocent" is a song written by Jimmy Jam and Terry Lewis and recorded by American recording artist Alexander O'Neal, whose original version was released as his first solo single in 1985 on Tabu Records. It is also a single from the singer's self-titled debut solo studio album, Alexander O'Neal (1985). The song's distinctive backing vocals were performed by Cherrelle. The song's time was edited for release as a single, with the album version being a medley consisting of "Innocent"/"Alex 9000"/"Innocent II", and was just over six minutes longer.

== Release ==
The song was notably his only single from the album not to chart in the UK. However, the single became an immediate success in the US, reaching #11 on the Hot R&B/Hip-Hop Songs chart.

== Track listing and formats ==
- US 12" Vinyl Single (4Z9 05140)

A "Innocent" – 10:34
B "Innocent" (Instrumental) – 9:54

- US 7" Vinyl Single (ZS4 04718)

A "Innocent" – 4:43
B "Are You the One?" – 3:41

- Europe 12" Vinyl Single (TBUA 12.6163)

A "Innocent" (Extended Dance Remix) – 10:34
B "Innocent" (Instrumental) – 9:54

== Charts ==
Chart (1985)	Peak position
US Billboard Hot 100	101
US Hot R&B/Hip-Hop Songs (Billboard)	11
