= Monte Moir =

American songwriter, producer and musician

- Born: Monte Moir; September 10, 1958 (age 68)
- Origin: Minneapolis, Minnesota, United States
- Genres: R&B; soul; funk; pop; new wave; dance
- Occupations: Singer; keyboardist; songwriter
- Instrument: Keyboards
- Years active: 1981–present
- Labels: Warner Bros.; Paisley Park
- Member of: The Time
- Website: montemoir.com

Monte Moir (born September 10, 1958) is an American songwriter, producer and musician best known as the keyboardist of Morris Day's band The Time and songwriter of many notable American artists.

== Biography ==
Monte Moir is one of the original keyboardists for The Time, as well as a songwriter and producer for Janet Jackson, Alexander O'Neal, Gladys Knight, as well as the duo Deja (Curt Jones & Starleana Young). He is also credited for working with Prince, Vanity 6, Deniece Williams, Thelma Houston, Steven Dante, Lolly Pop, Precious Wilson and various other artists.

Some of his greatest writing successes were writing the first side of Alexander O'Neal's solo debut – including the quiet storm classic "If You Were Here Tonight" – and "The Pleasure Principle' by Janet Jackson. Patti Austin and Thelma Houston are other notable artists he wrote classics for as part of Jimmy Jam and Terry Lewis's 'The Secret'. Monte is something of a cult writing figure in the world of soulful music. "In My Life" by Ruby Turner as well as Steven Dante's "It's Only Love" are key examples of his songwriting.

He left The Time soon after Jam and Lewis were released by Prince, following conflicting writing interests with the S.O.S. Band and failing to make a concert. However, he rejoined The Time for their Pandemonium album and Prince's film Graffiti Bridge, in the late 1980s when the original Time members reunited.

Moir initially left The Time shortly before the filming of Purple Rain. However, Moir returned to the band 1990, and stayed for many years, but would eventually again leave The Time in 2019.

Moir continues to compose his own material and produce for various artists. He was credited on Rihanna's 2016 Billboard number one hit "Work" and most recently surfaced at the 2020 Grammy Award Salute to Prince.
