= Japanese Singles Collection -Greatest Hits- (Janet Jackson album) =

- Standard edition cover

Greatest hits album by Janet Jackson
- Released: August 24, 2022
- Recorded: 1982–2004
- Genres: Pop; R&B
- Label: Universal Music Group

Janet Jackson chronology
Unbreakable (2015)	Japanese Singles Collection -Greatest Hits- (2022)

Japanese Singles Collection -Greatest Hits- is the fourth greatest hits album by American singer Janet Jackson. It was released on August 24, 2022, in Japan by Universal Music Group as a part of the Japanese Singles Collection album series. The double-disc album features 38 of Jackson's singles released over the previous 40 years, as well as a DVD containing 44 of Jackson's music videos. Its release was timed to commemorate the fortieth anniversary of the release of Jackson's debut album.

The collection spans Jackson's full career, collecting singles from her first album Janet Jackson (1982) to her eighth studio album Damita Jo (2004). The accompanying DVD features music videos from Jackson's second album Dream Street (1984) through her second greatest hits album Number Ones (2009), including seven of Jackson's music videos on DVD for the first time. The collection also includes "Start Anew", a single previously only released on the first Japanese pressing of Jackson's third album, Control.

== Track listings ==
Disc 1
No.	Title	Writer(s)	Album	Length
1.	"Young Love" (7" version)	René Moore; Angela Winbush	Janet Jackson, 1982	3:43
2.	"Don't Stand Another Chance"	Marlon Jackson; John Barnes	Dream Street, 1984	4:19
3.	"Two to the Power of Love" (duet with Cliff Richard)	Peter Beckett; Stephen Alan Kipner	Dream Street	3:10
4.	"Start Anew"	Ralph McCarthy; Yuji Toriyama	Control Japanese first pressing edition, 1986	4:19
5.	"What Have You Done for Me Lately"	James Harris III; Terry Lewis; Janet Jackson	Control	3:34
6.	"Nasty"	Harris; Lewis; Jackson	Control	3:46
7.	"When I Think of You"	Harris; Lewis; Jackson	Control	3:57
8.	"Control"	Harris; Lewis; Jackson	Control	3:29
9.	"Let's Wait Awhile"	Harris; Lewis; Jackson; Melanie Andrews	Control	4:38
10.	"The Pleasure Principle"	Monte Moir	Control	5:00
11.	"Miss You Much" (7" edit)	Lewis; Harris	Janet Jackson's Rhythm Nation 1814, 1989	3:57
12.	"Rhythm Nation" (7" Edit)	Jackson; Harris; Lewis	Janet Jackson's Rhythm Nation 1814	4:31
13.	"Escapade"	Jackson; Harris; Lewis	Janet Jackson's Rhythm Nation 1814	4:47
14.	"Alright" (7" R&B remix with rap) (featuring Heavy D)	Jackson; Harris; Lewis	Janet Jackson's Rhythm Nation 1814	4:35
15.	"Come Back to Me" (7" I’m Beggin' You Mix)	Jackson; Harris; Lewis	Janet Jackson's Rhythm Nation 1814	4:48
16.	"Black Cat" (Video Mix/Short Solo)	Jackson	Janet Jackson's Rhythm Nation 1814	4:34
17.	"Love Will Never Do (Without You)" (single version)	Harris; Lewis	Janet Jackson's Rhythm Nation 1814	4:35
18.	"State of the World" (United Nation 7")	Jackson; Harris; Lewis	Janet Jackson's Rhythm Nation 1814	4:23
19.	"That's the Way Love Goes"	Jackson; Harris; Lewis; Fred Wesley; Charles Bobbit; John Starks; James Brown	Janet., 1993	4:27

Disc 2
No.	Title	Writer(s)	Album	Length
1.	"If" (radio edit)	Jackson; Lewis; Harris	Janet.	3:51
2.	"Again"	Jackson; Harris; Lewis	Janet.	3:50
3.	"Because of Love"	Jackson; Harris; Lewis	Janet.	4:16
4.	"Any Time, Any Place" (R. Kelly remix)	Jackson; Lewis; Harris	Janet.	5:13
5.	"You Want This" (remix; featuring MC Lyte)	Harris; Lewis; Jackson; MC Lyte	Janet.	4:48
6.	"What'll I Do" (Dave Navarro mix)	Jackson; Mick Jagger; Keith Richards; Steve Cropper; Joe Shamwell	Janet.	4:20
7.	"Runaway"	Jackson; Harris; Lewis	Design of a Decade: 1986–1996, 1995	3:36
8.	"Twenty Foreplay" (Slow Jam international edit)	Jackson; Harris; Lewis	Design of a Decade: 1986–1996	4:29
9.	"Got 'til It's Gone" (radio edit; featuring Q-Tip and Joni Mitchell)	Jackson; Lewis; Harris; René Elizondo Jr.; Roberta Mitchell; Kamaal Ibn Fareed	The Velvet Rope, 1997	3:37
10.	"Together Again" (radio edit)	Jackson; Lewis; Harris; Elizondo	The Velvet Rope	4:09
11.	"Every Time"	Jackson; Lewis; Harris; Elizondo	The Velvet Rope	4:20
12.	"Go Deep"	Jackson; Lewis; Harris	The Velvet Rope	4:45
13.	"You"	Jackson; Lewis; Harris; Elizondo; Harold Brown; Sylvester Allen; Morris Dickerson; Howard Scott; Leroy Jordan; Lee Oskar; Charles Miller	The Velvet Rope	4:45
14.	"Doesn't Really Matter" (radio edit)	Jackson; Harris; Lewis	Nutty Professor II: The Klumps Soundtrack, 2000 and All for You, 2001	4:19
15.	"All for You" (radio edit)	Jackson; Harris; Lewis; Wayne Garfield; David Romani; Mauro Malavasi	All for You	4:26
16.	"Someone to Call My Lover" (single edit)	Jackson; Lewis; Harris; Dewey Bunnell	All for You	4:16
17.	"Son of a Gun (I Betcha Think This Song Is About You)" (the original Flyte Time remix; featuring Carly Simon and Missy Elliott)	Jackson; Lewis; Harris; Carly Simon; Melissa Elliott	All for You	4:15
18.	"Just a Little While" (radio edit)	Jackson; Dallas Austin	Damita Jo, 2004	4:01
19.	"All Nite (Don't Stop)"	Jackson; Harris; Lewis; Tony "Prof T" Tolbert; Anders Bagge; Arnthor Birgisson; Herbie Hancock; Paul Jackson; Melvin Ragin	Damita Jo	3:29

DVD
No.	Title	Album	Length
1.	"Dream Street^{[a]}"	Dream Street	3:51
2.	"What Have You Done for Me Lately"	Control	3:48
3.	"Nasty"	Control	4:31
4.	"When I Think of You"	Control	4:45
5.	"Control"	Control	9:04
6.	"Let's Wait Awhile"	Control	5:10
7.	"The Pleasure Principle"	Control	5:11
8.	"Miss You Much"	Janet Jackson's Rhythm Nation 1814	4:19
9.	"Rhythm Nation"	Janet Jackson's Rhythm Nation 1814	4:25
10.	"Escapade"	Janet Jackson's Rhythm Nation 1814	4:46
11.	"Alright"	Janet Jackson's Rhythm Nation 1814	7:27
12.	"Come Back to Me"	Janet Jackson's Rhythm Nation 1814	5:21
13.	"Black Cat"	Janet Jackson's Rhythm Nation 1814	4:57
14.	"Love Will Never Do (Without You)"	Janet Jackson's Rhythm Nation 1814	4:50
15.	"The Knowledge^{[a]}"	Janet Jackson's Rhythm Nation 1814	2:53
16.	"That's the Way Love Goes"	Janet.	5:20
17.	"If"	Janet.	5:15
18.	"If (all dance version)"	Janet.	5:15
19.	"Again"	Janet.	3:43
20.	"Because of Love"	Janet.	4:11
21.	"Any Time, Any Place"	Janet.	4:32
22.	"You Want This"	Janet.	5:16
23.	"Whoops Now"	Janet.	3:24
24.	"What'll I Do^{[a]}"	Janet.	2:47
25.	"Runaway"	Design of a Decade: 1986–1996	3:40
26.	"Twenty Foreplay^{[a]}"	Design of a Decade: 1986–1996	4:21
27.	"Got 'til It's Gone" (featuring Q-Tip and Joni Mitchell)	The Velvet Rope	4:12
28.	"Together Again"	The Velvet Rope	4:17
29.	"I Get Lonely"	The Velvet Rope	4:45
30.	"Every Time"	The Velvet Rope	4:18
31.	"Go Deep"	The Velvet Rope	4:34
32.	"You"	The Velvet Rope	4:05
33.	"Doesn't Really Matter"	Nutty Professor II: The Klumps Soundtrack and All for You	4:38
34.	"All for You"	All for You	4:36
35.	"Someone to Call My Lover"	All for You	4:34
36.	"Son of a Gun (I Betcha Think This Song Is About You)" (featuring Carly Simon and Missy Elliott)	All for You	4:15
37.	"Just a Little While"	Damita Jo	4:11
38.	"I Want You"	Damita Jo	3:38
39.	"All Nite (Don't Stop)"	Damita Jo	4:28
40.	"Call on Me" (featuring Nelly)	20 Y.O., 2006	3:54
41.	"So Excited^{[a]}" (featuring Khia)	20 Y.O.	3:23
42.	"Feedback"	Discipline, 2008	4:04
43.	"Rock with U^{[a]}"	Discipline	3:54
44.	"Make Me"	Number Ones, 2009	3:50

Notes

- ^{^a} denotes first time release on DVD

== Charts ==
Chart (2022)	Peak position
Japanese Albums (Oricon)	25
