= You (Janet Jackson song) =

Single by Janet Jackson

from the album The Velvet Rope
- B-side: "Every Time" (Jam & Lewis disco mix); "Accept Me"
- Released: September 28, 1998
- Recorded: 1997
- Studio: Flyte Tyme (Edina, Minnesota)
- Genre: Trip hop
- Length: 4:42
- Label: Virgin
- Songwriters: Janet Jackson; James Harris III; Terry Lewis; René Elizondo Jr.; Harold Brown; Sylvester Allen; Morris Dickerson; Howard Scott; Leroy Jordan; Lee Oskar; Charles Miller
- Producers: Janet Jackson; Jimmy Jam and Terry Lewis

Janet Jackson singles chronology
"Luv Me, Luv Me" (1998)	"You" (1998)	"What's It Gonna Be?!" (1999)

Music video
- "You" on YouTube

"You" is a song by American singer Janet Jackson from her sixth studio album, The Velvet Rope (1997). Written and produced by Jackson along with her collaborators Jimmy Jam and Terry Lewis, it samples "The Cisco Kid" by War, with its composers receiving writing credits due to the sample's usage. It was released as the album's fifth single on September 28, 1998, in the United Kingdom, by Virgin Records. The track is a trip hop song with elements of funk, which lyrically depicts Jackson calling for a stop to a life spent pleasing others; some journalists thought the lyrics were directed at her brother Michael, and compared her vocals to those of his on the song.

"You" received positive reviews from music critics, with many placing emphasis on Jackson's vocals. The single did not chart anywhere. A music video was produced, directed by David Mallet, and contains scenes of Jackson's Velvet Rope World Tour (1998–99), and served as a promotional clip for the tour. "You" was performed on the aforementioned tour, and on the 2019 Janet Jackson: A Special 30th Anniversary Celebration of Rhythm Nation tour, as well as on both of her Las Vegas residency shows, Janet Jackson: Metamorphosis (2019), and Janet Jackson: Las Vegas (2024–25).

== Background and composition ==
In 1997, Jackson released her sixth studio album The Velvet Rope, which chronicled her emotional breakdown, stemming from self-hatred, childhood humiliation, physical abuse, and distorted body image. It produced two top-three successes on the US Billboard Hot 100 – "Together Again" and "I Get Lonely" – with the former topping the chart. "Got 'til It's Gone" and "Go Deep" were also released, but were unable to enter the chart due to the lack of a commercial release in the country. "You" was then chosen as the record's fifth single in the United Kingdom and was released on September 28, 1998, by Virgin Records; however, it was ineligible to chart there. It later received a release in Japan on December 23, 1998, by EMI Music Japan.

"You" was written and produced by Jackson alongside production duo Jimmy Jam and Terry Lewis, with additional writing by René Elizondo Jr, Jackson's husband at the time, though this fact was kept secret until the couple filed for divorce in 2000. Due to the sample's usage, Harold Brown, Sylvester Allen, Morris Dickerson, Howard Scott, Leroy Jordan, Lee Oskar, and Charles Miller also received songwriting credits. Alex Richbourg played the drum machine, while Jam and Lewis played additional instruments over the sample on the track. Richbourg, Jackson, and Jam and Lewis provided the rhythm arrangement, with the latter three doing the vocal arrangement. It was recorded and mixed by Steve Hodge, with assistance by Xavier Smith, and mastered by Brian "Big Bass" Gardner, assisted by Mike Odozzi, at Bernie Grundman Mastering in Hollywood, along with all tracks present on The Velvet Rope.

"You"
A 29-second sample of the song, demonstrating Jackson's electronically processed vocals.

"You" is a trip hop song with elements of funk. Shannon Miller of The A.V. Club noted that a "thumping bass claims centerstage" in the song, "toeing the line between rock and trip hop". It contains a prominent sample from War's 1972 song "The Cisco Kid". The track also contains electronically processed vocals. The lyrics of "You" depict Jackson calling for a stop to a life spent pleasing others without knowing what you want for yourself, while pointing an accusing finger at an intimate who has "learned to survive in [their] fictitious world". She sings, "Check in the mirror, my friend / No lies will be told then / Pointin' the finger again / You can't blame nobody but you". Vibe's Danyel Smith felt that the line was a reference to her brother Michael's song "Man in the Mirror" (1987), and thought the lyrics were dedicated to him. Smith's sentiment was later echoed by other journalists. But Jackson confirmed that she is referring to herself in "You," despite Jackson's vocals on "You" being compared to those of Michael, to which she responded: "You know what? When we did 'You', I thought the ad-libs sounded too much like him, so I re-did them. But I guess I didn't make them sound different enough." However, other critics saw the song as a self-examination, talking about Jackson withholding her feelings of doubt and inadequacy for the sake of her fans and admirers.

== Critical reception ==
"You" was met with positive reviews from music critics. J.D. Considine from The Baltimore Sun called it "thumping". According to the Sunday Mirror's Ian Hyland, the track was one of the best club tunes Jackson had ever done. From The Guardian, Michael Odell commented that it replicated the "epic pop of Rhythm Nation", while Larry Katz from CNN wrote that "You" depicted a "wonderfully woozy sounding Janet". Howard Cohen from the Miami Herald opined that The Velvet Rope "finds its true theme buried within the song". Chuck Beard of the Tallahassee Democrat saw "You" as "another sizzler" from the album, with "sexy growls from Jackson and a bubbling bass line". According to the Chicago Tribune's Greg Kot, "When Jackson catches a groove, the album takes off", citing "You" as an example, as she "dares to sound ragged and disembodied as she sing-speaks", while complimenting its "galvanic bass melodies". Andrew Le from Renowned for Sound thought that the song highlights Jackson's vocal versatility, as it encompasses "emotionally weary performances in the verses, reassuring backing vocals and demented, distorted and claustrophobic cries for help in the choruses".

Sarah Davis of Dotmusic felt that the track finds Jackson "at her funkiest", noting a "hard-edged groove", and her vocals "alternating between an intimate tone and an almost menacing delivery". For Roger Catlin of the Hartford Courant, Jackson's "speedy phrasing and lashing out" on the song recalled her work on "Scream" (1995), a duet with her brother. Michael Corcoran from the Austin American-Statesman agreed, saying that "You" would have "listeners checking the liner notes for brother Michael's name", as her vocals were a "knockoff of Michael's lashbacks" on "Scream" and "Money" (1995). Tampa Bay Times's Erika D. Peterman noted that Jackson's "usually wispy voice sounds almost menacing on You". For The New York Times, Jon Pareles wrote that the singer "deploys her small voice shrewdly" on the album, creating a "jaded growl" on "You". Saeed Saeed of The National saw it as "a vehicle for her most lacerating set of lyrics to date", while for Retropop, "You" contains some of the singer's most pointed lyrics to date.

== Music video ==
The music video for "You" was directed by David Mallet. It was filmed in Sweden, during one of the concerts of the 1998–99 Velvet Rope World Tour. The video relies on soft light and focus to capture the concert's "illustrious glamour". It contains highlights from one of the tour's shows, including the moment when Jackson pulled 16-year-old Wilson Kelvin McQuade on stage and did a lap dance for him during the performance for "Rope Burn". Jackson used the music video as a promotional clip for the tour. Author Ayanna Dozier noted how it "carries the visuals from the tour as a way to have the spectacle and allure of the 'live' travel to those who have yet to participate with the encounter just yet", also serving as a reminder of the show for those who had already attended one of the concerts. The visual later appeared on the DVD edition of All for You (2001), on the video compilation From Janet to Damita Jo: The Videos (2004), and on the two-CD + DVD compilation Japanese Singles Collection -Greatest Hits- (2022). In a review for From Janet to Damita Jo: The Videos, Ben Hogwood from MusicOMH considered Jackson's routine in the video to be "too severe", and added that her "disembodied voice and some bondage-type gear don't quite add up".

== Live performances ==
"You" was included on the 1998–99 Velvet Rope World Tour and was the third song on the setlist, following "Velvet Rope" and "If". The performance was preceded by Jackson engaging in "a long staring contest with the audience", which was "probably just to allow enough time for her dancers to get changed", as noted by Toronto Sun's Jane Stevenson; she deemed it "one of the strangest moments in the concert". Jackson and her dancers performed the song in black body suits and white masks, although Stevenson observed that "the scowl on her face got downright spooky at times". For Teri vanHorn from MTV News, numbers such as "You" provided "dance bliss" throughout the concert. The performance of the song at the October 11, 1998, show in New York City, at the Madison Square Garden, was broadcast during a special titled The Velvet Rope: Live in Madison Square Garden by HBO, and it was included on the concert's VHS home video release, The Velvet Rope Tour: Live in Concert (1999).

Two decades later in 2019, Jackson performed "You" on her Janet Jackson: Metamorphosis residency in Las Vegas. It was noted by Idolator's Mike Nied as one of the "hidden gems" present on the show which Jackson had not performed in years. Mark Gray from People noted that despite it not being one of her greatest hits, it was included on the concert. Later that year, it was also included on the setlist for the Janet Jackson: A Special 30th Anniversary Celebration of Rhythm Nation tour, which commemorated the 30th anniversary of the release of her fourth studio album, Janet Jackson's Rhythm Nation 1814 (1989), and carried a similar setlist to that of the Las Vegas residency. In a review for the concert, Jon Bream from the Star Tribune stated that even though her "long copper curls obliterated her visage" during much of the show, Jackson could not erase the "don’t-lie-to-me look" during the performance of "You". Jackson also featured the song on the setlist for her 2024–25 Janet Jackson: Las Vegas residency.

== Track listings ==
European CD single

1. "You" (single edit) – 3:56
2. "You" (album version) – 4:42

Japanese CD single

1. "You" (album version) – 4:42
2. "Every Time" (Jam & Lewis Disco Mix) – 4:16
3. "Accept Me" – 4:07

US video single

1. "You" (short version) (video) – 4:13

== Credits and personnel ==
Credits adapted from The Velvet Rope liner notes.

- Janet Jackson – vocals, songwriter, producer, rhythm and vocal arrangement
- James Harris III – songwriter, producer, additional instruments, rhythm and vocal arrangement
- Terry Lewis – songwriter, producer, additional instruments, rhythm and vocal arrangement
- René Elizondo Jr. – songwriter
- Harold Brown – songwriter
- Sylvester Allen – songwriter
- Morris Dickerson – songwriter
- Howard Scott – songwriter
- Leroy Jordan – songwriter
- Lee Oskar – songwriter
- Charles Miller – songwriter
- Alex Richbourg – drum machine, rhythm arrangement
- Steve Hodge – mixing
- Xavier Smith – assistant engineer
- Brian "Big Bass" Gardner – mastering
- Mike Odozzi – assistant mastering

== Release history ==
Release dates and formats for "You"
Region	Date	Format(s)	Label(s)	Ref.
United Kingdom	September 28, 1998	CD single	Virgin Records	
Japan	December 23, 1998	CD single	EMI Music Japan	
