= Janet Jackson as a gay icon =

Aspect of American singer's reputation

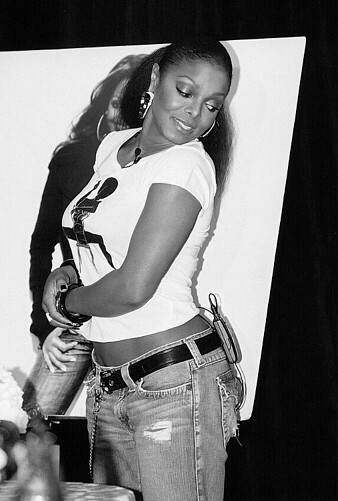
Janet Jackson in 2006

Janet Jackson is an American pop and R&B singer and actress. Jackson garnered a substantial gay following during the 1990s as she gained prominence in popular music. Recognized as a long-term ally of the LGBTQ community, Jackson received the GLAAD Media Award for Outstanding Music Album for her Grammy Award-winning sixth studio album The Velvet Rope (1997), which spoke out against homophobia and embraced same-sex love. In 2005, Jackson received the Humanitarian Award from the Human Rights Campaign and AIDS Project Los Angeles in recognition of her involvement in raising funds for AIDS Charities and received the Vanguard Award at the 19th Annual GLAAD Media Awards in 2008. In June 2012, Jackson announced she was executive producing a documentary on the lives of transgender people around the world titled Truth, saying she agreed to sign on to help stop discrimination against the transgender community.

== The Velvet Rope and AIDS charities ==
During the recording of Jackson's sixth studio album The Velvet Rope, the singer reportedly suffered from depression, which became a central theme to the album among other subjects including domestic abuse, low self-esteem, sadomasochism, homophobia and sexual orientation. In his review of the album, Neil McCormick of The Daily Telegraph observed, "[Jackson] even makes a bid for gay icon status, delivering a diva-ish performance reminiscent of Diana Ross on 'Together Again' (a post-AIDS pop song), singing a paean to homosexuality on the jazzy 'Free Xone' and finishing with a lesbian reinterpretation of Rod Stewart's 'Tonight's the Night'." The song "Free Xone" dealt specifically with homophobia and same-sex relationships. Speculation over Jackson's own sexual orientation began circulating after the release of The Velvet Rope—particularly regarding her cover version of Rod Stewart's "Tonight's the Night (Gonna Be Alright)"—however, Jackson denied rumors that she has had sexual relationships with other women.

I don't mind people thinking that I'm gay or calling me gay. People are going to believe whatever they want. Yes, I hang out at gay clubs, but other clubs too. I go where the music is good. I love people regardless of sexual preference, regardless of race. No, I am not bisexual. I have been linked with dancers in our group because we are so close. I grew up in a big family. I love being affectionate. I love intimacy and I am not afraid to show it. We fall asleep in each other's arms. We hug, we kiss, but there is nothing beyond that. Because [ René Elizondo Jr. ] and I broke up, it's like people need some sort of drama, some sort of gossip.

— Janet Jackson, Ebony

The album's second single "Together Again", a hit in several countries, became an homage to loved ones Jackson has lost to AIDS, as well as an elegy to AIDS victims and their families worldwide. The upbeat dance song was arranged to celebrate the spirit of those who have passed on, rather than mourn their deaths, as Jackson comments. A portion of the single's sales were donated by Jackson to The American Foundation for AIDS Research. On November 17, 1997, Jackson was honored by the National Black Lesbian and Gay Leadership Forum for the album's sexual orientation-related content, in addition to receiving the award for Outstanding Music Album at the 9th Annual GLAAD Media Awards in 1998. In June 2005, Jackson was given the Humanitarian Award by the Human Rights Campaign and AIDS Project Los Angeles in honor of her activism.

What I've learned in these recent months is that there is a light at the end of the tunnel, and it's real. It's a beautiful light that both comforts our minds and strengthens our souls. Tonight my heart is filled with gratitude for that light. I'm so grateful that prayers are answered, that faith is rewarded and tolerance is celebrated as a virtue. I'm grateful that God is of unconditional love.

— Janet Jackson, ABC News

She has also been a strong advocate of practicing safe sex as a means of inhibiting the spread of the AIDS virus, criticizing those who are "careless" when it comes to sexual intercourse.

== LGBTQ social movements ==
LGBTQ social movements, which include the Gay and Lesbian Rights Movement, Gay Liberation, lesbian feminism, and transgender activism, have often garnered celebrity endorsement from many entertainers including Jackson. She has often voiced her support for same-sex marriage, advocating all people have the right to fall in love. In 2008, Jackson appeared in a public service announcement sponsored by the Logo television network and the Gay, Lesbian and Straight Education Network (GLSEN) in response to the E.O. Green School shooting. The announcement discusses the murder of fifteen-year-old Lawrence "Larry" King and the safety of LGBTQ youth in public schools. Jackson states that "none of us are safe, until all of us are safe". On April 26, 2008, fellow gay icon Ellen DeGeneres presented Jackson with the Vanguard Award at the 19th Annual GLAAD Media Awards at the Kodak Theatre in Los Angeles.

We are delighted to honor Janet Jackson at the 19th Annual GLAAD Media Awards in Los Angeles as such a visible, welcoming and inclusive ally of the lesbian, gay, bisexual and transgender (LGBT) community. Ms. Jackson has a tremendous following inside the LGBT community and out, and having her stand with us against the defamation that LGBT people still face in our country is extremely significant.

— GLAAD President Neil G. Giuliano

Jackson spoke with Larry King on CNN, supporting the It Gets Better Project and The Trevor Project, a non-profit organization providing crisis and suicide prevention for LGBTQ youth, in light of the high-profile suicides committed in Fall, 2010. She stated: "(I was) one of those kids ... holding everything inside ... internalizing everything. And that really can affect you, and feeling helpless and hopeless, and finding that person that you can trust, that adult, like I did later on in life, that I felt comfortable and safe to tell my issues, my worries, my pains, my aches to. This is what the Trevor Project is really all about. And they have a 24-hour hotline ... There's someone there that you can speak with 24 hours that will be there for you." She made an official It Gets Better video which was released on December 1, 2010.

Jackson is currently producing a documentary on the lives of transgender people around the world titled "Truth", saying she agreed to sign on to help stop discrimination against the transgender community. "All people are very important to me. I've been fortunate to make friends and learn about very different lives," Jackson said in a statement. " 'Truth' is our small chance to ask that you try and understand someone who lives their life in a way that is a little bit different from yours, even though all of our hearts are the same. We want to stop the hate and find understanding." Director Robert Jason, who previously directed the Style Network documentary "Style Exposed: Born Male, Living Female," about four transgender New Yorkers, said Jackson will play a prominent part in the finished product. "Janet Jackson will take us on a visually innovative, cerebral journey through the turbulent lives of transgendered people of all ages around the world and their epic struggle for equality," he said in a statement announcing the project. "This film will highlight landmark mainstream stories and provide a glimpse at others that will change the gender landscape of the world forever. Just as it is hard to believe that there ever was a time when different components of society were required to use separate drinking fountains, it is as incredible that one's gender expression remains just such a target for discrimination." Jackson is working behind-the-scenes on the movie and will also take part in some of the on-camera interviews as well.
