= The Velvet Rope Tour: Live in Concert =

The Velvet Rope Tour: Live In Concert

Video by Janet Jackson
- Released: March 9, 1999
- Recorded: October 11, 1998
- Venues: Madison Square Garden, New York City
- Genres: R&B; pop
- Length: 121 minutes
- Label: Eagle Rock Entertainment
- Director: David Mallet
- Producer: Jon Small

Janet Jackson chronology
Design of a Decade 1986-1996 (1995)	The Velvet Rope Tour: Live In Concert (1999)	All for You (DVD Edition) (2001)

The Velvet Rope: Live in Concert is a live video album by American singer Janet Jackson. It was released on March 9, 1999, by Eagle Rock Entertainment.

== Background and release ==
Recorded on October 11, 1998, at Madison Square Garden in New York City as part of The Velvet Rope Tour, the concert was broadcast live on HBO in the United States, and reached an audience of 15 million viewers in the US alone. The concert would also be broadcast on the cable channel's international networks at later dates.

Q-Tip makes a special appearance during the performance of "Got 'til It's Gone". During the performance of "Rope Burn", Jackson picks an unsuspecting member of the audience onto stage and teases them with her performance which included a lap dance. Due to censorship laws, "Rope Burn" and "Any Time, Any Place" were left out of the release in Hong Kong, where the video was issued as a 17 track double VCD.

The full performance was later on released on DVD, LaserDisc and video cassette the same year, and has been certified Platinum by the RIAA It was nominated for 4 Emmy Awards, including "Outstanding Choreography","Outstanding Lighting Direction", "Outstanding Music Direction" and "Outstanding Technical Direction/Camera/Video for a Special". It won the Primetime Emmy Award for "Outstanding Technical Direction/Camera/Video for a Special" in 1999. The video was also nominated for "Outstanding Performance in a Variety Series/Special" and "Outstanding Variety Series/Special" at the 1999 NAACP Image Awards.

The Velvet Rope: Live in Concert was re-released as an individual DVD in 2001, 2004 and 2006 and was repackaged with Live in Hawaii and re-released as a double disc set in the US and Europe on November 14, 2004, and again in Europe with a different cover in 2005.

== Track listing ==
No.	Title	Writer(s)	Length
1.	"Program Start; Velvet Rope"	Janet Jackson; James Harris III; Terry Lewis; René Elizondo Jr.; Malcolm McLaren; Trevor Horn; Mike Oldfield
2.	"If"	Jackson; Lewis; Harris
3.	"You"	Jackson; Harris; Lewis; Elizondo; Harold Brown; Sylvester Allen; Morris Dickerson; Howard Scott; Leroy Jordan; Lee Oskar; Charles Miller
4.	"Let's Wait Awhile"/"Again"	Jackson; Harris; Lewis; Melanie Andrews / Jackson; Harris; Lewis
5.	"Control"/"The Pleasure Principle"/"What Have You Done for Me Lately"/"Nasty" (Control medley)	Jackson; Lewis; Harris / Monte Moir / Jackson; Lewis; Harris / Jackson; Lewis; Harris
6.	"Throb"	Jackson; Lewis; Harris
7.	"Escapade"/"When I Think of You"/"Miss You Much"/"Runaway"/"Love Will Never Do (Without You)" (Escapade medley)	Jackson; Lewis; Harris / Jackson; Lewis; Harris / Lewis; Harris / Jackson; Lewis; Harris / Lewis; Harris
8.	"Alright"	Jackson; Lewis; Harris
9.	"I Get Lonely"	Jackson; Lewis; Harris; Elizondo
10.	"Any Time, Any Place"	Jackson; Lewis; Harris
11.	"Rope Burn"	Jackson; Lewis; Harris; Elizondo
12.	"Black Cat"	Jackson
13.	"What About"	Jackson; Lewis; Harris; Elizondo
14.	"Rhythm Nation"	Jackson; Lewis; Harris
15.	"Special"	Jackson; Lewis; Harris; Elizondo
16.	"That's the Way Love Goes"	Jackson; Harris; Lewis; Fred Wesley; Charles Bobbit; John Starks; James Brown
17.	"Got 'til It's Gone"	Jackson; Lewis; Harris; Elizondo; Roberta Mitchell; Kamaal Ibn Fareed
18.	"Go Deep"	Jackson; Lewis; Harris; Elizondo
19.	"Together Again / End Credits"	Jackson; Lewis; Harris; Elizondo

Special Features
No.	Title	Length
1.	"Filmography"
2.	"Discography"

== Certifications ==
Region	Certification	Certified units/sales
Australia (ARIA)	Platinum	15,000^{^}
United States (RIAA)	Platinum	100,000^{^}
^{^} Shipments figures based on certification alone.

== Release history ==
The Velvet Rope Tour: Live in Concert

Region	Date	Label
United States	October 11, 1998	Eagle Rock Entertainment
International	March 9, 1999	Image Entertainment
United Kingdom and Europe	August 28, 2000	Ilc Entertainment
International	November 26, 2001	Eagle Rock Entertainment
United States	February 24, 2004	Eagle Vision USA
International	June 12, 2006	Eagle Rock Entertainment

Live in Hawaii/The Velvet Rope Tour

Region	Date	Label
Europe	September 6, 2004	Eagle Rock Entertainment
United States	November 16, 2004	Eagle Rock Entertainment
