= APLA =

APLA is a four-letter acronym that may refer to:

- Azanian People's Liberation Army, the military wing of the Pan Africanist Congress (PAC) in South Africa
- AIDS Project Los Angeles, a Los Angeles–based nonprofit organization
- Anti-phospholipid antibody syndrome, an autoimmune condition that may be seen in systemic lupus erythematosus
