= The Velvet Rope =

Studio album by Janet Jackson
- Released: October 7, 1997
- Recorded: January–July 1997
- Studios: Flyte Tyme (Edina, Minnesota); The Hit Factory (New York City); Record Plant (Los Angeles)
- Genres: R&B; pop
- Length: 75:32
- Label: Virgin
- Producers: Janet Jackson; Jimmy Jam and Terry Lewis

Janet Jackson chronology
Design of a Decade: 1986–1996 (1995)	The Velvet Rope (1997)	All for You (2001)

Singles from The Velvet Rope
- 1. "Got 'til It's Gone" Released: September 22, 1997; 2. "Together Again" Released: December 1, 1997; 3. "I Get Lonely" Released: February 24, 1998; 4. "Every Time" Released: March 25, 1998; 5. "Go Deep" Released: June 15, 1998; 6. "You" Released: September 28, 1998

The Velvet Rope is the sixth studio album by American singer Janet Jackson. It was released on October 7, 1997, through Virgin Records. Prior to its release, Jackson renegotiated her contract with Virgin for US$80 million, marking this as the largest recording contract in history at that time.

Upon experiencing an emotional breakdown, Jackson began facing a long-term case of depression. She developed her new record as a concept album, using introspection as its theme. Its title is a metaphor for emotional boundaries as well as an allusion to an individual's need to feel special. Its lyrics address subject matter such as depression, self-worth, social networking, and domestic violence. It also encompasses themes of sexuality, including BDSM, sexual orientation, and same-sex relationships. Due to its sexually explicit content, the album reinforced Jackson's public image as a sex symbol and as one of the most erotic vocalists of the 1990s. Its incorporation of social issues regarding sexual orientation and combating homophobia also established her reputation as a gay icon, for which she received the GLAAD Media Award for Outstanding Music.

The record was written and produced by Jackson, alongside Jimmy Jam and Terry Lewis and co-written by René Elizondo Jr., her then-husband. The songs on the album also include British violinist Vanessa-Mae and American rapper Q-Tip as featured artists, along with samples from Canadian singer-songwriter Joni Mitchell's "Big Yellow Taxi". Its composition fuses various genres, including R&B, pop, trip hop, folk, jazz, rock, and techno music.

The Velvet Rope became Jackson's fourth consecutive album to top the US Billboard 200. It also reached the top of the charts in Denmark and the top five in major markets such as Australia, Canada, France, and Germany. The album was certified triple platinum by the Recording Industry Association of America (RIAA) and has sold an estimated eight million copies worldwide. Of the six singles released from the project, "Got 'til It's Gone" won the 1998 Grammy Award for Best Music Video, "Together Again" became an international number-one hit, and "I Get Lonely" became Jackson's 18th consecutive top-ten single on the US Billboard Hot 100, making her the only female artist in history to achieve that feat. The Velvet Rope Tour, in support of the album, drew critical acclaim for its theatricality, as well as controversy for its depictions of domestic violence and bondage.

== Background ==
Jackson's first compilation album, Design of a Decade: 1986–1996, was released in 1995. It peaked at number three on the US Billboard 200. The lead single, "Runaway", became the first song by a female artist to debut within the top ten of the Hot 100, reaching number three. Design of a Decade 1986–1996 was certified double platinum by the RIAA and sold ten million copies worldwide. The release marked the fulfillment of Jackson's contractual obligations to Virgin Records. As a result, she became subject to an industry bidding war between various parties, including Virgin, Bertelsmann, DreamWorks, Sony Music, Time Warner, and The Walt Disney Company, who attempted to sign her jointly with PolyGram. She ultimately renewed her contract with Virgin for $80 million—the largest recording contract in history at that time and a breakthrough she achieved for the second time in her career. The contract surpassed the recording industry's then-unparalleled $60 million contracts earned by Michael Jackson and Madonna.

== Writing and development ==
"I had my ways of hiding my pain. Laughing when there was nothing to laugh at. Smiling when there wasn't anything to smile about. That was just my way of getting through life. Pretending like everything was okay. I guess I did it so well that I really began to believe it. I fooled myself. Using my escapisms was my thing to not feel my pain—whatever would numb the pain."

— Janet on the repression of various traumas throughout her adolescence.

During her Janet World Tour, Jackson experienced an emotional breakdown, stemming from self-hatred, childhood humiliation, self-harm, and distorted body image. She stated, "I was very, very sad. Very down. I couldn't get up sometimes. There were times when I felt very hopeless and helpless, and I felt like walls were kind of closing in on me...like you can't escape". She questioned her career path, feeling pressured by the demands of the entertainment industry, saying, "People look at you differently, as if you're not human." Abbie Kearse of MTV responded, "You're creating a person who might not really be you, but you've created this fantasy woman, so when it's time to get back to business, it's like 'I've got to go back to that world'". Jackson expressed concern for how she could portray an object of fantasy, feeling as if she could no longer fulfill her own desires.

In self-analysis, Jackson uncovered vital details regarding her past, saying, "Certain things may happen, and you just dismiss them instead of stopping and saying, "Why am I feeling this way? Why am I acting out in this way?" She had suppressed various traumas throughout her adolescence and early adulthood, using evasion tactics to prevent thoughts from surfacing. She also recalled feeling unaccepted and ostracized for her skin color. She was persistently haunted by a memory of a school teacher intensely scolding her, causing her classmates to erupt in laughter. "Oh, God, it sounds so stupid. But being a kid you're just so frightened... I never talked about it, so it stayed with me all those years. I felt not deserving, not good enough... that's still the way I feel about myself sometimes", she declared. As a child, she managed discomfort by speaking to her animals, later turning to overeating as an anesthetic, causing fluctuations in weight. Jackson said, "I began to realize that whenever something really painful was going on, I would eat, and that's how I would run away from it. But I would just be creating another problem in another area instead of just dealing with that pain".

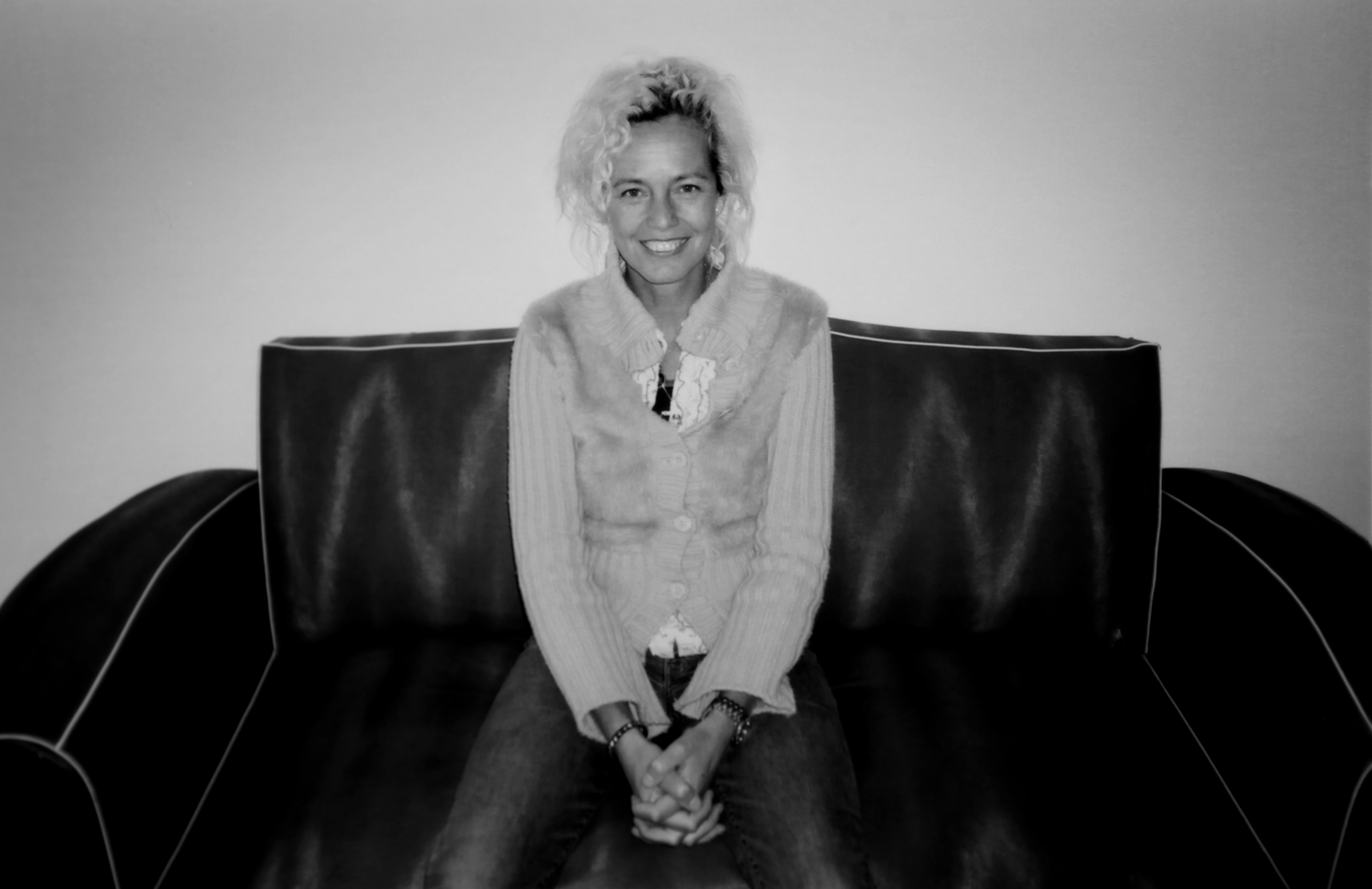
Photographer Ellen von Unwerth (pictured) attempted to capture Jackson's emotional pain within the album's imagery.

Jackson developed body dysmorphia as a response to ridicule, stating, "I'd look in the mirror and hate myself. I'd sit and cry. It was so hard for me to look at myself and find something that I liked. Not just physically, but something that was good in me". She also inflicted self-harm, banging her head against the wall when feeling unattractive. She traced her fragility to her abusive marriage to recording artist James DeBarge when she was 16 years old. Jackson recalled, "It all has to do with very low self esteem. Especially going into a relationship like that very young... someone telling you things like, 'no one is ever going to want you again, you should be happy here with me.'" Attempting to alter his behavior and drug addiction, she explained, "I learned the hard way that you can't change a person." Recalling her divorce, she revealed, "There came a point when I finally said, 'You know what? I just don't care what happens.' I had to do what I wanted to but had been too afraid to. And at that point I didn't care if I got my brains beat out. I just went ahead and did it. And I got my ass kicked for it. But I'm happy that I did it, or I don't think I would be here today".

Her self-hatred accelerated into raging cycles of bulimia and anorexia, repressing the issue until questioned. Jackson said, "people say to me: 'Okay, you've got to start eating more. You're too thin.' But when you look in the mirror, you see something totally different." She continued, "I had swung so far in one direction, I never thought I could swing so far in the other. You're losing weight and getting smaller, and I'd still say to myself I could afford to lose a little more". However, she refused professional guidance, reluctant to examination. She briefly saw a psychologist before an encounter with a spiritual guru, who aided her emotional recovery. Jackson recounted, "we went to this very spiritual place in the desert... That's where I met him, this cowboy. He's in his fifties, and he's full of wisdom. He's an older man who has experienced a great deal, and he used to be in the music industry, on a smaller scale. He even understood that side of my life". She also began using coffee enemas to remove "sad cells", leading to media scrutiny. The trauma lead to a brief duration of sexual questioning, saying "Am I curious? I think every girl has wondered". Jackson culminated the experiences into the album's subject matter, recording over two years.

== Recording ==
The album was produced by Jackson with Jimmy Jam and Terry Lewis. Its initial stages began following her Janet World Tour, recording intermittently over two years. The process stalled due to various issues facing Jackson, including depression, body dysmorphia, anorexia, and self-hatred. As a result, Jackson spontaneously canceled sessions, appearing constantly troubled, as Jam commented, "That was a tough album to make for her. There were times when she would not show up at the studio for five or six days in a row".

She returned to the studio in January 1997, embarking on a six-and-a-half month recording process. Its production was adjusted towards Jackson's lyrics and vocal suggestions, using an altered technique from prior sessions. Attempting to push pop music in an alternate direction, the record was described as "a triumph of the spirit, a declaration of joy and healing that comes from examining the past while energizing the present, [...] exploring the mysteries of sexuality even as it addresses the problems of prejudice". Explaining the concept and the writing of The Velvet Rope, she stated:

"Singing these songs has meant digging up pain that I buried a long time ago. It's been hard and sometimes confusing, but I've had to do it. I've been burying pain my whole life. It's like kicking dirt under the carpet. At some point there's so much dirt you start to choke. Well, I've been choking. My therapy came in writing these songs. Then I had to find the courage to sing them or else suffer the consequences — a permanent case of the blues."

== Music and lyrics ==
The Velvet Rope consists of sixteen songs and seven interludes; experimenting with various genres and darker themes. The album fused pop and R&B with various genres, including jazz, folk music, and techno. Jackson stated:

"We've all driven by premieres or nightclubs, and seen the rope separating those who can enter and those who can't. Well, there's also a velvet rope we have inside us, keeping others from knowing our feelings. In The Velvet Rope, I'm trying to expose and explore those feelings. I'm inviting you inside my velvet rope. I have a need to feel special, and so do you. We share a burning need to belong. During my life, I've been on both sides of the rope. At times, especially during my childhood, I felt left out and alone. At times I felt misunderstood. Times when I ran into the backyard to confide in our dogs. Through them, I felt like I was talking to God. But no human heard those feelings expressed. They stay buried in my past. But the truth has to come out, and, for me, the truth takes the form of a song."

Jackson described the release as her most personal work, developed throughout her entire lifetime. She explained, "I never looked deeply at the pain from my past, never tried to understand that pain and work it through. It was a journey I had avoided. But one I now had to face." Robert Hilburn added, "Jackson found a universal symbol to use in exploring issues of insecurity and self-worth. At some point, everyone is on the wrong side of the velvet rope, excluded because of race, social status, age or some other division." Jackson regarded commercial success as a secondary consideration, commenting, "I needed to express who I was and what I'd learned. I found out who I really was... If that can inspire people who hear this album to do the same, I'd rather have that than the biggest selling album in the world."

== Themes ==
"Free Xone"
"Free Xone" incorporates funk and electronic music as Jackson protests homophobia, saying, "I contrast sexual prejudice with the freedom of being who you are."

"What About"
Jackson confronts domestic violence over a hard rock instrumental, stating "if we're going to get on with our lives, the pain has to [be] faced. And the result can be explosive anger."

The album gained media attention for its explicit themes and exploration of homosexuality, suggested as a "queer-studies thesis." Singapore law officials banned the album due to its lyrics supporting homosexuality. "Free Xone" speaks of gay, lesbian and bisexual pairings, as Jackson protests discrimination. "Together Again" recalls a departed friend lost to AIDS. Her cover of Rod Stewart's "Tonight's the Night" suggests losing her virginity to another woman, also alluding to bisexuality. Media attention led Stewart to announce "that's an original song by Janet Jackson" when performed in concerts. In response to criticism, Jackson said, "I have a lot of gay friends, men and women, and that's why I did it. I knew people would say I was gay, and I didn't care." She also stated, "I caught a lot of hell for that... religious groups have been upset with me for certain songs on the album, but it's not going to stop me from writing what I feel inside." Media reports of Jackson involved in intimate relationships with dancers Tina Landon and Shawnette Heard surfaced following its release, although denied.

The album's "most startling" song was considered "What About", in which Jackson violently confronts domestic abuse. Jackson stated, "I think it's important to let others know that certain things that you may have experienced in your life, and that they're not alone, and that you understand what they're going through, and that they can make it through." Joel Lyans included it among "The New Soundtrack of Social Consciousness", writing, "Here, Janet does what she does best: demonstrates a coy and shy demeanor before ripping into a confident and empowered voice for those who are afraid to speak up and speak out about a situation that plagues millions of women." Several media reports related its theme with President Bill Clinton's infidelity to Hillary Clinton with Monica Lewinsky. Jackson clarified it to be about her own experience, saying, "President Clinton? People have said that to me. They say 'this is his song'," comparing the situation with her song "This Time" inaccurately related to O. J. Simpson and Nicole Brown Simpson due to its subject matter.

Jackson's progression into advanced erotic content was criticized, though she defended her material. J. D. Considine praised Jackson's focus on intercourse "as if it were simply a fact of life", noting her concern with "the emotional component of sex, rather than the act itself."

== Songs ==
"Empty"
"Empty" speaks of anonymous relationships via social networking. Jackson said, "I think about people whose only connection to other people is through a computer. I wonder what kind of reality that creates, and what kind of romantic frustrations it produces."

In "Twisted Elegance", Jackson speaks over piano and white noise. Its composition addressed the "emotional and sexual politics of relationships", restraints of depression, self-esteem, domestic violence, homosexuality, AIDS, and sadomasochism. It transitions into the title track, progressing from rapid electronica into a mid-tempo techno structure. It incorporates The Exorcist theme "Tubular Bells" as Jackson explains "a velvet rope we have inside us, keeping others from knowing our feelings", closing with a violin solo by Vanessa-Mae. "You" incorporates "deep-down funk" and trip hop, as Jackson distorts her voice in a low range during a challenge of self-scrutiny. "Got 'til It's Gone" is an R&B, alternative pop and trip hop song, featuring rapper Q-Tip, and samples from folk singer Joni Mitchell's "Big Yellow Taxi" . Jackson speaks of vulnerability and regret in a "depressive sobriety". Interlude "Speakerphone" consists of Jackson beginning to masturbate before a phone conversation with ex-sister-in-law Lisa Marie Presley, who was still romantically involved with Jackson's brother Michael Jackson at the time despite the two being divorced. "My Need" is a mid-tempo hip-hop song tackling self-obsession and unbridled lust. Interlude "Fasten Your Seatbelts" portrays Jackson and her dancers mimicking Bette Davis in What Ever Happened to Baby Jane? and All About Eve. "Go Deep" combines dance-pop and G-funk, performed in a "girlish breathiness".

"Free Xone" incorporates "slamming funk" with drum and bass, derived from "scratching, sampling, honey rapping, break beats and electronic accents." Jackson described it "about homophobia and the pain it causes." "Together Again" is an uptempo house and dance-pop song; considered a "modern post-disco meditation on the beauty of dance and eternal grace of romantic bonding." Interlude "Online" features Jackson typing before a dial-up internet connection is heard. "Empty" is an electronic ballad incorporating trip hop, propelled by a "jittery, mellowed-out jungly beat". Its lyrics speak of the void felt through social network relationships, empathizing with those searching for acceptance via the internet. "What About" confronts Jackson's experiences with domestic violence. Over flamenco guitars, she recalls a former companion proposing before violently transitioning into hard rock during the chorus. "Every Time" is a piano ballad documenting Jackson's fear of love, examining an apprehensive side of romance.

"Tonight's the Night" alludes to sexual anticipation, suggesting a lesbian encounter and potential threesome during its finale. Jackson stated, "The record company tried to talk me out of it because it's directed toward a girl. I love the song the way it is, and it's reality for a lot of people." "I Get Lonely" evokes lush sensuality as Jackson speaks of abandonment over a sparse backing. "Rope Burn" evokes bondage and sadomasochism, as Jackson requests to be tied down and pleasured with candle wax. It was declared "the first R&B trip-hop ballad, retro-fitted with a lazy, jazzy beat and a spare, slap bass-heavy backing track." Jackson regarded it as a "soft instrument of extended pleasure", saying, "The expression of sexual fantasies can be beautiful if there's trust, love and understanding." "Anything" is a ballad invoking "feverish dimensions" of satisfaction.

In piano ballad "Special", Jackson speaks to her inner child, spreading the message that "pain is not permanent", but rather, transformed. Jackson said, "Getting back to that child, and giving the child what the child may have missed—the reassurance of a nourishing and accepting a love, a love that says you're special—is hard work. It can be scary but, like the song says, we have to deal with the past to live completely—and freely—in the present." "Can't Be Stopped" speaks of youth victimization, bigotry, and racial unity, "directed at young people who are discouraged or discriminated against... I want them to know that their inner-strength is stronger than the forces against them."

== Packaging and title ==
The Velvet Rope was titled as a metaphor for the emotional barricade preventing others from revealing their innermost thoughts; in comparison to the velvet rope used at film premieres and award shows, prohibiting access from spectators. It also served as a metaphor for the barriers separating different classes of society. It was based on various events throughout her adolescence and early adulthood, resurfacing after attempted escapism.

The album's artwork was photographed by Ellen von Unwerth, with additional photos by Mario Testino. The cover depicts Jackson lowering her head amidst a crimson backdrop, symbolizing remorse. "Janet" is faintly embossed in a pixelated block formation. Jackson stated, "The shot we used on the cover shows me just looking down, and that's what the album was about, looking inward". MTV News regarded the artwork as iconic and an influence on various artists. Its internal artwork depicts Jackson's piercings and tattoos, also displaying her hands tied in bondage and latex attire, exhibiting fetishism. A particular photo of Jackson wearing a latex ensemble with her nipple piercing peering through an opening gained notoriety for its explicit nature. The photo also shows Jackson pricking her body with an ice pick.

Upon its release, Jackson unveiled an edgier image, flaunting hennaed red hair and tattoos on her neck, wrist, foot, back, and lower thigh; also acquiring nipple, septum, and labia piercings. The transition was considered to risk alienation, though she was commended as "a master at surprising and shocking her public". Jackson used a variation of the Akan Sankofa symbol throughout its artwork and imagery; representing the motif "You cannot move into the future until you learn from your past". She tattooed the symbol onto her wrist. Jackson's tattoo artist later stated, "I have a lot of people who fly in from all over the world to get something that has to do with Janet's sacred tattoos... She's an inspiration to a lot of people, and when they see something on Janet that helps her be strong, they want that strength as well".

== Release and promotion ==
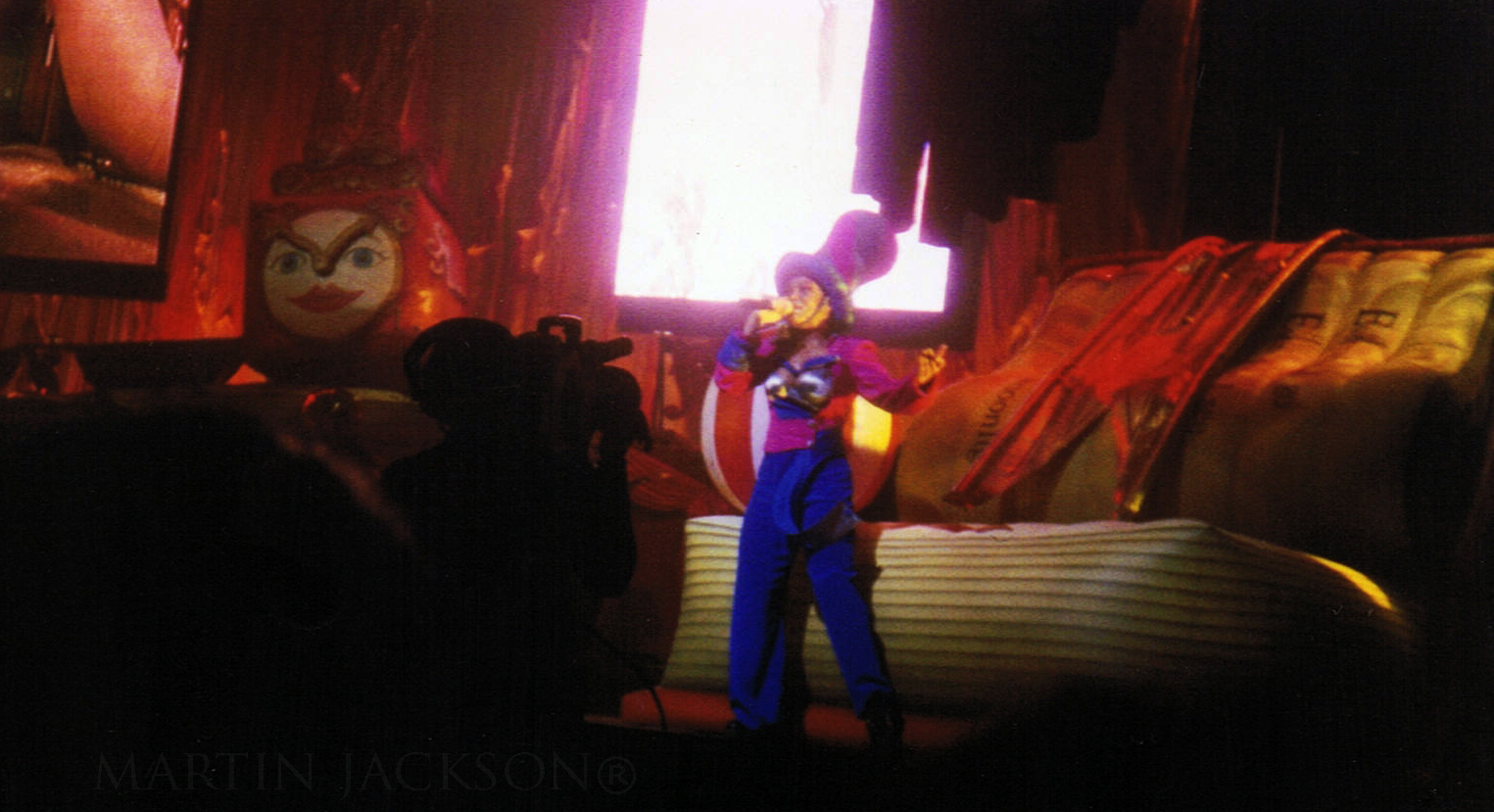
Jackson performing during the Velvet Rope Tour

Prior to the album's release, Billboard reported that a large-scale marketing campaign had been organized to promote the album. Nancy Berry, then-executive vice president of Virgin Music Group Worldwide, stated that promotion for The Velvet Rope's release were the company's largest until then, and although the record company had planned to bring Jackson's new album to the highest number of consumers, they did not want the campaign to be too intrusive. To handle the publishing rights to the music of Janet Jackson, company Black Doll was founded. The music industry scene had changed since Jackson's last release, with hip-hop-flavored R&B taking over mainstream music. However, Virgin executives were still confident that lead single "Got 'til It's Gone" would be successful. The recording company opted for a more urban promotion, using billboards and spaces in subways, as well as TV commercials.

The music video for "Got 'til It's Gone" premiered during the opening of the MTV Video Music Awards on September 4, 1997, where Jackson presented an award to Mark Romanek. The day before, an album listening party was held in New York City at the Chrysler Building's Art Deco Cloud Room, reopened after sixty-five years for the event. Entertainers in attendance included Marilyn Manson, Beck, Billy Corgan, Sheryl Crow, Meredith Brooks, Diddy, Naomi Campbell, Michael Douglas and Lisa Marie Presley. On September 9, a release party for the album was set up at Sony Pictures Studios in Culver City, California. In mid-September, Jackson went to Europe to promote the album. She performed "Got 'til It's Gone" on BBC One's Top of the Pops show and on Graines de Star in France. Upon her return to the United States to release the album, she was interviewed on The Oprah Winfrey Show, performing "Got 'til It's Gone" and "Together Again".

One of the new ways to promote the album was the use of the Internet. In a collaboration with MTV, an online chat with the singer was set up. The event happened through MTV Live on October 6, 1997, the day before the album's release. A day later, she signed copies at an album signing held at the Virgin Megastore in New York City. Jackson also promoted the album in Oceania and Asia, performing on Hey Hey It's Saturday in Australia and Hey! Hey! Hey! Music Champ in Japan. Upon returning to her promotional tour in Europe, she performed "Got 'til It's Gone" on French TV programs Les Années Tubes, Hit Machine along with "Together Again", and Spanish television on TV show Música Sí. while also singing on Spanish TV on the shows Música Sí and Turrón y... cuenta nueva. In January, Jackson opened the American Music Awards, performing the DJ Premier remix of "Together Again". She performed the following single "I Get Lonely" at the Soul Train Awards, with an acoustic rendition performed on the Rosie O'Donnell Show. Jackson performed a controversial rendition of "What About" at the VH1 Fashion Awards, displaying vignettes of domestic violence. Jackson also gave numerous interviews to several publications, including People, Vibe, Vogue, Ebony and Rolling Stone.

On October 7, 2022, exactly 25 years after the release of the album, a deluxe version was released digitally, adding the songs "Accept Me" (B-side of "You" and "Every Time" singles) and "God's Stepchild" (Japanese bonus track), as well as finally having the song "Can't Be Stopped" as its own stand-alone track instead of being hidden. It also comes with a second "component" including 13 remixes.

=== Tour ===
"Janet's concerts are the pop equivalent of a summer blockbuster movie, with all the explosions, special effects, ersatz sentimentality, gratuitous cleavage and emphasis on spectacle over coherence that the term implies."

— Nicholas Barber of The Independent

Jackson embarked on The Velvet Rope Tour, visiting Europe, North America, Japan, New Zealand, Africa, and Australia. It used an autobiographical theme derived from elements of Broadway theater. She stated, "To me, being onstage is about entertaining. I know there are people who just walk onstage and give you a show by just doing their music, but I always wanted something extra". She added, "I knew what I wanted everyone to look like, especially for the opening number. I knew what I wanted everyone to wear. I visualized the whole thing". Among the first tours to use LED technology, Mark Fisher stated, "She wanted to have a book opening and herself come out of it. So I finessed that book into the video screen".

Jackson's showmanship was commended by critics, who also praised the show's theatrics and pyrotechnics. Robert Hilburn regarded it to help Jackson "finally get the credit she deserves as an artist", with the show also called "the must-see concert of the year". The tour was controversial for its sexuality and portrayal of domestic violence, most notably within performances of "Rope Burn" and "What About". Its advertisements, depicting Jackson in a transparent outfit with her nipple piercing and bikini partially visible, also drew media attention. Several publications refused to publish the ad, while billboards of the image caused traffic accidents in Europe. The tour's HBO broadcast received over 15 million viewers, surpassing the ratings of all four major networks. It won an Emmy Award for "Outstanding Technical Direction/Camera/Video for a Special". The final date at Hawaii's Aloha Stadium became the most attended concert in the venue's history. The tour was reported to receive a worldwide attendance of ten million in total. Jackson donated a portion of the tour's sales to America's Promise, an organization founded by Colin Powell to assist disenfranchised youth.

== Singles ==
"Got 'til It's Gone" peaked at number 36 on Hot 100 Airplay, twelve on Rhythmic Top 40 and three on Hot R&B/Hip-Hop Airplay. It was ineligible to chart on the Billboard Hot 100 due to not having a commercial single released. Internationally, it reached the top five in Denmark and New Zealand; top ten in Australia, Netherlands, Sweden, and United Kingdom and top twenty in various countries. "Together Again" reached number one on the Billboard Hot 100, spending a record of 46 weeks on the chart. It was certified platinum by the RIAA. It reached the top two within Belgium, Netherlands, Canada, France, Germany, and Switzerland, and top five in Australia, Denmark, New Zealand, and United Kingdom. "Together Again" is among the biggest selling global singles in history and her highest selling single to date, exceeding six million copies.

"I Get Lonely" reached number three on the Billboard Hot 100, number one on Hot Dance Single Sales and Hot R&B/Hip-Hop Singles & Tracks, five in the United Kingdom, and fourteen on the European Hot 100. It set a record as her eighteenth consecutive top ten hit on the Hot 100, surpassed only by Elvis Presley and The Beatles. "Every Time" was released in Japan on March 25, 1998, and was issued worldwide later in the year; it reached the top forty within the Netherlands and New Zealand. "Go Deep" was ineligible to chart on the Billboard Hot 100, though peaked at number twelve on Pop Songs, eight on Rhythmic Top 40, and number one on Hot Dance Club Play. The success of collaborations "Luv Me, Luv Me" and "What's It Gonna Be?!" each affected the latter two singles' performances. "You" was a promotional single in the United Kingdom, being ineligible to chart. "What About" was initially planned for release, while an edit of the title track received limited test airplay. In April 2012, "Rope Burn" charted on Korea's Gaon Digital Chart.

== Critical reception ==
Professional ratings
Review scores
Source	Rating
Chicago Tribune	2.5/4 stars
Entertainment Weekly	A
The Guardian	3.5/5 stars
Los Angeles Times	4/4 stars
Pitchfork	9.4/10
Rolling Stone	3.5/5 stars
The Rolling Stone Album Guide	4/5 stars
Slant Magazine	4.5/5 stars
USA Today	4/4 stars
The Village Voice	A−

Upon release, The Velvet Rope received a range of responses from music critics. While many praised it as a bold reinvention of Jackson’s artistry, others criticized it for being too much of a departure from her previous work. Although critics agreed on the diversity of the album’s sound, its elaborate conceptual themes were frequently questioned.

In a contemporary review for The New York Times, critic Jon Pareles declared it "her most daring, elaborate and accomplished album", observing songs to "transform themselves as they go, leaping from sharply etched cross-rhythms to lush choruses." Greg Kot from the Chicago Tribune regarded it a "soundtrack to a therapy session", while the Los Angeles Times commended its content; addressing "the social, emotional and sexual politics of relationships, peppering the wistful, spirited pop melodies and sinuous R&B rhythms with compelling jazz, folk and techno nuances." Elysa Gardner added, "provocative gestures ultimately blend in with the album's larger agenda, which is to encourage more open-minded, free-spirited relationships of all kinds... with hooks this strong and grooves this delicious, Jackson's authority should be of question to no one." MTV News declared it an "interesting step in a new direction" and "long, sometimes strange trip into Jackson's sensual world". Slant Magazine called it "a richly dark masterwork", illustrating "there is nothing sexier than emotional nakedness". Robert Christgau noted Jackson's vocal cadence, retaining "her magical ability to feign delight". Keith Harris stated it "plumbed introspective depths with intriguing results".

In his review for The Village Voice, Vince Aletti praised its "unusu-ally busy, electronica- spiked soundscape", revealing "the process of psychic reconstruction". Aletti added, "she combines a pure pop sensibility with ambition, vulnerability, freakishness, and extraordinary savvy. She's--in her inadequate word--special". However, Jackson's "isolating control" was regarded as its "more bracing" material. Entertainment Weekly observed its subject matter of "computer liaisons to bondage and bisexuality", finding the most pervasive theme to be love. Roger Catlin of The Courant noted its aura "washes away her sometimes strident political messages or her attempt to shock with sexuality", adding, "the album shimmers with sensuality, openness and thirst for new adventures, musically and otherwise." Len Righi of The Morning Call called it "compelling, as she tackled almost every imaginable social ill and personal problem while still leaving room for freakiness and fun." Jane Dark of City Pages stated it "eludes genre-fication", leaving Jackson "in a genre of her own". Alluded to "an eroticon of cybersex, queer positivity, and mild bondage", Dark regarded its production "a sexy motherfucker... abstractly electro tones come and go with sharp attack and sharper decay, appearing out of--and vanishing into--aggressively blank spaces". Jackson's "flawed sweetness" was also acclaimed; concluding, "She's the principle that organizes the noise, and the particle around which songs become pearlescent". USA Today praised her usage of "edgier beats and rawer emotions".

The length of The Velvet Rope drew criticism from certain music critics. In a less enthusiastic mixed review, AllMusic observed a "hardened, sexually experimental Janet"; however, its writer claimed that "the best moments sink into the murk", and that "there are good moments on The Velvet Rope, but at its running time [...] it's hard to work up the patience to find them". In a retrospective review, BBC Music stated that "[i]t's far too long. It does feel like you've given over a considerable chunk of your life to it by its end, an unfortunate by-product of the CD era with its overriding desire to fill up every last second of each disc". However, a positive review of the record was given on the whole, with its author calling it "[m]ature and experimental... Possibly the great lost 90s trip hop album".

In October 2022, Pitchfork reviewed the deluxe edition of the album with a rating of 9.4 out of 10.

=== Accolades ===
Jackson was awarded at the American Music Awards and nominated for "Top Pop Artist" at the Billboard Awards, with "I Get Lonely" receiving a Grammy Award nomination and "Together Again" nominated at the MTV Video Music Awards. Internationally, Jackson was nominated for "Best International Female" at the BRIT Awards, winning "Best Foreign Artist" and "Best Foreign Album" at the Danish Music Awards, "Best International Female" at the Norwegian Hit-Awards, "Best Female" at the MTV Europe Music Awards, and "Best International Female" for three consecutive years at the TMF Awards. Jackson was awarded the Lifetime Achievement Award for Outstanding Contributions to Pop Music by Prince Albert at the World Music Awards. She was also presented the Lena Horne Lifetime Achievement Award by Maya Angelou at the Lady Soul Train Awards. APLA awarded Jackson for her involvement in AIDS organizations, also receiving a GLAAD Award for "Outstanding Music". VH1 ranked her among "Hollywood's 16 Hottest Celesbians" due to the album's homoerotic content. The Velvet Rope was later included among Rolling Stone's "500 Greatest Albums of All Time".

List of accolades for The Velvet Rope

Award	Nominated work	Result
AIDS Project Los Angeles	Commitment to Life Award	Won
American Music Awards	Favorite R&B Female Artist	Won
Billboard Awards	Top Hot 100 Singles Artist, Female	Nominated
Billboard Awards	Top Pop Artists	Nominated
Billboard Awards	Top Billboard 200 Album Artists	Nominated
Billboard Awards	Top Dance/Club Artist of the Year	Nominated
Billboard Awards	Top R&B Artist, Female	Won
Billboard Awards	Top Hot R&B Airplay Single – "I Get Lonely"	Nominated
Blockbuster Awards	Favorite Female R&B Artist	Won
Blockbuster Awards	Favorite Female Artist	Nominated
BMI Pop Awards	Most Played Song – "Together Again"	Won
BMI Pop Awards	Most Played Song – "I Get Lonely"	Won
BRIT Awards	Best International Female	Nominated
Channel V Awards	Best International Female Artist	Won
Complex	100 Best Albums Streaming on Spotify – #34 (2012)	—N/a
Danish Music Awards	Best Foreign Album	Won
Danish Music Awards	Best Foreign Artist	Won
Danish Music Awards	Best Foreign Single – "Got 'til It's Gone"	Nominated
ECHO Awards	Best Female Artist	Nominated
GLAAD Awards	Outstanding Music: The Velvet Rope	Won
Grammy Awards	Best Music Video, Short Form – "Got 'til It's Gone"	Won
Grammy Awards	Best R&B Vocal Performance, Female – "I Get Lonely"	Nominated
Los Angeles Times	Highest Grossing Musicians of 1998 – #10	—N/a
Norwegian Hit-Awards	Best International Female Artist	Won
Lady Soul Train Awards	Best Album of the Year	Nominated
Lady Soul Train Awards	Lena Horne Lifetime Achievement Award	Won
Lady Soul Train Awards	Best Single, Solo – "I Get Lonely"	Nominated
Lady Soul Train Awards	Best Music Video – "I Get Lonely"	Nominated
MTV Europe Music Awards	Best Female	Nominated
MTV Online Awards	Best Album of the Year	Won
MTV Video Music Awards	Best Dance Video – "Together Again"	Nominated
MVPA Awards	Video of the Year – "Got 'til It's Gone"	Nominated
MVPA Awards	Pop Music Video of the Year – "Got 'til It's Gone"	Won
MVPA Awards	Best Art Direction – "Got 'til It's Gone"	Won
Pitchfork	The 150 Best Albums of the 1990s	#7
Spelman Alumni Association	Honoree Award	Won
Performance Magazine Awards	Act of the Year	Won
Rolling Stone	500 Greatest Albums of All Time (2003)	#256
Rolling Stone	500 Greatest Albums of All Time (2012)	#259
Rolling Stone	500 Greatest Albums of All Time (2020)	#318
Soul Train Awards	Album of the Year, Female	Nominated
TMF Awards	Best International Female Singer – 1997	Won
TMF Awards	Best International Female Singer – 1998	Won
TMF Awards	Best International Female Singer – 1999	Won
TMF Awards	Best Live Act	Nominated
VH1 Fashion Awards	Most Stylish Music Video – "Got 'til It's Gone"	Won
VH1 Viewer's Choice Awards	Sexiest Music Video of the Year – "I Get Lonely"	Nominated
Vibe	50 Albums Every 20 Something Should Own – #11 (2012)	—N/a
World Music Awards	Lifetime Achievement Award for Outstanding Contributions to Pop Music	Won

== Commercial performance ==
The Velvet Rope debuted at number one on the Billboard 200, selling 202,000 copies in its first week. It fell to number two in its second week. It sold four million copies globally within its first several months of release, and 1.6 million copies in the US in 1998. On November 11, the album was certified gold and platinum by the Recording Industry Association of America (RIAA), denoting 1,000,000 units sold. It was certified double platinum the following year, and triple platinum on January 15, 1999. It sold an additional 420,000 copies through BMG Music Club. According to Nielsen SoundScan, the album has sold 3,229,000 copies domestically as of March 2009.

Internationally, the album charted within the top five of numerous countries, including Australia, France, Norway, Sweden, and at number six in the UK. In Germany the album debuted at number five and charted for 46 weeks. In Japan, it debuted within the top ten, selling 34,910 copies in its first week. In Australia, the album was certified double platinum by the Australian Recording Industry Association (ARIA). It was certified triple platinum in Canada and platinum in Japan, Europe, France, Netherlands, New Zealand, Norway, Switzerland and the United Kingdom; also receiving a gold certification in Belgium, Germany, Denmark, Sweden, and Taiwan. The Velvet Rope has sold an estimated eight million copies worldwide.

== Legacy ==
"Janet's ability to effortlessly present necessary, meaningful messages via classic dance music is legendary. She proved that artists don't have to scream to get a message across. There is a middle ground. Here, she had perfected her mix of provocative, personal, and pertinent."

— Saint Heron on the album's legacy.

Billboard commended it as "her most personal and intimate work to date", confronting "domestic abuse, AIDS, and homophobia with her most sexually explicit songs ever." Jackson stated, "That was a crossroads for me: sharing what I'd been going through personally and how I felt about what was happening in the world." Kyra Phillips of CNN declared it "difficult and very intimate", exploring "Jackson's darker side, her emotional break down and the secret that shocked the world." Regarding its content, Jackson said, "I'm sure it did alienate a lot of people, but that's what I was feeling, and I wanted to write about it, so I did." Jackson later stated:

"Velvet Rope is both the highest and lowest point. On a personal level, it was a low point, because I was going through a depression. That was a difficult time for me. At the same time it was my highest point, because I overcame the depression by talking about the crossroads I was at. There were so many things resurfacing that I'd suppressed: stuff from my childhood, stuff from all over the place. I was crazed trying to figure out where it was all coming from and how to deal with it. I could have made a wrong turn and tried to drink and drug it away. But drinking and drugs never appealed to me. I wanted it to stop. Talking it out and creating such an introspective work as Velvet Rope helped me do that."

Ryam Dombal of Pitchfork considered it a pioneer of "the 'dark' and/or 'mature'" pop album, saying, "the rebel record is now a de rigueur coming-of-age manoeuvre." City Pages called it a "gem" which foresaw "damn near every rhythmic trend of the decade: Timbaland's drum 'n' stutter, quick-stepping house, and walloping slabs of techno." Its innovation was cited as fusing "compelling jazz, folk and techno nuances" with trip hop and contemporary pop. MTV News also noted its "number of stylistic twists you might never associate with such a mainstream diva." In particular, "Empty" was commended for its theme of relationships via social networking, considered a prediction of subsequent technology.

Eve Barlow of NME included it among seven albums considered "Perfect from Start to Finish", stating: "Jackson had already begun pushing the boundaries of sexually explicit pop but it's The Velvet Rope that cemented her as a free, liberal voice for experimentation." Its blend of "new electro" and trip-hop was thought to "meld seamlessly"; its lyrical content also thought to push society's "judgment calls", breaking free from "the American sweetheart of past LPs." Shayne Lee, author of Erotic Revolutionaries: Black Women, Sexuality, and Popular Culture (2010), wrote that the album and its predecessor "brand[ed] her as one of the most sexually stimulating vocalists of the 1990s." Jessica Skolnik of Vice stated, "I am of the Madonna generation, the Janet generation... The Velvet Rope was an absolute milestone and, in my mid-thirties, is increasingly meaningful to me." Telegram & Gazette stated, "Jackson shows once again that she can compete against any of the lightweight, mega-selling pop divas and hang them out to dry." According to the Los Angeles Times, the album became "more eagerly anticipated" than Michael Jackson's output; taking her "once and for all out of the shadow." Sal Cinquemani declared it "Janet's richest work to date", while Brannon Smith heralded it to reveal "her battle with depression, and saw her continue to empower through her pain."

== Influence ==
Nicole Scherzinger cited it as the inspiration for her second album Big Fat Lie. Rihanna's Rated R drew comparisons for its production and "nakedly autobiographical vibe"; the theme of single "Te Amo" also likened to Jackson's "Tonight's the Night". The "burbly electro hooks" and "curled-lip sass" of Rihanna's Talk that Talk was also regarded as "warmed-over Velvet Rope-era Janet Jackson". About.com noted Patrick Stump's Soul Punk to incorporate the album's "musical stylings". The packaging of Usher's 8701 was also thought to recall its imagery. French singer Piu Piu also called it a primary influence.

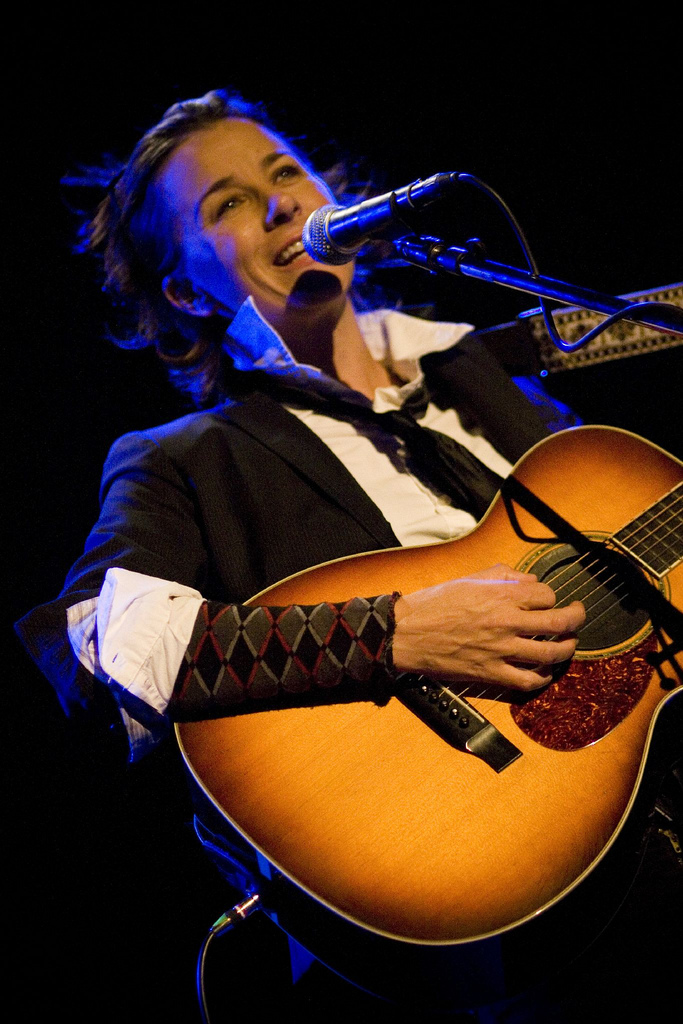
Singer-songwriter Melissa Ferrick was inspired by the record for her song "Drive".

Drew Millard of Vice stated the album "inadvertently predicts most of the cooler trends in contemporary indie music," saying, "Dam-Funk's bedroom-keyb attack? "Go Deep" did it. "Together Again" is basically the song Disclosure has been shooting for this entire time, and Tom Krell would wrestle an alligator with his bare hands to create a song as chillingly beautiful as "Empty". How to Dress Well cites its "schizophrenic diversity" as the inspiration for the album Total Loss, saying, "She set such an example for trusting yourself, and following that intuition wherever it takes you... she made a fucking sprawling masterpiece with a song from every genre, and it works." Merchandise sold at Well's shows feature a quote from interlude "Memory". Indie rock band Wheat used the album as a reference for their second album Hope and Adams, also emulating its production techniques within lead single "Don't I Hold You". Folk rock singer Melissa Ferrick called it "a huge record" which inspired her song "Drive", saying, "Janet Jackson was making these sexual noises on that record and I cannot even describe. [...] I was like "This is unbelievable. Janet Jackson is so ballsy to do this. This is amazing." Cassie Ramone of Vivian Girls and folk singer Seth Glier regarded the album as an important life memoir. Swedish singer Beatrice Eli stated it "defined her teenage years". Art Nouvea considered Fiona Apple's When the Pawn... to be influenced by the record. FKA Twigs' single "Water Me" and Laura Welsh's "Unravel" were likened to the album, considered to evoke Jackson's "mellower work" at her "most delicate". Kingdom's "Bank Head", featuring Kelela, was thought to be influenced by "Empty", while Kelela and Tink's "Want It" was likened to the album's "most tuneful deep cuts". British singer Jai Paul's "Str8 Outta Mumbai" was regarded to fuse "vintage Bollywood pop" with "Velvet Rope-era Janet".

It also paved the way for mainstream artists to incorporate darker themes into their music while tapping their personal lives as inspiration — with Beyoncé's Beyoncé and Lemonade albums as well as Rihanna's Rated R and Anti albums being prime examples.

The Weeknd's Thursday was likened to an attempted "male equivalent" of the record. Kelly Rowland's Talk a Good Game drew comparisons for its revealing theme and production. Rowland's single "Dirty Laundry" was influenced by "What About", while single "Gone", featuring Wiz Khalifa, was inspired by "Got 'til It's Gone". TLC's "I'm Good at Being Bad" was inspired by the production and content of Jackson's "What About". Solange's True EP was compared within its production from Dev Hynes. The composition of single "Losing You" was also likened to "Together Again" for its melancholy theme within an "uplifting" dance song. Illangelo's "Clockwork" was also thought to recall the album. In hip-hop, Odd Future collective The Internet were compared to "''Velvet Rope-era Janet" for their single "Cocaine". Kanye West's 808s & Heartbreak was also likened to the album. Jay-Z compared his song "December 4th" to "Got 'til It's Gone" in his memoir, Decoded. Joe Budden sampled the title track in the song "Velvet Rope". In jazz, its singles have been covered by Boney James and Gene Dunlap, with the title track covered by Paul Taylor and "Anything" by Will Downing. The album is considered to have influenced the development of alternative R&B, associated with acts such as Frank Ocean, Miguel, SZA and others.

Psychologist Alan Downs' book The Velvet Rage was titled after the album and its homosexual content; demonstrating "how to heal the trauma of being a gay man in an uncompromisingly straight world." Transgender activist Janet Mock named herself after Jackson and the album's themes of sexual orientation, stating, "she was so open and raw. She was talking about her sexual fluidity. She was talking about access and elitism with the velvet rope, who gets to come in, who doesn't. She was talking about domestic violence. All of these things within this album... my mind was blown. I couldn't believe someone was talking about all of these issues that were paralleling my own life." "Speaker Phone" was referenced by comedian Sandra Bernhard during a monologue in "I'm Still Here... Damn It!". The album was also mentioned in the Family Guy episode, "And the Wiener Is..."

== Track listing ==
All tracks are written by Janet Jackson, James Harris III, Terry Lewis, and René Elizondo Jr., except where noted.

Standard edition (CD)
No.	Title	Writer(s)	Length
1.	"Interlude – Twisted Elegance"		0:41
2.	"Velvet Rope" (featuring Vanessa-Mae)	Jackson; Harris; Lewis; Elizondo; Malcolm McLaren; Trevor Horn; Mike Oldfield	4:55
3.	"You"	Jackson; Harris; Lewis; Elizondo; Sylvester Allen; Morris Dickerson; Harold Brown; Howard Scott; Leroy Jordan; Lee Oskar; Charles Miller	4:42
4.	"Got 'til It's Gone" (featuring Q-Tip and Joni Mitchell)	Jackson; Harris; Lewis; Elizondo; Joni Mitchell; Kamaal Ibn Fareed	4:01
5.	"Interlude – Speaker Phone"		0:54
6.	"My Need"	Jackson; Harris; Lewis; Elizondo; Marilyn McLeod; Pam Sawyer; Nickolas Ashford; Valerie Simpson	3:44
7.	"Interlude – Fasten Your Seatbelts"		0:19
8.	"Go Deep"		4:42
9.	"Free Xone"	Jackson; Harris; Lewis; Elizondo; Billy Buttier; Michael Hepburn; James Brown; Archie Bell	4:57
10.	"Interlude – Memory"		0:04
11.	"Together Again"		5:01
12.	"Interlude – Online"		0:19
13.	"Empty"		4:32
14.	"Interlude – Full"		0:12
15.	"What About"		4:24
16.	"Every Time"		4:17
17.	"Tonight's the Night"	Rod Stewart	5:07
18.	"I Get Lonely"		5:17
19.	"Rope Burn"		4:15
20.	"Anything"		4:54
21.	"Interlude – Sad"		0:10
22.	"Special" (includes hidden track (Note: "Special" includes a hidden track "Can't Be Stopped" starting at 3:42.))		7:55
Total length:			75:11

Japanese bonus track
No.	Title	Length
22.	"Special"	3:21
23.	"God's Stepchild" (includes hidden track (Note: "God's Stepchild" includes a hidden track "Can't Be Stopped" starting at 3:42.))	7:55

2022 deluxe version (component 1)
No.	Title	Writer(s)	Length
22.	"Special"		3:21
23.	"Can't Be Stopped"		4:13
24.	"Accept Me"	Jackson; Harris; Lewis	4:07
25.	"God's Stepchild"		3:30

Special edition / digital deluxe version (bonus disc)
No.	Title	Remixer(s)	Length
1.	"Got 'til It's Gone" (Armand Van Helden Bonus Beats)	Armand Van Helden	5:05
2.	"Together Again" (Tony Humphries 12-inch Edit Mix)	Tony Humphries	9:57
3.	"I Get Lonely" (Janet vs Jason – The Club Remix)	Jason Nevins	8:10
4.	"Go Deep" (Vocal Deep Disco Dub)	Masters at Work	8:12
5.	"Every Time" (Jam & Lewis Disco Remix)	Jimmy Jam & Terry Lewis	4:10

2022 deluxe version (component 2)
No.	Title	Remixer(s)	Length
1.	"I Get Lonely" (TNT Remix Edit) (featuring Blackstreet)	Teddy Riley	4:18
2.	"Got Til It's Gone" (Ummah Jay Dee's Revenge Mix) (featuring Q-Tip and Joni Mitchell)	The Ummah	3:46
3.	"Go Deep" (Timbaland/Missy Mix) (featuring Missy Elliott)	Timbaland	5:34
4.	"Together Again" (Jimmy Jam Deeper Mix)	Jimmy Jam	4:52
5.	"Every Time" (Jam & Lewis Disco Remix)	Jimmy Jam & Terry Lewis	4:10
6.	"I Get Lonely" (Jam & Lewis Feel My Bass Mix)	Jimmy Jam & Terry Lewis	5:19
7.	"Got Til' It's Gone" (Def Club Mix)	David Morales and Frankie Knuckles	10:56
8.	"Together Again" (Tony Moran 12-inch Club Mix)	Tony Moran	11:03
9.	"Go Deep" (Masters at Work Thunder Mix)	Masters at Work	9:06
10.	"Together Again" (Tony Humphries Club Mix Edit)	Tony Humphries	10:00
11.	"I Get Lonely" (Janet vs Jason – The Club Remix)	Jason Nevins	8:10
12.	"Go Deep" (Masters at Work Vocal Deep Disco Dub)	Masters at Work	8:12
13.	"Got Til' It's Gone" (Armand Van Helden Bonus Beats)	Armand Van Helden	5:08

Sample credits

- "Velvet Rope" samples "Hobo Scratch" by Malcolm McLaren and The World Famous Supreme Team and "Tubular Bells" by Mike Oldfield.
- "You" samples "The Cisco Kid" by War.
- "Got 'til It's Gone" samples "Big Yellow Taxi" by Joni Mitchell and "Feel So High" by Des'ree.
- "My Need" samples "Love Hangover" by Diana Ross, "You're All I Need to Get By" by Marvin Gaye and Tammi Terrell, "I Need You" by America and "Vibeology " by Paula Abdul.
- "Go Deep" samples "One Nation Under a Groove" by Funkadelic.
- "Free Xone" samples "Think (About It)" by Lyn Collins, "Tighten Up" by Archie Bell & the Drells, "Joyous" by Pleasure and "Don't You Worry 'bout a Thing" by Stevie Wonder.
- "Tonight's the Night" samples "Yes We Can Can" by The Pointer Sisters.
- "Can't Be Stopped" samples "Inner City Blues (Make Me Wanna Holler)" by Marvin Gaye.

== Personnel ==
Credits adapted from AllMusic.

Musicians

- Janet Jackson – lead vocals, background vocals
- David Barry – guitar
- Lee Blaske – string arrangements
- Jan Chong – violin
- Carolyn Daws – violin
- Hanley Daws – violin
- Glen Donnellen – viola
- Lynne Erickson – trumpet
- Charles Gray – viola
- Alyssa Hanson – additional vocals
- Rayvaline Harrell – choir director
- Shawnette Heard – additional vocals
- Camilla Heller – cello
- Kenny Holmen – clarinet, flute, saxophone
- Joshua Koestenbaum – cello
- Kelly Konno – additional vocals
- Tina Landon – additional vocals
- Brenda Mickens – violin
- Joni Mitchell – guest vocals
- Debbie Morrison – additional vocals
- Dale Newton – cello
- Willie R. Norwood – choir director
- Alice Preves – viola
- Prof. T. – additional vocals
- Q-Tip – rap vocals
- Myrna Rain – viola
- Nicholas Raths – guitar
- Gary Raynor – bass
- Alexander Richbourg – drum machine, additional vocals
- Miko Salone – additional vocals
- Mike Scott – guitar
- Leslie Shank – violin
- Daryl Skobba – cello
- Liz Sobieski – violin
- Mike Sobieski – violin
- Daria Tedeschi – violin
- United Children's Choir – choir vocals
- Vanessa-Mae – guest violin
- James "Big Jim" Wright – organ, keyboards, additional vocals

Production

- Lee Blaske – string arrangements
- Flavia Cureteu – design
- Steve Durkee – assistant engineer
- René Elizondo Jr. – executive producer
- Brian Gardner – mastering
- Steve Gerdes – design
- Steve Hodge – engineer, mixing
- Ken Holmen – clarinet, flute, saxophone
- Janet Jackson – producer, executive producer, vocal arrangement, rhythm arrangements
- Jimmy Jam – producer, vocal arrangement, rhythm arrangements
- Tim Lauber – recording engineer, assistant engineer
- Terry Lewis – producer, vocal arrangement, rhythm arrangements
- Michael McCoy – assistant engineer
- Mike Ozdozzi – mastering assistant
- Len Peltier – art direction
- Alexander Richbourg - rhythm arrangements
- Xavier Smith – assistant engineer
- Mario Testino – photography
- Ellen von Unwerth – photography
- James "Big Jim" Wright - rhythm arrangements
- Bradley Yost – assistant engineer

== Charts ==
=== Weekly charts ===
Chart (1997–98)	Peak position
Australian Albums (ARIA)	4
Austrian Albums (Ö3 Austria)	9
Belgian Albums (Ultratop Flanders)	11
Belgian Albums (Ultratop Wallonia)	14
Canadian Albums (Billboard)	2
Canadian R&B Albums (SoundScan)	1
Danish Albums (Hitlisten)	1
Dutch Albums (Album Top 100)	3
European Top 100 Albums (Billboard)	4
Finnish Albums (Suomen virallinen lista)	19
French Albums (SNEP)	5
German Albums (Offizielle Top 100)	5
Greek Albums (IFPI)	15
Hungarian Albums (MAHASZ)	40
Icelandic Albums (Íslenski listinn)	20
Irish Albums (IRMA)	7
Italian Albums (FIMI)	11
Italian Albums (Musica e dischi)	10
Japanese Albums (Oricon)	10
New Zealand Albums (RMNZ)	8
Norwegian Albums (VG-lista)	4
Scottish Albums (Official Charts)	18
Spanish Albums (AFYVE)	10
Swedish Albums (Sverigetopplistan)	4
Swiss Albums (Schweizer Hitparade)	5
UK Albums (Official Charts)	6
UK R&B Albums (Official Charts)	1
US Billboard 200	1
US Top R&B/Hip-Hop Albums (Billboard)	2
US NAC/Smooth Jazz Albums (Radio & Records)	27

=== Year-end charts ===
Chart (1997)	Position
Australian Albums (ARIA)	42
Belgian Albums (Ultratop Wallonia)	85
Canadian Albums (SoundScan)	57
Canadian R&B Albums (SoundScan)	9
Danish Albums (Hitlisten)	40
European Top 100 Albums (Music & Media)	49
French Albums (SNEP)	19
German Albums (Offizielle Top 100)	85
Norwegian Albums (VG-lista)	17
Norwegian Autumn Albums (VG-lista)	5
Swedish Albums (Sverigetopplistan)	73
UK Albums (OCC)	77
US Billboard 200	115
US Top R&B/Hip-Hop Albums (Billboard)	62
Chart (1998)	Position
Australian Albums (ARIA)	82
Belgian Albums (Ultratop Flanders)	43
Belgian Albums (Ultratop Wallonia)	39
Canadian Top Albums (RPM)	34
Canadian Albums (SoundScan)	49
Canadian R&B Albums (SoundScan)	6
Danish Albums (Hitlisten)	9
Dutch Albums (MegaCharts)	20
European Top 100 Albums (Music & Media)	19
French Albums (SNEP)	17
German Albums (Offizielle Top 100)	28
Italian Albums (Musica e dischi)	60
New Zealand Albums (RMNZ)	39
Norwegian Winter Albums (VG-lista)	12
Swiss Albums (Schweizer Hitparade)	43
UK Albums (OCC)	73
US Billboard 200	27
US Top R&B/Hip-Hop Albums (Billboard)	6

== Certifications and sales ==
Region	Certification	Certified units/sales
Australia (ARIA)	2× Platinum	140,000^{^}
Belgium (BRMA)	Gold	25,000^{*}
Canada (Music Canada)	3× Platinum	300,000^{^}
Denmark (IFPI Danmark)	2× Platinum	101,000
France (SNEP)	Platinum	300,000^{*}
Germany (BVMI)	Gold	250,000^{^}
Italy	—	150,000
Japan (RIAJ)	Platinum	200,000^{^}
Netherlands (NVPI)	Platinum	100,000^{^}
New Zealand (RMNZ)	Platinum	15,000^{^}
Norway (IFPI Norway)	Platinum	55,000
Spain (Promusicae)	Platinum	100,000^{^}
Sweden (GLF)	Gold	40,000^{^}
Switzerland (IFPI Switzerland)	Platinum	50,000^{^}
United Kingdom (BPI)	Platinum	367,000
United States (RIAA)	3× Platinum	3,649,000
Summaries
Europe (IFPI)	Platinum	1,000,000^{*}
Worldwide	—	8,000,000
^{*} Sales figures based on certification alone.^{^} Shipments figures based on certification alone.

== See also ==
- List of Billboard 200 number-one albums of 1997
