= Go Deep =

1998 single by Janet Jackson

Single by Janet Jackson

from the album The Velvet Rope
- Released: June 15, 1998
- Studio: The Hit Factory (New York City); Record Plant (Los Angeles); Flyte Tyme (Edina, Minnesota)
- Genre: Pop
- Length: 4:42
- Label: Virgin
- Songwriters: Janet Jackson; James Harris III; Terry Lewis; René Elizondo Jr.
- Producers: Janet Jackson; Jimmy Jam; Terry Lewis

Janet Jackson singles chronology
"Every Time" (1998)	"Go Deep" (1998)	"Luv Me, Luv Me" (1998)

Music video
- "Go Deep" on YouTube

"Go Deep" is a song by American singer Janet Jackson from her sixth studio album, The Velvet Rope (1997). It was written and produced by Jackson, Jimmy Jam and Terry Lewis, with Jackson's then-husband René Elizondo Jr collaborating on the lyrics. The song was released as the fourth single from the album on June 15, 1998, by Virgin Records. A pop song, "Go Deep" talks about Jackson having a night out clubbing with her friends, and wanting to meet a man to have sex with him. Official remixes for the song were released, featuring Missy "Misdemeanor" Elliott, Teddy Riley and Timbaland.

"Go Deep" received generally positive reviews from music critics, who found the song "irresistible" and "brilliant", and appreciated its party vibe. Commercially, it fared well worldwide, reaching number two in Canada, charting within the top 20 in Iceland, New Zealand and the United Kingdom, and topping the US Hot Dance Club Play chart. An accompanying music video directed by Jonathan Dayton and Valerie Faris depicts a teen boy having a daydream with Jackson giving a party in his house while his parents are out of town. The singer performed "Go Deep" on The Velvet Rope Tour (1998–99), Number Ones, Up Close and Personal tour (2011), and on both of her Las Vegas residency shows, Janet Jackson: Metamorphosis (2019), and Janet Jackson: Las Vegas (2024–25).

== Background and composition ==
In 1997, Jackson released her sixth studio album The Velvet Rope; it chronicled her emotional breakdown, stemming from self-hatred, childhood humiliation, physical abuse, and distorted body image. Its lead single, "Got 'til It's Gone", peaked at number three on the Hot R&B Airplay chart. The following singles "Together Again" and "I Get Lonely" also were commercial successes – both peaking within the top three on the US Billboard Hot 100. "Go Deep" was then promoted as the fourth international single from The Velvet Rope; Virgin Records sent the single to rhythmic contemporary and urban radios in the United States on June 9, 1998, and to contemporary hit radio on June 30. It also received a release in the United Kingdom on June 15, followed by a July 13 release in other European countries and Oceania. Official remixes for the song were released, featuring rappers Missy "Misdemeanor" Elliott and Timbaland and musician Teddy Riley. Author Ayanna Dozier writes that by collaborating with Elliott and Timbaland, Jackson was "making conscious decisions to place herself in dialogue with the changing hip-hop landscape".

"Go Deep"
A 27-second sample of the song's chorus, demonstrating Jackson's vocals performed with a "girlish breathiness".

"Go Deep" was written and produced by Jackson, Jimmy Jam and Terry Lewis, with lyrics co-written by René Elizondo Jr, Jackson's husband at the time, though this fact was kept secret until the couple filed for divorce in 2000. According to the sheet music published at Musicnotes.com by EMI Music Publishing, the song is set in time signature of common time with a moderately slow tempo of 100 beats per minute, in the key of G-flat major, with Jackson's vocals spanning from Gb_{3} to Gb_{5}. A pop song, "Go Deep" was described by Billboard as a "danceable track with deep, syncopated beats", overlaid by Jackson's vocals which were described by The New York Times as "girlish breathiness". Rolling Stone called the track a "pulsing erotic groover". Crowd voices and body percussion evoke a party atmosphere. Rick de Yampert of The Tennessean observed traces of New jill swing in its composition, while Austin American-Statesman's Michael Corcoran opined that the track was influenced by Madonna's work. Jeff Hall of Courier-Post observed the "lean funk backing with an ultra smooth vocal arrangement" on "Go Deep".

Lyrically, the song talks about Jackson having a night out with her friends, with the singer asserting on the chorus: "We go deep and we don't get no sleep / Cause we be up all night until the early light". During the song, Jackson expresses her wish to meet a man in a club and have sex with him; Jonathan Bernstein of The New York Observer wrote that the lyrics showed "her desire to cruise a club, snag a stud, drag him home and do him". Multiple reviewers thought that the lyrics were hedonistic. Mark Guarino of The Daily Herald described the lyrics to "Go Deep" as "loose".

== Critical reception ==
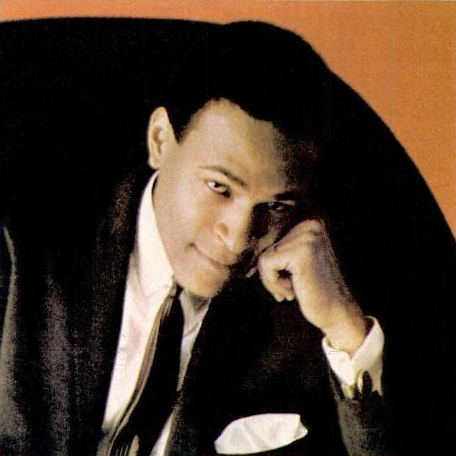
Marvin Gaye (pictured) was identified by Renowned for Sound as an inspiration for the song.

"Go Deep" received generally positive reviews from music critics. Larry Flick from Billboard called the song "infectious" and "irresistible", while praising the singer's choice for the artists featured on the remixes, saying that she deserved "props for having good taste in friends", although he noted that it was "a risky move that could alienate longtime mainstream listeners". Sarah Davis of Dotmusic wrote that the track was a "finely-tuned piece designed for late-night dancefloor business – and classic radio", classifying it as "brilliant". Daryl Easlea from the BBC Music found the song "sleek, slippery", while Patrick Higgs of Evansville Courier and Press thought it was "particularly appealing". For Mark Guarino of The Daily Herald, "Go Deep" has a "party girl vibe about club hopping which is purely joyful". Erika D. Peterman from Tampa Bay Times opined that the track continued the party vibe of the album with "an irresistible chorus and a borderline hedonistic vibe." Similarly, Steve Jones, writing for USA Today, considered it a "hedonistic romp over banging dance grooves". According to Richard Torres from Newsday, "Go Deep" was one of the "sheer sample-happy delights" on The Velvet Rope. Curtis Ross of The Tampa Tribune considered the song a "dance floor sure-shot" with its "rubbery bass line". According to New York Daily News's Jim Farber, Jackson's voice was "a special effect, a gimmick that clicks".

Andrew Le from Renowned for Sound described the song as "the album's 'Escapade', possibly even a prequel to Janet's 'single life' follow-up 'All For You'". He went on the say that "it is a welcome distraction from the personal issues explored on the album and a infectiously catchy, slinky soundtrack for going out". Its party vibe and lyrical rhyming was seen as a tribute to Marvin Gaye. Chuck Arnold of Entertainment Weekly agreed, commenting that "bringing some levity to the heavier themes of the album, 'Go Deep' is the only real party song on The Velvet Rope", and it also "captures the fun spirit of camaraderie Jackson has always shared with her dancers". J.D. Considine, writing for the same magazine, stated, "However much 'Go Deep' may read like a hymn to hedonism, what it sounds like is a song of pride in which Jackson and crew celebrate not sex but the confidence that allows them to act sexual when they feel the urge". Brian McCollum from The Bellingham Herald considered "Go Deep" a "jeep thumper with a tough, taut chorus". Offering a more negative review, Tallahassee Democrat's Chuck Beard thought that the first eight seconds of the song sound promising, until the "obnoxious chorus kicks in". Richard Harrington from The Washington Post considered the track "a little stiff". Carl Wolf of The Star Press criticized the song's lyrics, writing, "This isn't the sexual liberation of a woman or a man, but the enslavement of our relationships to shallow pleasures and temporary situations."

== Commercial performance ==
In the United States, "Go Deep" was not released as a physical single, thus did not chart on the Billboard Hot 100 due to chart rules at the time. However, the song peaked at number 28 on the Radio Songs chart, and reached the summit of the Hot Dance Club Play chart. Additionally, it reached the top 10 on Billboard's Rhythmic Top 40 and the top 20 on the Mainstream Top 40 and Hot R&B Airplay charts. In Canada, the track debuted at number 96 on the RPM 100 Hit Tracks chart and reached number two on the week dated September 21, 1998. It also reached number three on the Urban Top 30 chart. In the United Kingdom, "Go Deep" entered the UK Singles Chart at number 13 on the week ending June 27, 1998, and spent five weeks on the chart. In April 2021, it was revealed by the Official Charts Company that the single was Jackson's 34th most downloaded track in the region. Across Europe, the song attained moderate success; it reached number 15 in Belgium, as well as the Top 40 in France, the Netherlands and Scotland. Its commercial performance in the European countries helped it attain a peak of number 28 on the European Hot 100 Singles chart, on the issue dated July 4, 1998. In Australia, "Go Deep" debuted at number 43 on August 16, 1998. The next weeks it peaked at number 39, and was present for a total of eight weeks on the chart. In New Zealand, it was more successful, by debuting at number 19 and peaking at number 13 for two consecutive weeks.

== Music video ==
Jackson (pictured), covered in foam, about to kiss Hodges' character in the video.

The accompanying music video for "Go Deep" was directed by Jonathan Dayton and Valerie Faris. American actor Ty Hodges portrays a teen boy whose parents have left town for the weekend. Japanese-American singer Ai, who at the time was just a teenager before the start of her career, also appears in the music video as a backup dancer. Many of the shots use a Snorricam camera extended out from Hodges' body and aimed back at him. Two years earlier, Dayton and Faris had employed some Snorricam shots in their video for "1979" by the Smashing Pumpkins. Dozier wrote that Jackson, Dayton, and Faris likely chose the Snorricam and similar close-up point-of-view shots as a "creative aesthetic to bring her [Jackson's] body closer to her fans", and one of the "key examples of her creating possibilities for fan interconnectivity and intimacy."

The video begins with Hodges' parents leaving the house for a few days. Hodges orders a pizza and watches Jackson's music videos in his room before dozing off, then the doorbell rings and it turns out to be Jackson and her friends asking to come in. They invite more friends over and a large house party ensues. A foam party erupts because the washing machine is pouring out soapsuds. Jackson and Hodges end up in his room, with him on the bed and her leaning in to kiss him, but a pizza deliveryman rings the doorbell and awakens Hodges, showing that the whole party was an elaborate dream with the singer.

Candace McDuffie from Glamour commented that the video contained a "vibrant and playful energy" that exemplified The Velvet Rope era. Patrick Demarco of Philadelphia ranked it as the singer's ninth best, and said it "didn't have the huge budget of her previous work, but indeed much more effective because of it", and observed it was "one of her most underrated videos, but iconic for quite a few fabulous reasons." For The Boombox's Jacinta Howard, the clip was Jackson's 19th "most iconic" music video. She stated, "It's a fun, party video that matches the song's breezy, dance vibe". It was ranked number 50 on Complex's "The 50 Best R&B Videos of the '90s" list; Ernest Baker wrote that the plot was "still a model example of how to have a good time in the '90s". The music video for "Go Deep" appears on the DVD edition of 2001's All for You as well as the 2004 video compilation From Janet to Damita Jo: The Videos. The blouse Jackson wears in the video was auctioned for US$3,840 in May 2021.

== Live performances ==
Jackson sang the song during the encore of her 1998–99 The Velvet Rope Tour, on a stage decorated with chandeliers. Natasha Kassulke from Wisconsin State Journal complimented the performance, saying it "came off as an electric dance groove echoing some trip hop talents". The performance of the song at the October 11, 1998, show in New York City, at the Madison Square Garden, was broadcast during a special titled The Velvet Rope: Live in Madison Square Garden by HBO, and it was included on the concert's VHS home video release, The Velvet Rope Tour: Live in Concert (1999). Jackson performed the Timbaland remix version on her 2019 Janet Jackson: Metamorphosis Las Vegas residency and was also added to her 2024-2025 Las Vegas residency titled Janet Jackson: Las Vegas.

== Track listings ==
UK CD single

1. "Go Deep" (Jam & Lewis radio edit) – 3:30
2. "Go Deep" (Jam & Lewis extended mix) – 5:32

US 12-inch promo single

1. "Go Deep" (Timbaland/Missy remix) – 5:33
2. "Go Deep" (Missy edit) – 4:03
3. "Go Deep" (Teddy Riley Nation remix) – 5:43
4. "Go Deep" (T.R. Funk mix) – 5:39

Canadian, European, Japanese and UK CD single

1. "Go Deep" (album version) – 4:42
2. "Go Deep" (T.R. Funk mix) – 5:40
3. "Go Deep" (Roni Size remix) – 7:25
4. "Go Deep" (Masters at Work alternative mix) – 8:32
5. "Go Deep" (Masters at Work downtempo mix) – 5:20

UK 12-inch single

1. "Go Deep" (Masters at Work Thunder mix) – 9:05
2. "Go Deep" (Jam & Lewis extended album mix) – 5:32
3. "Go Deep" (Timbaland/Missy remix) – 5:33

== Credits and personnel ==
Credits adapted from The Velvet Rope liner notes.

- Janet Jackson – lead and backing vocals, songwriter, producer, rhythm and vocal arrangement
- James Harris III – songwriter, producer, all other instruments, rhythm and vocal arrangement
- Terry Lewis – songwriter, producer, all other instruments, rhythm and vocal arrangement
- René Elizondo Jr. – songwriter
- Kelly Konno – crowd vocals
- Shawnette Heard – crowd vocals
- Tina Landon – crowd vocals
- Alex Richbourg – drum programming
- Mike Scott – guitar
- Steve Hodge – vocal recording, engineering, mixing
- Michael McCoy – assistant recording
- Tim Lauber – assistant engineer
- Xavier Smith – assistant engineer

== Charts ==
=== Weekly charts ===
Weekly chart performance for "Go Deep"
Chart (1998)	Peak position
Australia (ARIA)	39
Belgium (Ultratip Bubbling Under Flanders)	15
Canada Contemporary Hit Radio (BDS)	2
Canada (Nielsen SoundScan)	9
Canada Top Singles (RPM)	2
Canada Dance/Urban (RPM)	3
Europe (Eurochart Hot 100)	28
France (SNEP)	22
Germany (GfK)	72
Iceland (Íslenski Listinn Topp 40)	10
Netherlands (Dutch Top 40)	38
Netherlands (Single Top 100)	54
New Zealand (Recorded Music NZ)	13
Scottish Singles Sales (Official Charts)	25
UK Singles (Official Charts)	13
UK Dance (Official Charts)	5
UK Hip Hop/R&B (Official Charts)	3
UK Airplay (Music Week)	28
US Radio Songs (Billboard)	28
US Dance Club Songs (Billboard)	1
US Pop Airplay (Billboard)	12
US R&B/Hip-Hop Airplay (Billboard)	11
US Rhythmic Airplay (Billboard)	8

=== Year-end charts ===
Year-end chart performance for "Go Deep"
Chart (1998)	Position
Canada (Nielsen SoundScan)	41
Canada Top Singles (RPM)	29
Canada Urban (RPM)	33
US Hot 100 Airplay (Billboard)	64
US Dance Club Play (Billboard)	42
US Hot R&B Airplay (Billboard)	72
US Mainstream Top 40 (Billboard)	42
US Rhythmic Top 40 (Billboard)	37

== Release history ==
Region	Date	Format(s)	Label(s)	Ref.
United States	June 9, 1998	Rhythmic contemporary; urban radio	Virgin	
United Kingdom	June 15, 1998	12-inch vinyl; CD; cassette	Virgin	
Japan	June 27, 1998	Maxi single	EMI Music Japan	
United States	June 30, 1998	Contemporary hit radio	Virgin	
France	July 13, 1998	Maxi single	Virgin	
Australia	July 13, 1998	Maxi single	Virgin	
