= Every Time (Janet Jackson song) =

1998 single by Janet Jackson

- U.S. promotional cover

Single by Janet Jackson

from the album The Velvet Rope
- B-side: "Accept Me"
- Released: March 25, 1998
- Genre: Pop
- Length: 4:17
- Label: Virgin
- Songwriters: Janet Jackson; James Harris III; Terry Lewis; René Elizondo Jr.
- Producers: Janet Jackson; Jimmy Jam and Terry Lewis

Janet Jackson singles chronology
"I Get Lonely" (1998)	"Every Time" (1998)	"Go Deep" (1998)

Music video
- "Every Time" on YouTube

"Every Time" is a song by American singer Janet Jackson from her sixth studio album, The Velvet Rope (1997). In Japan, it was released as the album's third single on March 25, 1998, while in the United States, it was released as the album's sixth and final single in November 1998. The song has been described as a ballad that lyrically delves into the protagonist's fear of love. Jackson performed it on the last Japanese date of The Velvet Rope Tour in Tokyo and on her 2025 Las Vegas residency Janet Jackson: Las Vegas.

== Critical response ==
Billboard magazine's review was positive, stating, "'Every Time' ranks with [Jackson's] most memorable ballads, such as "Let's Wait Awhile" and "Again", calling on the things that make Janet so effective with this type of delicate material: Her voice quivers with emotion as she practically whispers about the promise and fear of an imminent romance, while steadfast writer/producer team Jimmy Jam and Terry Lewis wrap her vocal around a beautiful and sensuous chorus. This song sounds so perfect with the more civil pace of fall, it's an easy decision across the board, at top 40, AC, and R&B. Absolutely destined to be one of her greats."

A reviewer from Birmingham Evening Mail wrote, "Gorgeous ballad featuring Miss Jackson's quivering vocals, a piano, strings and some understated percussion." J.D. Considine for Entertainment Weekly deemed it as one of the album's most affecting moments, noting "when the chords in the chorus to "Every Time" modulate into melancholy as Jackson observes that "every time I fall in love/It seems to never last"." Music Week thought Janet was "at her most relaxed" and called her delivery over the songs piano hook as "delicate", but felt that radio "is already spoilt for choice for ballads and many may feel this is a release too far." Andrew Le from Renowned for Sound website called the song "tender, angelic", and also commented that it was "far superior than the overrated, soppy saccharine Again, as it has an even better piano hook and more intimate vocal performance".

== Chart performance ==
The single peaked at number fifty-two in Australia, number sixty-seven in Germany, and number ninety-five in France. But in Iceland it peaked at number 5. In the US it failed to chart on the Billboard Hot 100, but peaked at number twenty-five on the Bubbling Under Hot 100 Singles chart.

== Music video ==
The accompanying music video was filmed in the then-new Therme Vals spa in Vals, Graubünden, in the Swiss Alps, with direction by Matthew Rolston in association with Howard Schatz, an expert in underwater photography. It was premiered on October 5, 1998, on HBO, and was subsequently exhibited twice a day leading up to the broadcast of the concert special for The Velvet Rope Tour one week later. The music video shows Jackson partially nude in water. A strong theme of green is seen in the video through lighting, the fabric surrounding Jackson's body and her contact lenses. The video was featured on the limited bonus-DVD edition of 2001's All for You as well as the 2004 DVD From Janet to Damita Jo: The Videos.

Britney Spears' "Everytime" has been compared to Jackson's video for "Every Time", with a critic noting, "The original pop queen Janet bared all in a blue lagoon for her "Every Time" video. A little less glam, Britney's tub scene in her "Everytime" video proved dark foreshadowing into her troubled world." Rihanna's "Stay" music video was also compared to both Spears and Jackson's "Everytime" videos, saying "Rihanna isn't the first pop star to brood in a bathtub. Janet Jackson and Britney Spears also bared their emotion immersed in water".

== Live performances ==
In 1998, Jackson performed it on the last Japanese date of The Velvet Rope Tour in Tokyo. Nearly 30 years later, Jackson included the song on her last leg of the 2025 Las Vegas residency, Janet Jackson: Las Vegas.

== Track listings ==
- UK CD single
1. "Every Time" (album version) – 4:17
2. "Every Time" (Jam & Lewis Disco remix) – 4:10
3. "Accept Me" – 4:07
- European 12-inch single
1. "Every Time" (album version) – 4:17
2. "Every Time" (Jam & Lewis Disco remix) – 4:10
3. "Every Time" (Jam & Lewis Disco remix instrumental) – 4:10
- Japanese CD single
1. "Every Time" (album version) – 4:17
2. "I Get Lonely" (Jason's Special Sauce dub) – 6:44
3. "I Get Lonely" (The Jason Nevins radio remix) – 3:13

== Charts ==
Chart (1998–1999)	Peak position
Australia (ARIA)	52
Belgium (Ultratip Bubbling Under Flanders)	2
France (SNEP)	95
Germany (GfK)	67
Iceland (Íslenski Listinn Topp 40)	5
Netherlands (Dutch Top 40)	29
Netherlands (Single Top 100)	38
New Zealand (Recorded Music NZ)	34
Scotland Singles (OCC)	54
UK Singles (OCC)	46
UK Hip Hop/R&B (OCC)	9
US Bubbling Under Hot 100 (Billboard)	25
US Rhythmic Airplay (Billboard)	25
US CHR/Pop (Radio & Records)	44
US CHR/Rhythmic (Radio & Records)	25
US NAC/Smooth Jazz Tracks (Radio & Records)	21

== Release history ==
Region	Date	Format(s)	Label(s)	Ref.
Japan	March 25, 1998	CD	Virgin	
United States	November 3, 1998	Contemporary hit radio	Virgin	
United Kingdom	December 7, 1998	12-inch vinyl; CD; cassette	Virgin	
