= The Velvet Rage =

2005 self-help book by Alan Downs

- First edition cover
- Author: Alan Downs
- Language: English
- Subject: Homosexuality, Minority stress
- Genre: Self-help
- Publisher: Lifelong Books
- Publication date: May 24, 2005
- Publication place: United States
- Pages: 212
- ISBN: 978-0-7382-1061-2

The Velvet Rage: Overcoming the Pain of Growing Up Gay in a Straight Man's World is a self-help book by clinical psychologist Alan Downs, originally published on May 24, 2005, by Lifelong Books. The book explores the challenges faced by gay men as they navigate societal expectations, discrimination, and internalized shame. It delves into the impact of heteronormativity, the struggle for acceptance, and the development of a gay identity. Downs also provides insights and strategies for overcoming the psychological barriers that may hinder personal growth and fulfillment.

The Velvet Rage has been praised for its candid and compassionate approach to addressing the unique struggles faced by gay men, and it has become a widely discussed and influential work within the LGBTQ community. Reviews in the Toronto Star and the Washington Blade found the book to make overgeneralizations.

A second edition was published on June 5, 2012.
