= Got 'til It's Gone =

1997 single by Janet Jackson

Single by Janet Jackson featuring Q-Tip and Joni Mitchell

from the album The Velvet Rope
- Released: September 22, 1997
- Recorded: 1997
- Studio: The Hit Factory (New York City) (rap)
- Genre: R&B; pop; hip-hop
- Length: 4:01 (album version); 3:37 (single version)
- Label: Virgin
- Songwriters: Janet Jackson; James Harris III; Terry Lewis; René Elizondo Jr.; Joni Mitchell; Kamaal Ibn Fareed
- Producers: Janet Jackson; Jimmy Jam and Terry Lewis

Janet Jackson singles chronology
"Twenty Foreplay" (1996)	"Got 'til It's Gone" (1997)	"Together Again" (1997)

Joni Mitchell singles chronology
"Two Grey Rooms" (1994)	"Got 'til It's Gone" (1997)	"The Crazy Cries of Love" (1998)

Q-Tip singles chronology
"One Love" (1994)	"Got 'til It's Gone" (1997)	"Get Involved" (1999)

Music video
- "Got 'til It's Gone" on YouTube

"Got 'til It's Gone" is a song by the American singer Janet Jackson, featuring the rapper Q-Tip and the Canadian singer Joni Mitchell, from Jackson's sixth album, The Velvet Rope (1997). It was written by Jackson, Jam and Lewis, with additional writing by René Elizondo Jr. and Q-Tip. The song was produced by Jackson, Jam and Lewis, with Jam suggesting the repeated vocal sample of Mitchell. It was released as the lead single from The Velvet Rope in September 1997 by Virgin Records. The song was recorded at Flyte Tyme Studios in Edina, Minnesota. For "Got 'til It's Gone", Jackson opted for a less polished sound which resulted in a blend of R&B, pop, and hip-hop with traces of reggae influences.

"Got 'til It's Gone" was met with mostly positive reviews from music critics, with most praising its fusion of Jackson's pop style with hip-hop, and for its revealing theme. "Got 'til It's Gone" was not released as a commercial single in the United States, making it ineligible to appear on the Billboard Hot 100 at the time. However, the song peaked at number 36 on the Billboard Hot 100 Airplay chart and reached number three on the Billboard Hot R&B Airplay chart. Internationally, "Got 'til It's Gone" reached the top 20 in several European markets, including France, Germany, Ireland, Italy, Switzerland, and the United Kingdom.

The accompanying music video for "Got 'til It's Gone" was directed by Mark Romanek and filmed at the Hollywood Palladium in Los Angeles, and premiered right before the 1997 MTV Video Music Awards. Jackson portrays a lounge singer in the video, which takes place during the time of apartheid in South Africa. It was called a masterpiece by critics, winning a Grammy Award for Best Short Form Music Video. Jackson has performed "Got 'til It's Gone" on all of her concert tours since its release. The song was also covered by singer Marsha Ambrosius, and was also a source for several book titles.

== Background and release ==
In 1996, Janet Jackson renewed her contract with company Virgin Records for $80 million—the largest recording contract up to that time and a breakthrough she achieved for the second time in her career. She then began developing her sixth album, The Velvet Rope, drawing from her struggles with depression and intimacy. In an interview for MTV, she discussed how frequent depression caused her to take breaks from her music career. She felt this was heightened by her estrangement from the rest of the Jackson family. Jimmy Jam was aware of Jackson's difficulty, noticing how she would spontaneously cancel recording sessions and frequently appear troubled. Jackson discussed "Got 'til It's Gone" and The Velvet Rope album during an interview with Rolling Stone, saying:

Singing these songs has meant digging up pain that I buried a long time ago. It's been hard and sometimes confusing. But I've had to do it. I've been burying pain my whole life. It's like kicking dirt under the carpet. At some point there's so much dirt that you start to choke. Well, I've been choking. My therapy came in writing these songs. Then I had to find the courage to sing them or else suffer the consequences – a permanent case of the blues.

The song's music video and promotional photos were the first glimpse of the new image Jackson developed for The Velvet Rope campaign, which combined elements from Gothic and African cultures and consisted of red hair, nasal and body piercings, and several tattoos. In an interview with Dotmusic, she commented how she was a fan of Joni Mitchell's work, and that she knew she wanted a rapper on this album, but did not know who and on what song she could do that, until she found Q-Tip was the "perfect person" for "Got 'til It's Gone". She described his voice as "mellow and laid-back like the vocal". "Got 'til It's Gone" was serviced to multiple airplay formats, including pop, urban, rhythmic, and adult contemporary/jazz, on September 2, 1997, as the lead single from The Velvet Rope. In the United Kingdom, Virgin released the song on September 22, 1997, as a CD single, a 12-inch vinyl single, and a cassette single. Later that year, on November 10, a two-disc 12-inch single was released. In Japan, a CD single was issued on October 29, 1997.

== Composition and lyrical interpretation ==
"Got 'til It's Gone"
24-second sample of the song.

"Got 'til It's Gone" was written by Jackson, Jimmy Jam and Terry Lewis, René Elizondo Jr., Q-Tip and Joni Mitchell, and features guest vocals from the latter artists. It contains a sample from Mitchell's 1970 song "Big Yellow Taxi", selected by Jam but approved by Jackson because she was a longtime fan of Mitchell's music through her brother Randy. According to the sheet music published at Musicnotes.com by EMI Music Publishing, the song is set in common time with a key of F major. Jackson's vocals range between G_{3} to C_{5}. The song has a moderate tempo of 96 beats per minute. For "Got 'til It's Gone", Jackson opted for a less polished sound, the song itself is a blend of various genres such as R&B, pop, and hip-hop; it also has influences of reggae. It was inspired by J Dilla's remix of the Brand New Heavies' song "Sometimes", released a few months prior in 1997. Jam spoke of the song's crossover potential, commenting, "Janet has always been one of those artists that bridges R&B and hip-hop and pop and rock". We really thought 'Got 'Til It's Gone' would be accepted [by all audiences] across the board". Jackson revealed that lyrically, "Got 'Til It's Gone" is about a great life lesson she learned—appreciate what you have while you have it. When discussing the song with Jet magazine, Jackson stated, "In my life, I try to take nothing for granted, even if I don't always succeed".

Jackson told why she felt compelled to combine the folk elements from Mitchell with Q-Tip's rap verse, saying "Him and Joni Mitchell have something in common: what they write is poetry". "I think of folk and rap among similar strands. Especially lyrically because you can put so much content into one song. Hip-hop is great and I think it's good that it talks of the harsh realities of life in the ghettos". Speaking about Q-Tip's appearance, Jackson said, "Q-Tip represents all that's creative and strong about rap. He's real and right to the point, and I loved working with him". Jackson has frequently mentioned Mitchell as an influence and artist she's admired throughout her career, which led to Jackson asking Mitchell to contribute vocals to "Got 'til It's Gone". Jackson stated, "As a kid I was drawn to Joni Mitchell records. Joni's songs spoke to me in an intimate, personal way." Jackson contacted Mitchell personally to ask for permission to use the sample, stating "everyone said it couldn't be done, but if [Mitchell] was going to say no to me, I had to hear it from her myself [...] I called her and told her I wanted her to hear it before she made a decision. Everybody was surprised when a couple of days later, she said yes". Describing the situation, Jackson recalled, "I told her I'd like to send her a tape before she made a decision. She listened to it, and called back a few days later and said she absolutely loved it and would be honored if we did, so I was very excited".

=== Des'ree controversy ===
After the release of "Got 'til It's Gone", British singer Des'ree thought the song was very similar to her own song "Feel So High" from her 1992 album Mind Adventures, and sued Jackson and the producers of the song. In July 1998, she was awarded an out-of-court settlement granting her 25 per cent of the publishing royalties from the song; around £2 million. Des'ree later said that her "aim wasn't to get money out of her", but it was purely for justice, as she wanted Jackson to recognize that she had "borrowed" from her work and not given her credit.

== Critical reception ==
"Got 'til It's Gone" received mostly positive reviews from music critics. Billboard magazine said that the song displays "finesse" and "marked maturity", saying, "Apparently, 'tis the season for pop divas to explore edgy hip-hop territory" and "this jam is a deftly structured study in subtle vocal styling and raw keep rhythms". During the review they also noted the departure from Jackson's upbeat pop and dance style might confuse listeners at first, though was ultimately a wise decision. In its twentieth anniversary, the magazine ranked it as the 29th greatest pop song of 1997. Neil McCormick of The Daily Telegraph approved the song as "a deliciously light confection". Chris Willman from Entertainment Weekly said that the "relaxed groove" of the song is "certainly an enigmatic teaser". Rob Fitzpatrick of The Guardian described it as an "absolutely sublime pop production", saying Jackson sounded "fresher than ever". Fitzpatrick also praised the song's simple production, adding the "revolutionary use of space and dynamics worked wonders on the radio and in clubs". Jet magazine commented, "Janet has her fans up on the dance floor with the album's first hit Got Til It's Gone", calling Q-Tip's guest verse "street smart". Elysa Gardner from Los Angeles Times also gave the track a positive review, saying the "cool, breezy hip-hop" of the single "cannily intertwines a Joni Mitchell sample and a seductive guest rap by Q-Tip."

Gil Kaufman from MTV observed the song "sets the tone for the new, more experimental material", complete with "a spooky vocal loop", "old-school DJ scratching" and "layering it all with Jackson's fragile, whispered vocals, the song is then, now and later all at the same time". British magazine Music Week rated it four out of five, picking it as Single of the Week. They added, "Jackson's most untypical single to date, this loosely woven groove steals a sample from Joni Mitchell's Big Yellow Taxi and throws in a Q-Tip rap for good measure to subtly work its magic." Editor Alan Jones wrote, "Her voice is sweet and pretty, and the Mitchell sample sounds surprisingiy appropriate." Jon Pareles from The New York Times considered it "hip-hop-tinged R&B", also noticing "a depressive sobriety" in Jackson's vocals. A reviewer from People magazine praised the track as "an understated, hip-hop pastiche that features the unlikely but inspired pairing of rapper Q-Tip and a sampled Joni Mitchell". Martin Johnson from San Francisco Weekly classified it as "a clever pastiche" which blended well with Jackson's vocals and Q-Tip's "low-key rapping". John Christopher Farley from Time magazine considered it an "R&B reworking" which "draws smartly" from the sample.

== Chart performance ==
"Got 'til It's Gone" was not released as a commercial single in the United States, making it ineligible to appear on the Billboard Hot 100 and several other charts under the chart rules that existed at that time. The song peaked at number 36 on the Hot 100 Airplay and number three on Hot R&B Airplay charts. In Canada, the song debuted at number 41 on the RPM 100 Hit Tracks chart on the issue dated September 15, 1997, and peaked at number 19 on November 17, 1997. In Australia, "Got 'til It's Gone" debuted at number 13 on the issue dated October 5, 1997, peaking at number 10 and staying on the ARIA Singles Chart for 15 weeks and was certified Gold by the Australian Recording Industry Association (ARIA) for 30,000 copies shipped. In New Zealand, it debuted at its peak of number four, staying on the chart for 12 weeks. It was also certified gold by Recorded Music NZ (RMNZ) for shipping 15,000 copies across the country.

"Got 'til It's Gone" debuted and peaked at number six on the UK Singles Chart on the week of October 4, 1997, spending eleven weeks on the chart. It was certified silver by the British Phonographic Industry (BPI) eventually selling nearly 200,000 units in the region. In Austria, it entered the singles chart at number 32. During its fourth week, it rose to its peak of number 11, spending a total of 17 weeks on the chart. In France, the song also peaked at number 11, and was certified Gold by the Syndicat National de l'Édition Phonographique (SNEP). In the Netherlands, "Got 'til It's Gone" entered the singles' chart at number 50 during the week of September 27, 1997. It eventually reached number nine, staying a total of 13 weeks on the chart. On the Swiss Singles Chart dated October 12, 1997, "Got 'til It's Gone" debuted at number 32. After four weeks, it peaked at number 11.

== Music video ==
=== Background and synopsis ===
Jackson portraying a lounge singer during the time of apartheid in South Africa in the music video

The accompanying music video for "Got 'til It's Gone" was directed by Mark Romanek and filmed at the Hollywood Palladium in Los Angeles. It made its worldwide premiere on September 4, 1997, immediately preceding the 1997 MTV Video Music Awards, with the video airing later the same evening on other music channels such as VH1 and BET.

"[...] it was a situation of what I was into at that time, and I was really into this magazine that was popular in South Africa called Drum Magazine. I guess it was sort of like the 'Life Magazine' of the township, and the photography was stunning, and I said 'I would like to make a video that depicted Black culture that wasn't so obsessed, as a lot of the hip-hop videos were in that period and still are, with less materialism and sexism. I just felt like 'there's got to be other aspects of Black culture to depict'".

— Romanek on the video's theme.

Jackson wanted to work with Romanek because she believed him to be "amazing", commenting, "I gravitate toward the directors that I really fall in love with [...]". After hearing the song, Romanek decided to use African photography as a motif, creating what he called a "pre-Apartheid celebration based on that African photography". Joni Mitchell commented: "From the time [music] video began well into the late eighties there was a monstrous image of females being perpetrated without much exception. In the face of that I found this video to be full of humanity. Janet herself was lovely. It had dignity, and it was full of life". Jackson stated that she was "very proud" of the video, adding it was "fun to make".

In the music video, Jackson portrays a lounge singer during the time of apartheid in South Africa. Inspired by a blend of '60s and '70s African culture, the video depicts freedom and prosperity, opposing racial segregation and supremacy. Jackson wears "vintage wide-lapeled brown leather jacket, men's tailored trousers, a printed halter top and individually-sectioned pigtails that bring to mind "the higher the hair, the closer to God", according to Soulbounce website. The video portrays a massive house party and includes scenes inspired by the work of photographer Malick Sidibé. Images shown throughout the video include a cigarette lighter flicking by a man's groin, a young child peeking behind a man as if he had been magically birthed, a one-eyed boxer posing, a couple dancing provocatively, children jumping on mattresses, a lone figure walking outside, and Jackson's shadow crawling up a wall like a stalking animal. Joni Mitchell appears on a TV screen throughout the video, and Sudanese model Alek Wek also makes a cameo. The video ends with a bottle thrown at a segregation sign in English and Afrikaans, which represents a rebellion against discrimination and racism and a celebration of freedom and embracing unity.

=== Reception and analysis ===
Slant Magazine called the "Got Til' Its Gone" video a "masterpiece" and elaborated that it had "as much substance as it does style. Set in South Africa during the time of apartheid, the video is a celebration of the music and rhythms that helped sustain black culture under the weight of segregation. As for style, Janet, who dons little-to-no make-up and a bead of sweat on her brow, has never looked so sexy". MusicOMH observed that the video "stands out" in comparison to Jackson's other clips and "has a powerful impact, a nice shot of Joni Mitchell at the opening and a very dark canvas for Jackson and Q-Tip to work on". Blues & Soul magazine described the clip as "a genuine tour de force. Subtly (and not so subtly) conveying images from a party in the South African townships, together with flash-photography shots of Janet and herself and one Q-Tip of [A] Tribe Called Quest. The whole thing emphasizes the elusive, not to say, precious value of happiness as something to savor. As with the rest of the set, it is perhaps Janet's most mature vehicle yet". Complex commented on the video, saying "This is about as cool as videos get. So many incredible style references in this one it's like a moving Tumblr". In the book Unruly Media: Youtube, Music Video, and the New Digital Cinema, author Carol Vernallis analyzed that despite the video's "bevy of loaded images tied to race and myth", its mood and tone are "overwhelmingly warm", drawing attention to Jackson's and Mitchell's vocal similarities.

At the 40th Annual Grammy Awards, the music video for "Got 'til It's Gone" won a Grammy Award for Best Short Form Music Video. It also received the most nominations at the seventh annual MVPA Awards, winning "Pop Video of the Year" and "Best Art Direction". Billboard magazine noted that "the biggest surprise was that Janet Jackson's "Got 'Til It's Gone" clip was completely shut out" of winning Video of the Year, despite receiving the most nominations. However. the publication noted that the video had "stiff competition" in all of its nominated categories. It was also the winner of VH1's "Most Stylish Video" award in 1997, and was additionally ranked number ten on a list of the "100 Greatest Music Videos of All Time" by Slant Magazine. Complex also placed the video at number 15 on their list of the 25 Most Stylish Hip-Hop Videos.

== Live performances ==
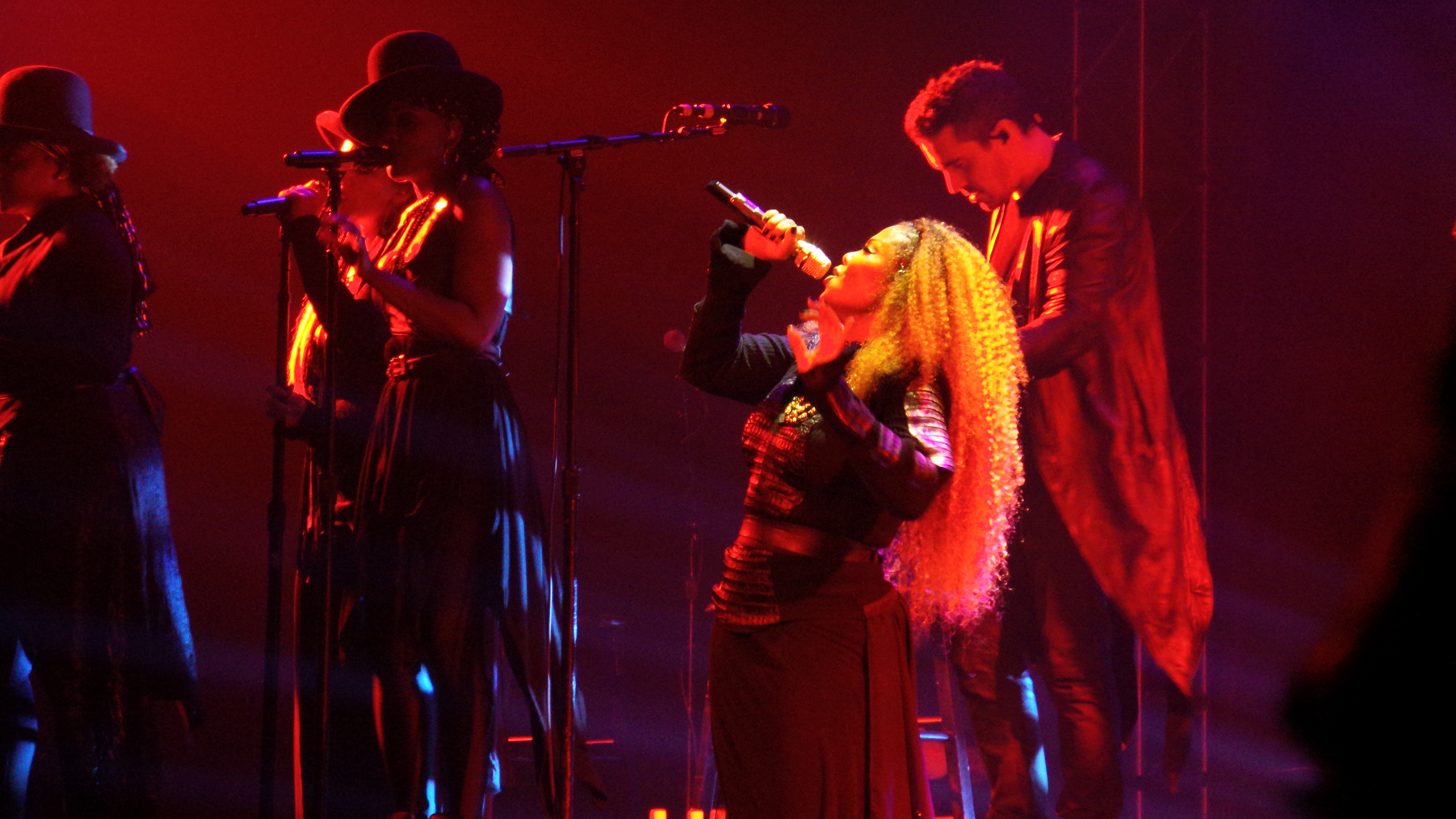
Jackson performing "Got 'til It's Gone" during her Unbreakable World Tour.

To promote "Got 'til It's Gone" and The Velvet Rope, Jackson performed the song on Top of the Pops and Graines de Star during her European promotional tour, Australian and Japanese TV shows Hey Hey It's Saturday and Hey! Hey! Hey! Music Champ. After returning to the United States, she performed it on The Oprah Winfrey Show along with "Together Again". Upon returning to her promotional tour in Europe, she performed "Got 'til It's Gone" on French TV programs Les Années Tubes, Hit Machine along with "Together Again", and Spanish television on TV show Música Sí.

The singer has also performed "Got 'til It's Gone" on all of her tours since its release. She included the song on the 1998 The Velvet Rope Tour. With the stage decorated with chandeliers while dressed up in "sensible clothing", Jackson performed it as part of the encore of the concert. MTV praised the performance as "high energy", and was also described as a "hypnotic rendition" by The Washington Post. The performance of the song at the October 11, 1998, show in New York City, at the Madison Square Garden, was broadcast during a special titled The Velvet Rope: Live in Madison Square Garden by HBO. It was also added to the setlist at its DVD release, The Velvet Rope Tour – Live in Concert in 1999.

It was again performed on the All for You Tour in support of her follow-up album All for You in 2001 and 2002. MTV noted the absence of Joni Mitchell on the video screens, when compared to the previous performance of "Son of a Gun (I Betcha Think This Song Is About You)", when singer Carly Simon, sampled on the song, "showed up for a special video guest star appearance". The February 16, 2002, final date of the tour at the Aloha Stadium in Hawaii, was broadcast by HBO, and included a performance of "Got 'til it's Gone". This rendition was also added to the setlist at its DVD release, Janet: Live in Hawaii, in 2002. After a period of six years without going on tour, Jackson embarked on the 2008 Rock Witchu Tour, and included "Got 'til It's Gone" on its setlist. The performance featured a pre-recorded video of Q-Tip performing his verses while Jackson sang on stage. The song was performed as a dedication to the city of Gold Coast, Australia on November 2, 2011, during the Number Ones: Up Close and Personal tour. Jackson also included the song on her 2015-16 Unbreakable World Tour, and on her 2017-2019 State of the World Tour. The song was also included on the setlist of her 2019 Las Vegas Residency Janet Jackson: Metamorphosis.

== Usage in media and cover version ==
The song inspired the title of the novel Got til It's Gone, published in 2008, and is mentioned throughout the book. Larry Duplechan's 2008 novel was also titled after the song and references Jackson in the book. Producer Djrum credits "Got 'til It's Gone" as one of the songs which inspired him to pursue a career as a DJ. The song was used on the CBS science fiction series Now and Again, with the show's executive producer saying "the song's melancholy was appropriate" to be used during a scene where actor John Goodman's character passes away. The song is mentioned in Jay-Z's 2010 memoir Decoded, in which he compares the song's meaning to the theme of "December 4th", which appeared on his eighth studio album The Black Album (2003). The song is also mentioned in the novels Getting to the Good Part and In Due Time.

In 2012, British singer Marsha Ambrosius covered the song with rapper TWyse. TWyse's rap verse was different from Q-Tip's and Ambrosius re-sang the Joni Mitchell sample. It was featured on the album Bone Appétit Vol. 1 – Main Course by Jeff Bradshaw, released by Hidden Beach Recordings. The video for their cover was dedicated to the seven-year anniversary of Hurricane Katrina and was shot in New Orleans, Louisiana.

== Track listings ==
- UK, Australian, and Japanese CD single
1. "Got 'til It's Gone" (radio edit) – 3:39
2. "Got 'til It's Gone" (Mellow mix) – 5:11
3. "Got 'til It's Gone" (Nellee Hooper master mix) – 4:18
4. "Got 'til It's Gone" (Mellow mix edit) – 3:51
5. "Got 'til It's Gone" (album version) – 4:00
- UK 12-inch single

A1. "Got 'til It's Gone" (album version) – 4:00
A2. "Got 'til It's Gone" (instrumental) – 4:49
B1. "Got 'til It's Gone" (Mellow mix) – 5:11
B2. "Got 'til It's Gone" (Nellee Hooper master mix) – 4:18

- UK cassette single
1. "Got 'til It's Gone" (radio edit) – 3:39
2. "Got 'til It's Gone" (Mellow mix) – 5:11
3. "Got 'til It's Gone" (Nellee Hooper master mix) – 4:18
4. "Got 'til It's Gone" (Mellow mix edit) – 3:51
- European CD single
1. "Got 'til It's Gone" (radio edit) – 3:39
2. "Got 'til It's Gone" (Mellow mix) – 5:11

== Credits and personnel ==
Credits for "Got 'til It's Gone" are adapted from The Velvet Rope liner notes.

Recording

- Rap recorded at The Hit Factory Studios (New York City)
- Engineered and mixed at Flyte Tyme Studios (Edina, Minnesota)
- Mastered at Bernie Grundman Mastering (Hollywood, California)

Personnel

- Janet Jackson – songwriting, lead vocals, producing, vocal arrangements
- James Harris III – songwriting, producing, vocal and rhythm arrangements, all other instruments
- Terry Lewis – songwriting, producing, vocal and rhythm arrangements, all other instruments
- René Elizondo Jr. – songwriting
- Joni Mitchell – songwriting, vocals
- Q-Tip – songwriting (as Kamaal Ibn Fareed), rap vocals
- Alex Richbourg – drum programming
- Steve Hodge – rap recording, engineering, mixing
- Michael McCoy – assistant recording (rap)
- Brad Yost – assistant engineering
- Xavier Smith – assistant engineering

== Charts ==
=== Weekly charts ===
Weekly chart performance for "Got 'til It's Gone"
Chart (1997)	Peak position
Australia (ARIA)	10
Austria (Ö3 Austria Top 40)	21
Belgium (Ultratop 50 Flanders)	23
Belgium (Ultratop 50 Wallonia)	29
Canada Top Singles (RPM)	19
Canada Dance/Urban (RPM)	1
Canada Contemporary Hit Radio (BDS)	10
Denmark (IFPI)	5
Europe (Eurochart Hot 100)	6
Finland (Suomen virallinen lista)	17
France (SNEP)	11
Germany (GfK)	17
Hungary (Mahasz)	3
Iceland (Íslenski Listinn Topp 40)	14
Ireland (IRMA)	16
Israel (Israeli Singles Chart)	19
Italy (FIMI)	19
Italy Airplay (Music & Media)	2
Netherlands (Dutch Top 40)	6
Netherlands (Single Top 100)	9
New Zealand (Recorded Music NZ)	4
Norway (VG-lista)	13
Scottish Singles Sales (Official Charts)	14
Sweden (Sverigetopplistan)	6
Switzerland (Schweizer Hitparade)	11
Taiwan (IFPI)	9
UK Singles (Official Charts)	6
UK Hip Hop/R&B (Official Charts)	1
UK Airplay (Music Week)	14
US Radio Songs (Billboard)	36
US Dance Club Songs (Billboard)	6
US R&B/Hip-Hop Airplay (Billboard)	3
US Rhythmic Airplay (Billboard)	12

=== Year-end charts ===
Year-end chart performance for "Got 'til It's Gone"
Chart (1997)	Position
Australia (ARIA)	74
Canada Dance/Urban (RPM)	20
Europe (European Hot 100 Singles)	46
France (SNEP)	59
Netherlands (Dutch Top 40)	72
Netherlands (Single Top 100)	53
New Zealand (RIANZ)	48
Sweden (Topplistan)	37
UK Singles (OCC)	66
US Hot R&B Airplay (Billboard)	53
US Rhythmic Top 40 (Billboard)	61

== Certifications ==
Certifications and sales for "Got 'til It's Gone"
Region	Certification	Certified units/sales
Australia (ARIA)	Gold	35,000^{^}
France (SNEP)	Gold	250,000^{*}
New Zealand (RMNZ)	Gold	15,000^{‡}
United Kingdom (BPI)	Silver	200,000^{^}
^{*} Sales figures based on certification alone.^{^} Shipments figures based on certification alone.^{‡} Sales+streaming figures based on certification alone.
