= APLA Health =

American non-profit organization

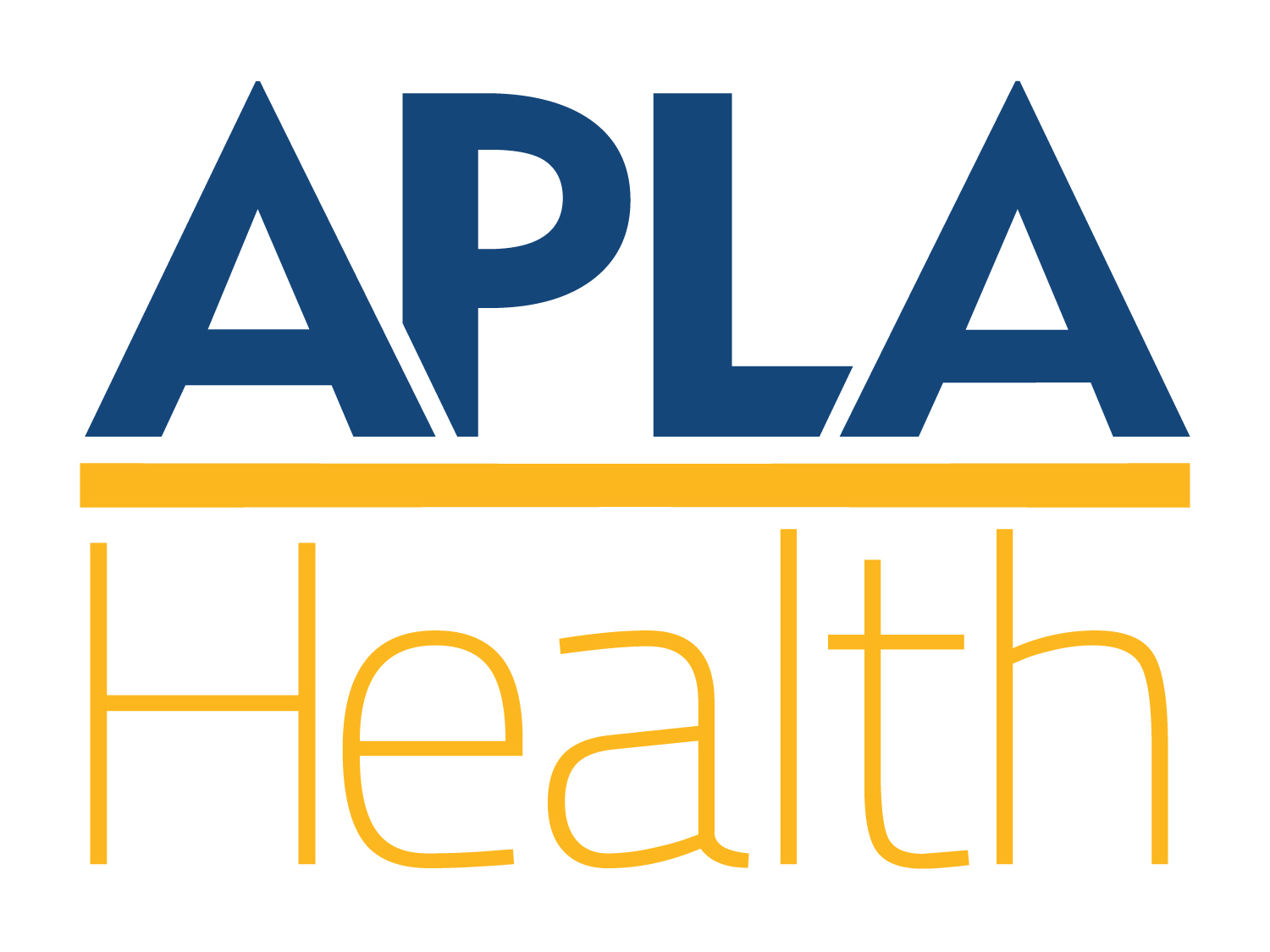
- Founded: 1983 (43 years ago)
- Founders: Max Drew, Nancy Cole Sawaya, Matt Redman and Erv Munro
- Type: Non-profit organization
- Purpose: "to achieve health care equity and promote well-being for the LGBT and other underserved communities and people living with and affected by HIV."
- Location: Los Angeles, California, U.S.
- Origins: Los Angeles
- Region served: United States
- Key people: Craig E. Thompson, chief executive officer
- Website: aplahealth.org

APLA Health is a non-profit organization based in California, United States, focused on building healthcare capacity and promoting wellbeing for LGBT people and those living with HIV. It was founded as AIDS Project Los Angeles in 1983, and is now among the largest non-profit HIV service organizations in the United States.

== History ==
The organization was founded as AIDS Project Los Angeles in 1983 by Max Drew, Nancy Cole Sawaya, Matt Redman and Erv Munro.

In 2011, APLA opened a second 501(c)(3) organization, APLA Health & Wellness to provide HIV prevention services, economic development programs and social activities for gay and bisexual men and transgender individuals of color. In 2013, APLA Health established the Gleicher/Chen Health Center in Baldwin Hills, Los Angeles, to provide medical services, followed by the Long Beach Health Center in 2016 and APLA Health – Olympic in 2018.

In 2016, AIDS Project Los Angeles and APLA Health & Wellness began doing business collectively as APLA Health.

=== Events ===
In December 1982, they held the first APLA Health fundraiser, which raised over $7,000. Many early fundraising events were held in gay bars and discos. A fundraiser at the West Hollywood nightclub Studio One in March 1984, featuring comedian Joan Rivers, raised $45,000 for APLA Health and other new AIDS service organizations.

On July 28, 1985, APLA held the world's first AIDS Walk. Days before the event took place, Hollywood actor Rock Hudson revealed that he had AIDS, which raised the attendance of the walk, raising more than $673,000. In response, actress Elizabeth Taylor helped to spearhead a drive by the entertainment community to confront the disease and established the first Commitment to Life event, held at the Bonaventure Hotel, which honored former First Lady Betty Ford and raised $1.3 million.

== Services ==
Functioning as a Federally Qualified Health Center (FQHC), APLA Health primarily serves individuals who do not have health insurance or have difficulty accessing comprehensive medical care. Among the services provided by the organization are primary medical, dental and behavioral health care, housing, case management, nutritional health, treatment adherence, and home health. APLA Health operates eight Vance North Necessities of Life Program (NOLP) food pantry locations around Los Angeles and collaborates with five other organizations to provide food pantry services across the United States.

APLA Health also provides HIV access services to low-income individuals or other vulnerable groups in Los Angeles County. Its outreach targets communities such as men who have sex with men (MSM), men of color, and transgender women.

== Global advocacy ==
M-Pact Global Action for Gay Men's Health and Rights was founded in 2006 at the Toronto International AIDS Conference by an international group of activists, including AIDS Project Los Angeles, to advocate for equitable access to HIV prevention, care, treatment, and support services for gay men and bisexual men, including those living with HIV.

Applied research conducted by APLA Health's CBR team addresses topics relating to HIV and LGBT health, and the study findings are used by APLA Health to develop new services, improve existing ones and highlight trends in the field.
