= René Elizondo Jr. =

American songwriter (born 1962)

René Elizondo, Jr.
- Born: July 16, 1962 (age 63); Durango, Mexico
- Occupations: Dancer; songwriter; music video director
- Years active: 1982–present
- Spouses: Janet Jackson (m. 1991; div. 2003) Britt Coelho (m. 2010)
- Children: 1

René Elizondo Jr. (born July 16, 1962) is a Mexican dancer, songwriter and music video director. He was married to American singer Janet Jackson from 1991 to 2003.

== Early life and career ==
Born in Durango, Mexico, Elizondo met Jackson in the early 1980s and later became a backup dancer to Janet's older sister La Toya Jackson. Elizondo and Jackson married in 1991. Elizondo directed her videos for "That's the Way Love Goes", "Again", and "Together Again" (Deeper Remix) and was a songwriter on The Velvet Rope. It is his hands that cover Jackson's breasts on the cover of the September 1993 issue of Rolling Stone magazine, the expanded cover art of her janet. album. René also appeared in Jackson's "Come Back to Me" video in 1990 from her album Rhythm Nation (1989). Elizondo was heavily involved in Jackson's business affairs, but the two fell out as marital partners. They separated in January 1999 and the divorce was finalized in October 2003.

In August 2010, Elizondo married Britt Coelho, his longtime girlfriend, in a small beach ceremony. The couple had a baby girl on October 9, 2011.
