= Icon: Number Ones =

Greatest hits album by Janet Jackson
- Released: August 31, 2010
- Recorded: August 1985 – early 2010
- Genre: Pop; R&B
- Length: 52:45
- Label: A&M; UM^{e}
- Producer: Janet Jackson; Rodney Jerkins; Bryan-Michael Cox; Jermaine Dupri; Jimmy Jam and Terry Lewis

Janet Jackson chronology
Number Ones (2009)	Icon: Number Ones (2010)	Unbreakable (2015)

Icon: Number Ones (released as Best of Number Ones on the iTunes Store) is the third greatest hits album by American singer Janet Jackson. It was released on August 31, 2010, by Interscope Geffen A&M Records and Universal Music Enterprises as a part of the Icon album series, designed to feature "the greatest hits, signature tunes and fan favorites of the most popular artists in music history."

== Critical reception ==
Professional ratings
Review scores
Source	Rating
AllMusic	3.5/5 stars

Stephen Thomas Erlewine gave the compilation a three and-a-half out of five star rating, commenting that it was "divided fairly" between her '80s and '90s hits, but also said that "Not every one of her big hits is here — 'The Pleasure Principle', 'Rhythm Nation', 'Love Will Never Do (Without You)', 'If', 'Got Til It's Gone' are all MIA — but this is a good sampler indicating the breadth and depth of Miss Janet’s work."

== Track listings ==
No.	Title	Writer(s)	Original album	Length
1.	"What Have You Done for Me Lately"	Janet Jackson; James Harris III; Terry Lewis	Control (1986)	4:44
2.	"Nasty"	Jackson; Harris; Lewis	Control	4:03
3.	"When I Think of You"	Jackson; Harris; Lewis	Control	3:57
4.	"Miss You Much"	Harris; Lewis	Janet Jackson's Rhythm Nation 1814 (1989)	4:12
5.	"Escapade"	Jackson; Harris; Lewis	Janet Jackson's Rhythm Nation 1814	4:44
6.	"Alright" (7" House Mix with Rap; featuring Heavy D)	Jackson; Harris; Lewis	Janet Jackson's Rhythm Nation 1814	4:59
7.	"That's the Way Love Goes"	Jackson; Harris; Lewis	janet. (1993)	4:25
8.	"Together Again"	Jackson; Harris; Lewis; René Elizondo Jr.	The Velvet Rope (1997)	4:07
9.	"Doesn't Really Matter"	Jackson; Harris; Lewis	Nutty Professor II: The Klumps (soundtrack) (2000) / All for You (2001)	4:56
10.	"All for You"	Jackson; Harris, Lewis; David Romani; Wayne Garfield; Mauro Malavasi	All for You	4:32
11.	"Make Me"	Jackson; Rodney Jerkins; Thomas Lumpkins; Michaela Shiloh	Number Ones (2009)	3:38
12.	"Nothing"	Jackson; Johntá Austin; Bryan-Michael Cox; Jermaine Dupri	Why Did I Get Married Too? soundtrack (2010)	4:10
Total length:				52:45

== Charts ==
Chart performance for Icon: Number Ones
Chart (2010)	Peak position
US Top R&B/Hip-Hop Albums (Billboard)	40
