= Black Cat (song) =

1990 single by Janet Jackson

- US 12-inch single artwork

Single by Janet Jackson

from the album Janet Jackson's Rhythm Nation 1814
- B-side: "The 1814 Megamix"
- Released: June 25, 1990
- Studio: Flyte Tyme (Minneapolis, Minnesota)
- Genre: Hard rock; pop rock; dance-rock; glam metal
- Length: 4:50
- Label: A&M
- Songwriter: Janet Jackson
- Producers: Jellybean Johnson; Janet Jackson

Janet Jackson singles chronology
| "Come Back to Me" (1990) | "Black Cat" (1990) | "Love Will Never Do (Without You)" (1990) |

Music video
- "Black Cat" on YouTube

Alternative cover
- Continental European and Australian artwork

"Black Cat" is a song by American singer Janet Jackson, released as the sixth single from her fourth studio album, Janet Jackson's Rhythm Nation 1814 (1989). The song was written by Jackson, who produced it with Jellybean Johnson. In a departure from her standard of industrial-based dance-pop, "Black Cat" is a hard rock, pop rock, dance-rock, heavy metal and glam metal song with arena rock influences. Its lyrics speak of substance abuse and gang violence. It was the final song recorded for the album, after Jackson, along with Jimmy Jam and Terry Lewis, composed its main riff when desiring a rock song to complete the record.

"Black Cat" was first released in Australia on June 25, 1990, then was issued worldwide throughout the rest of 1990. It was well received among critics, who praised Jackson's "maximum advantage" vocals and her seamless foray into the hard rock genre. It was a commercial success, reaching number one on the US Billboard Hot 100 as well as the top 10 on the charts in Australia, Canada, Norway, and South Africa, among other countries, while peaking at number 15 in the United Kingdom, where it was the highest-charting single from the album. It was certified gold in the United States and Australia.

Its music video, directed by Wayne Isham, was filmed during Jackson's Rhythm Nation World Tour 1990. It used an "in-concert" theme, splicing Jackson with images of a black panther. Jackson performed "Black Cat" at the 1990 MTV Video Music Awards, in a "fiery rendition" of the song in which she conveyed "feline" choreography, and also on the Rhythm Nation World Tour 1990, which drew media attention for its usage of illusionary magic, concluding with Jackson forced into a cage before transformed into a live panther.

"Black Cat" received a Grammy Award nomination for Best Female Rock Vocal Performance. It also earned Jackson a BMI Pop Award for Most Played Song. "Black Cat" has been cited as an influence by numerous artists and it has been covered by such artists as Warmen, Britney Spears, and Nanne Grönvall.

== Background ==
"Black Cat" was written by Jackson and produced by Jackson with Jellybean Johnson. It was a departure from her prior material, being her first sole writing credit and the first time she had worked with producers other than Jimmy Jam and Terry Lewis since the release of Control. The song was a stark contrast for Jackson, transitioning from her customary style of industrial-based dance-pop to the heavy metal and hard rock genre. Jackson considered it a natural transition, having grown up listening to artists such as Led Zeppelin, Def Leppard, and Mötley Crüe. She previously attempted the pop rock genre on "Come Give Your Love to Me", a single from her self-titled debut album. Jackson stated, "I'm very proud of 'Black Cat', which is the first song I've ever written on my own, as well as co-produced." It became the last song recorded for the album, upon Jackson desiring a rock-influenced song to complete the record. "Black Cat" is also the only pop song to be mixed by German metal engineer Michael Wagener, who is known for his work with many hard rock and heavy metal bands in the late 1980s.

Jackson's idea for "Black Cat" was based on a warning to a rebel involved in substance abuse, in addition to the consequences of drug addiction. Its composition compares the theme to the folklore superstitions of cats having nine lives and black cats foreshadowing a negative omen or misfortune. She also related its title to the bold nature of a panther, saying, "I have always felt some kind of connection between myself and a panther. They're not afraid of anything, they're willing to take on anything–that's the way I feel about my work." Regarding its development, she said, "I was getting dressed and ready to go to the studio. The television was on - some commercials and other stuff. I just started humming a melody. I don't know why and it kept sticking in my head. So I put it down on tape." She later recalled Jam and Lewis saying "they thought it was something that might work." Jackson was heavily involved in the song's production, stating:

We were finished with the entire album and I came up with a guitar riff, and ran up to Jimmy and Terry and told them, 'Hey, we should do this.' They said, 'We have a deadline so we couldn't possibly go onto another song.' I told them, it's ok, I'll do it, just throw me in a studio and I'll put everything together... I wrote the riff and the lyrics, and actually the whole thing.

== Recording ==
After playing a piano riff and singing the melody for Jimmy Jam, they recorded a rough vocal track. Jam stated, "She sang me the melody, and then asked "well, what do you think it needs?" I said, Nothing. Go write some lyrics, it's fine", adding, "She had a bunch of different melodies, so we picked the two melodies that worked best." Jam and Lewis chose to forego its production, deciding another producer should execute the song: "We stay away from things we can't do. It's not like, 'We've got to do this, and it's got to be our way.' We're going for the best way." Jam contacted Jellybean Johnson to develop the song with Jackson and help her produce it. Johnson recalled, "She first played the groove for me on piano... I thought it would be cool if I could make Janet sound like a heavy metal queen. I knew the rest of them thought I was out of my mind, but I got a friend to play the guitars. I put toms and cymbals on it. Terry played bass and some sparse keyboards, and it was there." In addition to Johnson, guitarist Dave Barry was asked to contribute after previously providing guitar on "You Can Be Mine" from Jackson's prior album. Barry stated, "I wanted it to be authentic rock and roll. I rocked it out, then Janet and I got together to do the vocals. Janet is a very nice, warm person, and she was receptive to my ideas." Jackson sang the song in an alternate tone, quickly adjusting her vocals in a single take. Johnson described, "One night I told her I wanted her to sound like a rock and roll queen on it–she usually uses one of her other voices .. this, you wanted to be funky, but more rocked out. She did it in one or two takes." Jam added, "I tried to get her to sing a couple of the other vocals in her natural [voice] with kind of an edge on it; she [initially] didn't like the way her voice sounded, but for 'Black Cat', that was exactly what was needed."

== Alternate versions ==
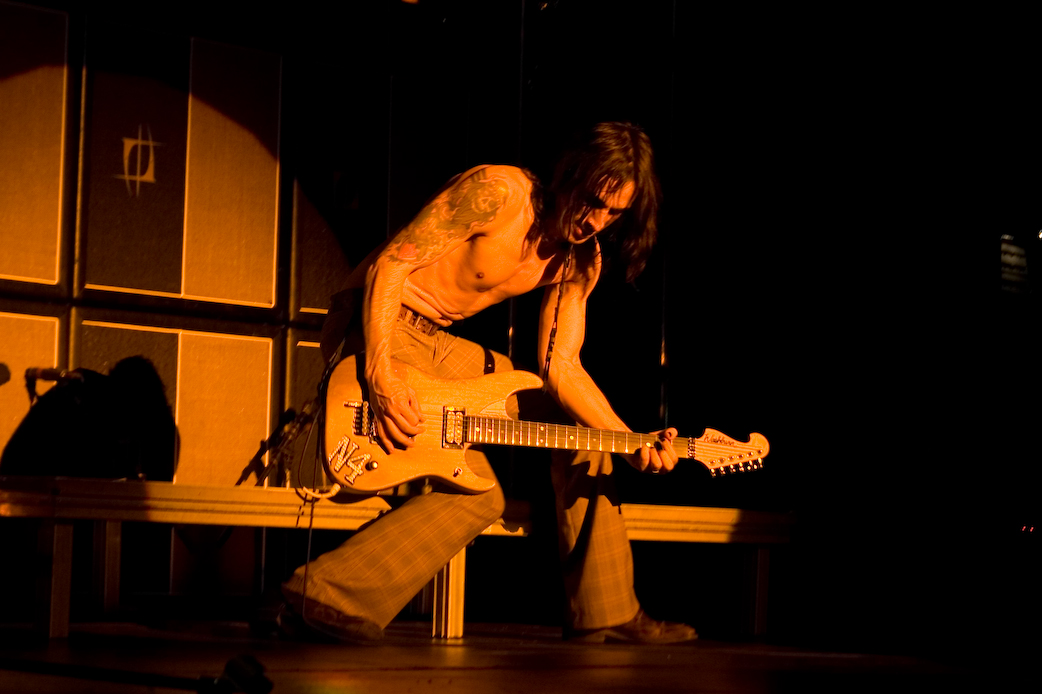
Nuno Bettencourt provides rhythm guitar on the video mix version.

In the album version of "Black Cat", the majority of the guitar riffs are played by David Barry, including the introduction, main riff, as well as a thematic solo. Barry subsequently became Jackson's touring guitarist and tour director. John McClain, former A&R executive for A&M Records, provided the slide guitar, while Jellybean Johnson provided the funky riff that punctuates the song. Terry Lewis contributes on bass guitar. Several remixes incorporate a guitar solo by Jesse Johnson or alternate production from various guitarists. The radio edit and "Video Mix" of "Black Cat" features Nuno Bettencourt of Extreme on additional rhythm guitar. An extended version with a longer guitar solo appeared on Jackson's Design of a Decade: 1986–1996 compilation, while an alternate version with a shortened solo is included on Number Ones. It was mixed by German recording engineer Michael Wagener, who had not previously worked with any pop acts and was approached due to Jackson's desire to "cross over into hard rock." Upon collaborating, Bettencourt said Jackson was "sweet" and "beautiful", jokingly expressing his desire to marry her. In return for Bettencourt's contribution, Jackson was speculated to provide the spoken line "Did you say your prayers? Don't forget to put your tooth under the pillow" on the song "Money (In God We Trust)" from Extreme's sophomore album, Pornograffiti.

The "Guitar Mix" features Vernon Reid of Living Colour. Reid stated, "'Black Cat' was one of my favorite tracks on Rhythm Nation. I had the song and learned the parts, the structure of it, and just went in and did it. I think we used the second take. I just wanted to get into that arena thing. It's meant to sound really big." Jesse Johnson provided a guitar solo which was not used for the album version, but is featured in each of its remixes. The remixes have the added component of live drumming performed by Derek Organ of Switch, showcasing more of a heavy metal feel in the extended solo and double kick drums. Both versions omit the panther roar introduction and vocal refrain closing from the album edit.

Lemmy Kilmister of Motörhead intended to record a version of "Black Cat" with Jackson, but was prohibited. Kilmister stated, "I wanted to do a version of 'Black Cat' with her, but Sony wouldn't let me. You could tell from the video that she was having a good time, that this loud rock music is what she really wanted to be doing. I love that fuckin' song.. Great fuckin' song that but the record company wouldn't let it be possible." Kilmister later revealed Jackson as his most desired collaboration and planned to record a new version with her for his unreleased solo album Lemmy & Friends, saying "I want to get Janet Jackson to do this great lost single called 'Black Cat'." Dave Navarro recorded an additional opening and riffs throughout the version performed on Jackson's Rock Witchu Tour, appearing on screens during the rendition. Navarro previously collaborated with Jackson when remixing "What'll I Do" with the Red Hot Chili Peppers.

== Composition ==
"Black Cat"
A hard rock song, "Black Cat" displays aggression as Jackson warns of the consequences of substance abuse.

"Black Cat" is a hard rock, pop rock, dance-rock, heavy metal and glam metal song with arena rock influences. Jackson's vocals are performed in an alternate tone from her standard technique, described as "visceral" while displaying aggression. Her delivery was also called "feline"-esque and "raking" with a "frisky muscularity". The song uses a driving rock tempo composed in the key of E minor with Jackson's vocals ranging from G_{3} to E_{5}. It has a sequence of E5–A5–B5 as its chord progression during its chorus, using E5 during the verses and B5–A5 during its bridge. It opens with a panther growl and cowbells before transitioning into a "scorching" guitar solo, its intensity likened as between Robert Palmer's "Simply Irresistible" and Deep Purple's "Smoke on the Water" by The New York Times. Its instrumentation was thought to make the song a "headbanger" and successful crossover into the metal genre.'

== Critical reception ==
With [Rhythm Nation] she broke record after record, including an astounding seven top five singles. "Black Cat" hit the hardest, a pure late-'80s hard-rock anthem wailed by one intense young woman. Interestingly, it was also the first single Jackson wrote by herself. Something about fame and fortune inspired a pretty heavy fucking track, and music-lovers (and strippers) have been thankful ever since.

— Danielle Bacher, in a list of "Top 10 Rockin' Songs By Black Artists"

"Black Cat" received positive reception from critics, who placed heavy emphasis on Jackson's foray into hard rock. Chuck Campbell of The News Journal called it her "most intriguing track", saying "Miss Jackson relishes the role of a rocker with unexpected fervor." It was also considered a notable contrast from the "sweet and lovable Janet" of singles such as "Miss You Much", "Love Will Never Do (Without You)", and "Escapade", transitioning to an "edgier front." Whitney Pastorek of Entertainment Weekly stated, "Most hair metal bands would have paid a lifetime in spandex to come up with that guitar line, and then Janet goes and melds it with her funky-fresh backup singers and suddenly you can dance to it — and believe you me, it is not easy to make You're gonna die into a danceable lyric." Elysa Gardner of Vibe said it "rocks with a frisky muscularity", while author W.K. Stratton praised its "thundering bass." Jon Pareles of The New York Times commended its "grimy" and "guitar-driven" approach, which "unleashes a guitar riff somewhere between the Robert Palmer hit 'Simply Irresistible' and Deep Purple's 'Smoke on the Water'." Daniel Durchholz of Amazon stated it "burns the place down with a fierce burst of hard rock", while The Sentinel called it a "dance/rock winner." Andy Kellman of AllMusic considered it a "headbanger" with a "hot, distorted lead guitar break, while Alex Henderson applauded Jackson's vocals as used to their "maximum advantage", declaring it a "pop/rock smoker." Similarly, Logo commended her delivery as it became "less breathy and gets more visceral", displaying aggression. MTV News added Jackson "wailed like a total tigress" throughout the song.

Modern Drummer called it a "guitar-fed workout", while SF Weekly dubbed it a "bristly [...] rock song". It was also called "thrashing", completed by "whining guitar riffs." The Los Angeles Times applauded its "headbangin' bravado", and Renowned for Sound called it a "hard-hitting pop-rock track with great harmonies". Time heralded its "restless beats" and "cool lyrical ferocity", thought to be among Jackson's edgier "walks on the wild side." Anthony Williams of Houston Chronicle applauded it as an "angry, cautionary tale to a boy who thinks he's got nine lives." Dave Tianen of The Sentinel called its theme "a radical statement", considered a "blunt challenge to young men to turn away from gang violence." It was also noted for its "heavy-metal guitar lead", portraying "a street rebel living on the edge." The Daily Gazette called it "a rocker booming with guitar solos." David Koen of Phoenix New Times likened it to Joan Jett, saying "Jackson proves how nasty she can really be", calling its guitar riffs "dirty" enough to induce blushing. Rachel Devitt of Rhapsody considered it the album's highlight, portraying Jackson as a "rocker chick." Stereo Review praised it as "rakish" and "strutting", also "underscored by biting blues licks and a driving beat." It was also thought to be "her most rocking song ever." Elsewhere, it was declared "rock-edged" and "metal-tinged", featuring "sizzling guitar work", while The Boston Globe stated the song immortalized the superstition that some people already feel towards black cats.

== Chart performance ==
In the United States, the song entered the Billboard Hot 100 on September 15, 1990. Six weeks later, it reached number one on the chart. It was the third number one hit from Rhythm Nation 1814 and the sixth of the historic seven singles from the album to enter the top five. It made Jackson the first solo artist to achieve two number one hits in the 1990s. It peaked at number 10 on Hot R&B/Hip-Hop Songs, and 11 on Hot Dance Single Sales. The song was later certified gold by the Recording Industry Association of America (RIAA), becoming Jackson's ninth single to receive a certification. In Canada, it reached number four on RPM's singles chart.

Internationally, "Black Cat" reached number three in South Africa, five in Norway, six in Australia, seven in France and 10 in Switzerland. It peaked at number 11 in Ireland and 15 on the United Kingdom singles chart, also reaching number 16 in Sweden, 18 in the Netherlands, 25 in New Zealand, and within the top 35 of Belgium and Germany. It was certified gold by the Australian Recording Industry Association (ARIA).

== Music video ==
The music video for "Black Cat" was directed by American director Wayne Isham. It was filmed on April 5, 1990, using live concert footage from Jackson's Rhythm Nation World Tour 1990 at the Met Center in Bloomington, Minnesota. In addition to the audience for the sold-out show, the filming reportedly drew an additional 3,000 fans. The video premiered during the tour's first date at the Tacoma Dome during the third leg of the tour, projected on three screens prior to Jackson appearing on stage. It was later debuted on MTV and other music channels in August. The video uses an "in concert" theme, in a similar concept to other hard rock and heavy metal music videos of the era, being a departure from her heavily choreographed videos with various settings. Spliced footage of a black panther is shown throughout the video. Jackson explained, "Black panthers fascinate me. They've become an obsession. During filming, we used a black panther who actually attacked his trainer. Don't ask me why, but I was never fearful. I feel a strange rapport with panthers. They've become an inner symbol. Maybe it's their beauty, maybe their danger, maybe the poetry of their movement. It's as though their strength protects me." It was later included on the Rhythm Nation Compilation and Design of a Decade video release. The video was choreographed by Jackson and Anthony Thomas.

=== Reception ===
The Los Angeles Times called it "elaborately staged" and "meticulously detailed", considered among several "great showcases for Jackson's willingness to stretch beyond her public's conceptions of her." Its "headbangin' bravado" was thought to display her diversity, adding "Jackson is too cagey to be pigeonholed." Parry Gettelman of The Sentinel praised its "feline choreography." Upon its premiere, Dennis Kelly of The Morning Call said, "It stands out as much for its hard-edged guitar as for the fact that Jackson wears white instead of her customary black." Entertainment Weekly also commented it "mixes performance footage with shots of a leashed panther." Jackson's wardrobe and suggestive choreography drew media controversy; also considered to start fashion trends. Lisa Jones of The Village Voice observed Jackson's ensemble to cause a "butt revolution" and increase the fetish for a woman's posterior among the general public, questioning "Once you've seen Janet Jackson gyrate in 'Black Cat,' can you really go back to Twiggy?" In Dear Teen Me: Authors Write Letters to Their Teen Selves, author Jo Whittemore recalled, "You think you're sexy. And we can blame Janet Jackson for that. She's all the rage.. with 'Rhythm Nation' and 'Black Cat' topping the charts, and her music videos are hot. She's sexy, and you want to be sexy, too. That means lace-up boots, tight clothes, and killer dance moves."

== Live performances ==
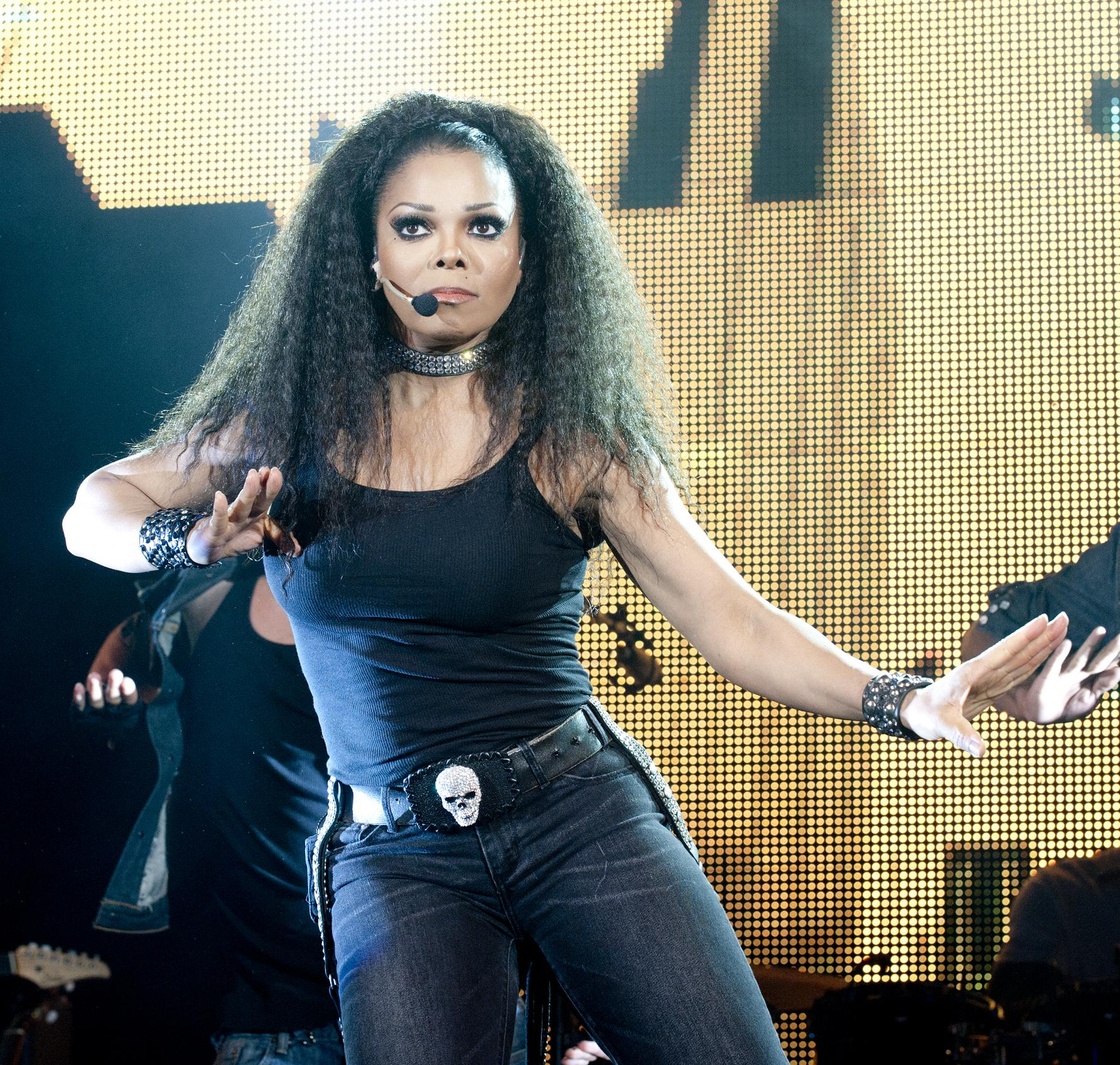
Jackson during the performance of "Black Cat" on her Number Ones, Up Close and Personal tour (2011).

Jackson performed the song at the opening of the 1990 MTV Video Music Awards as her debut performance on the ceremony. During the performance, the singer ripped open her top to expose a black bra underneath, and became highly controversial in the media for its provocative nature, considered to usher in "a new age of sexual spontaneity." It was viewed as the first "shocking" performance of her career due to Jackson having a virginal teenage image, in addition to the portrayal of femme sexuality considered taboo at the time. MTV News explained halfway through her performance, "Although this was no wardrobe malfunction, it was a nonetheless shocking move." It was ranked among "10 Amazing, Shocking Unscripted Moments From '90s MTV", saying "Janet Jackson ushered in a new age of sexual spontaneity on live television [...]. It seems tame now, but it was just the beginning of the more sexualized image she took on in the '90s." VH1 also called it a "fiery rendition." Regarding the performance, Jackson explained, "In the concert, I normally open up my blouse, but for the MTV Awards we found this really neat top that had snaps instead of buttons. So when I undid it - the whole thing went!"

It was performed on the Rhythm Nation World Tour 1990, in a "pyrotechnic interpretation" which ends using illusionary magic of Jackson transforming into a panther in a cage. During the act, "menacing, feline dancers forced Jackson into a cage and covered it with a silver cloth. When they pulled it off, a real, live panther was prowling inside." The performance was also considered as "a rocker booming with guitar solos and fireworks", commended for "utilizing illusions" to entertain the crowd. Dave Tianen of The Sentinel added, "Shifting emotions as quickly as she shifted her head, shoulders, and hips, Jackson and crew launched into a thrashing version of "Black Cat", completed by whining guitar rifts comparable to much heavy metal." On the tour's opening night in Miami, Jackson stated, "The black cat, he peed - on stage!", causing her and several dancers to slip and fall while performing. The panther, named Rhythm, was subsequently removed from the tour after the first leg due to safety concerns, as well as her own love of animals.

The song was performed on all of Jackson's subsequent tours. Jackson's rendition on the Janet World Tour was praised for maintaining "familiar elements" such as its "feline choreography", endeavoring to "bring her MTV videos to life." It was considered a highlight performance on The Velvet Rope Tour, with The Baltimore Sun saying "her singing on "Black Cat" was commanding enough to hold its own against the wailing electric guitar." On the All for You Tour, Jackson wore a geisha/Wonder Woman outfit during a segment inspired by Chinatown. For the Rock Witchu Tour, Jackson performed a "fiery rendition" with guitarist Dave Navarro appearing on screens, "contributing pealing licks via a recorded video." It was considered the "hardest-rocking song of the night", bolstered by its "blistering riffs." In a review of Number Ones, Up Close and Personal, the Philippine Daily Inquirer stated, "'Black Cat' engulfed us in rock 'n' roll bliss, the band's lead guitarist shredding the notes while Janet knelt and undulated in front of him." Jackson also included the song on her 2015–2016 Unbreakable World Tour; according to George Varga of The San Diego Union-Tribune, "when she ripped into such classics as [...] 'Black Cat' and the climactic 'Rhythm Nation', she soared like a champion". Jackson also included the song on her 2019 Las Vegas residency Janet Jackson: Metamorphosis.

== Legacy ==
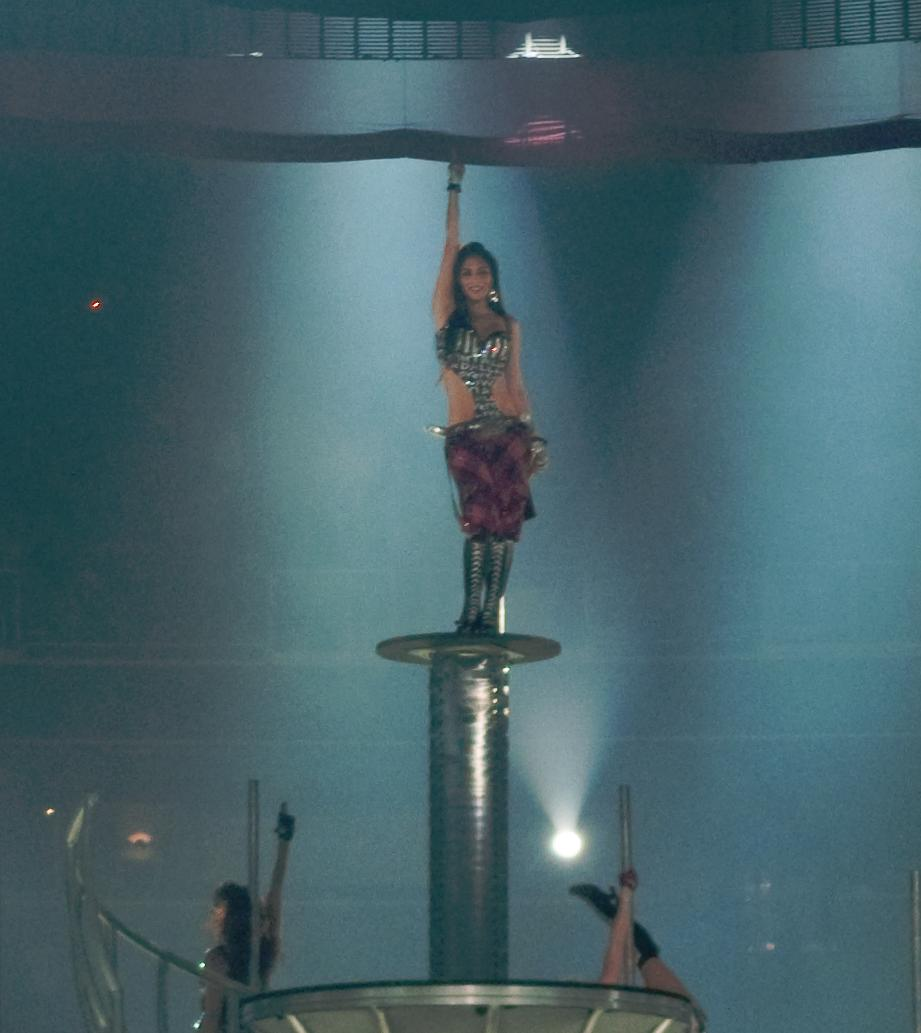
Several songs on Nicole Scherzinger's debut album were inspired by "Black Cat."

"Black Cat" has influenced the production of numerous songs and inspired various artists to foray into the rock genre. Record producer RedOne was inspired by "Black Cat" for several songs on Nicole Scherzinger's debut album, Killer Love. Jessica Simpson considers the song an influence, saying "Janet's music rocks", citing "Black Cat" and "Rhythm Nation" specifically, adding "Janet affects my music." Fefe Dobson said the song was a primary influence for her third album Joy, saying "I heard Janet's 'Black Cat,' with its rock guitar riff. That's what this album reflects." Dobson explained, “Black Cat” incorporated a bunch of different types of music into one song. It was pop. It was punk. It was rock and roll. And I am all of those things. I think it hit me as a kid really hard, because I love to experience a fusion of musical genres." Tejano singer Selena cited Jackson among her main influences, with her husband and guitarist Chris Pérez stating, "Selena especially loved Jackson's song 'Black Cat' ... I can't even count how many times Selena and I listened to that single." Solange Knowles also called the song an influence, saying, "I remember I had a solo dance for a song of hers called 'Black Cat', and that was the start of my Janet love affair", wearing a black unitard and cat ears. Rihanna's single "Rockstar 101" was considered reminiscent of Jackson's pursuit, and she also worked with Nuno Bettencourt, the guitarist on the single edit of "Black Cat", during the song's live performances. Alanis Morissette's transition from dance-pop into alternative rock with Jagged Little Pill was partially inspired by the song, with author Paul Cantin writing, "She may have been a fan of dance music, but when the band covered Janet Jackson's rock-flavoured song 'Black Cat', her bandmates could see how eager she was to let go." Singer-songwriter BJ the Chicago Kid cited Jackson's performance on the Rhythm Nation World Tour as an inspiration to enter the music industry, saying "I remember seeing the Black Cat tour with Janet Jackson as a kid. They were wheeling a cage out on stage and there's a black panther in there! I'm like a kid in the photographers pit like, 'Woah.' She's beautiful and I'm seeing a real live fucking cat.. [I] would later be signed to Motown Records and do the same thing. So they were instilling and pouring into my soul the whole time."

=== In popular culture ===
"Black Cat" is included in the multi-console video game Band Hero. Dance troupe Super Cr3w performed a routine to "Black Cat" on an episode of MTV series America's Best Dance Crew titled "Janet Jackson Challenge." The song was used in the action film The Taking of Beverly Hills and sampled during a performance in the Bollywood film, Koi Mere Dil Se Poochhe (2002). It was referenced by Ataf Khawaja in Ida Corr's "U Make Me Wanna." In 2010, it was also referenced in W.K. Stratton's novel Boxing Shadows. Wrestler Rick Rude's WCW theme "Big Brother" was inspired by the song. Jacqueline Moore used the song as her theme while in the United States Wrestling Association. It was also used as the theme for the mascot of the Indiana Pacers.

== Cover versions ==
Christina Aguilera performed "Black Cat" on the fifth season of The Voice with contestants Jacquie Lee and Matthew Schuler. Britney Spears covered "Black Cat", along with "Nasty", during her ...Baby One More Time Tour. Finnish metal band Warmen covered the song on their fourth album Japanese Hospitality, featuring vocals by Jonna Kosonen. Swedish singer Nanne Grönvall covered the song on her sixth album My Rock Favourites. Roz Ellington recorded a funk rock version for her debut album, Touched. Alanis Morissette performed live covers of "Black Cat" while part of Canadian band The New York Fries. Shirley Kwan recorded a Cantonese version for her album Lost in the Night. Sally Yeh also covered the song in Cantonese In 1991. Canadian rock singer Lee Aaron has been known to perform the song in concerts, as recently as 2023.

"Black Cat" was performed on the third season of The Voice of Germany. Markéta Poulícková performed the song on Hlas Česko Slovenska 2012, the Czech version of The Voice. Vocal group Shackles covered the song on the first season of X Factor Norway. Ejay Day covered the song on the American Idols LIVE! Tour 2002.

Ally Venable covers the song on her Money & Power album https://www.youtube.com/watch?v=TjYX_BCWuNY&list=RDTjYX_BCWuNY&start_radio=1

== Accolades ==
"Black Cat" received a Grammy Award nomination for Best Female Rock Vocal Performance at the 33rd Annual Grammy Awards, making Jackson the second artist (after Donna Summer) in history to receive Grammy nominations spanning five genres (pop, dance, rock, rap, and R&B). The song also made her the first female artist to have a Grammy nominated number-one song which they had solely written and produced. It won a BMI Pop Award for Most Played Song. Upon reaching number one on the Billboard Hot 100, it also made Jackson the first solo artist to achieve two number one hits in the nineties.

== Track listings ==
Select releases include "The 1814 Megamix" as its B-side. Remixed by Alan Coulthard, it includes snippets of "Alright", "Escapade", "Rhythm Nation", and "Miss You Much."

- Canadian cassette single (75021 1477 4)
1. Video Mix/Long Solo – 4:48
2. Funky 7-inch – 4:41
3. 3 Snaps Up 7-inch – 4:24
4. "The 1814 Megamix" (Full Version) – 7:24
5. 3 Snaps Up Dub – 6:12
- Australian 7-inch single (390548-7)
1. Edit Version – 4:30
2. "Lonely" – 4:59
- UK 7-inch single (AM 587)
1. Edit Version – 4:30
2. "The 1814 Megamix" (Edit) – 4:36
- UK 12-inch single (AMY587)
- UK 12-inch single (AMX587) (limited edition with badge and four postcards)
1. 3 Snaps Up 12-inch – 7:31
2. Album Version – 4:50
3. "The 1814 Megamix" (Full Version) – 7:24
- German CD single (390 572-2)
1. Edit Version – 4:30
2. "The 1814 Megamix" (Full Version) – 7:24
3. 3 Snaps Up 12-inch – 7:31
- US 12-inch single (SP-12348)
- Australian 12-inch single (390 548-1, 390 548-1)
1. Funky 12-inch – 5:45
2. Funky 7-inch – 4:41
3. Video Mix / Short Solo – 4:31
4. 3 Snaps Up 12-inch – 7:31
5. 3 Snaps Up 7-inch – 4:24
6. 3 Snaps Up Dub – 6:12
- German CD maxi single (397 098-2)
1. Edit Version – 4:30
2. Video Mix / Short Solo – 4:31
3. Video Mix / Long Solo – 4:48
4. Guitar Mix (with Vernon Reid) – 4:48
5. 3 Snaps Up 7-inch – 4:24
6. Funky 7-inch – 4:41
7. 3 Snaps Up 12-inch – 7:31
8. Funky 12-inch – 5:45
9. 3 Snaps Up Dub – 6:12
10. "The 1814 Megamix" (Full Version) – 7:24
- Japanese CD single (PCCY-10144)
1. Video Mix / Short Solo – 4:31
2. Video Mix / Long Solo – 4:48
3. Edit Version – 4:30
4. Guitar Mix (with Vernon Reid) – 4:48
5. 3 Snaps Up 7-inch – 4:24
6. Funky 7-inch – 4:41
7. 3 Snaps Up 12-inch – 7:31
8. Funky 12-inch – 5:45
9. 3 Snaps Up Dub – 6:12
- Japanese 3-inch CD single (PCDY-10017)
1. Video Mix / Short Solo – 4:31
2. Guitar Mix (with Vernon Reid) – 4:48

== Charts ==
=== Weekly charts ===
Weekly chart performance for "Black Cat"
| Chart (1990) | Peak position |
|---|---|
| Australia (ARIA) | 6 |
| Belgium (Ultratop 50 Flanders) | 33 |
| Canada Retail Singles (The Record) | 9 |
| Canada Contemporary Hit Radio (The Record) | 3 |
| Canada Top Singles (RPM) | 4 |
| Europe (Eurochart Hot 100 Singles) | 39 |
| Finland (Suomen virallinen lista) | 4 |
| Germany (GfK) | 34 |
| Iceland (Íslenski Listinn Topp 10) | 10 |
| Ireland (IRMA) | 11 |
| Luxembourg (Radio Luxembourg) | 11 |
| Netherlands (Dutch Top 40) | 21 |
| Netherlands (Single Top 100) | 18 |
| New Zealand (Recorded Music NZ) | 25 |
| Norway (VG-lista) | 5 |
| South Africa (Mediaguide) | 3 |
| Sweden (Sverigetopplistan) | 16 |
| Switzerland (Schweizer Hitparade) | 10 |
| UK Singles (Official Charts) | 15 |
| US Billboard Hot 100 | 1 |
| US Dance Club Songs (Billboard) | 17 |
| US Hot R&B/Hip-Hop Songs (Billboard) | 10 |
| US Crossover Radio Airplay: Top 40/Rock (Billboard) | 9 |
| US Cash Box Top 100 | 2 |
| US Contemporary Hit Radio (Radio & Records) | 1 |
| US Urban (Radio & Records) | 14 |
| Zimbabwe (Zimbabwean Singles Chart) | 6 |

=== Year-end charts ===
Year-end chart performance for "Black Cat"
| Chart (1990) | Position |
|---|---|
| Australia (ARIA) | 75 |
| Canada Top Singles (RPM) | 65 |
| Norway Autumn Period (VG-lista) | 9 |
| Sweden (Topplistan) | 64 |
| US Billboard Hot 100 | 59 |
| US Cash Box Top 100 | 40 |
| US Contemporary Hit Radio (Radio & Records) | 32 |

== Certifications ==
Certifications for "Black Cat"
| Region | Certification | Certified units/sales |
|---|---|---|
| Australia (ARIA) | Gold | 35,000^{^} |
| United States (RIAA) | Gold | 500,000^{^} |
^{^} Shipments figures based on certification alone.

== Release history ==
Release dates and formats for "Black Cat"
| Region | Date | Format(s) | Label(s) | Ref(s). |
|---|---|---|---|---|
| Australia | June 25, 1990 | 7-inch vinyl; CD; cassette | A&M; Polydor | |
| United Kingdom | August 28, 1990 | 7-inch vinyl; 12-inch vinyl; CD; cassette | A&M | |
| United Kingdom | September 3, 1990 | 12-inch vinyl with postcards | A&M | |
| Australia | September 10, 1990 | 12-inch vinyl | A&M; Polydor | |
| Japan | September 21, 1990 | Mini-CD; maxi-CD | A&M | |

== See also ==
- List of Billboard Hot 100 number-one singles of 1990
