= Number Ones, Up Close and Personal =

2011 concert tour by Janet Jackson

- Tour by Janet Jackson
- Associated album: Number Ones
- Start date: February 4, 2011
- End date: December 5, 2011
- Legs: 8
- No. of shows: 81
- Box office: US$26.5 million ($37.93 million in 2025 dollars)

Janet Jackson concert chronology
- Rock Witchu Tour (2008); Number Ones, Up Close and Personal (2011); Unbreakable World Tour (2015–16)

Number Ones, Up Close and Personal World Tour was the sixth concert tour by American recording artist Janet Jackson. It showcased her sophomore compilation album, Number Ones and visited Asia, North America, Europe, Australia, and Africa. Jackson traveled to thirty-five different cities selected by fans, one chosen for each of her number one hits. The tour took an organic and intimate approach, excluding the elaborate theatrics and pyrotechnics her concerts have become infamous for, focusing on her musicality and choreography. Jackson explained the tour to be "different from anything I have ever done", adding, "These concerts are not about special effects. This is a love affair between me and those of you who have supported me and my work for all these years." Jackson dedicated an individual song to the audience during every show to commemorate each city.

The show's intimate aura was praised among critics, many commending Jackson's showmanship in contrast to her more recent contemporaries. The majority of the tour had completely sold out, notably two shows in Sydney, Australia, which sold out within fifteen minutes, in addition to Los Angeles, which sold in under ten minutes, and three shows in London. The tour achieved several attendance records, among the most attended concerts in the Reliant Stadium's history and top selling shows of the year in the Philippines. It had also broken the gross for a single performance at a venue located in Tampa, Florida, surpassing a record previously held by Mariah Carey. Private shows were held in Singapore, Shanghai, London, and Hertfordshire, the latter venue compensating Jackson a substantial amount to perform. An exclusive concert was also held at the Liaisons Au Louvre II Charity Gala in Paris, France, making Jackson the first female pop artist in history to perform at the I. M. Pei glass pyramid. Professional footage of shows in Singapore and London were filmed but have not been released. Entertainers such as Taylor Swift, Joe Jonas, Siti Nurhaliza, Rachel Stevens, Park Jung-Min, and British boy band JLS were reported to attend the tour.

Selected dates of the tour's first North American leg from March to April 2011 had ranked forty-fifth in Pollstar's Top 50 Worldwide Tours, earning $16 million. At the end of 2011, the tour placed 62nd on Pollstar's "Top 100 Worldwide Tours", earning $26.5 million from 71 shows worldwide.

== Background ==
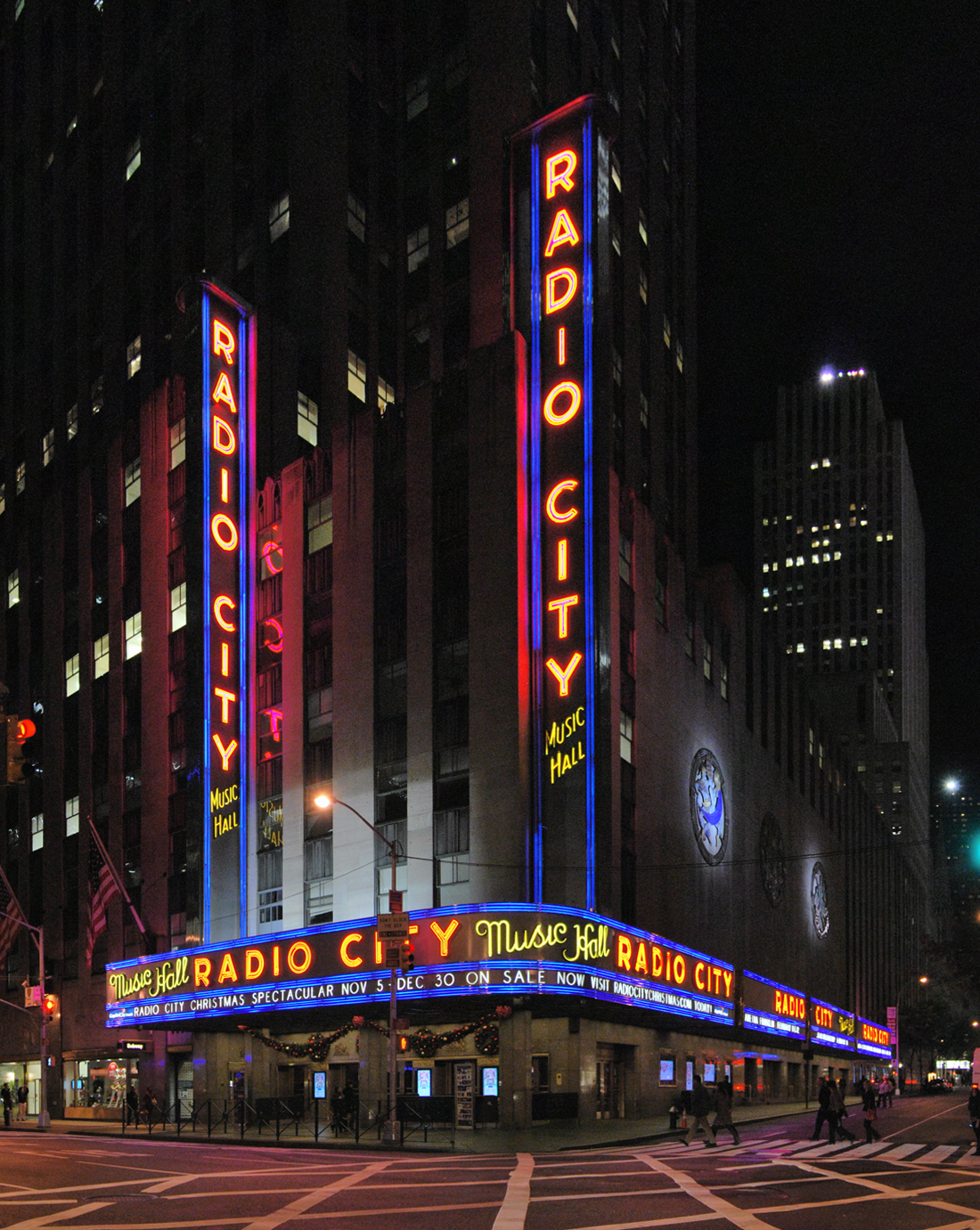
Jackson was inspired to pursue the tour when performing a private concert at Radio City Music Hall.

Several years prior, Jackson embarked on her first tour in nearly seven years, the Rock Witchu Tour. It faced adversities due to an illness revealed as severe vertigo, which had also affected several promotional appearances during the release of her eighth studio album, Discipline. Jackson planned to tour Asia during that time, however, dates were postponed due to the 2009 economic crisis. Jackson intended to tour in support of her Number Ones album but was halted by numerous circumstances, including filming Why Did I Get Married Too? and For Colored Girls. At the same time, she penned her first book, True You and suffered the death of her brother, Michael Jackson. In 2010, Jackson returned to performing at the Essence Music Festival in New Orleans, Louisiana. Jackson's performance was praised by both media and spectators, also breaking Beyoncé's attendance record at the Louisiana Superdome.

Upon performing a private concert at New York's Radio City Music Hall, she became inspired to tour with an intimate show. In November, Jackson posted a video on her official website announcing details of her upcoming tour. She deemed it the "largest world tour I've ever done" while revealing its concept of an intimate gathering with fans. She exclusively performed her catalog of number ones hits from charts such as Billboard's Hot 100, Top 40 Mainstream, R&B Songs, and Hot Dance Club Songs, as well as Japan's Oricon, Canadian Singles, and various international charts in Europe and Australia. Jackson performed in 35 cities, each show offering something different in terms of her performance. Fans were to vote on cities via her official website. She honored 20 people who performed service in their community with the "20 Under 20" contest and dedicated one hit to each city during every show. In December, Jackson announced the first date in Wan Chai, Hong Kong.

This tour will be different from the tours I've done in the past. In the way that I perform music[ally] will be exclusively from my 35 number one hits [in] 35 cities. These concerts will be different from anything I have ever done", Jackson said. "I will be as up close and personal as possible. These concerts are not about special effects. This is a love affair between me and those of you who have supported me and my work for all these years. I’ll be singing and dancing from my heart. The music will all be songs that you’ve made number ones for me. Let's go!

In April, Jackson extended the tour's North American and European legs into the fall due to massive sellouts. She also extended the tour into Australia, Africa, and South America. The tour was sponsored by Universal Music and fashion label Blackglama.

== Development ==
Jackson desired to perform an organic show without the use of theatrics and pyrotechnics, selecting venues allowing her to be intimate with fans. It focused on Jackson's artistry through singing and choreography, using an "unplugged" concept. Jackson explained, "I was in New York performing [a private show] at Radio City Music Hall. It was so much fun to look into the audience and see the eyes, smiles and energy of each person. I was singing and dancing and all I could think was, 'This is how I will perform my next tour'. Up close and personal. Giving my fans something we hadn't shared before." The show is divided into multiple segments, each focusing on a specific theme within the song's lyrical content to express an individual storyline. Jackson stated, "I am always looking to grow as an artist. When creating this tour, I wanted to tell a specific story in each section of the show. I am having fun looking at these songs and seeing what I can do with them and let them inspire me." Various costume and set list changes were made frequently throughout the tour, saying "I am a very creative person, so I love to experiment. [...] I have changed some of the costumes, added songs and videos to the line up. I love to create so it has been a lot of fun." Jackson did many meet and greets with fans and allowed them to give specific input into the show. Regarding their contributions, Jackson said, "I am so fortunate that my fans, no matter where they are, are so loyal. They give me so much love and I am excited to return mine to them."

== Concert synopsis ==
The tour took an intimate and organic approach, focusing on Jackson's musicality and showmanship in dedication to her fans. Each segment focuses on a different theme based on the song's lyrical content. The show began with a video introduction of Jackson explaining its concept. After this, a music video of the individual song dedicated to the current city is shown. She enters from the back of the audience flaunting a "scythe-edged" haircut in a grey catsuit to perform opening number "The Pleasure Principle", moving throughout the venue's centerpiece while interacting with the crowd. Upon reaching the stage, she performed "Control", "What Have You Done for Me Lately", and "Feedback" before transitioning to "You Want This", "Alright", and "Miss You Much" replicating each song's signature dance moves. Jackson smashes her way into "Nasty" ending the first part of the show. A film reel of highlights from Jackson's acting career was played during a brief interlude, including scenes from Good Times, Poetic Justice, The Nutty Professor II: The Klumps, and Why Did I Get Married Too?. She reappeared in a diamond-encrusted lavender gown and sat on a stool in center stage to perform several unplugged ballads. The set began with "Nothing" and "Come Back to Me" before closing with "Let's Wait Awhile" and "Again", briefly pausing to allow the audience to sing several verses in their entirety. "Janet's Image", a second video montage consisting of Jackson's most iconic photographs is shown before she returned in a sleeveless black vest. The third set focused on upbeat love songs, beginning with "Doesn't Really Matter" and leading into "Love Will Never Do (Without You)", "When I Think of You", and "All for You." After a slight pause, she sang "That's the Way Love Goes." The band played an instrumental version of "What About" during a costume break. Upon emerging, Jackson segued through a rock-influenced portion in a black jacket, performing "Black Cat" and "If", emulating its music video's iconic choreography. The set closed with "Scream" and "Rhythm Nation." Following a final intermission, Jackson and her dancers reappeared in matching white outfits for the show's encore. Her then-most recent number one hit "Make Me" lead the set. followed by the show's finale, "Together Again." Throughout the song, childhood images of her with Michael Jackson appeared on screens in tribute to his death. The show ended with Jackson speaking to the crowd and waving goodbye as she exits the stage. "All Nite (Don't Stop)", "Runaway", "Call on Me", "I Get Lonely", "Diamonds", "The Best Things in Life Are Free", "Throb", "Go Deep" and "When We Oooo" were performed on selected dates.

== Critical reception ==
The tour was met with positive reviews. The Jakarta Post wrote Jackson put together "a well-crafted performance, peppered with cool and familiar choreographies combined with an impressive multimedia backdrop." Serene Goh of The Straits Times wrote, "She was theatrical before Lady Gaga, racy before Rihanna and bootylicious before Beyoncé ... Jackson, now 44, brought to the stage a different sensibility, a pared-down set, fewer back-up dancers and less distraction." Amy Verner of The Globe and Mail stated Jackson "proved that she no longer needs elaborate stage sets or pyrotechnics to captivate her fans." Verner concluded, "Seeing Jackson in concert is less about her vocal range than her command of countless choreographed moves to catchy songs that you find you know the words to. She's in her element performing live, transitioning smoothly from fierce and aggressive to sweet and giggly." Saeed Saeed of The National praised it as "a masterclass in how to deliver a pop performance", delivering a mixture of "fan favourites and new material." The "fast moving and slickly produced" show was thought to demonstrate her longevity, "reflecting her eclectic muse from pop, R&B to rock and dance."

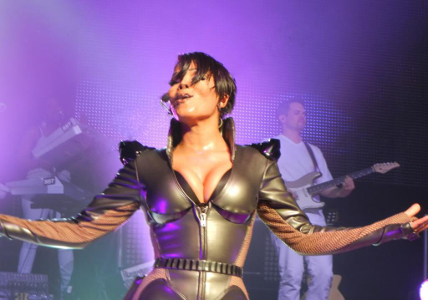
Jackson performing on tour.

Joe Lawler of the DesMoines Register called the show "a Janet Jackson sampler", adding "Ms. Jackson clearly knows how to work a crowd, and they showered her with affection." Lawler emphasized, "A number of artists have been tagged with the honorific "Queen of Pop" title over the years, but Jackson's longevity and body of work make it clear that she is worthy of it." Vaughn Schoonmaker of MTV News stated "Often imitated, never duplicated, Janet Jackson's outbursts of meticulous choreography, sassy exclamations and smoldering gazes into the audience kept them on their feet for the entire two-hour set... we can expect to see this singing and dancing pop legend shine far into the future." Brad Wete of Entertainment Weekly praised Jackson's "crisp choreography" and vocals as "strong all evening", ranging from "both feathery and gruff." Wete added, "Statistically, the fact that she's one of the most successful artists of the last 25 years is unquestionable. She's in a class with Madonna, though not mentioned as much." Thomas Conner of Chicago Sun-Times observed the tour's set list suggested "a total that once again equals international megastar."

Liz Tracy of Miami New Times called Jackson "as strong and feminine as ever", contrasting with her "soft-spoken, seemingly genteel" persona offstage, becoming "a sassy little powerhouse who is every straight (and gay) man's wet dream." Tracy concluded, "Jackson needn't prove herself. She is a 35-hit wonder who has stayed sexy yet powerful, smart yet vulnerable. Baby-faced, industry-perfect pop stars will grow old whether or not they grow up. Jackson is the example of how to do it with grace even when things go horribly wrong." Jane Stevenson of Winnipeg Sun called the show "a scaled-down, fast-paced, crowd-pleasing, wall-to-wall hits package", heralding its medleys, "sexy, glamorous costumes", and choreographed dance moves. Annabel Ross of Australia's The Age called the tour "a walloping reminder of just how many hits she's produced, jamming 30-odd chart-topping singles into two hours." Ross added, "Jackson's trailblazing talent – she still dances circles around Beyoncé and Britney – deserves to be celebrated in its own right." In a review for Sydney's Everguide, Ross praised the show as "one of the best pop performances I’ve ever seen", commending its "substance and stripped-back style." Jackson was noted to abandon her sex-driven image, performing with "agy-defying ease and energy." Jackson's voice was heralded as "nothing to sniff at – that pristine, unmistakable Jackson coo never faltered as she tore through hit after hit." In comparison to her recent contemporaries, Ross stated, "There was no hatching out of eggs, no fandangled props and light shows – just good old-fashioned song and dance from one of the best movers in the business. Rihanna, Beyoncé, Britney – they ain’t got nothin’ on Damita Jo." The excerpt concluded, "Thank you, Janet, for being one of the best pop entertainers of the last century. Beyoncé et al. have some massive shoes to fill if they want to rock a show like you did last night – at any age."

James Reed of The Boston Globe commented, "[a]t 44, Jackson looks terrific ... She stayed in step with her dancers, and she was in strong voice and as seductive as ever." However, Reed called the show "a strange animal", questioning several hits being "shoehorned into brisk medleys." Ben Ratliff of The New York Times felt the show's best moments occurred during its third segment, with Jackson "relaxed and athletic", as well as "tension free." Chris Richards of The Washington Post praised the "laserlight precision" of Jackson's "delicate" voice, adding "if you paid to hear Jackson sing, you certainly got that. Not a single word appeared to be lip-synced." Richard also complimented her physically strenuous performance, stating "in a 21st-century popscape where concerts are driven by spectacle, we need to know that beneath all of the sci-fi costumes, strobe lights and Auto-Tune, we’re still witnessing a performance by the living, breathing, profusely sweating human being whose name is stamped on the tickets we just emptied our wallets for."

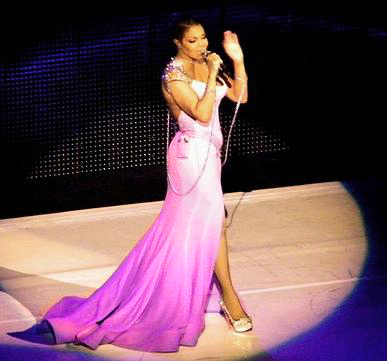
Jackson performing "Again" on tour.

Greg Kot of Chicago Tribune praised the "tightly-choreographed greatest hits show" as "the best Janet Jackson performance I’ve covered in 20-plus years." Jackson was thought to portray "the work of a still-vital artist determined to showcase her subtle strengths", considered its most crucial achievement. The show's standout renditions were thought to be "Alright", as Jackson "flung limbs in impossible directions", in addition to "I Get Lonely" and "Black Cat", which showcased Jackson "head-banging with rare violence." Kot commended Jackson's vocals, saying "her delicate touch conveyed an innocence and sweetness not often heard on the pop charts anymore. That's a unique legacy in pop; whereas the charts are often dominated by stridency, Jackson brought sensuality and understatement." Phil Villeneuve of FAB Magazine likened Jackson's appeal to Lady Gaga's, saying "If Gaga is Mother Monster, then Janet Jackson is Mother Lion. The woman defines fierce and she pounced on the stage." In particular, Villeneuve praised "the set list, the woman herself and the venue", noting "pitch-perfect sing-alongs" during the show's ballad segment. Her appearance was considered "what might be her sexiest", saying "she has booty to make your eyes pop and curves to get lost in, but everything was tight, in check and oozing confidence." Villeneuve added her outfits "gave off a dance-sergeant vibe that really worked." The show's frequent dance numbers were thought to display Jackson "at her best", clarifying "these numbers served as reminders that dancing is sometimes as important as the songs themselves." Pocholo Concepción of Philippine Daily Inquirer said Jackson "ruled the stage"; her wardrobe giving the impression of a "sci-fi thriller movie." Concepción also praised her "vocal sensitivity" and "unexpected" entrance through the middle of the audience. Victoria Barker of AsiaOne said Jackson "commanded attention", praising her rendition of "The Pleasure Principle" as "riveting ... hip-thrusting and gyrating included, drew enthusiastic cheers." Jackson's vocals were also commended; her performance of "Again" called "goosebump-inducing" which "ached gorgeously with just the right amount of emotion." An additional critique called it "an amazingly riveting stage performance" backed by "impeccable" choreography, showcasing tactics thought to "silence even the most fervent of her haters."

Gerrick D. Kennedy of the Los Angeles Times commended Jackson's showmanship, stating "While today's pop landscape of over-the-top divas like Beyoncé, Rihanna, Lady Gaga, Katy Perry and Britney Spears have become known for glitzy productions ... She placed the focus of her set squarely on showcasing her voice ... she sang live for the nearly two-hour show, a rarity in today's pop music—and the legendary complex footwork that marked her.. as pop royalty." Aidin Vaziri of the San Francisco Chronicle declared the show affirmed "her legacy as pop royalty", saying, "Jackson threw her body full force into the songs." In reviewing her performance in London, Neil McCormick of The Daily Telegraph praised Jackson's "retained vocal tone and physical fitness" as "impressive", also saying "her voice still high, soft and girlish, her body curvy but firm and up to the demands of aerobic workout style dance routines." Joanna Chaundy of The Independent wrote, "Watching Janet Jackson play such a prestigious venue, one that conveys a sense of intimacy despite its size, is a pleasure in itself." Alexis Petridis of The Guardian said, "Jackson can still sing and dance up a storm", concluding "if she wanted to remind people how commanding a presence she can be, she's done her job."

== Commercial reception ==
The tour's entire box office earnings were not publicly reported, including sales from Europe, Australia, Asia, and its second North American leg. Selected reported dates of the tour's first North American leg from March to April 2011 had ranked forty-fifth in Pollstar's Top 50 Worldwide Tours, earning $16 million. Billboard ranked it fourth among the year's "Hottest Tours."

=== Accolades and records ===
Jackson was announced to be the fastest-selling single artist concert of the year. The majority of the tour had completely sold out, including three dates in New York, Chicago, and London, multiple shows in Los Angeles, Toronto, Sydney, Washington, D.C. and Atlantic City, as well as single dates in Berlin, Atlanta, Seattle, Santa Barbara, and various others. Jackson also played three sold-out shows at London's Royal Albert Hall. Two shows in Sydney, Australia sold out within fifteen minutes, and Los Angeles had sold in under ten minutes. Upon the tour's announcement, Jackson became the second most-searched item on the internet on multiple search engines. Ninety-six percent of the tour's pre-sale tickets were sold within the first day. The tour achieved several attendance records, including breaking the gross for a single performance at a venue in Tampa, Florida, surpassing a record previously held by Mariah Carey. The tour's show at the Reliant Stadium in Houston, Texas was the twentieth most attended concert in the venue's history, being two thousand away from the venue's highest attendance record at the time. Jackson's show at the Santa Barbara Bowl was among the venue's fastest sell-outs, prompting sponsors to add additional cities to the tour. Jackson notably performed for a massive crowd in Abu Dhabi; The Khaleej Times reporting "thousands of pop fans flocked to the Yas Arena on Thursday night to see the legendary Janet Jackson perform." Jackson was the year's sixth most successful touring act in the Philippines, ahead of artists such as Miley Cyrus, Maroon 5, Bruno Mars, and the Black Eyed Peas. Private shows were held in Singapore, Shanghai, and London. The Deutsche Bank reportedly compensated Jackson millions to provide a forty-five-minute show for their clients at The Grove in Hertfordshire, England. An exclusive concert was also held at The Louvre during the Liaisons Au Louvre II Charity Gala event in Paris, France, making Jackson the first female pop singer to perform at the I. M. Pei glass pyramid. Funds from the benefit raised contributions for the restoration of iconic artwork. Director Henri Loyrette stated, "Janet Jackson is one of the world's greatest artistic treasures. Accordingly, we are profoundly honored, and believe it most fitting, that her performance in the Louvre Museum will be yet another masterpiece captured under our glorious glass pyramid." The prior year, Jackson had sold out the Louisiana Superdome while headlining the 2010 Essence Music Festival, breaking Beyoncé's attendance record at the venue. Jackson also caused the Festival's first waiting list, with additional seats sold and erected behind the stage.

Entertainers such as Taylor Swift, Rachel Stevens, Siti Nurhaliza, Joe Jonas, Park Jung-Min, Alesha Dixon, Jordin Sparks, Cesar Purisima, and British boy band JLS were reported to attend the tour.

== Recordings ==
Professional footage of two dates filmed at London's Royal Albert Hall has not been released. The tour's London show was initially planned to be released to Vevo in addition to a possible DVD release. Professional footage of "Feedback" filmed during a private show at the Hard Rock Hotel Singapore was uploaded to Jackson's official YouTube channel. In 2020, a production company from Singapore shared footage of the concert on their YouTube channel, marking the first full professionally filmed show to be released in some form of this tour. Not long after, a clip of Janet performing "When We Oooo" from All for You during the Las Vegas stop in April surfaced on Kathy Ireland's Vimeo page.

== Set list ==
This set list is representative of the performance on April 14, 2011. It does not represent all concerts for the duration of the tour.

1. "Video Introduction" (contains elements from "Control", "Feedback", "Nasty", "So Much Betta", and "Miss You Much")
2. "The Pleasure Principle" / "Control" / "What Have You Done for Me Lately"
3. "Feedback"
4. "You Want This"
5. "Alright"
6. "Miss You Much"
7. "Nasty"
8. "Janet's Films" (Video Interlude)
9. "Nothing"
10. "Come Back to Me"
11. "Let's Wait Awhile"
12. "Again"
13. "Janet's Images" (Video Interlude) (contains elements from "Rope Burn", "Any Time, Any Place", "Got 'til It's Gone", "Go Deep", "What's It Gonna Be?!" and "Doesn't Really Matter")
14. "Doesn't Really Matter"
15. "Escapade" / "Love Will Never Do (Without You)" / "When I Think of You"
16. "All For You"
17. "All Nite (Don't Stop)"
18. "That's the Way Love Goes"
19. "I Get Lonely"
20. "What About" (Instrumental Interlude)
21. "Black Cat"
22. "If"
23. "Scream" / "Rhythm Nation"

Encore

24. "In Complete Darkness" (Video Interlude)
25. "Diamonds"
26. "The Best Things in Life Are Free"
27. "Make Me" (contains elements from "Throb")
28. "Together Again"

== Shows ==
List of concerts, showing date, city, country, venue, tickets sold, number of available tickets and amount of gross revenue
Date	City	Country	Venue	Attendance	Revenue
Asia
February 4, 2011	Manila	Philippines	PICC Plenary Hall	—N/a	—N/a
February 7, 2011	Singapore		Singapore Indoor Stadium	—N/a	—N/a
February 9, 2011	Jakarta	Indonesia	BSJCC Plenary Hall	—N/a	—N/a
February 14, 2011	Hong Kong		HKCEC Hall 5BC	—N/a	—N/a
February 18, 2011	Taipei	Taiwan	TWTC Nangang Exhibition Hall	—N/a	—N/a
North America
March 3, 2011	Hidalgo	United States	State Farm Arena	—N/a	—N/a
March 4, 2011	Houston	United States	Reliant Stadium	—N/a	—N/a
March 7, 2011	Chicago	United States	Chicago Theatre	10,403 / 10,403	$1,350,916
March 8, 2011	Chicago	United States	Chicago Theatre	10,403 / 10,403	$1,350,916
March 9, 2011	Chicago	United States	Chicago Theatre	10,403 / 10,403	$1,350,916
March 12, 2011	Toronto	Canada	Sony Centre for the Performing Arts	5,811 / 6,082	$742,062
March 13, 2011	Toronto	Canada	Sony Centre for the Performing Arts	5,811 / 6,082	$742,062
March 15, 2011	Boston	United States	Wang Theatre	3,477 / 3,477	$362,240
March 16, 2011	Uncasville	United States	Mohegan Sun Arena	5,043 / 5,106	$330,270
March 18, 2011	New York City	United States	Radio City Music Hall	17,661 / 17,661	$1,976,484
March 19, 2011	New York City	United States	Radio City Music Hall	17,661 / 17,661	$1,976,484
March 21, 2011	New York City	United States	Radio City Music Hall	17,661 / 17,661	$1,976,484
March 22, 2011	Washington, D.C.	United States	DAR Constitution Hall	5,589 / 5,662	$510,896
March 24, 2011	Washington, D.C.	United States	DAR Constitution Hall	5,589 / 5,662	$510,896
March 25, 2011	Atlantic City	United States	Borgata Event Center	4,372 / 4,964	$486,370
March 26, 2011	Atlantic City	United States	Borgata Event Center	4,372 / 4,964	$486,370
March 29, 2011	Atlanta	United States	Fox Theatre	4,395 / 4,395	$489,430
March 31, 2011	St. Louis	United States	Fabulous Fox Theatre	4,025 / 4,067	$308,177
April 2, 2011	Grand Prairie	United States	Verizon Theatre at Grand Prairie	5,957 / 5,957	$445,278
April 3, 2011	Austin	United States	Moody Theater	2,257 / 2,397	$256,173
April 5, 2011	Omaha	United States	Qwest Center Arena	5,054 / 5,054	$315,069
April 6, 2011	Denver	United States	Wells Fargo Theatre	4,704 / 4,848	$414,173
April 8, 2011	Phoenix	United States	Comerica Theatre	4,736 / 4,736	$321,300
April 9, 2011	Santa Barbara	United States	Santa Barbara Bowl	9,158 / 9,352	$741,144
April 10, 2011	Santa Barbara	United States	Santa Barbara Bowl	9,158 / 9,352	$741,144
April 14, 2011	Los Angeles	United States	Gibson Amphitheatre	17,014 / 17,163	$1,622,162
April 15, 2011	Los Angeles	United States	Gibson Amphitheatre	17,014 / 17,163	$1,622,162
April 16, 2011	Los Angeles	United States	Gibson Amphitheatre	17,014 / 17,163	$1,622,162
April 19, 2011	San Francisco	United States	Bill Graham Civic Auditorium	10,453 / 10,453	$926,756
April 20, 2011	San Francisco	United States	Bill Graham Civic Auditorium	10,453 / 10,453	$926,756
April 22, 2011	Las Vegas	United States	The Colosseum at Caesars Palace	12,361 / 12,361	$1,589,230
April 23, 2011	Las Vegas	United States	The Colosseum at Caesars Palace	12,361 / 12,361	$1,589,230
April 24, 2011	Las Vegas	United States	The Colosseum at Caesars Palace	12,361 / 12,361	$1,589,230
Europe
June 17, 2011	Oslo	Norway	Folketeatret	—N/a	—N/a
June 19, 2011	Copenhagen	Denmark	Falkoner Theatre	—N/a	—N/a
June 24, 2011	Berlin	Germany	Tempodrom	2,140 / 2,284	$225,528
June 26, 2011	Paris	France	L'Olympia	—N/a	—N/a
June 27, 2011	Paris	France	L'Olympia	—N/a	—N/a
June 30, 2011	London	England	Royal Albert Hall	—N/a	—N/a
July 2, 2011	London	England	Royal Albert Hall	—N/a	—N/a
July 3, 2011	London	England	Royal Albert Hall	—N/a	—N/a
July 5, 2011	Dublin	Ireland	Grand Canal Theatre	—N/a	—N/a
July 8, 2011	Monte Carlo	Monaco	Monte-Carlo Sporting	—N/a	—N/a
July 9, 2011	Monte Carlo	Monaco	Monte-Carlo Sporting	—N/a	—N/a
July 12, 2011	Barcelona	Spain	Plaça Major	—N/a	—N/a
North America
August 1, 2011	Montreal	Canada	Bell Centre	3,366 / 3,434	$330,025
August 3, 2011	Hamilton	Canada	Hamilton Place Theatre	1,582 / 2,073	$166,635
August 4, 2011	Bethel	United States	Bethel Woods Center for the Arts	4,054 / 4,250	$265,779
August 6, 2011	Holmdel Township	United States	PNC Bank Arts Center	5,543 / 6,275	$334,760
August 8, 2011	Upper Darby Township	United States	Tower Theater	2,372 / 2,924	$237,960
August 9, 2011	Portsmouth	United States	NTelos Wireless Pavilion	6,103 / 6,587	$245,190
August 11, 2011	Cincinnati	United States	PNC Pavilion	3,437 / 4,127	$292,979
August 12, 2011	Cleveland	United States	Jacobs Pavilion at Nautica	3,300 / 3,838	$249,176
August 14, 2011	Milwaukee	United States	Milwaukee Theatre	1,969 / 2,259	$241,037
August 16, 2011	Detroit	United States	Fox Theatre	—N/a	—N/a
August 19, 2011	Minneapolis	United States	Orpheum Theatre	2,579 / 2,579	$256,556
August 21, 2011	Des Moines	United States	Iowa State Fair Grandstand	8,877 / 11,467	$290,525
August 22, 2011	Kansas City	United States	Starlight Theatre	5,162 / 7,473	$292,443
August 26, 2011	Vancouver	Canada	Queen Elizabeth Theatre	—N/a	—N/a
August 29, 2011	Seattle	United States	McCaw Hall	2,816 / 2,976	$256,815
August 30, 2011	Portland	United States	Keller Auditorium	2,419 / 2,419	$153,029
September 1, 2011	Los Angeles	United States	Greek Theatre	5,808 / 5,808	$541,832
Asia
October 13, 2011	Abu Dhabi	United Arab Emirates	Du Arena	—N/a	—N/a
Australia
October 18, 2011	Perth	Australia	Burswood Theatre	2,247 / 2,247	$329,065
October 22, 2011	Adelaide	Australia	Festival Theatre	1,849 / 1,849	$233,826
November 2, 2011	Gold Coast	Australia	GCCEC Arena	3,878 / 3,878	$474,087
November 3, 2011 (Note: The November 3, 2011 concert in Melbourne, Australia was originally planned to take place at the State Theater on October 26, 27, and 29, 2011 but was postponed and combined into one date at the Rod Laver Arena due to scheduling conflicts.)	Melbourne	Australia	Rod Laver Arena	4,130 / 5,405	$777,493
November 5, 2011	Sydney	Australia	Sydney Opera House	4,285 / 4,285	$934,706
November 8, 2011	Sydney	Australia	Sydney Opera House	4,285 / 4,285	$934,706
Africa
November 11, 2011	Johannesburg	South Africa	The Teatro at Montecasino	—N/a	—N/a
November 12, 2011	Johannesburg	South Africa	The Teatro at Montecasino	—N/a	—N/a
November 15, 2011	Cape Town	South Africa	Grand Arena at Grand West Casino	—N/a	—N/a
North America
November 26, 2011	Las Vegas	United States	The Colosseum at Caesars Palace	—N/a	—N/a
December 1, 2011	Palm Springs	United States	McCallum Theatre	1,069 / 1,069	$312,100
December 4, 2011	Tampa	United States	Morsani Hall	2,548 / 2,548	$330,717
December 5, 2011	Miami Beach	United States	The Fillmore Miami Beach	—N/a	—N/a
Total				212,202 / 225,832	$20,960,393

== Cancelled shows ==
List of cancelled concerts, showing date, city, country, venue and reason for cancellation
Date	City	Country	Venue	Reason
August 17, 2011	Indianapolis	United States	Hoosier Lottery Grandstand	Stage collapse.
November 6, 2011	Sydney	Australia	Sydney Opera House	Vocal rest
December 9, 2011	São Paulo	Brazil	Credicard Hall	Scheduling conflict

== Personnel ==
- Show Director: Janet Jackson & Gil Duldulao
- Creative Director and Choreographer: Gil Duldulao
- Musical Director: Adam Blackstone
- Lighting/Video Designer: Vincent Foster
- Lighting Director: Tyler Elich
- Front of House Engineer: Kyle Hamilton
- Monitor Engineer: Michael "Woody" Dunwoody
- Personal Trainer: Anthony Martinez
- Costume Designer: Robert Henri Behar

=== Band ===
- Musical Director, Bass: Adam Blackstone
- Keyboards: Daniel Jones, Rex Salas
- Drums: Brian Frasier Moore
- Guitar: Clay Sears, Rick Barry
- Bass: Jae Deal
- Vocalists: Erin Stevenson, Jill Zadeh, Onitsha Shaw, Tiffany Palmer, Nicole Hurst

Dancers

- Gil Duldulao, Jr., Jillian Meyers, Laurel Thomson, Whyley Yoshimura, James Collins, Ramon Baynes, John-Paul "JP" San Pedro
