= Together Again (Janet Jackson song) =

1997 single by Janet Jackson

Single by Janet Jackson

from the album The Velvet Rope
- B-side: "Got 'til It's Gone" (Ummah Jay Dee's Revenge mix)
- Released: December 1, 1997
- Recorded: 1997
- Genre: Dance-pop; house
- Length: 5:01 (album version); 4:09 (single version)
- Label: Virgin
- Songwriters: Janet Jackson; James Harris III; Terry Lewis; René Elizondo Jr.
- Producers: Jimmy Jam and Terry Lewis; Janet Jackson

Janet Jackson singles chronology
| "Got 'til It's Gone" (1997) | "Together Again" (1997) | "I Get Lonely" (1998) |

Music video
- "Together Again" on YouTube

"Together Again" is a song by American singer Janet Jackson from her sixth studio album, The Velvet Rope (1997). It was written and produced by Jackson and Jimmy Jam and Terry Lewis, with additional writing by Jackson's then-husband René Elizondo Jr. It was released as the second single from the album in December 1997 by Virgin Records. Originally written as a ballad, the track was rearranged as an uptempo dance song. Jackson was inspired to write the song by her own private discovery of losing a friend to AIDS, as well as by a piece of fan mail she received from a young boy in England who had lost his father.

"Together Again" was well received by music critics, who praised the song's structure and Jackson's vocals. The single was a commercial success, topping the US Billboard Hot 100 for two weeks, as well as reaching number one on the Billboard Dance Club Play chart. The single was additionally certified platinum by the Recording Industry Association of America (RIAA). Worldwide, it peaked within the top five in many countries, such as Canada and the United Kingdom, and topped the charts in the Netherlands. The single sold six million copies worldwide.

Two music videos were produced for "Together Again". The video for the original, directed by Seb Janiak, shows Jackson and her dancers performing in a futuristic African paradise where people are seen living side by side with wild animals such as elephants, giraffes, and wildcats. Another video released for the 'Deeper Remix', was directed by Elizondo Jr. and shows Jackson in an apartment. Jackson performed "Together Again" in a number of occasions to promote The Velvet Rope, including at the American Music Awards and also on all of her tours since its release. It is also included in two of her greatest hits collections, Number Ones (2009) and Icon: Number Ones (2010).

== Background and release ==
"Together Again" was written as a tribute from Janet Jackson to a friend who had recently died of AIDS as well as AIDS victims and their families worldwide, as stated in the liner notes of The Velvet Rope (1997). Originally written as a ballad, the track was re-arranged as a dance and house song. Jackson was reportedly inspired to write the song from her own personal experience, as well as a piece of fan-mail she received from a young boy in England who had lost his father. According to Jimmy Jam, "it had a deep meaning for her because it was about a friend she lost to AIDS, but as with all her songs, she tries to make them apply in a general sense to anybody. The idea was to make it a joyous song musically".

The arrangement of the song was constructed in 30 minutes by Jam, Terry Lewis, and Jackson while in the recording studio. Once the melody was in place, Jackson finished writing the lyrics to the song. The song's sound was inspired by Donna Summer's song "Last Dance". Jackson told MTV News that her inspiration to write "Together Again" was "Runaway" by Nuyorican Soul, as the song reminded her of being in Studio 54 in New York when she was a child. "Runaway" gave Jackson a New York feel of disco and she wanted to do something like this. "Together Again" was released in the United Kingdom on December 1, 1997, as a 7-inch vinyl single, a 12-inch vinyl single, a CD single, and a cassette single. The following day, the song was released in the United States on all four formats plus a maxi-CD. In Japan, a CD single was issued later that month, on December 22.

== Composition ==
"Together Again"
Backed by dance and house beats, "Together Again" is lyrically a tribute from Jackson to a friend who had recently died from AIDS.

"Together Again" was written and produced by Jackson, Jimmy Jam and Terry Lewis, with additional writing by Jackson's then-husband, René Elizondo Jr. It is a dance and house track. According to the sheet music published at Musicnotes.com by EMI Music Publishing, the song is set in common time with a key of C major. Jackson's vocals range between A_{3} to D_{5}. The song has a moderate tempo of 123 beats per minute with the chord progression following the sequence of C–Em_{7}/B–Em_{7}(b_{5})/B_{b}–A_{7}–Dm_{9}–G_{13}–Dm_{9}–G_{13}. The bass line in the chorus descends according to the key until reaching the supertonic, after which it goes back to the dominant note set up the resolution, the repetition of the chorus or the interlude, which begins on the submedian. At the end of the second bridge, the song modulates up a minor third into E-flat major. Three versions of the song were released; the original dance version, the "Deep Remix", an R&B and hip-hop version, and the "Deeper Remix", which is an R&B and soul remake. Lyrically, it was described as an ode from Jackson to a friend who had died from AIDS. Larry Flick from Billboard noted its "tear-stained lyrics". Ernest Hardy of Rolling Stone described it as "unsullied pop bliss", saying "The bass-heavy house track "Together Again" showcases a poignant lead vocal, giving off a '60s soul/girl group vibe".

== Critical reception ==
"Together Again" received positive reviews. BBC deemed it a "thumping great hit, an old-fashioned piece of professional dance music, played perfectly". Larry Flick from Billboard magazine called it a "gorgeous disco ode to loved ones lost to AIDS-related illnesses". Jackson "has clearly been studying Donna Summer records, delivering a wonderfully nuanced performance that takes firm command of the track's vibrant house beat without sacrificing an ounce of emotion". Music critic Joey Guerra from The Daily Cougar stated, "Jackson pours her heart into "Together Again," which builds to an ecstatic house beat" which takes "a cue from the soaring melodies of '60s girl groups". He further commented that the song is "genuine happy-feeling. It sounds lame at first but pay attention to what she's singing; that vocal smile changes everything." A reviewer from Daily Record said, "Michael's wee sis has never sounded so good. Janet has found herself and her sound."

"She even makes a bid for gay icon status", wrote Neil McCormick in a review of The Velvet Rope for The Daily Telegraph, "delivering a diva-ish performance reminiscent of Diana Ross on 'Together Again'." J. D. Considine for Entertainment Weekly said that "the gently throbbing house beat beneath ”Together Again” keeps this tribute to a dead friend from sounding as lachrymose as it looks on the page." British magazine Music Week gave it four out of five, noting, "Contrasting sharply with the subtle groove of its predecessor, this is Janet at her most commercially accessible with a dance anthem full of big beats and a tasty hook." Jon Pareles from The New York Times described "Together Again" as "a creamy Diana Ross homage", noting that Jackson "deploys her small voice shrewdly" in it. Ian Hyland from Sunday Mirror said it is "some of the best club tunes she's ever done." Danyel Smith, while interviewing Jackson for Vibe in November 1997, elaborated that the song was a big, perfect ode to Donna Summer, and likened it to her songs "MacArthur Park" and "Last Dance".

== Chart performance ==
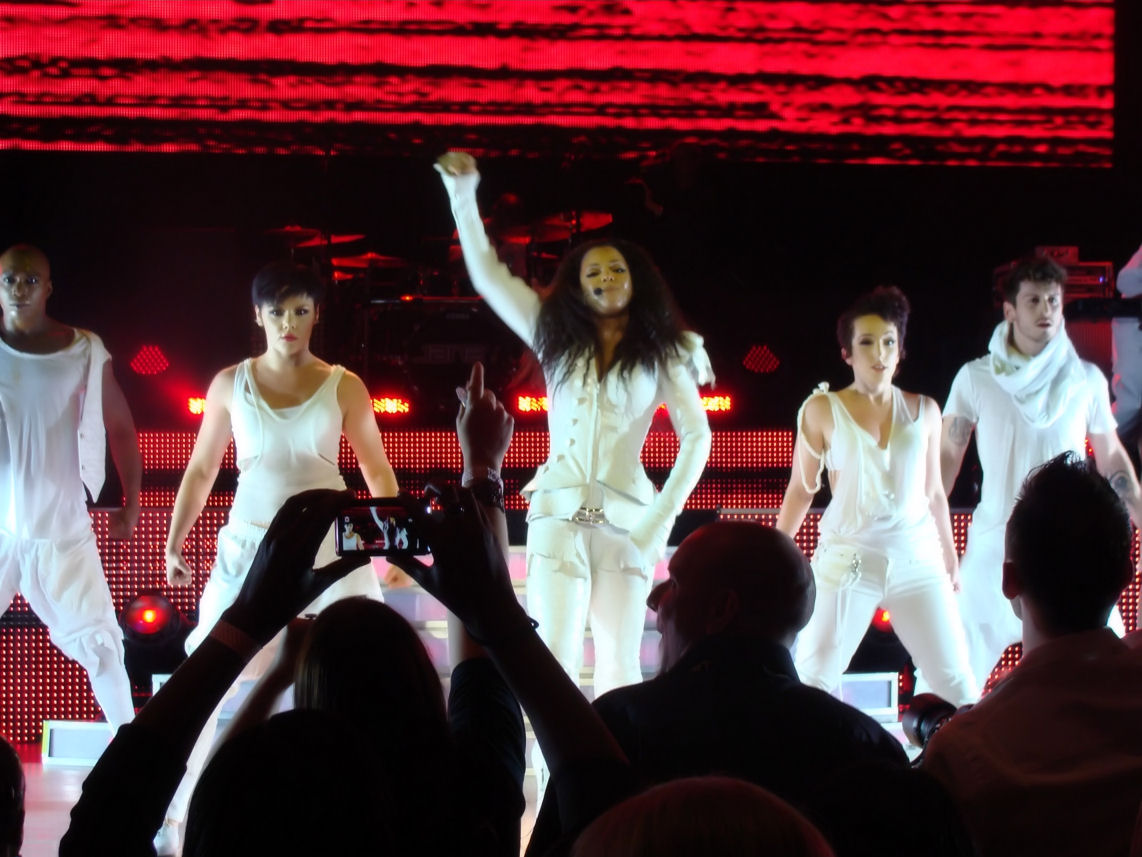
Jackson performing "Together Again" as the final song of her Number Ones, Up Close and Personal tour (2011)

"Together Again" debuted at number nine on the Billboard Hot 100 chart on the issue dated December 20, 1997, before becoming Jackson's eighth number-one single on January 31, 1998, spending two weeks at number one and a total of 46 weeks on the chart. It was Jackson's first single to reach number one in the US since "Again" in 1993. The song also peaked atop the Billboard Dance Club Play chart and reached number eight on the Billboard Hot R&B Singles chart. "Together Again" was certified platinum by the RIAA. In Canada, it peaked at number two on the RPM 100 Hit Tracks chart and reached number one on the RPM Dance chart. In Australasia, "Together Again" also experienced success. In Australia, it debuted at number 18 on the issue dated December 7, 1997, peaking at number four and staying on the ARIA Singles Chart for 25 weeks and was certified platinum by the Australian Recording Industry Association (ARIA) for 70,000 copies shipped. In New Zealand, it debuted at number 16 the week of December 21, 1997. On February 22, 1998, it reached its peak of number five, staying on the chart for ten weeks.

The song debuted and peaked at number four on the UK Singles Chart on December 13, 1997, falling to six the following week, three weeks later it returned to its peak of four, spending ten weeks in the top ten and 19 weeks inside the chart. It was certified platinum by the British Phonographic Industry (BPI), selling 600,000 units in the UK. It also spent a week atop the UK R&B Singles Chart and number six on the UK Dance Charts. It is Jackson's best-selling UK single. In Austria, it entered the singles chart at number 25, eventually peaking at number six and spending a total of fourteen weeks on the chart. In France, the song peaked at number two for ten weeks, and was certified platinum by the SNEP. In Germany, it peaked at number two for two weeks and remaining on the German Singles Chart for twenty-four weeks. It was certified platinum for 500,000 copies sold. In the Netherlands, "Together Again" entered the singles chart at number 61 during the week of December 13, 1997. It eventually peaked at number one, staying a total of thirty-two weeks on the chart. The Nederlandse Vereniging van Producenten en Importeurs van beeld- en geluidsdragers (NVPI) certified the single gold for shipment of 10,000 copies. On the Swiss Singles Chart dated January 11, 1998, "Together Again" debuted at number 13. After two weeks, it peaked at number two and was later certified gold by the International Federation of the Phonographic Industry (IFPI). A portion of the single's worldwide sales were donated by Jackson to the American Foundation for AIDS Research.

== Music videos ==
Jackson in the "Deeper Remix" video for "Together Again"

Two music videos were produced for "Together Again". The original version was directed by French photographer Seb Janiak and choreographed by Tina Landon. Jackson became interested in working on a music video with Janiak upon meeting him in Paris, although he had never directed a video before. She wanted something different for hairstyle for the video as she was getting bored and decided to dye it red, using wire to look like it was tree branches. It was filmed in Los Angeles, California, with her brother Michael's giraffe and elephant being used for the shoot; the giraffe got away during the shoot, but it was found afterwards.

Set in the Serengeti, Tanzania, the video depicts Jackson with mini red ponytails on her head. She and her dancers perform in a futuristic African-flavored paradise where people are seen living side by side with wild animals such as elephants, giraffes, and wildcats. At a point of the video, Jackson appears to be hugging another version of herself. Dan MacRae from ET Canada commented, "Janet is positively beaming as she participates in some lovely choreography and chills out with local wildlife". This version received a nomination for Best Dance Video at the 1998 MTV Video Music Awards.

Another music video was released for the "Deeper Remix". Directed by René Elizondo Jr., the video depicts Jackson in an apartment remembering a lost lover, with the singer commenting that "there's a butterfly that's throughout the video that represents the spirit" of this lover. Both videos are featured on the DVD edition of 2001's All for You and the 2004 video compilation From Janet to Damita Jo: The Videos.

== Live performances ==
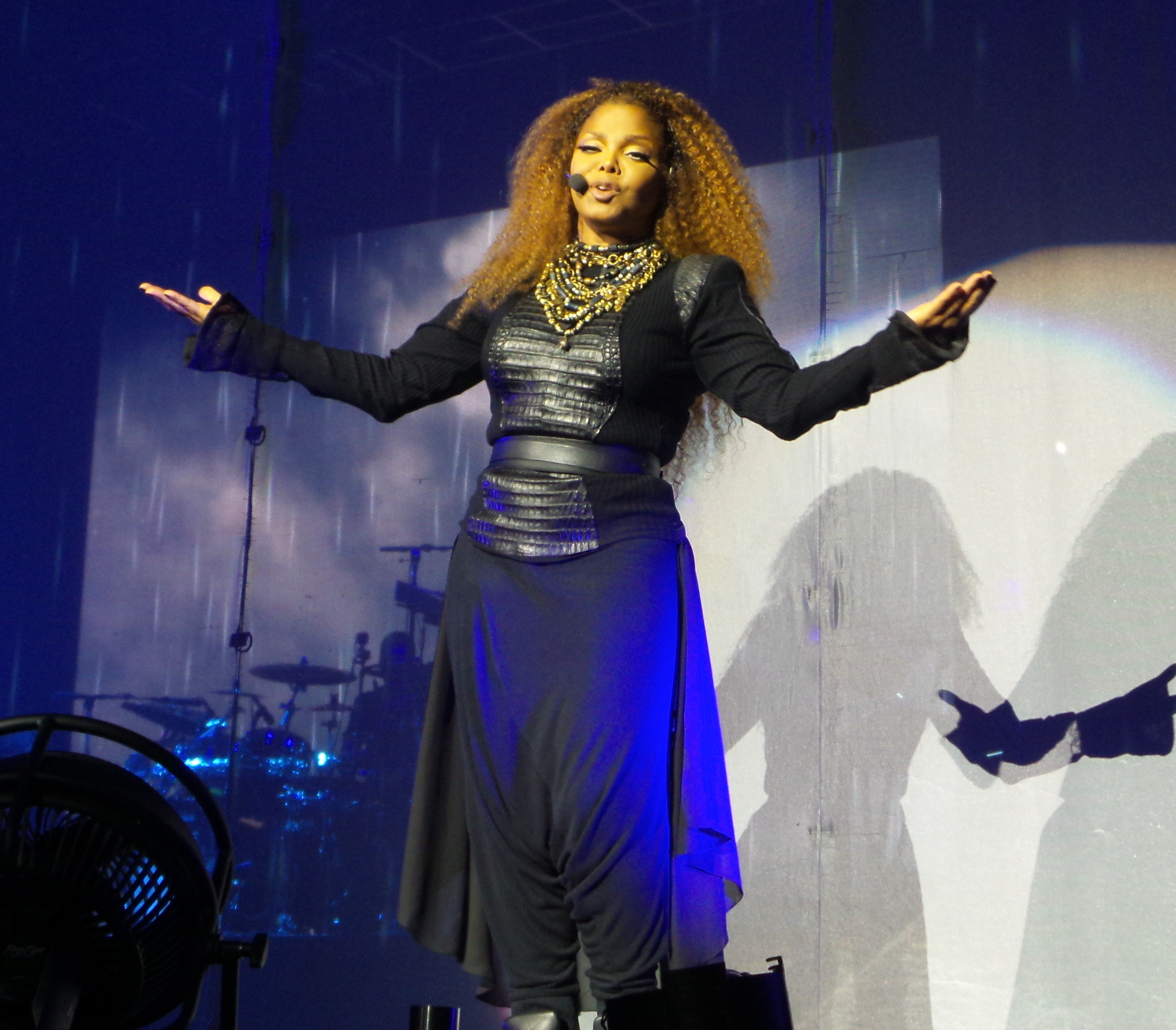
Jackson performing "Together Again" during her Unbreakable World Tour (2015–16)

In order to promote The Velvet Rope and the single, Jackson performed "Together Again" at the American Music Awards of 1998. The singer has also performed the song on all of her tours since its release. She included the song on the 1998 The Velvet Rope Tour. Dressed up in "chandeliers and sensible clothing", it was performed as the closing song from the concert. Jon Pareles from The New York Times viewed the performance as "an elegy disguised as an arm-waving, feel-good song". The performance of the song at the October 11, 1998, show in New York City, at the Madison Square Garden, was broadcast during a special titled The Velvet Rope: Live in Madison Square Garden by HBO. It was also added to the setlist at its DVD release, The Velvet Rope Tour – Live in Concert in 1999. It was again performed as the encore on the All for You Tour in support of her follow-up album, All for You in 2001 and 2002. Gina Vivinetto from St. Petersburg Times, while reviewing the concert, described the performance, "The show closed with a buoyant "Together Again" that found Jackson grinning, surrounded by dancers moving in refreshing, unscripted merriment". The February 16, 2002, final date of the tour at the Aloha Stadium in Hawaii, was broadcast by HBO, and included a performance of "Together Again". This rendition was also added to the setlist at its DVD release, Janet: Live in Hawaii, in 2002. Jackson also performed it on VH1's The Concert for New York City benefit concert which paid tribute to victims of the September 11 attacks the same year.

In 2004, while promoting her eighth studio album, Damita Jo, Jackson made surprise performances of "Together Again" and "All Nite (Don't Stop)" at New York's Gay Pride March. "Together Again" was one of her older songs on the 2008 Rock Witchu Tour, her first tour in seven years. It was at the middle of the setlist. She was dressed in a gold and black glam hip-hop-inspired track suit, and one gold glove. Variety magazine's Phil Gallo likened her vocals in the song to that of Diana Ross'. Rap-Up noted the audience "went wild" during the song. While reviewing the Vancouver concert, Marsha Lederman of The Globe and Mail noted that the most memorable moment of the show was when Jackson "stopped on the catwalk after her hit "Together Again", listened to the crowd roar its approval, and became emotional—really emotional. We're talking tears. 'Thank you,' she said—seeming to really mean it, as she waved her hands, begging the audience to stop", she completed. While promoting her second greatest hits album, Number Ones, the singer performed an eight-minute medley of six hits during the American Music Awards of 2009. It included "Control", "Miss You Much", "What Have You Done for Me Lately", "If", "Make Me", and finished with "Together Again". For the latter's performance, Jackson stood alone at center stage, smiling, as the received applauses and standing ovation from the audience. It also was the closing song of her concert at Essence Music Festival in New Orleans, in July 2010, which she headlined. "Together Again" was again performed as a closing number on her Number Ones: Up Close and Personal 2011 tour as a dedication to her late brother, Michael Jackson, wearing a tight white one-piece disco suit. MTV News' writer Vaughn Schoonmaker noted that the song appeared to be the biggest hit of the show. Writing for the Hartford Courant, Thomas Kintner pointed out that "A finale of 'Together Again', offered as a simple tribute that recalled her brother again, proved the evening's highlight, a relaxed trip through the sort of juicy pop Jackson has stockpiled throughout her career, and which still charms when she lets it run". Jackson also included the song on her 2015–16 Unbreakable World Tour. The song is also included on the 2017-2019 State of the World Tour. Jackson also included the song on her 2019 Las Vegas residency Janet Jackson: Metamorphosis. Jackson later named her 2023 tour after the song, and performed it in multiple versions throughout the show: The DJ Premier 100 in a 50 remix at the beginning of the show, the Deeper remix at the middle, and, as the encore, the album version.

== Impact and legacy ==
In 1999, "Together Again" won the award for "Most Played Song" at the BMI Pop Awards. In 2023, Rolling Stone ranked it number 34 in their list of "The 50 Most Inspirational LGBTQ Songs of All Time", naming it "Jackson's most deeply spiritual song", where she "sings with faith that we'll all one day be reunited with those who've gone before." In 2024, Esquire and Forbes ranked "Together Again" numbers 37 and 26 in their lists of the 50 best songs of the '90s. Hugh McIntyre of Forbes wrote, "'Together Again' was a message of love and resilience, wrapped in a pop tune the masses could fall in love with. It celebrated unity in the midst of loss, finding optimism in the darkest of times. A vibrant tribute where Jackson honors friends lost to AIDS through dance, many who enjoy the cut may not even realize how deep it really is." In March 2025, Billboard magazine ranked it number 52 in their list of "The 100 Best Dance Songs of All Time", noting that the song "cemented her gay icon stature".

== Track listings ==
- US CD and cassette single
1. "Together Again" (radio edit) – 4:08
2. "Together Again" (Jimmy Jam Deeper radio edit) – 4:00
3. "Together Again" (Jimmy Jam Deep radio edit) – 4:16
4. "Got 'til It's Gone" (Ummah Jay Dee's Revenge mix) – 3:45
- US maxi-CD single
1. "Together Again" (Jimmy Jam Deep remix) – 5:46
2. "Together Again" (Jimmy Jam Deeper remix) – 4:52
3. "Together Again" (Tony Moran 12-inch club mix) – 11:00
4. "Together Again" (Tony Humphries club mix) – 6:44
5. "Together Again" (DJ Premier Just tha Bass) – 5:22
- US 7-inch single
1. "Together Again" – 4:07
2. "Got 'til It's Gone" (Ummah Jay Dee's Revenge mix) – 3:45
- US 12-inch single
1. "Together Again" (Tony Moran 12-inch club mix) – 11:00
2. "Together Again" (Tony Humphries club mix) – 6:44
3. "Together Again" (Jimmy Jam extended deep club mix) – 6:29
4. "Together Again" (DJ Premier Just tha Bass) – 5:22
- UK, Australasian, and Japanese CD single; digital EP
1. "Together Again" (radio edit) – 4:07
2. "Together Again" (Tony Humphries club mix) – 6:44
3. "Together Again" (DJ Premier 100 in a 50 remix) – 5:22
4. "Together Again" (Jimmy Jam Deep remix) – 5:46
5. "Together Again" (Tony Moran 7-inch edit with Janet vocal intro) – 5:29
6. "Together Again" (Jimmy Jam Deeper radio edit) – 4:00
- UK 12-inch single
1. "Together Again" (Tony Humphries 12-inch edit mix) – 9:57
2. "Together Again" (Tony Humphries FBI edit dub) – 7:20
3. "Together Again" (DJ Premier 100 in a 50 remix) – 5:22
4. "Together Again" (DJ Premier Just tha Bass vocal) – 5:21
5. "Together Again" (Jimmy Jam Deep remix) – 5:46
- UK cassette single
1. "Together Again" (radio edit) – 4:07
2. "Together Again" (Tony Humphries club mix) – 6:44
3. "Together Again" (Jimmy Jam Deep remix) – 5:46
- European CD single
1. "Together Again" (radio edit) – 4:07
2. "Together Again" (Jimmy Jam Deeper radio edit) – 4:00

== Credits and personnel ==
Credits are adapted from The Velvet Rope album booklet.

Studios

- Engineered and mixed at Flyte Time Studios (Edina, Minnesota)
- Mastered at Bernie Grundman Mastering (Hollywood, California)

Personnel

- Janet Jackson – vocals, songwriter, producer, vocal and rhythm arrangement
- Jimmy Jam and Terry Lewis – songwriters, producers, all other instruments, vocal and rhythm arrangements
- René Elizondo Jr. – songwriter
- Steve Hodge – engineering, mixing
- Alexander Richbourg – drum machine
- Xavier Smith – assistant engineer

== Charts ==
=== Weekly charts ===
Weekly chart performance for "Together Again"
| Chart (1997–1998) | Peak position |
|---|---|
| Australia (ARIA) | 4 |
| Austria (Ö3 Austria Top 40) | 6 |
| Belgium (Ultratop 50 Flanders) | 2 |
| Belgium (Ultratop 50 Wallonia) | 2 |
| Canada (Nielsen SoundScan) | 2 |
| Canada Top Singles (RPM) | 2 |
| Canada Adult Contemporary (RPM) | 23 |
| Canada Dance/Urban (RPM) | 1 |
| Canada Contemporary Hit Radio (BDS) | 1 |
| Croatia International (HRT) (Note: Only a partial archive of the Croatian charts is available so it is possible that the single had a higher peak.) | 7 |
| Denmark (IFPI) | 2 |
| Europe (Eurochart Hot 100) | 1 |
| Finland (Suomen virallinen lista) | 16 |
| France (SNEP) | 2 |
| Germany (GfK) | 2 |
| Hungary (Mahasz) | 1 |
| Iceland (Íslenski Listinn Topp 40) | 20 |
| Ireland (IRMA) | 4 |
| Italy (Musica e dischi) | 5 |
| Italy Airplay (Music & Media) | 1 |
| Netherlands (Dutch Top 40) | 1 |
| Netherlands (Single Top 100) | 1 |
| New Zealand (Recorded Music NZ) | 5 |
| Norway (VG-lista) | 11 |
| Poland Airplay (Music & Media) | 1 |
| Scottish Singles Sales (Official Charts) | 6 |
| Spain (AFYVE) | 4 |
| Sweden (Sverigetopplistan) | 9 |
| Switzerland (Schweizer Hitparade) | 2 |
| UK Singles (Official Charts) | 4 |
| UK Dance (Official Charts) | 4 |
| UK Hip Hop/R&B (Official Charts) | 1 |
| UK Airplay (Music Week) | 2 |
| US Billboard Hot 100 | 1 |
| US Adult Pop Airplay (Billboard) | 29 |
| US Dance Club Songs (Billboard) | 1 |
| US Hot R&B/Hip-Hop Songs (Billboard) | 8 |
| US Pop Airplay (Billboard) | 5 |
| US Rhythmic Airplay (Billboard) | 8 |

=== Year-end charts ===
1997 year-end chart performance for "Together Again"
| Chart (1997) | Position |
|---|---|
| Australia (ARIA) | 96 |
| UK Singles (OCC) | 34 |

1998 year-end chart performance for "Together Again"
| Chart (1998) | Position |
|---|---|
| Australia (ARIA) | 27 |
| Austria (Ö3 Austria Top 40) | 32 |
| Belgium (Ultratop 50 Flanders) | 15 |
| Belgium (Ultratop 50 Wallonia) | 9 |
| Canada Top Singles (RPM) | 11 |
| Canada Dance (RPM) | 22 |
| Europe (Eurochart Hot 100) | 4 |
| France (SNEP) | 7 |
| Germany (Media Control) | 18 |
| Italy (Musica e dischi) | 39 |
| Netherlands (Dutch Top 40) | 4 |
| Netherlands (Single Top 100) | 3 |
| Sweden (Hitlistan) | 58 |
| Switzerland (Schweizer Hitparade) | 17 |
| UK Singles (OCC) | 32 |
| US Billboard Hot 100 | 6 |
| US Adult Top 40 (Billboard) | 70 |
| US Dance Club Play (Billboard) | 50 |
| US Hot R&B Singles (Billboard) | 44 |
| US Mainstream Top 40 (Billboard) | 12 |
| US Maxi-Singles Sales (Billboard) | 26 |
| US Rhythmic Top 40 (Billboard) | 34 |

=== Decade-end charts ===
Decade-end chart performance for "Together Again"
| Chart (1990–1999) | Position |
|---|---|
| Australia (ARIA) | 96 |
| Belgium (Ultratop) | 182 |
| Netherlands (Dutch Top 40) | 20 |
| UK Singles (OCC) | 59 |
| US Billboard Hot 100 | 74 |

== Certifications ==
Certifications and sales for "Together Again"
| Region | Certification | Certified units/sales |
|---|---|---|
| Australia (ARIA) | Platinum | 70,000^{^} |
| Belgium (BRMA) | Platinum | 50,000^{*} |
| France (SNEP) | Platinum | 500,000^{*} |
| Germany (BVMI) | Platinum | 500,000^{^} |
| Netherlands (NVPI) | Gold | 50,000^{^} |
| New Zealand (RMNZ) | Gold | 5,000^{*} |
| New Zealand (RMNZ) digital | Platinum | 30,000^{‡} |
| Sweden (GLF) | Gold | 15,000^{^} |
| Switzerland (IFPI Switzerland) | Gold | 25,000^{^} |
| United Kingdom (BPI) | 2× Platinum | 1,200,000^{‡} |
| United States (RIAA) | Platinum | 1,000,000^{‡} |
^{*} Sales figures based on certification alone.^{^} Shipments figures based on certification alone.^{‡} Sales+streaming figures based on certification alone.

== Usage in media ==
In 2023, Fifty Fifty used an interpolation of "Together Again" in their song "Barbie Dreams" for Barbie the Album.
