= Flash Mob America =

Production company based in Los Angeles

- Founded: 2009
- Founders: Staci Lawrence, Conroe Brooks
- Headquarters: Los Angeles, California
- Website: www.flashmobamerica.com

Flash Mob America is an American flash mob production company based in Los Angeles founded in 2009.

== History ==
After meeting at an event following the death of Michael Jackson in 2009, co-founders Staci Lawrence and Conroe Brooks decided to put on flash-mob tribute on to Jackson, based on one they saw on YouTube. The company was founded by the duo later that year. Universal Music Group hired Flash Mob America to create three flash mobs around the release of Janet Jackson's Number Ones album. The company has also been used for marriage proposals.

In October 2011, FMA was hired by former NFL Quarterback Steve Young's wife to surprise him for his 50th birthday.

In June 2012, the wife of real estate developer Kirk Kerkorian hired FMA to surprise him outside of the Beverly Hills Hotel with a flash mob to the song "To Know Him Is To Love Him" by The Shirelles.

On March 1, 2013, the students of the Bush school at Texas A&M surprised former President George H.W. Bush, with the help of FMA.
