= Number Ones (Janet Jackson album) =

Greatest hits album by Janet Jackson
- Released: November 17, 2009
- Recorded: 1985–2009
- Genre: Pop; R&B
- Length: 149:47
- Label: A&M; UM^{e}
- Producer: Janet Jackson; Jimmy Jam and Terry Lewis; René Elizondo Jr.; Rodney "Darkchild" Jerkins; D'Mile; LRoc; Michael Jackson

Janet Jackson chronology
Discipline (2008)	Number Ones (2009)	Icon: Number Ones (2010)

Singles from Number Ones
- 1. "Make Me" Released: September 22, 2009

Number Ones (released internationally as The Best) is the second greatest hits album by American singer Janet Jackson. It was released on November 17, 2009, by Interscope Geffen A&M Records and Universal Music Enterprises. The double-disc album is composed of 33 of her number-one singles on various music charts across the globe.

Number Ones collects singles from her third studio album Control (1986) to her tenth studio album Discipline (2008), and was made possible as a joint venture between Universal Music Group and EMI. The album's only single "Make Me" was made available for digital download on September 22, 2009, and went on to become her nineteenth number-one single on Dance Club Songs. The album was acclaimed by music critics, who praised her catalogue and influence in the music industry. Jackson promoted the album with interviews and television performances, including a performance at the 2009 American Music Awards. It was further promoted with the Number Ones, Up Close and Personal tour in 2011, which visited North America, Europe, Asia, Oceania and Africa.

== Background and development ==
In September 2009, Janet Jackson performed "Scream" on the 2009 MTV Video Music Awards as part of a medley tribute to Michael Jackson, who died three months earlier. Following this, "Make Me" was released on Jackson's official website as an audio stream for those who joined the site's e-mail newsletter. On September 22, 2009, it was released as a digital download for purchase. Although claims were made that "Make Me" is a tribute song to her late brother, Michael Jackson's single "Don't Stop 'Til You Get Enough" (1979), Jackson later stated in an interview with Ryan Seacrest it is not, despite the similarity of the lyrics in the song's outro. In October 2009, Universal Music Enterprises issued a press release stating "Make Me" would be included on Jackson's second greatest hits album, comprising 33 of her global number-one singles. The two-disc set spans chart-topping singles from Control (1986) to Discipline (2008) across the Billboard Hot 100, Hot R&B/Hip-Hop Songs, Dance Club Songs, Adult Contemporary, and international charts.

== Release and promotion ==
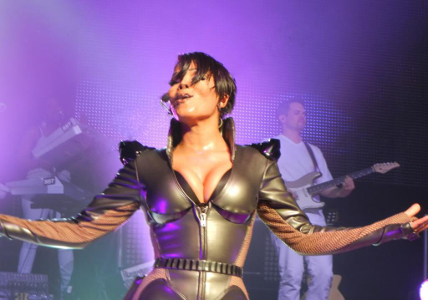
Jackson performing on tour

Number Ones was released on November 17, 2009, by Interscope Geffen A&M Records and Universal Music Enterprises; internationally, it was released as The Best. To celebrate the release of Number Ones, Universal Music Group and Flash Mob America organized three fan gatherings in Los Angeles on November 14. Kyle Anderson of MTV reported fans' gatherings in various Los Angeles locations "to dance and pay tribute to some of the veteran diva's best dance moves and songs." Jackson made an appearance at the gathering which took place at The Grove at Farmers Market. ABC's In the Spotlight with Robin Roberts interviewed Jackson in a one-hour interview special that aired on November 18, 2009. A few days later, Jackson performed an eight-minute medley of six hits during the 2009 American Music Awards. It included "Control", "Miss You Much", "What Have You Done for Me Lately", "If", "Make Me", and finished with "Together Again". At the end of the performance, she received applause and a standing ovation from the audience. Jackson traveled to the United Kingdom to further promote the album. She performed "Make Me" on The X Factor results show on December 6, 2009. She closed the concert with a medley of her greatest hits including "Make Me", wearing half hareem-pant, half skirt concoction, jackets and high-top trainers.

On February 4, 2011, Jackson embarked on her sixth concert tour to further promote Number Ones, entitled Number Ones: Up Close and Personal. It visited Asia, North America, Europe, Australia, Africa, and South America. Jackson traveled to 35 different cities selected by fans, one chosen for each of her number-one hits. The tour took an organic and intimate approach, excluding the elaborate theatrics and pyrotechnics her concerts have become infamous for, focusing on her musicality and choreography. Fans were to vote on cities via her official website. She honored 20 people who performed service in their community with the "20 Under 20" contest and dedicated one hit to each city during every show. In December, Jackson announced the first date in Wan Chai, Hong Kong. In April, Jackson extended the tour's North American and European legs into the fall due to massive sellouts. She also extended the tour into Australia, Africa, and South America. The show's intimate aura was praised among critics, many commending Jackson's showmanship in contrast to her more recent contemporaries. The majority of the tour had completely sold out. The tour achieved several attendance records, and grossed US$60 million in total.

== Singles ==
"Make Me" was released as the lead and only single from the album on September 22, 2009, being the only new song included on the album. The song was presented as an audio stream to those who joined her official mailing list in September, and was later released for digital download. The song failed to chart on the US Billboard Hot 100, but peaked at number 71 on the Hot R&B/Hip-Hop Songs and became her nineteenth Dance Club Songs number-one single on the chart dated December 22, 2009. Thus Jackson became the first artist to earn number-one singles on Dance Club Songs across four decades, from the 1980s to the 2010s. "Make Me" also entered the top fifty in Italy, the top twenty in Japan and the top seventy-five in the United Kingdom.

== Critical reception ==
Professional ratings
Review scores
Source	Rating
AllMusic	5/5 stars
Rockstar Weekly	favorable
Slant Magazine	4.5/5 stars

Number Ones received universal acclaim from music critics. Sal Cinquemani of Slant Magazine gave the album four-and-a-half stars, commenting "that the songs on Janet Jackson's first-ever comprehensive hits collection, Number Ones, have been sequenced in chronological order only magnifies the impact she had on late-'80s and early-'90s pop, when she helped define the sound of Top 40 radio along with the likes of Madonna, Prince, and her brother Michael." He also commented on the commercial decline of her recent work, stating "[b]ut just as Number Ones's sequencing highlights Janet's impressive early years, it also underscores her startlingly abrupt decline...and the "hits" from her last three albums are a mere footnote here." Andy Kellman of AllMusic remarked: "Say what you want about Janet peaking with Jam & Lewis during the latter half of the '80s—to be fair, the argument is valid—but she did rack up a career's worth of solid hits during the years that followed. Even if they were not as sonically innovative and lacked the same amount of pop appeal of the Control/Rhythm Nation-era singles, they clearly made a significant impact and have aged well." Val Christopher of Rockstar Weekly commented, "A look back at Jackson's storied career provides more than ample reason for her being one of the world's most recognizable people. Number Ones opens with a string of Jackson's best and most memorable tracks. 'What Have You Done For Me Lately', 'Nasty', 'Control', 'Miss You Much' and perhaps her finest single, 'Rhythm Nation'."

== Accolades ==
Year	Award	Category	Recipient	Result	Ref.
2010	International Dance Music Award	Best Urban Dance Track	"Make Me"	Nominated	

== Commercial performance ==
Number Ones debuted at number 22 on the US Billboard 200, selling 80,748 units (40,374 in pure sales) in its first week. It has since sold 546,000 units, including 273,000 in pure sales, in the United States.

The Best performed similarly internationally, peaking at number 20 in Japan and number 28 in the United Kingdom. It was certified gold by the British Phonographic Industry (BPI) for sales in excess of 100,000.

== Track listings ==
Number Ones – North American edition (disc one)
No.	Title	Writer(s)	Producer(s)	Length
1.	"What Have You Done for Me Lately"	James Harris III; Terry Lewis; Janet Jackson	Lewis; Jimmy Jam; Jackson^{[a]}	4:44
2.	"Nasty"	Harris; Lewis; Jackson	Lewis; Jam; Jackson^{[a]}	4:03
3.	"When I Think of You"	Harris; Lewis; Jackson	Lewis; Jam; Jackson^{[a]}	3:57
4.	"Control"	Harris; Lewis; Jackson	Lewis; Jam; Jackson^{[a]}	5:53
5.	"Let's Wait Awhile" (single remix)	Harris; Lewis; Jackson; Melanie Andrews	Lewis; Jam; Jackson	4:37
6.	"The Pleasure Principle" (Design of a Decade edit)	Monte Moir	Moir; Jackson^{[a]}; Steve Wiese^{[a]}	4:14
7.	"Diamonds" (with Herb Alpert)	Harris; Lewis	Jam; Lewis	4:53
8.	"Miss You Much"	Lewis; Harris	Lewis; Jam; Jackson^{[a]}	4:12
9.	"Rhythm Nation" (Radio Edit w/ "Pledge" intro)	Jackson; Harris; Lewis	Lewis; Jam; Jackson^{[a]}	5:29
10.	"Escapade"	Jackson; Harris; Lewis	Lewis; Jam; Jackson^{[a]}	4:44
11.	"Alright" (7" video version with Rap; featuring Heavy D)	Jackson; Harris; Lewis	Lewis; Jam; Jackson^{[a]}	4:59
12.	"Come Back to Me" (I'm Beggin' You Mix)	Jackson; Harris; Lewis	Lewis; Jam; Jackson^{[a]}	5:36
13.	"Black Cat" (video mix/short solo)	Jackson	Jackson; Jellybean Johnson	4:31
14.	"Love Will Never Do (Without You)" (single edit)	Harris; Lewis	Lewis; Jam; Jackson^{[a]}	4:35
15.	"The Best Things in Life Are Free" (with Luther Vandross, BBD and Ralph Tresvant)	Harris; Lewis; Ralph Tresvant; Michael Bivins; Ronald DeVoe	Lewis; Jam	4:36
16.	"That's the Way Love Goes"	Jackson; Harris; Lewis; Fred Wesley; Charles Bobbit; John Starks; James Brown	Lewis; Jam; Jackson	4:25
Total length:				75:30

The Best – International edition (disc one)
No.	Title	Writer(s)	Producer(s)	Length
17.	"When I Think of You" (David Morales Remix Edit)	Harris; Lewis; Jackson	Lewis; Jam; Jackson^{[a]}; David Morales^{[b]}	3:31
Total length:				79:01

Number Ones – North American edition (disc two)
No.	Title	Writer(s)	Producer(s)	Length
1.	"If"	Jackson; Lewis; Harris	Jackson; Lewis; Jam	4:32
2.	"Again"	Jackson; Harris; Lewis	Jackson; Lewis; Jam	3:47
3.	"Because of Love"	Jackson; Harris; Lewis	Jackson; Lewis; Jam	4:18
4.	"Any Time, Any Place" (R. Kelly Remix)	Jackson; Lewis; Harris	Jackson; Lewis; Jam; R. Kelly^{[b]}	5:12
5.	"Scream" (with Michael Jackson)	Harris; Lewis; Michael Jackson; Jackson	Jam; Lewis; M. Jackson; Jackson	4:02
6.	"Runaway"	Jackson; Harris; Lewis	Jackson; Lewis; Jam	3:34
7.	"Got 'til It's Gone" (single edit; featuring Q-Tip and Joni Mitchell)	Jackson; Lewis; Harris; René Elizondo Jr.; Roberta Mitchell; Kamaal Ibn Fareed	Jackson; Lewis; Jam	3:36
8.	"Together Again" (single edit)	Jackson; Lewis; Elizondo; Harris	Jackson; Lewis; Jam	4:07
9.	"I Get Lonely" (single edit)	Jackson; Lewis; Elizondo; Harris	Jackson; Lewis; Jam	4:01
10.	"Go Deep"	Jackson; Lewis; Elizondo; Harris	Jackson; Lewis; Jam	4:44
11.	"What's It Gonna Be?!" (with Busta Rhymes)	Trevor Smith; Darrell Allamby; Antoinette Roberson	Allamby	4:03
12.	"Doesn't Really Matter"	Jackson; Harris; Lewis	Jackson; Lewis; Jam	4:56
13.	"All for You" (video mix)	Jackson; Harris; Lewis; Wayne Garfield; David Romani; Mauro Malavasi	Jackson; Lewis; Jam	4:32
14.	"Someone to Call My Lover" (single edit)	Jackson; Lewis; Harris; Dewey Bunnell	Jackson; Lewis; Jam	4:15
15.	"All Nite (Don't Stop)"	Jackson; Harris; Lewis; Tony "Prof T" Tolbert; Anders Bagge; Arnthor Birgisson; Herbie Hancock; Paul Jackson; Melvin Ragin	Bag & Arnthor; Jackson	3:27
16.	"Call on Me" (with Nelly)	Jermaine Dupri; Johnta Austin; James Phillips; Cornell Haynes; Harris; Lewis	Dupri; LRoc; Jam; Lewis; Jackson	3:35
17.	"Feedback" (single version)	Rodney Jerkins; Dernst Emile; Tasleema Yasin; LaShawn Daniels	Darkchild; D'Mile	3:56
18.	"Make Me"	Jackson; Jerkins; Thomas Lumpkins; Michaela Shiloh	Jackson; Darkchild	3:38
Total length:				74:15

Number Ones – North American iTunes Store edition (bonus track)
No.	Title	Writer(s)	Producer(s)	Length
19.	"Make Me" (Bimbo Jones Radio Edit)	Jackson; Jerkins; Lumpkins; Shiloh	Jackson; Darkchild; Bimbo Jones^{[b]}	3:19
Total length:				77:34

Number Ones – Target exclusive edition (bonus track)
No.	Title	Writer(s)	Producer(s)	Length
19.	"Make Me" (Moto Blanco Radio Mix)	Jackson; Jerkins; Lumpkins; Shiloh	Jackson; Darkchild; Moto Blanco^{[b]}	3:24
Total length:				77:39

The Best – International edition (disc two)
No.	Title	Writer(s)	Producer(s)	Length
18.	"Whoops Now"	Jackson; Harris; Lewis	Jackson; Lewis; Jam	4:06
19.	"Make Me"	Jackson; Jerkins; Lumpkins; Shiloh	Jackson; Darkchild	3:38
Total length:				78:21

The Best – International iTunes Store edition (bonus track)
No.	Title	Writer(s)	Producer(s)	Length
20.	"Make Me" (Bimbo Jones Radio Edit)	Jackson; Jerkins; Lumpkins; Shiloh	Jackson; Darkchild; Bimbo Jones^{[b]}	3:19
Total length:				81:40

Number Ones – Limited edition 2LP
No.	Title	Writer(s)	Producer(s)	Length
1.	"What Have You Done for Me Lately"	James Harris III; Terry Lewis; Janet Jackson	Lewis; Jimmy Jam; Jackson^{[a]}	4:44
2.	"Nasty"	Harris; Lewis; Jackson	Lewis; Jam; Jackson^{[a]}	4:03
3.	"When I Think of You"	Harris; Lewis; Jackson	Lewis; Jam; Jackson^{[a]}	3:57
4.	"Miss You Much"	Lewis; Harris	Lewis; Jam; Jackson^{[a]}	4:12
5.	"Escapade"	Jackson; Harris; Lewis	Lewis; Jam; Jackson^{[a]}	4:44
6.	"Alright" (7" video version with Rap; featuring Heavy D)	Jackson; Harris; Lewis	Lewis; Jam; Jackson^{[a]}	4:59
7.	"That's the Way Love Goes"	Jackson; Harris; Lewis; Fred Wesley; Charles Bobbit; John Starks; James Brown	Lewis; Jam; Jackson	4:25
8.	"Together Again" (single edit)	Jackson; Lewis; Elizondo; Harris	Jackson; Lewis; Jam	4:07
9.	"Doesn't Really Matter"	Jackson; Harris; Lewis	Jackson; Lewis; Jam	4:56
10.	"All for You" (video mix)	Jackson; Harris; Lewis; Wayne Garfield; David Romani; Mauro Malavasi	Jackson; Lewis; Jam	4:32
11.	"The Pleasure Principle" (Design of a Decade edit)	Monte Moir	Moir; Jackson^{[a]}; Steve Wiese^{[a]}	4:14
12.	"Rhythm Nation" (7" edit)	Jackson; Harris; Lewis	Lewis; Jam; Jackson^{[a]}	4:31
Total length:				53:28

Notes

- ^{^[a]} signifies a co-producer
- ^{^[b]} signifies a remixer

== Personnel ==
- Darrell "Delite" Allamby – composer
- Melanie Andrews – composer
- Johnta Austin – composer
- Michael Bivins – composer
- Charles Bobbit – composer
- Dewey Bunnell – composer
- LaShawn Daniels – composer
- John William Davis – composer
- Ronnie DeVoe – composer
- Jermaine Dupri – composer
- Dernst Emile – composer
- Wayne Garfield – composer
- Herbie Hancock – composer
- Janet Jackson – composer
- Michael Jackson – composer
- Jimmy Jam – composer/producer
- Rodney Jerkins – composer
- Terry Lewis – composer
- Mauro Malavasi – composer
- Joni Mitchell – composer
- Monte Moir – composer
- Melvin "Wah Wah" Ragin – composer
- Antoinette Roberson – composer
- David Romani – composer
- Trevor Smith – composer
- John Starks – composer
- Ralph Tresvant – composer
- Fred Wesley – composer

== Charts ==
=== Weekly charts ===
2009 weekly chart performance for Number Ones
Chart (2009)	Peak position
Belgian Albums (Ultratop Flanders)	70
Japanese Albums (Oricon)	20
Scottish Albums (OCC)	46
UK Albums (OCC)	28
US Billboard 200	22
US Top R&B/Hip-Hop Albums (Billboard)	3

2011 weekly chart performance for Number Ones
Chart (2011)	Peak position
South Korean International Albums (Gaon)	76

=== Year-end charts ===
Year-end chart performance for Number Ones
Chart (2010)	Position
US Top R&B/Hip-Hop Albums (Billboard)	48

== Certifications ==
Region	Certification	Certified units/sales
United Kingdom (BPI)	Gold	100,000^{‡}
^{‡} Sales+streaming figures based on certification alone.

== Release history ==
Country	Date	Title	Format(s)	Label(s)	Ref.
Canada	November 17, 2009	Number Ones	Double CD; digital download	Universal Music	
Mexico	November 17, 2009	The Best	Double CD; digital download	Universal Music	
United States	November 17, 2009	Number Ones	Double CD; digital download	A&M; UM^{e}	
Japan	November 18, 2009	The Best	Double CD; digital download	Universal Music	
Germany	November 20, 2009	The Best	Double CD; digital download	Universal Music	
France	November 23, 2009	The Best	Double CD; digital download	Universal Music	
United Kingdom	November 23, 2009	The Best	Double CD; digital download	Polydor	
Australia	November 27, 2009	The Best	Double CD; digital download	Universal Music	
Brazil	December 1, 2009	The Best	Double CD; digital download	Universal Music	
United States	January 22, 2021	Number Ones	Double Vinyl	A&M; UM^{e}	
