= Miss You Much =

1989 single by Janet Jackson

Single by Janet Jackson

from the album Janet Jackson's Rhythm Nation 1814
- B-side: "You Need Me"
- Released: August 16, 1989
- Recorded: 1988–1989
- Studio: Flyte Tyme (Minneapolis, Minnesota)
- Genre: Dance-pop; new jack swing
- Length: 4:12 (album version); 3:52 (international edit)
- Label: A&M
- Songwriters: James Harris III; Terry Lewis
- Producers: Jimmy Jam and Terry Lewis; Janet Jackson

Janet Jackson singles chronology
"Funny How Time Flies (When You're Having Fun)" (1987)	"Miss You Much" (1989)	"Rhythm Nation" (1989)

Music video
- "Miss You Much" on YouTube

"Miss You Much" is a song by American singer Janet Jackson. Composed by songwriters and record producers Jimmy Jam and Terry Lewis, it was recorded for the singer's fourth studio album, Janet Jackson's Rhythm Nation 1814 (1989). As with all tracks for the album, recording took place at Lewis and Jam's Flyte Tyme Studios in Minneapolis, Minnesota, between 1988 and 1989. Lyrically, the song narrates a longing to reconnect with a romantic partner after time spent apart.

"Miss You Much" was released as the lead single from Rhythm Nation 1814 on August 16, 1989, by A&M Records. It topped the US Billboard Hot 100 singles chart, becoming the second number one hit of Jackson's career. Spending four consecutive weeks atop the chart, it was the longest running number one single of 1989. It is Jackson's third longest running Hot 100 number one, behind "That's the Way Love Goes" (1993) and "All for You" (2001), which spent eight and seven weeks at number one, respectively. It also topped several Billboard composite charts, including the Hot Black Singles and Dance Club Songs charts. Internationally, the single became a top 40 hit in all territories where it charted. It is certified platinum by the Recording Industry Association of America (RIAA), denoting one million copies shipped in the US alone. It emerged as the number one radio airplay hit of 1989 and the second best-selling single of the year behind "Another Day in Paradise" by Phil Collins. Based on changing metrics of how chart performance is evaluated, Billboard magazine listed "Miss You Much" as Jackson's all-time biggest Hot 100 hit.

A music video for the song directed by Dominic Sena was produced as part of the Rhythm Nation 1814 film, which aired as a 30-minute special on MTV prior to the album's release. The video for "Miss You Much" serves as the opening segment of the film and is followed by videos for two other songs from the album, "The Knowledge" and the title-track "Rhythm Nation", to form a complete narrative. Its inclusion in Rhythm Nation 1814 made it part of one of the largest projects to have ever been attempted by A&M, with a budget of $1.6 million for the entire film. As with the other two components of the film, "Miss You Much" is shot entirely in black and white. Choreographed by Jackson, Anthony Thomas and Terry Bixler, the video features a complex dance routine, culminating with a sequence where Jackson and her back-up dancers use chairs as props in conjunction with their performance. Since the video's release, numerous artists have taken inspiration from or replicated the chair routine in their own videos and live performances, including Britney Spears, Usher, Backstreet Boys, NSYNC and Tinashe.

In 1990, "Miss You Much" received Grammy Award nominations for Best Female R&B Vocal Performance and Best Rhythm & Blues Song. It won the Billboard Award for the Top Hot 100 Single of the Year and the American Music Awards for Favorite Dance Single and Favorite R&B Single. It has been included in each of Jackson's greatest hits albums, Design of a Decade: 1986–1996 (1995), Number Ones (2009) and Icon: Number Ones (2010). The song was covered in the Korean film 200 Pounds Beauty (2006) and has also being sampled by artists such as 50 Cent.

== Background ==
After the success of Control, Jackson remained silent on the charts for over two years before returning with "Miss You Much", the lead single from Rhythm Nation 1814. It became Jackson's biggest selling single at the time, reaching number one on the Billboard Hot 100, where it remained for four weeks. "Miss You Much" also became her second number-one hit, the first being "When I Think of You". The song sold over four million copies, becoming one of the biggest-selling songs of the year. The song peaked at number two in Canada and reached the top twenty in Australia and many European countries.

"Miss You Much" received two American Music Awards for Favorite Dance Single and Favorite Soul/R&B Single, with Jackson also nominated for Favorite Dance Artist at the American Music Awards of 1990. The song received two Grammy nominations for Best Female R&B Vocal Performance and Best R&B Song at the 33rd Annual Grammy Awards. The single also won a Billboard Music Award for Top Hot 100 Single of the Year at the 1990 Billboard Music Awards and a Soul Train Music Award for Best Female R&B Single at the 1990 Soul Train Music Awards. It was also Jackson's fourth number one on the Hot Dance Club Songs chart. The "Miss You Much" single includes the B-side "You Need Me", written by Janet Jackson, James Harris III and Terry Lewis.

== Chart performance ==
Heavy anticipation and radio airplay during the late summer allowed "Miss You Much" to debut at number 42 on the Billboard Hot 100 the week of September 2, 1989. After three weeks, as "Miss You Much" entered the top-ten of Billboard Hot 100, music industry prognosticators theorized that the song would become Jackson's second number-one song on the Hot 100. However, the song started facing competition from fellow singer Madonna's single "Cherish", which also moved into the top-five the same week. The popular media pitted the two women against each other and tried to create rivalry between them. The song eventually topped on October 7, 1989, the same week "Cherish" peaked at number two. It was the biggest airplay hit of the year, and fifth biggest overall, also peaking atop the Hot Dance Club Play and Hot R&B/Hip-Hop Songs charts. The song was the second best-selling single of the year, behind only Phil Collins' "Another Day in Paradise". It reached number 2 in Canada and New Zealand, and the top twenty of Australia, Finland, Germany, Switzerland, and the Netherlands. It peaked within the top twenty five on the United Kingdom singles charts, although its accompanying album reached the top five on the UK albums chart.

== Music video ==
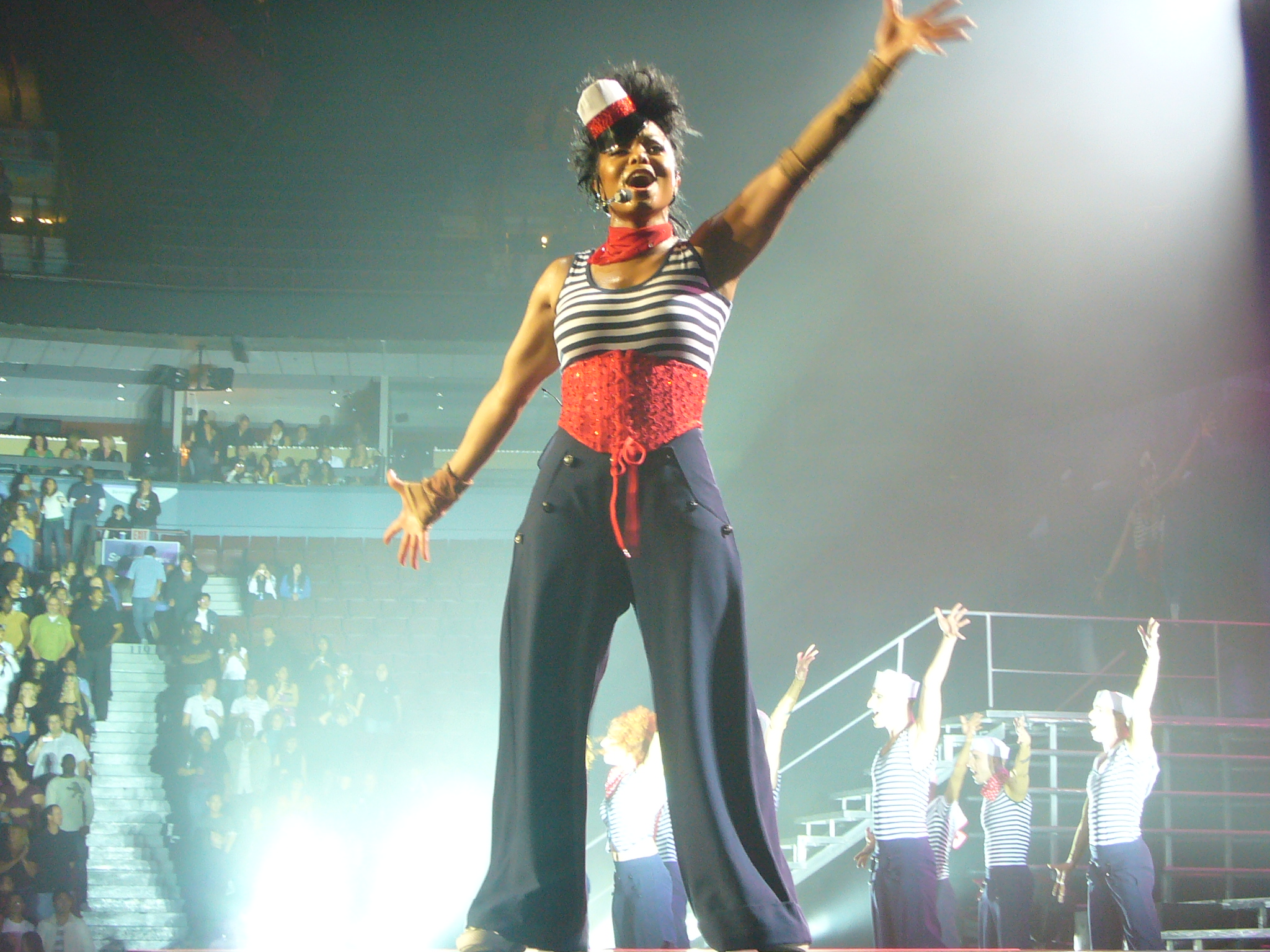
Jackson performing the song on her Rock Witchu Tour in 2008.

Directed by Dominic Sena, choreographed by Jackson and Anthony Thomas, and filmed in August 1989 as part of the long-form Rhythm Nation 1814 film, the black-and-white video for "Miss You Much" begins with dancers gathered at a pool hall, gossiping about Jackson and her boyfriend. Jackson enters the room as her dancers suddenly become quiet and look at her. One dancer asks Jackson what she has been doing lately. She jokingly responds, before demonstrating her love through song and dance. The end of the video cuts to a final dance routine performed with chairs, choreographed by Terry Bixler.

The video's choreography and chair routine are regarded as iconic in popular culture. The chair routine is available on the Rhythm Nation Compilation DVD.

== Live performances ==
Jackson has performed "Miss You Much" on all of her tours, including the Rhythm Nation 1814 Tour, janet. Tour, The Velvet Rope Tour, All for You Tour, Rock Witchu Tour, Number Ones: Up Close and Personal, Unbreakable World Tour, State of the World Tour, and her Las Vegas Residency Janet Jackson: Metamorphosis. It was also included on her special concert series Janet Jackson: A Special 30th Anniversary Celebration of Rhythm Nation in 2019.

While promoting her second greatest hits album Number Ones, the singer performed an eight-minute medley of six hits during the American Music Awards of 2009. It included "Control", "Miss You Much", "What Have You Done for Me Lately", "If", "Make Me", and finished with "Together Again".

== Legacy ==
- Britney Spears referenced the "Miss You Much" video, and Jackson's "The Pleasure Principle" video, for the chair routine in her "Stronger" video. The video's director Joseph Kahn said Spears' idea for the routine was inspired by "Janet Jackson's 'Pleasure Principle' — the iconic chair sequence in that." A review of the video commented "Ms. Spears gives us her best Janet Jackson impression ("Miss You Much") with a dizzying chair-dance routine."
- The popular boy band the Backstreet Boys performed a chair routine similar to Jackson's in their 1999 Disney Channel in Concert special to the track "As Long as You Love Me".
- When asked if NSYNC was copying their rival the Backstreet Boys with their chair routine during "For The Girl Who Has Everything" performance from their Pay Per View concert special NSYNC 'N Concert, Justin Timberlake corrects Rick Campanelli and states they got it from Janet Jackson's "Miss You Much"
- During Jackson's inaugural MTV Icon tribute, "Miss You Much" was performed by Pink, Usher, and Mýa to honor Jackson. Pink notably recreated the video's iconic chair routine.
- VH1's show Miss You Much was titled after the song.
- "Miss You Much" was covered by Korean singer Youme in the South Korean comedy film 200 Pounds Beauty in 2005. In the film, the song is performed by fictional Korean pop singer Ammy (Ji Seo-yun).
- 50 Cent's single "Follow My Lead", which features Robin Thicke, references "Miss You Much" in the line "like Janet Jackson said, I miss you much."
- Akon's single "Right Now (Na Na Na)" references and interpolates "Miss You Much" by quoting the line "I miss you much" using the same rhythm and melody.
- "Miss You Much" was played during an episode of Tori Spelling's show So NoTORIous.
- The song was used in one of the opening scenes of the film Ghost Dad, starring Bill Cosby.
- The song was used in the opening sequence of the film Southside with You.
- "Weird Al" Yankovic included the song's chorus in his polka medley "Polka Your Eyes Out" from his album Off the Deep End.
- "Miss You Much" was featured in a dance scene in the movie Hustlers. The scene featured the main cast doing choreography to the song. It was also featured in the end credits.
- The song was used in a lip sync between Ra'Jah O'Hara and Brooke Lynn Hytes on the second episode of the sixth season of RuPaul's Drag Race: All Stars.
- Leslie Cheung recorded a Cantonese version in his 1989 album Final Encounter.

== Official versions ==
- Album version – 4:12
- Design of a Decade international edit – 3:51
- A cappella – 3:25
- 7" edit – 3:55
- Mama Mix – 7:24
- Oh I Like That Mix – 4:56
- Sing It Yourself Mix – 4:19
- Shep's 7" House Mix – 4:56
- Shep's House Mix – 8:45
- Shep's House Dub – 6:05
- Slammin' 7" R&B Mix – 4:17
- Slammin' R&B Mix – 7:45
- Slammin' Dub – 5:48
- The Bass You Much Mix/That Bass You Much Mix – 4:20

== Track listings ==
International 7" single
Japan 3" CD
International cassette single

1. "Miss You Much" (7" edit)
2. "You Need Me"

Japan maxi CD single

1. "Miss You Much" (7" edit) – 3:57
2. "Miss You Much" (Mama Mix) – 7:24
3. "Miss You Much" (Slammin' R&B Mix) – 7:37
4. "Miss You Much" (Shep's House Mix) – 8:38
5. "Miss You Much" (Shep's House Dub) – 6:03
6. "Miss You Much" (Slammin' Dub) – 5:45
7. "Miss You Much" (7" R&B Remix) – 4:17
8. "Miss You Much" (7" House Mix) – 4:56
9. "Miss You Much" (7" Slammin' R&B Mix) – 4:28
10. "Miss You Much" (That Bass You Much Mix) – 4:22
11. "Miss You Much" (Oh I Like That Mix) – 4:58
12. "Miss You Much" (Sing It Yourself Mix) – 4:21
13. "Miss You Much" (a cappella) – 3:26

UK maxi CD single

1. "Miss You Much" (7" edit)
2. "Miss You Much" (Mama Mix)
3. "You Need Me"

UK 12" single

1. "Miss You Much" (Mama Mix)
2. "Miss You Much" (Oh I Like That Mix)
3. "You Need Me"

International 12" single

1. "Miss You Much" (Mama Mix)
2. "Miss You Much" (Sing It Yourself Mix)
3. "Miss You Much" (Oh I Like That Mix)
4. "You Need Me"

International CD single

1. "Miss You Much" (7" edit)
2. "Miss You Much" (Mama Mix)
3. "Miss You Much" (Sing It Yourself Mix)
4. "You Need Me"

US 12" promo/West Germany 12" single – The Shep Pettibone Mixes

1. "Miss You Much" (Slammin' R&B Mix) – 7:45
2. "Miss You Much" (Slammin' Dub) – 5:48
3. "Miss You Much" (a cappella) – 3:25
4. "Miss You Much" (Shep's House Mix) – 8:45
5. "Miss You Much" (Shep's House Dub) – 6:05
6. "Miss You Much" (The Bass You Much Mix) – 4:20

West Germany CD maxi – The Shep Pettibone Mixes

1. "Miss You Much" (7" Slammin' R&B Mix) – 4:30
2. "Miss You Much" (7" House Mix) – 4:55
3. "Miss You Much" (7" R&B Mix) – 4:20
4. "Miss You Much" (Slammin' R&B Mix) – 7:45

Australian 12" picture disc

1. "Miss You Much" (Slammin R&B Mix)
2. "Miss You Much" (Slammin Dub)
3. "Miss You Much" (Shep's House Mix)
4. "Miss You Much" (Shep's House Dub)

== Charts ==
=== Weekly charts ===
Weekly chart performance for "Miss You Much"
Chart (1989)	Peak position
Australia (ARIA)	12
Belgium (Ultratop 50 Flanders)	21
Canada Retail Singles (The Record)	1
Canada Top Singles (RPM)	2
Canada Dance/Urban (RPM)	1
Europe (Eurochart Hot 100 Singles)	40
Finland (Suomen virallinen lista)	20
Ireland (IRMA)	22
Italy (Musica e dischi)	22
Italy Airplay (Music & Media)	2
Netherlands (Dutch Top 40)	15
Netherlands (Single Top 100)	15
New Zealand (Recorded Music NZ)	2
Switzerland (Schweizer Hitparade)	20
UK Singles (Official Charts)	22
US Billboard Hot 100	1
US Dance Club Songs (Billboard)	1
US Dance Singles Sales (Billboard)	1
US Hot Black Singles (Billboard)	1
US Cash Box Top 100	1
US Top R&B Singles (Cash Box)	1
West Germany (GfK)	16

=== Year-end charts ===
Year-end chart performance for "Miss You Much"
Chart (1989)	Position
Australia (ARIA)	85
Canada Top Singles (RPM)	16
Canada Dance/Urban (RPM)	5
US Billboard Hot 100	5
US 12-inch Singles Sales (Billboard)	12
US Dance Club Play (Billboard)	8
US Hot Black Singles (Billboard)	22
US Cash Box Top 100	17
US Top R&B Singles (Cash Box)	1

== Certifications ==
Region	Certification	Certified units/sales
Canada (Music Canada)	Gold	50,000^{^}
United States (RIAA)	Platinum	1,000,000^{^}
^{^} Shipments figures based on certification alone.

== Release history ==
Region	Date	Format(s)	Label(s)	Ref.
United States	August 16, 1989	Radio	A&M	
United Kingdom	August 21, 1989	7-inch vinyl; 12-inch vinyl; CD; cassette	A&M; Breakout	
Japan	September 6, 1989	Mini-CD	A&M	
Japan	March 21, 1990	Maxi-CD	A&M	

== See also ==
- List of Hot Black Singles number ones of 1989
- List of Billboard number-one dance singles of 1989

== Bibliography ==
- Dickerson, James (1998). Women On Top: The Quiet Revolution That's Rocking the American Music Industry. Billboard Books. ISBN 978-0-8230-8489-0.
