= Make Me (Janet Jackson song) =

Single by Janet Jackson

from the album Number Ones
- Released: September 22, 2009
- Recorded: 2009
- Genre: Nu-disco; funk
- Length: 3:40
- Label: A&M
- Songwriters: Janet Jackson; Rodney Jerkins; Thomas Lumpkins; Michaela Shiloh; Bernard Edwards; Nile Rodgers
- Producers: Janet Jackson; Darkchild

Janet Jackson singles chronology
"Can't B Good" (2008)	"Make Me" (2009)	"Nothing" (2010)

Music video
- "Make Me" on YouTube

"Make Me" is a song by American singer-songwriter Janet Jackson included on her second greatest hits compilation Number Ones (2009). The song was written by Jackson, Rodney "Darkchild" Jerkins, Thomas Lumpkins, and Michaela Shiloh. Initially presented as an audio stream to those who joined her web site's official mailing list in September 2009, it was released via digital download later that month, on September 22, 2009, as the lead and only single from Number Ones by A&M Records.

"Make Me" features an up-tempo disco beat and lyrical hook reminiscent of her material from the 1980s. The song received critical praise, with music critics comparing the song favorably to her hit "All for You" (2001) and her brother Michael Jackson's 1979 number one single "Don't Stop 'til You Get Enough", both of which carry a distinct disco beat. It became her 19th number one hit single on the Billboard's Hot Dance Club Songs chart, and made her the first artist to earn number one singles on the chart across four decades. The song's music video, directed by Robert Hales, was shot entirely in black and white, and it received positive critical reception for its vintage aesthetic.

== Background ==
In 2009, the 26th Annual MTV Video Music Awards were held a few months after Jackson's brother Michael Jackson died on June 25, 2009. The awards dedicated the night to her brother with a retro-music video montage, and pop singer Madonna opened the show with a speech about Jackson. Additionally, Janet Jackson made an appearance to perform the 1995 song "Scream". Following the awards show on September 13, 2009, a song titled "Make Me" was released on Jackson's official website as an audio stream for those who joined the site's e-mail newsletter. On September 22, it was released as a digital download for purchase. Although claims were made that "Make Me" is a tribute song to Michael's 1979 single "Don't Stop 'Til You Get Enough", Jackson later stated in an interview with Ryan Seacrest it is not, despite the similarity of the lyrics in the song's outro.

"Make Me" was written by Janet Jackson, Rodney "Darkchild" Jerkins, Thomas Lumpkins, and Michaela Shiloh. Bernard Edwards and Nile Rodgers have also been credited as the song samples Fonzi Thornton's song "I Work For A Livin'", written and produced by them for the 1982 Soup For One motion picture soundtrack. Darkchild, who produced music from Jackson's tenth studio album Discipline (2008), co-produced the song with her. He reported to MTV that he had been working on new material with Jackson since her departure from Island Records in September 2008. Of the new material, he commented, "It's about dancing ... It's all about her. It's about [saying], 'Listen, if you really want to get with me, you gotta make me feel a certain way' ... We're going back to basics and fundamental sounds of Janet. We're trying to target her fans [by making] the records that her fans will embrace." In October 2009, Universal Music Enterprises issued a press release stating "Make Me" would be included in Jackson's second greatest hits album, Number Ones, a compilation of her 33 global number one singles.

== Reception ==
=== Critical reception ===
Following her performance at the VMA's, Gil Kaufman of MTV reported, "Janet gave the ultimate thank you to her beloved sibling by posting a new single, 'Make Me,' on her Web site ... Easing up on the darker S&M themes of her recent albums, 'Make Me' is a fun, breezy tune with an elastic disco beat" adding that "[t]he chorus twists Michael's refrain into a Janet-worthy, sexy come-on, with the lyrics, 'Don't stop 'til you get it up'." Clover Hope of Vibe magazine commented: "Fun, rhythmic, buoyant—it's the type of rebound we'd hoped for with 2008's Discipline, where Jackson teamed up with Rodney Jerkins in search of a youthful edge that only seemed to date her. They got it right here though, as Jerkins taps into Janet's sense of fanciful pleasure, rewinding time in a Janet way." Jerkins also had Larry Ryckman and Ari Blitz Master "Make Me" with AfterMaster HD Audio which gave it a uniquely powerful presence. Michael Menachem of Billboard magazine hailed the song as her best dance recording since "All for You" (2001). Noting the single's similarity to Michael Jackson's disco themed "Don't Stop Til You Get Enough" from Off the Wall, Menachem comments "[it] isn't just Jackson's best dance song in years—it's a hit that would make her brother proud." Glenn Gamboa of Newsday referred to the single as "remarkably upbeat, blending a bit of the playfulness that has been missing in her recent work with a high-energy Euro-dance backdrop."

=== Chart performance ===
Entering at number fifty, "Make Me" became her nineteenth number one hit single on the Billboard Hot Dance Club Songs chart. It became her 19th number one hit single on the chart, and made her the first artist to earn number one singles on the chart across four decades. Following its peak on the Dance/Club chart, it entered the Hot R&B/Hip-Hop Songs at number ninety-one, eventually peaking at number seventy-one. In the UK, the single become her first release since her collaboration with Nelly on "Call on Me" in 2006 to chart inside the Top 75.

== Music video ==
A music video for the song was directed by Robert Hales and choreographed by Gil Duldulao. It premiered on 20/20 on November 20, 2009. Nick Levine from Digital Spy commented: "There's lots of dancing, Janet looks fantastic and the whole thing's as slick as a classic Jam & Lewis groove. In short? A thoroughly enjoyable way to spend the next three-and-a-half-minutes. Right, back to 'Escapade' for us". Jefferson Reid and Lindsay Miller of E! Online stated the video "features a vintage Janet vibe, including space-age shoulder pads and countless hat-tips to brother Michael."

== Live performances ==
While promoting her second greatest hits album Number Ones, the singer performed an eight-minute medley of six hits during the American Music Awards of 2009. It included "Control", "Miss You Much", "What Have You Done for Me Lately", "If", "Make Me", and finished with "Together Again". At the end of the performance, the singer received applause and standing ovation from the audience. Jackson also performed the track on The X Factor results show on December 6, 2009. She pre-recorded the performance so she could perform as the headliner of the Jingle Bell Ball in London. She closed the concert with a medley of her greatest hits including "Make Me", wearing half hareem-pant, half skirt concoction, jackets and high-top trainers. Jackson also included the song in her performance at the 2010 Essence Music Festival, held in New Orleans, Louisiana. The song was also included on the Number Ones: Up Close and Personal tour which happened the following year. Jackson also included the song on her 2024 Together Again Tour.

== Track listing ==
Digital Single

1. "Make Me" (Album Version) - 3:38
2. "Make Me" (Moto Blanco Club Mix) - 7:11
3. "Make Me" (Bimbo Jones Club Mix) - 6:46
4. "Make Me" (Ralphi Rosario Vocal Club Mix) - 9:20
5. "Make Me" (Ralphi's Martini Mix) - 7:44
6. "Make Me" (Craig J's Get It Up! Mix) - 6:46
7. "Make Me" (DJ Dan Extended Vocal Mix) - 4:27
8. "Make Me" (DJ Dan Peaktime Mix) - 6:13
9. "Make Me" (Dave Aude Club Mix) - 8:01
10. "Make Me" (Bimbo Jones Dub) - 8:25

== Charts ==
=== Weekly charts ===
Weekly chart performance for "Make Me"
Chart (2009–10)	Peak position
Global Dance Tracks (Billboard)	12
Japan Hot 100	17
South Korea Singles Chart	28
UK Singles (Official Charts)	73
US Dance Club Songs (Billboard)	1
US Hot R&B/Hip-Hop Songs (Billboard)	71

=== Year-end charts ===
2010 year-end chart performance for "Make Me"
Year-end chart (2010)	Peak position
US Hot Dance Club Songs (Billboard)	13

== See also ==
- List of number-one dance singles of 2010 (U.S.)
