= Janet Jackson singles discography =

Singles recorded by American singer

Janet Jackson discography
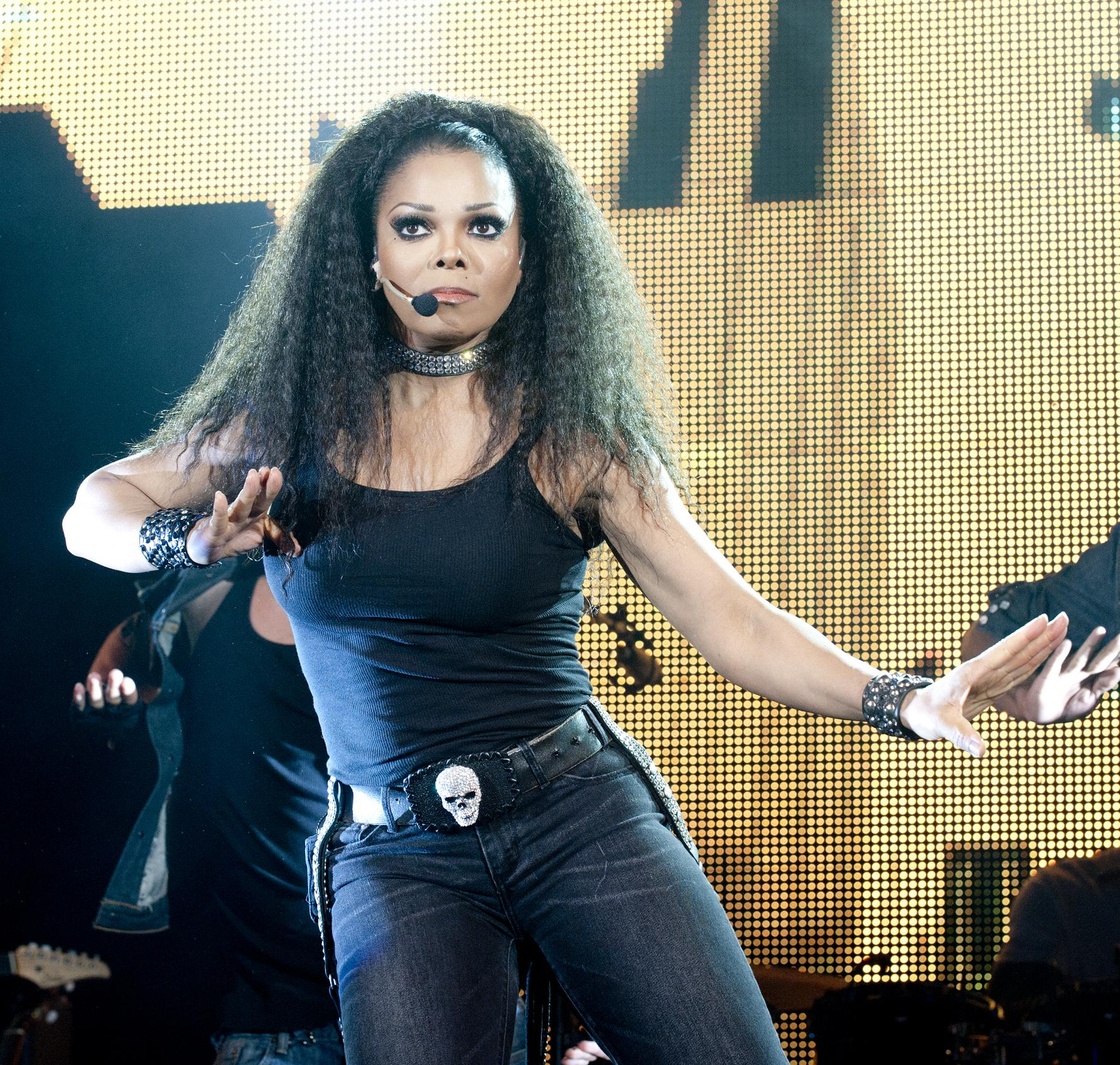
- Jackson performing on her 2011 Number Ones, Up Close and Personal World Tour
- Singles: 70
- Promotional singles: 8
- Other charted songs: 4

This is the singles discography of American singer Janet Jackson. Jackson has sold more than 100 million records worldwide. Billboard ranked her as the third greatest female artist of all time in Billboard Hot 100 history (behind Madonna and Mariah Carey). Jackson's ten career number one singles on the US Billboard Hot 100 are the eighth most number one singles by a recording artist.

Signing with A&M Records in 1982 at age 15, her first entry on the Billboard Hot 100 was "Young Love", off her self-titled debut album. The single reached number 64 on the chart, becoming only a moderate success. Her follow-up album, Dream Street (1984) failed to produce a Hot 100 single. Her third album, Control (1986) was her breakthrough album, producing six top 20 singles on the Billboard Hot 100, including five in the top ten, with the song "When I Think of You" becoming her first number one single on the chart.

Her fourth album, Janet Jackson's Rhythm Nation 1814 (1989), remains the only album in history to produce seven consecutive top five singles on the Billboard Hot 100, including four number ones: "Miss You Much", "Escapade", "Black Cat" and "Love Will Never Do (Without You)". After signing with Virgin Records in 1991, Jackson released her fifth album, Janet, in 1993. The album produced six top ten singles, including the number-one hits "That's the Way Love Goes" and "Again", with the former becoming her most successful charting single to date.

In 1995, Jackson became the first female artist to have two songs debut inside the top ten of the Hot 100, with the Michael Jackson duet "Scream" and "Runaway". Two years later, Jackson's sixth album, The Velvet Rope (1997) produced two top ten singles, the number-one hit "Together Again" and the Blackstreet-featured remix of "I Get Lonely", the latter of which gave Jackson an unprecedented 18th top ten hit in a row, which made her the only artist to have that many.

After releasing the number one single "Doesn't Really Matter", off the soundtrack to Nutty Professor II: The Klumps (2000), Jackson released her seventh studio album, All for You, in 2001. The album launched two of her most recent top ten singles to date: "All for You", which topped the Billboard Hot 100 for seven weeks, becoming her tenth and final number one single, and "Someone to Call My Lover", her 27th top ten hit.

Jackson struggled to have success on the charts following the fallout of her controversial performance at the Super Bowl XXXVIII halftime show in February 2004. Jackson's eighth studio release, Damita Jo (2004), was her first album in two decades to not produce a top 40 single. Jackson returned to the top 40 just twice afterwards with the moderate hits "Call on Me" (2006) and "Feedback" (2008). After a seven-year hiatus, Jackson released her eleventh and latest studio album, Unbreakable (2015), which produced her 40th milestone Billboard Hot 100 entry, "No Sleeep", featuring J. Cole.

Jackson has only charted more sporadically since then with the Daddy Yankee-featured "Made for Now" (2018) and as a sampled credit on the Cardi B song, "Principal" (2025).

== 1980s ==
Title	Year	Peak chart positions										Certifications	Album
Title	Year	US	US R&B	AUS	CAN	GER	IRL	NLD	NZ	SWI	UK	Certifications	Album
"Young Love"	1982	64	6	—	—	—	—	—	16	—	—		Janet Jackson
"Come Give Your Love to Me"	1983	58	17	—	—	—	—	—	—	—	169		Janet Jackson
"Say You Do"	1983	—	15	—	—	—	—	—	—	—	—		Janet Jackson
"Love and My Best Friend"	1983	—	—	—	—	—	—	—	—	—	—		Janet Jackson
"Don't Mess Up This Good Thing"	1983	—	—	—	—	—	—	—	—	—	140		Janet Jackson
"Don't Stand Another Chance"	1984	— (Note: "Don't Stand Another Chance" did not enter the Billboard Hot 100, but peaked at #1 on the Bubbling Under Hot 100 Singles chart.)	9	—	—	—	—	—	—	—	—		Dream Street
"Two to the Power of Love" (with Cliff Richard)	1984	—	—	—	—	—	—	—	—	—	83		Dream Street
"Fast Girls"	1984	—	40	—	—	—	—	—	—	—	—		Dream Street
"What Have You Done for Me Lately"	1986	4	1	6	6	8	10	1	27	9	3	RIAA: Gold; BPI: Silver; MC: Gold	Control
"Nasty"	1986	3	1	17	8	9	20	5	8	8	19	RIAA: Platinum; MC: Gold	Control
"When I Think of You"	1986	1	3	53	6	36	10	2	23	—	10	RIAA: Platinum	Control
"Control"	1986	5	1	82	17	—	—	9	16	—	42	RIAA: Gold	Control
"Let's Wait Awhile"	1987	2	1	21	11	34	4	14	26	27	3	BPI Silver	Control
"The Pleasure Principle"	1987	14	1	50	35	—	23	25	37	—	24		Control
"Funny How Time Flies (When You're Having Fun)"	1987	—	—	—	—	—	24	—	—	—	59		Control
"Miss You Much"	1989	1	1	12	2	16	22	15	2	20	22	RIAA: Platinum; MC: Gold	Janet Jackson's Rhythm; Nation 1814
"Rhythm Nation"	1989	2	1	56	6	83	19	9	17	22	23	RIAA: Platinum	Janet Jackson's Rhythm; Nation 1814
"—" denotes a title that did not chart, or was not released in that territory.

== 1990s ==
Title	Year	Peak chart positions											Certifications	Album
Title	Year	US	US R&B	AUS	CAN	FRA	GER	IRL	NLD	NZ	SWI	UK	Certifications	Album
"Escapade"	1990	1	1	25	1	23	17	13	17	15	—	17	RIAA: Platinum	Janet Jackson's Rhythm; Nation 1814
"Alright" (solo or featuring Heavy D)	1990	4	2	100	6	—	43	14	35	28	—	20	RIAA: Gold	Janet Jackson's Rhythm; Nation 1814
"Come Back to Me"	1990	2	2	79	3	—	—	21	—	—	—	20		Janet Jackson's Rhythm; Nation 1814
"Black Cat"	1990	1	10	6	4	—	34	11	18	25	10	15	RIAA: Gold; ARIA: Gold	Janet Jackson's Rhythm; Nation 1814
"Love Will Never Do (Without You)"	1990	1	3	14	1	—	—	22	32	27	—	34	RIAA: Gold	Janet Jackson's Rhythm; Nation 1814
"State of the World"	1991	— (Note: "State of the World" did not enter the Billboard Hot 100, but peaked at number 5 on the Radio Songs chart.)	—	94	14	—	—	—	—	—	—	—		Janet Jackson's Rhythm; Nation 1814
"The Best Things in Life Are Free" (with Luther Vandross featuring Bell Biv DeVoe and Ralph Tresvant)	1992	10	1	2	8	—	8	6	20	6	32	2	ARIA: Platinum; BPI: Silver	Mo' Money: Original Motion Picture Soundtrack
"That's the Way Love Goes"	1993	1	1	1	1	15	9	8	7	1	11	2	RIAA: 2× Platinum; ARIA: Platinum; RMNZ: Gold; BPI: Silver	Janet
"If"	1993	4	3	18	3	—	25	—	10	8	27	14	RIAA: Platinum	Janet
"Again"	1993	1	7	19	2	—	29	12	20	13	20	6	RIAA: Platinum	Janet
"Because of Love"	1994	10	9	25	10	—	72	—	39	23	—	19		Janet
"Any Time, Any Place"	1994	2	1	37	21	—	—	—	—	20	—	13	RIAA: Platinum	Janet
"And On and On"	1994	2	1	—	—	—	—	—	—	—	—	—		Janet
"Throb"	1994	— (Note: "Throb" did not enter the Billboard Hot 100, but peaked at number 66 on the Radio Songs chart.)	—	—	—	—	—	—	—	—	—	—		Janet
"You Want This" (featuring MC Lyte)	1994	8	9	16	15	—	90	—	37	11	—	14	RIAA: Gold	Janet
"Whoops Now/What'll I Do"	1995	—	—	49	—	5	11	16	38	1	15	9	SNEP: Silver	Janet
"What'll I Do"	1995	—	—	14	—	—	—	—	—	—	—	—		Janet
"Scream" (duet with Michael Jackson)	1995	5	2	2	5	4	8	6	4	1	3	3	RIAA: Platinum; ARIA: Gold; RMNZ: Gold	HIStory: Past, Present and Future, Book I
"Runaway"	1995	3	6	8	2	25	39	10	28	3	24	6	RIAA: Gold; ARIA: Gold; RMNZ: Gold	Design of a Decade: 1986–1996
"Twenty Foreplay"	1995	—	—	29	27	—	74	—	41	38	—	22		Design of a Decade: 1986–1996
"Got 'til It's Gone" (featuring Q-Tip and Joni Mitchell)	1997	—	1	10	19	11	1	1	9	4	11	6	ARIA: Gold; BPI: Silver; RMNZ: Gold; SNEP: Silver	The Velvet Rope
"Together Again"	1997	1	8	4	2	2	2	4	1	5	2	4	RIAA: Platinum; ARIA: Platinum; BPI: 2× Platinum; BVMI: Platinum; IFPI SWI: Gold; SNEP: Platinum; RMNZ: Gold	The Velvet Rope
"I Get Lonely" (solo or featuring Blackstreet)	1998	3	1	21	20	72	75	—	20	6	41	5	RIAA: Platinum	The Velvet Rope
"Every Time"	1998	— (Note: "Every Time" did not enter the Billboard Hot 100, but peaked at #25 on the Bubbling Under Hot 100 Singles chart.)	—	52	—	95	67	—	38	34	—	46		The Velvet Rope
"Go Deep"	1998	— (Note: "Go Deep" did not enter the Billboard Hot 100, but peaked at number 28 on the Radio Songs chart.)	10	39	2	22	72	—	54	13	—	13		The Velvet Rope
"You"	1998	16	—	—	—	—	—	—	—	—	—	—		The Velvet Rope
"—" denotes a title that did not chart, or was not released in that territory.

== 2000s ==
Title	Year	Peak chart positions											Certifications	Album
Title	Year	US	US R&B	AUS	CAN	FRA	GER	IRL	NLD	NZ	SWI	UK	Certifications	Album
"Doesn't Really Matter"	2000	1	3	28	3	40	23	21	15	27	17	5	RIAA: Gold; BPI: Silver	Nutty Professor II: The Klumps - Soundtrack and All for You
"All for You"	2001	1	1	5	1	3	16	15	15	2	7	3	RIAA: Platinum; ARIA: Platinum; BPI: Gold; SNEP: Silver; RMNZ: Gold	All for You
"Someone to Call My Lover"	2001	3	11	15	9	58	65	23	46	18	42	11		All for You
"Son of a Gun (I Betcha Think This Song Is About You)" (with Carly Simon featuring Missy Elliott)	2001	28	26	20	—	—	69	21	34	49	56	13		All for You
"Just a Little While"	2004	45	—	20	3	72	54	—	43	—	37	15		Damita Jo
"I Want You"	2004	57	18	24 (Note: "All Nite (Don't Stop)" was released as a double A-side single in Australia with "I Want You")	—	—	—	—	—	—	—	19 (Note: "All Nite (Don't Stop)" was released as a double A-side single in the UK with "I Want You")	RIAA: Platinum	Damita Jo
"All Nite (Don't Stop)"	2004	119	90	24	—	—	48	26	35	39	76	19		Damita Jo
"Call on Me" (with Nelly)	2006	25	1	—	—	41	45	20	—	11	43	18		20 Y.O.
"So Excited" (featuring Khia)	2006	90	34	—	—	—	—	—	—	—	—	—		20 Y.O.
"With U"	2006	—	65	—	—	—	—	—	—	—	—	—		20 Y.O.
"Feedback"	2007	19	39	50	3	36	40	—	59	17	51	114	RIAA: Platinum	Discipline
"Rock with U"	2008	121	—	—	—	—	—	—	—	—	—	—		Discipline
"Luv"	2008	102	34	—	—	—	—	—	—	—	—	—		Discipline
"Can't B Good"	2008	—	76	—	—	—	—	—	—	—	—	—		Discipline
"Make Me"	2009	—	71	—	—	—	—	—	—	—	—	73		Number Ones
"—" denotes a title that did not chart, or was not released in that territory.

== 2010s ==
Title	Year	Peak chart positions						Album
Title	Year	US	US R&B	AUS	CAN	FRA	UK Digital	Album
"Nothing"	2010	—	58	—	—	—	—	Why Did I Get Married Too?
"No Sleeep" (solo or featuring J. Cole)	2015	63	18	—	—	106	97	Unbreakable
"Unbreakable"	2015	—	—	—	—	—	—	Unbreakable
"Dammn Baby"	2016	—	—	—	—	—	—	Unbreakable
"Made for Now" (with Daddy Yankee)	2018	88	36	— (Note: "Made for Now" did not enter the Australian Singles Chart (ARIA Charts), but peaked at number 40 on the Australia Digital Tracks.)	— (Note: "Made for Now" did not enter the Canadian Singles Chart, but peaked at number 29 on the Canada Hot Digital Songs.)	— (Note: "Made for Now" did not enter the France Singles Chart (SNEP), but peaked at number 33 on the France Downloads Songs.)	47	non-album single
"—" denotes a title that did not chart, or was not released in that territory.

== 2020s ==
Title	Year	Peak chart positions		Sales	Album
Title	Year	JPN Dig.	JPN Hot	Sales	Album
"Doesn't Really Matter" (Remix) (with Be:First)	2026	2	12	JPN: 8,268	Non-album single

== As featured artist ==
Title	Year	Peak chart positions										Certifications	Album
Title	Year	US	AUS	CAN	FRA	GER	IRL	NLD	NZ	SWI	UK	Certifications	Album
"Luv Me, Luv Me" (Shaggy featuring Janet Jackson)	1998	76	—	—	—	—	—	—	—	—	—		How Stella Got Her Groove Back: Music from the Motion Picture
"What's It Gonna Be?!" (Busta Rhymes featuring Janet Jackson)	1999	3	65	—	—	42	—	29	7	41	6	RIAA: Gold	Extinction Level Event: The Final World Front
"Girlfriend/Boyfriend" (with Blackstreet featuring Ja Rule and Eve)	1999	47	16	14	71	98	—	41	12	—	11		Finally
"Feel It Boy" (Beenie Man featuring Janet Jackson)	2002	28	18	15	47	72	—	33	12	40	9	ARIA: Gold; RMNZ: Gold	Tropical Storm
"Don't Worry" (Chingy featuring Janet Jackson)	2005	—	—	—	—	—	—	—	—	—	—		Powerballin'
"—" denotes a title that did not chart, or was not released in that territory.

== Other single appearances ==
Title	Year	Peak chart positions									Album
Title	Year	US	US R&B	AUS	CAN	GER	NLD	NZ	SWI	UK	Album
"Diamonds" (Herb Alpert) (Note: While Jackson appears on "Diamonds", Billboard considers it a Herb Alpert single, and the track therefore does not count towards her Hot 100 chart totals; it does count towards her R&B totals.)	1987	5	1	47	11	15	3	31	23	27	Keep Your Eye on Me
"Making Love in the Rain" (Herb Alpert) (Note: "Making Love in the Rain" features backing vocals by Jackson, and it does not contribute to her chart statistics.)	1987	35	7	—	—	—	94	—	—	—	Keep Your Eye on Me
"2300 Jackson Street" (As The Jacksons)	1989	—	9	—	—	—	39	—	—	76	2300 Jackson Street
"We Are the World 25 for Haiti" (As part of Artists for Haiti)	2010	2	—	18	3	—	—	8	—	50	Non-album single
"—" denotes a title that did not chart, or was not released in that territory.

== Promotional singles ==
Year	Title	Chart positions	Album
Year	Title	US Dance	Album
1985	"Start Anew"	—	Control (Japanese Edition)
1999	"Ask for More"	—	non album single / Pepsi Commercial
2001	"Come On Get Up"	—	All for You
2003	"Janet Megamix 04"	3	non album single / 2004 Super Bowl halftime show
2004	"R&B Junkie"	—	Damita Jo
2006	"Enjoy"	—	20 Y.O.
2015	"Burnitup!" (featuring Missy Elliott)	—	Unbreakable
2016	"The Great Forever"	—	Unbreakable

== Other charted songs ==
Title	Year	Peak chart positions		Album
Title	Year	US	US R&B	Album
"Principal" (Cardi B featuring Janet Jackson)	2025	92	26	Am I the Drama?

== See also ==
- Janet Jackson albums discography
- Janet Jackson videography
- List of awards and nominations received by Janet Jackson
- List of best selling music artists
- List of best-selling albums by women
- List of number-one hits (United States)
- List of artists who reached number one on the Hot 100 (U.S.)
- List of number-one dance hits (United States)
- List of artists who reached number one on the U.S. Dance chart
