= Janet Jackson albums discography =

Recording collections by American singer

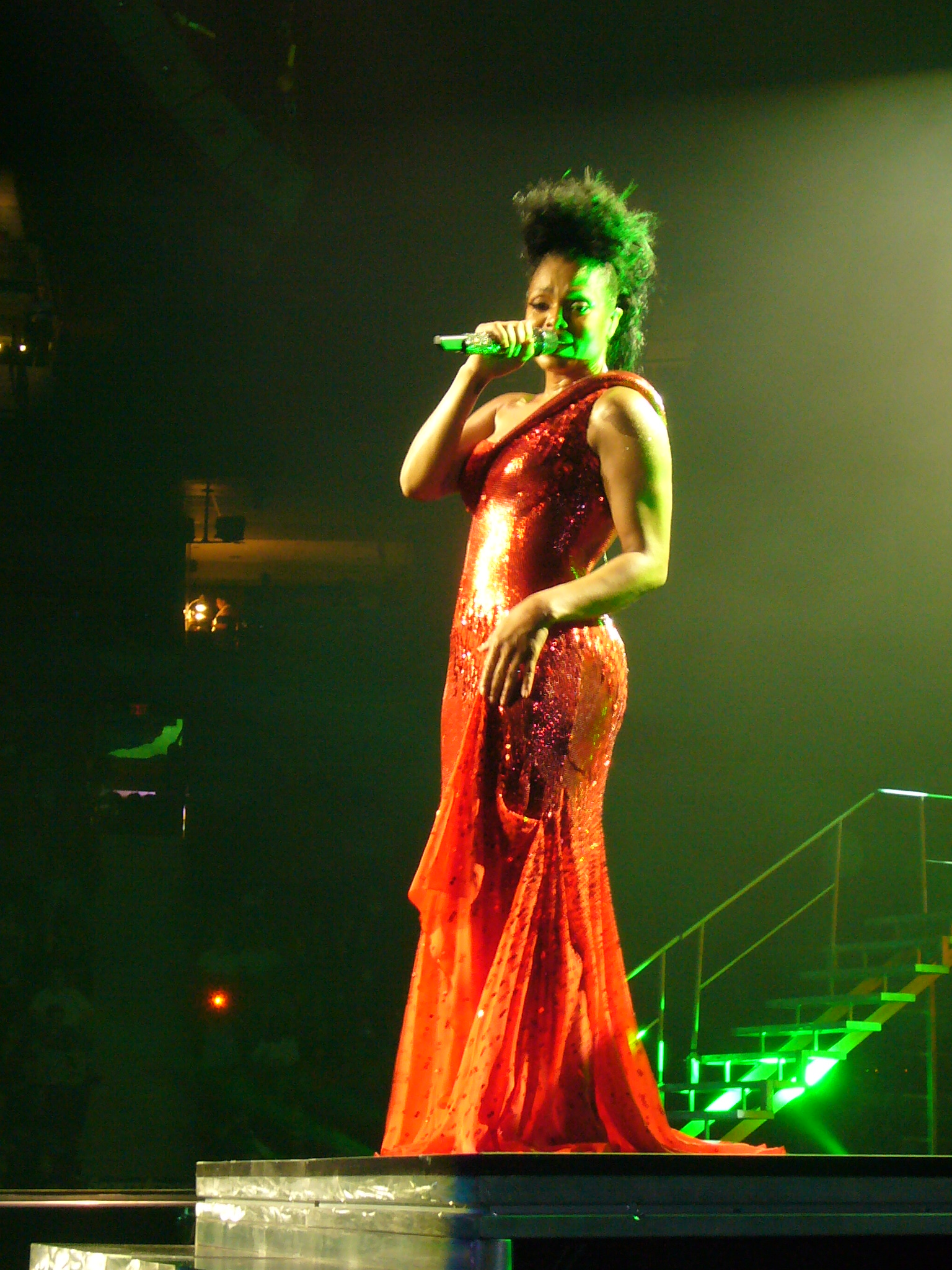
- Jackson performing on her 2008 Rock Witchu Tour
- Studio albums: 11
- Compilation albums: 4
- Remix albums: 2

The albums discography of American singer Janet Jackson consists of eleven studio albums, four compilation albums, and two remix albums. When she was fifteen, her father arranged a contract for her with A&M Records. Her debut album, Janet Jackson (1982), peaked at number 64 on the US Billboard 200 chart and sold 250,000 copies in the United States. Her next album, Dream Street (1984), peaked at number 147 on the Billboard 200, a weaker effort than her previous album. Her third album, Control (1986), became known as her breakthrough album, topping the Billboard 200 and selling over 10 million copies worldwide. Her fourth album, Rhythm Nation 1814 (1989), topped the Billboard 200 for four consecutive weeks and sold three million copies within the first four months of its release. The album went on to produce seven consecutive top 5 hits, four of them reaching the top spot on the US Billboard Hot 100 in three separate calendar years, a record yet to be broken. The album was certified 6× Platinum by the Recording Industry Association of America (RIAA), and has sold over 12 million copies worldwide.

After being approached personally by Virgin Records owner Richard Branson, and signing the multi-million dollar contract with the label, she released her fifth studio album, Janet (1993). The album debuted at number one on the Billboard 200 with the largest first-week sales in history for a female artist at the time. It became Jackson's third consecutive album to top the chart, as well as reaching the number one position in Australia, New Zealand and the UK. Certified 6× platinum by the RIAA, it sold over 20 million copies worldwide. In 1995, Jackson released her first compilation album, Design of a Decade: 1986–1996. It was certified double platinum by the RIAA. In 1996, Jackson received an $80 million dollar contract, making her the world's highest paid musical act for the second time in her career. Following the contract was her sixth album The Velvet Rope (1997). The album produced one of the biggest hits of her career, "Together Again". The Velvet Rope was certified 3× Platinum in the US and sold over ten million copies worldwide.

In 2001, Jackson released her seventh album, All for You. The album debuted at number one on the US Billboard 200 and the Top R&B/Hip-Hop Albums chart, selling 605,128 copies in its first week. It was Jackson's fifth straight number one debut in the United States, with the biggest opening week sales of her career. The album went on to be certified 2× Platinum by the RIAA and sell over 7 million copies worldwide. In 2004, Jackson released her next album, Damita Jo. The album debuted at number two on the Billboard 200 with first-week sales of 381,000 copies. It was Jackson's weakest effort since Dream Street, believed to be due to blacklisting by MTV and radio stations due to the Super Bowl XXXVIII halftime show controversy. Despite weaker sales then her previous efforts, the album was certified Platinum by the RIAA and sold an estimated 3 million copies worldwide. In 2006, Jackson released her ninth studio album, 20 Y.O., which debuted at number two on the Billboard 200 with 297,000 copies sold in its first week, making it Jackson's eighth consecutive top three debut and second consecutive number two debut on the chart. It is also Jackson's eighth consecutive platinum album; it went on to sell 1.5 million copies worldwide. In 2008, Jackson released her tenth studio album, Discipline. The album debuted at number one on the Billboard 200 with 181,000 copies sold, and has since sold over 600,000 copies.

Jackson is listed as the eleventh best-selling female recording artist in the US. She has attained 5 consecutive Top Billboard Albums and 7 overall. She has 40 million certified albums and singles in the United States according to the RIAA. Overall she has sold over 100 million copies of her albums and singles, which makes her one of the best-selling music artists.

== Studio albums ==
List of studio albums, with selected details, chart positions, sales figures and certifications
Title	Details	Peak chart positions										Sales	Certifications
Title	Details	US	AUS	CAN	FRA	GER	JPN	NLD	NZ	SWI	UK	Sales	Certifications
Janet Jackson	Released: September 1982; Label: A&M; Formats: CD, cassette, LP	63	—	—	—	—	—	—	44	—	—	World: 300,000; US: 250,000 (Note: "BMG Club Sales were significantly popular in the 1990s and early 2000s, but Nielsen SoundScan does not count these sales in their tracking; RIAA, however, does.)	
Dream Street	Released: September 1984; Label: A&M; Formats: CD, cassette, LP	147	—	—	—	—	—	—	—	—	—	US: 250,000	
Control	Released: February 4, 1986; Label: A&M; Formats: CD, cassette, LP	1	25	11	—	36	57	7	5	28	8	World: 10,000,000; US: 5,000,000; UK: 324,000	RIAA: 5× Platinum; BPI: Platinum; MC: Platinum; RMNZ: Gold
Janet Jackson's Rhythm Nation 1814	Released: September 19, 1989; Label: A&M; Formats: CD, cassette, LP	1	1	5	—	39	8	28	9	23	4	World: 12,000,000; US: 7,000,000; JPN: 500,000; UK: 281,000	RIAA: 6× Platinum; ARIA: 2× Platinum; BPI: Platinum; IFPI SWI: Gold; MC: Platinum; RIAJ: Gold; RMNZ: Gold
Janet.	Released: May 18, 1993; Label: Virgin; Formats: CD, cassette, LP	1	1	1	16	5	5	4	1	10	1	World: 14,000,000; US: 7,895,000; UK: 437,000	RIAA: 6× Platinum; ARIA: 2× Platinum; BPI: 2× Platinum; BVMI: Gold; IFPI SWI: Gold; MC: 3× Platinum; SNEP: 2× Gold; RIAJ: Platinum; RMNZ: Platinum
The Velvet Rope	Released: October 7, 1997; Label: Virgin; Formats: CD, cassette, LP	1	4	2	5	5	10	3	8	5	6	World: 8,000,000; US: 3,650,000; UK: 367,000	RIAA: 3× Platinum; ARIA: 2× Platinum; BPI: Platinum; BVMI: Gold; IFPI SWI: Platinum; MC: 3× Platinum; SNEP: Platinum; RIAJ: Platinum; RMNZ: Platinum
All for You	Released: April 24, 2001; Label: Virgin; Formats: CD, cassette, LP	1	3	1	2	3	4	4	6	2	2	World: 7,000,000; US: 3,207,000; UK: 198,000	RIAA: 2× Platinum; ARIA: Gold; BPI: Gold; BVMI: Gold; IFPI SWI: Gold; MC: 3× Platinum; SNEP: Gold; RIAJ: 3× Platinum; RMNZ: Gold
Damita Jo	Released: March 30, 2004; Label: Virgin; Formats: CD, cassette, LP	2	18	7	35	21	10	23	50	34	32	World: 3,000,000; US: 1,002,000	RIAA: Platinum; BPI: Silver; MC: Platinum; RIAJ: Gold
20 Y.O.	Released: September 22, 2006; Label: Virgin; Formats: CD, cassette, LP, digital download	2	55	4	32	46	7	34	—	35	63	World: 1,500,000; US: 679,000	RIAA: Platinum; RIAJ: Gold
Discipline	Released: February 25, 2008; Label: Island; Formats: CD, LP, digital download	1	16	3	43	38	9	28	35	9	63	US: 456,000	RIAJ: Gold
Unbreakable	Released: October 2, 2015; Label: Rhythm Nation, BMG; Formats: CD, LP, digital download	1	11	1	28	34	18	12	—	28	11	US: 384,000; FRA: 5,000	
"—" denotes a recording that did not chart or was not released in that territory.

== Remix albums ==
Title	Album details	Peak chart positions						Certifications
Title	Album details	AUS	GER	JPN	NLD	SWI	UK	Certifications
Control: The Remixes	Released: November 6, 1987; Label: A&M; Formats: CD, cassette, LP	—	—	—	—	—	20	BPI: Gold
Janet. Remixed	Released: March 13, 1995; Label: Virgin; Formats: CD, cassette, LP	64	26	61	29	21	15	
"—" denotes items that did not chart or were not released.

== Compilations ==
List of compilation albums, with selected chart positions, sales figures and certifications
Title	Details	Peak chart positions										Sales	Certifications
Title	Details	US	AUS	CAN	FRA	GER	JPN	NLD	NZ	SWI	UK	Sales	Certifications
Design of a Decade: 1986–1996	Released: October 10, 1995; Label: A&M; Formats: CD, cassette, LP	3	2	5	2	10	4	8	1	6	2	US: 3,922,000; UK: 529,000	RIAA: 2× Platinum; ARIA: 4× Platinum; BPI: 2× Platinum; BVMI: Gold; IFPI SWI: Gold; MC: Platinum; RIAJ: Platinum; RMNZ: Platinum
Number Ones / The Best	Released: November 17, 2009; Label: A&M, Universal Music Enterprises; Formats: CD, digital download	22	—	43	—	—	20	—	—	—	28	US: 273,000	BPI: Gold
Icon: Number Ones	Released: August 31, 2010; Label: A&M, Universal Music Enterprises; Formats: CD, digital download	—	—	—	—	—	—	—	—	—	—		
Japanese Singles Collection -Greatest Hits-	Released: August 24, 2022; Label: Universal Music Japan; Formats: CD+DVD	—	—	—	—	—	25	—	—	—	—	JPN: 1,919	
"—" denotes items that did not chart or were not released.

== See also ==
- Janet Jackson singles discography
- Janet Jackson videography
- List of awards and nominations received by Janet Jackson
- List of best-selling music artists
- List of best-selling albums by women
- List of number-one hits (United States)
- List of artists who reached number one on the Hot 100 (U.S.)
- List of number-one dance hits (United States)
- List of artists who reached number one on the U.S. Dance chart
