= Janet Jackson (disambiguation) =

Janet Jackson (born 1966) is an American singer.

Janet Jackson may also refer to:

- Janet Jackson (album), her self-titled 1982 studio album
- Janet Jackson (golfer) (1891–1960), Irish golfer
- Janet Jackson (TV series), a documentary television series
- Janet E. Jackson, American judge and nonprofit chief executive
