= Design of a Decade: 1986–1996 =

- North American cover

Greatest hits album by Janet Jackson
- Released: October 2, 1995
- Recorded: 1985–1995
- Genres: Pop; R&B
- Length: 75:28
- Label: A&M
- Producers: Jimmy Jam and Terry Lewis; Janet Jackson; Jellybean Johnson

Janet Jackson chronology
Janet Remixed (1995)	Design of a Decade: 1986–1996 (1995)	The Velvet Rope (1997)

Janet Jackson video chronology
Janet (1994)	Design of a Decade: 1986–1996 (1995)	The Velvet Rope Tour: Live in Concert (1999)

Singles from Design of a Decade: 1986–1996
- 1. "Runaway" Released: August 29, 1995; 2. "The Best Things In Life Are Free" Released: December 4, 1995; 3. "Twenty Foreplay" Released: March 25, 1996

Design of a Decade: 1986–1996 is the first greatest hits album by American singer Janet Jackson. It was released on October 2, 1995, by A&M Records. The album was issued through A&M as Jackson's contract with Virgin Records allotted her the option to leave the label following the release of her fifth studio album Janet (1993). The compilation features 14 of Jackson's singles from her three previous albums—Control (1986), Janet Jackson's Rhythm Nation 1814 (1989), and Janet—as well as two new tracks, "Runaway" and "Twenty Foreplay". The latter is a mid-tempo ballad with funk elements, which is a play on words with "twenty-four hours" and "foreplay". The release of the collection was accompanied by a same-titled home video release.

Design of a Decade: 1986–1996 received positive reviews from music critics, who cited the number of hit singles on the record, but many noted its misleading title as the album's content predominantly spanned a five-year period. It was well received commercially, reaching number three on the US Billboard 200 and was certified double platinum by the Recording Industry Association of America (RIAA). The record also peaked inside the top ten in several countries worldwide, including Australia, Canada, Ireland, Japan, and the United Kingdom.

== Background and content ==
In 1991, Jackson fulfilled her contract with A&M Records, signing a multimillion-dollar contract with Virgin Records estimated between $32 million and $50 million, with media outlets proclaiming her the highest paid recording artist at the time. Jackson's fifth studio album with Virgin, Janet—stylized as janet. and read "Janet, period"—was released in May 1993. The record was a commercial success—opening at number one in the United States, making the singer the first female artist in the Nielsen SoundScan era to do so and second overall—and sold over 14 million copies worldwide. Six singles were released from Janet, with two of them topping the Billboard Hot 100: "That's the Way Love Goes" and "Again". The former won the Grammy Award for Best R&B Song category at the 36th Annual Grammy Awards, while the latter received a nomination for a Best Original Song at the 66th Academy Awards.

As Jackson's contract with Virgin allotted her the option to leave the label during this time, she returned to A&M in order to release Design of a Decade: 1986–1996, her first compilation album. Billboard magazine reported that DreamWorks SKG and A&M were interested in signing with her. A&M president Al Cafaro stated: "We've always thought Janet was an A&M artist... And we would love to sign her if she is available. This project has reminded us how much fun she is to work with." The release contained fourteen digitally remastered singles, as well as two new songs — "Runaway" and "Twenty Foreplay" — written with longtime collaborators Jimmy Jam and Terry Lewis. The former is a pop and dance song which draws influences of Middle Eastern music. It was originally created to be a possible duet with Jackson's brother Michael, but they chose to record "Scream" together instead.

== Release ==
To release Design of a Decade: 1986–1996, A&M provided a "very aggressive but serious marketing plan", which included "a multimillon-dollar worldwide marketing plan that [involved], syndicated and local TV advertising, as well as print ads in a number of consumer publications, including Seventeen, Us, Rolling Stone, Vanity Fair, Jet, Vibe and Essence." The compilation was first released internationally on October 2, 1995, before a release took place on October 10 in North America; a special focus was put on the international release, as the record company felt that it needed to explore Jackson's full potential on a global level. A total of four different versions for the collection were released in various regions, three of which have distinctly different covers designed to appeal to her fan base in particular regions. Both the international release and the Japanese version contained two additional songs: "The Best Things In Life Are Free", a duet with Luther Vandross, and "Whoops Now". In Australia, the record included the Frankie Knuckles and David Morales mix of the former, whereas the Japanese and international edition contained the C.J. Mackintosh version of the song. All versions featured a 24-page booklet featuring new pictures and an interview with Jackson. A video compilation was also released on the same day, on VHS, LaserDisc and Video CD, containing a music video for each song on the album, with the exception of "Twenty Foreplay".

== Critical reception ==
Professional ratings
Review scores
Source	Rating
AllMusic	4.5/5 stars
Calgary Herald	3.5/5 stars
The Charlotte Observer	3/4 stars
Chester Chronicle	9/10
Entertainment Weekly	B+
The Knoxville News-Sentinel	4/5 stars
The San Francisco Examiner	4/5 stars
Smash Hits	4/5 stars
Spin	7/10 stars
St. Petersburg Times	4/4 stars
The Village Voice	A−

Design of a Decade: 1986–1996 received positive reviews from music critics. Gil L. Robertson IV from Cash Box described the package as "a treasure trove for all who like their music hot and sweet", noting how "all the songs here have been enormous hits" and writing that the new tracks "aptly showcase Jackson's continued evolution as a strong and highly-focused adult performer". Chester Chronicle's Terry Underhill called the album as "one of the best compilations albums of the year", and asserted it "will be an enormous success and deserves to be." Robert Christgau of The Village Voice gave it an A− rating, saying, "Those who begrudge her the place she's earned in the pop cosmos have some catching up to do." James Muretich from Calgary Herald described Jackson as "the funkiest of females on the recording scene", as "in the past 10 years, Janet has moved out from the shadow of Mikey and proves that she can churn out one slick soul hit after another"; he also commented that the new songs showed that "Janet is quickly becoming – if not there already – the Diana Ross of her day". From The Charlotte Observer, Langston Wertz Jr., while giving a positive review, wrote that Jackson "proves she's a star" with the album. Elysa Gardner from Vibe magazine wrote that the compilation traces "a young woman's progression from questioning others' authority to reveling in her own."

Spin's Chris Norris said: "Since Janet is state-of-the-art production right down to her sculpted nose, it makes sense that she should call her retrospective Design." Chuck Campbell of The Knoxville News-Sentinel described it as "hardly comprehensive" as it lacked almost all the singles from Janet, but noted that the remaining songs "sound tremendous: a testimony to the timelessness of Jackson and her ace production team, Jimmy Jam and Terry Lewis." Erika N. Duckworth from the St. Petersburg Times commented, "Despite enduring cracks about Jackson's less than power-packed voice, Jackson has defied her critics with sheer staying power. Design of a Decade will likely keep her fans hanging around for her next in-carnation." Stephen Thomas Erlewine of AllMusic gave it a four and-a-half out of five star rating, writing, "The hits from those two albums were state-of-the-art dance-pop productions at the time of their release, filled with bottomless beats and memorable, catchy hooks." He also pointed out that the album's new songs felt like "genuine hits, not tacked-on filler, and help make the album a compulsively listenable greatest-hits collection", despite calling its title "misleading". David Browne of Entertainment Weekly was impressed by how "Jackson reinvented both pop and herself during those 10 years", complimenting its "fairly seamless" sequence, although criticizing the album's title as its "biggest flaw". He also noted how the new songs showed "how much more confident a singer Jackson has become, even if the latter number finds her still working overtime to show us she's an honest-to-God grown-up."

== Commercial performance ==
In Jackson's home country, Design of a Decade: 1986–1996 debuted at number four on the Billboard 200 for the week of October 28, 1995, with 129,000 copies sold. The next week, it eventually peaked at number three. It became the first time a Jackson's album did not peak at number one since Control (1986). Design of a Decade: 1986–1996 also spent a total of 16 weeks on the Catalog Albums chart, with a peak of number three in 2001. On December 18, 1995, the collection was certified double platinum by the Recording Industry Association of America (RIAA), denoting shipments of over 2,000,000 copies across the country. As of September 2009, it has sold over 2,422,000 million copies in the United States, as estimated by to Nielsen SoundScan. (Note: The aforementioned sales figures are combined by Nielsen SoundScan, which does not count albums sold through clubs as does BMG Music Service.) Meanwhile, BMG Music Service calculated that the compilation has sold an additional 1,480,000 units through BMG Music Clubs as of February 2003.

In Canada, Design of a Decade: 1986–1996 reached number five on the RPM albums chart. It earned a platinum certification from the Music Canada (MC) for shipments of 100,000 copies across the region. In Australia, the album debuted at number two on the albums chart on October 8, 1995, remaining on the position for three weeks. It was eventually certified four-time platinum by the Australian Recording Industry Association (ARIA), denoting shipments of 280,000 across the country. Design of a Decade: 1986–1996 topped the charts in New Zealand, receiving a platinum certification by Recorded Music NZ (RMNZ). In Japan, the collection charted for nine weeks on the Oricon Albums Chart, with a peak of number four. The Recording Industry Association of Japan (RIAJ) certified it platinum for shipment of 200,000 copies. The record topped the charts in Singapore for the week ending November 10, 1995.

In the United Kingdom, Design of a Decade: 1986–1996 debuted at number two on the UK Albums Chart on October 14, 1995, behind (What's the Story) Morning Glory? by Oasis. It went on to spend 22 weeks inside the chart and received a double platinum certification by the British Phonographic Industry (BPI). The collection remains Jackson's best selling album in the country, with 529,000 copies sold as of May 2019. In Germany, the album reached number ten on the chart and was certified gold by the Bundesverband Musikindustrie (BVMI), with 250,000 copies shipped. In other European regions, Design of a Decade: 1986–1996 peaked inside the top ten in several countries, such as Denmark, France, Ireland, and Switzerland, while peaking at number eight on the pancontinental European Top 100 Albums chart. In 1995, the International Federation of the Phonographic Industry awarded the album a platinum certification, denoting sales of a million copies across the continent. Within four months of release, Design of a Decade: 1986–1996 had sold over 4.3 million copies worldwide.

== Singles ==
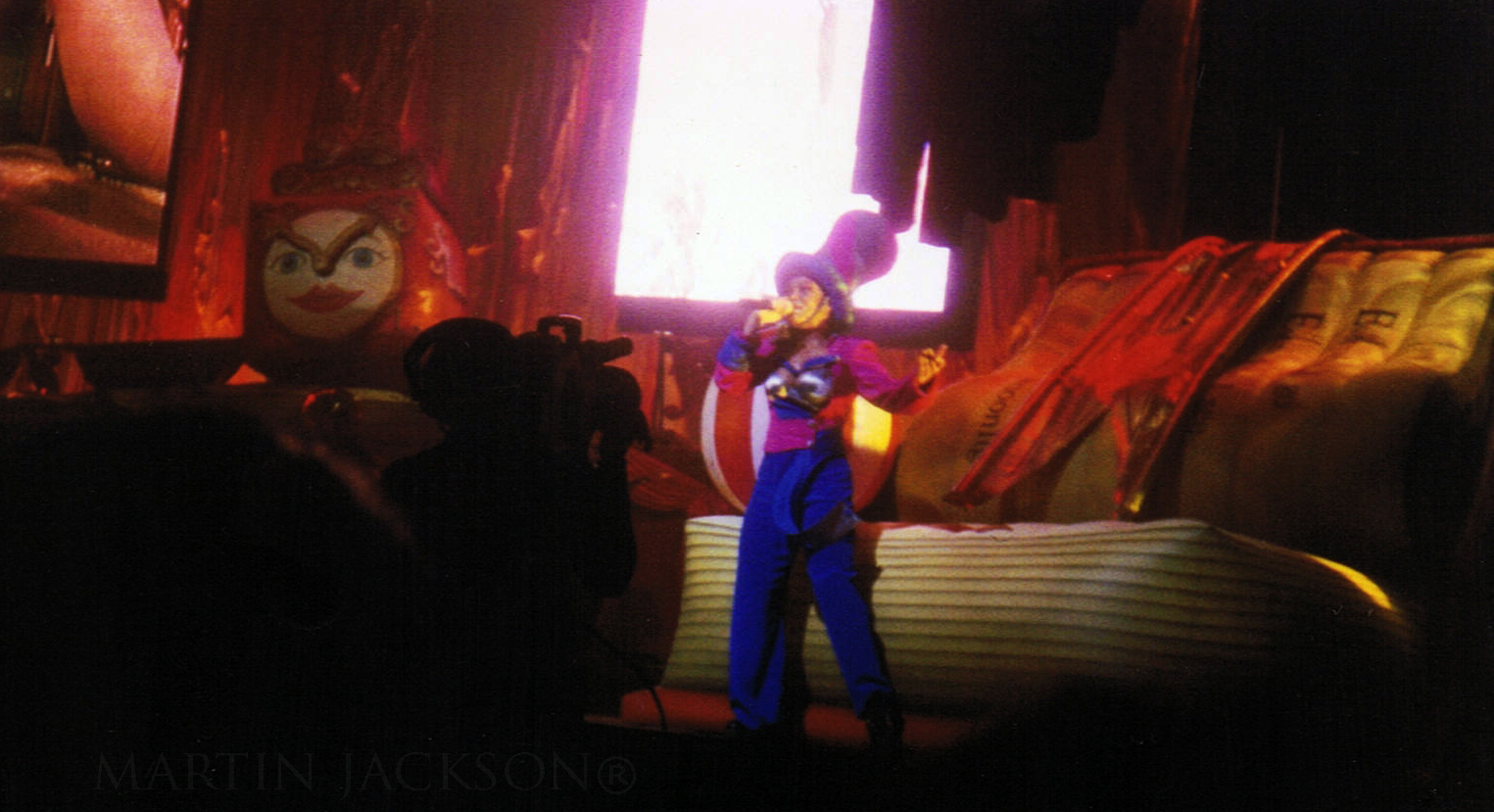
Jackson performing lead single "Runaway" on 1998—99's the Velvet Rope Tour.

"Runaway" was released as the lead single from Design of a Decade: 1986–1996 in August 1995. In the United States, the song entered at number six on the Billboard Hot 100 chart, becoming the fourth highest debut of all time on the chart, tied with the Beatles' "Let It Be" (1970). It also made Jackson the first female artist in history to debut at the top 10 of the chart twice, along with "Scream" months prior. "Runaway" reached number three weeks later and spent 24 weeks inside the Hot 100. Its commercial success was extended to other regions, reaching the top ten in several countries worldwide.

"The Best Things in Life Are Free" was re-released in the United Kingdom in December 1995, serving as the second single from the project in the region. "Twenty Foreplay" was released as the third overall single, and second from the compilation in most territories, in March 1996. In contrast to "Runaway", the song was less successful commercially, reaching the top 30 in countries such as Australia, Canada and the United Kingdom. As it was not released commercially in the United States, "Twenty Foreplay" did not enter the Hot 100, but it reached number 36 on the Mainstream Top 40 chart, based on airplay.

== Track listing ==
All tracks are written by Janet Jackson, James Harris III, Terry Lewis, except where noted.

Design of a Decade: 1986–1996 – North American edition
No.	Title	Writer(s)	Original album	Length
1.	"Runaway"			3:35
2.	"What Have You Done for Me Lately" (LP version w/o intro)		Control (1986)	4:44
3.	"Nasty"		Control	4:04
4.	"When I Think of You"		Control	3:56
5.	"Escapade"		Janet Jackson's Rhythm Nation 1814 (1989)	4:45
6.	"Miss You Much"	Harris; Lewis	Janet Jackson's Rhythm Nation 1814	4:13
7.	"Love Will Never Do (Without You)" (single version)	Harris; Lewis	Janet Jackson's Rhythm Nation 1814	4:35
8.	"Alright" (Shep Pettibone Remix)		Janet Jackson's Rhythm Nation 1814	4:39
9.	"Control" (LP version w/o intro)		Control	5:16
10.	"The Pleasure Principle" (LP edit)	Monte Moir	Control	4:14
11.	"Black Cat" (video mix/long solo)	Janet Jackson	Janet Jackson's Rhythm Nation 1814	4:48
12.	"Rhythm Nation" (LP version w/ intro)		Janet Jackson's Rhythm Nation 1814	5:59
13.	"That's the Way Love Goes"		Janet (1993)	4:27
14.	"Come Back to Me" (I'm Beggin' You Mix)		Janet Jackson's Rhythm Nation 1814	5:38
15.	"Let's Wait Awhile"	Janet Jackson; Harris; Lewis; Melanie Andrews	Control	4:37
16.	"Twenty Foreplay"			6:07
Total length:				75:28

Design of a Decade: 1986–1996 – International edition
No.	Title	Writer(s)	Original album	Length
1.	"Runaway"			3:35
2.	"What Have You Done for Me Lately" (LP edit)		Control	3:32
3.	"Nasty" (LP edit)		Control	3:45
4.	"When I Think of You"		Control	3:56
5.	"Escapade"		Janet Jackson's Rhythm Nation 1814	4:45
6.	"Miss You Much" (LP edit)	Harris; Lewis	Janet Jackson's Rhythm Nation 1814	3:52
7.	"Whoops Now" (LP edit)	Janet Jackson	Janet	4:08
8.	"Love Will Never Do (Without You)" (single version)	Harris; Lewis	Janet Jackson's Rhythm Nation 1814	4:35
9.	"Alright" (Shep Pettibone Remix)		Janet Jackson's Rhythm Nation 1814	4:39
10.	"The Best Things in Life Are Free" (CJ's 7-inch Mix; with Luther Vandross)	Harris; Lewis; Michael Bivins; Ronnie DeVoe	Mo' Money soundtrack (1992)	4:07
11.	"Control" (LP edit)		Control	3:29
12.	"The Pleasure Principle" (LP edit)	Monte Moir	Control	4:14
13.	"Black Cat" (video mix/short solo)	Janet Jackson	Janet Jackson's Rhythm Nation 1814	4:30
14.	"Rhythm Nation" (LP edit)		Janet Jackson's Rhythm Nation 1814	4:28
15.	"That's the Way Love Goes"		Janet	4:27
16.	"Come Back to Me" (I'm Beggin' You Mix)		Janet Jackson's Rhythm Nation 1814	5:38
17.	"Let's Wait Awhile"	Janet Jackson; Harris; Lewis; Melanie Andrews	Control	4:37
18.	"Twenty Foreplay" (edit)			5:20
Total length:				77:29

Design of a Decade: 1986–1996 – Limited edition (bonus disc)
No.	Title	Writer(s)	Original album	Length
1.	"Young Love" (12-inch dance mix)	René Moore; Angela Winbush	Janet Jackson (1982)	5:09
2.	"Diamonds" (Cool Summer Mix Edit; with Herb Alpert and Lisa Keith)	Harris; Lewis	Keep Your Eye on Me (1987)	4:02
3.	"The Knowledge" (Q Sound Mix)	Harris; Lewis	Janet Jackson's Rhythm Nation 1814	4:01
4.	"Say You Do"	Moore; Winbush	Janet Jackson	6:49
5.	"Don't Stand Another Chance"	Marlon Jackson; John Barnes	Dream Street (1984)	4:17
6.	"French Blue"	Jesse Johnson	"Fast Girls" single (1984)	6:23
7.	"When I Think of You" (Jazzy Mix)		Control	10:19
Total length:				44:58

Design of a Decade: 1986–1996 – video compilation
No.	Title	Director(s)	Length
1.	"What Have You Done for Me Lately"	Piers Ashworth; Brian Jones
2.	"Nasty"	Mary Lambert
3.	"When I Think of You"	Julien Temple
4.	"Control"	Lambert
5.	"Let's Wait Awhile"	Dominic Sena
6.	"The Pleasure Principle"	Sena
7.	"Miss You Much"	Sena
8.	"Rhythm Nation"	Sena
9.	"Escapade"	Peter Smillie
10.	"Alright"	Temple
11.	"Come Back to Me"	Sena
12.	"Black Cat"	Wayne Isham
13.	"Love Will Never Do (Without You)"	Herb Ritts
14.	"That's the Way Love Goes"	René Elizondo Jr.
15.	"Whoops Now"	Yuri Elizondo
16.	"Runaway"	Marcus Nispel
17.	"Runaway Documentary"

== Credits and personnel ==
Credits and personnel adapted from the album's liner notes.

- Melanie Andrews – arranger
- Jerome Benton – vocals
- Lee Blaske – arranger
- Patrick Demarchelier – photography
- Alan Friedman – programming
- Larimie Garcia – design
- Greg Gorman – photography
- Jeri Heiden – art direction, design
- Steve Hodge – engineer, mixing
- Goh Hotoda – remixing
- Janet Jackson – arranger, executive producer, main performer, producer, rhythm, vocals, background vocals
- Jimmy Jam – arranger, assistant engineer, multiple instruments, producer, rhythm, vocals
- Jellybean Johnson – producer, remix consultant, vocals
- Terry Lewis – multiple instruments, producer
- Bob Ludwig – mastering
- John McClain – executive producer
- Monte Moir – arranger, assistant engineer, producer
- Shep Pettibone – post-production, remixing
- Herb Ritts – photography
- David Ritz – liner notes
- Mike Scott – guitar
- Tony Viramontes – photography
- Michael Wagener – remixing
- Bruce Weber – photography
- Steve Wiese – assistant engineer, engineer, producer
- Eddie Wolfl – photography

== Charts ==
=== Weekly charts ===
Weekly chart peaks of Design of a Decade: 1986–1996
Charts	Peak position
Australian Albums (ARIA)	2
Austrian Albums (Ö3 Austria)	15
Belgian Albums (Ultratop Flanders)	7
Belgian Albums (Ultratop Wallonia)	6
Canada Top Albums/CDs (RPM)	5
Canadian Albums (The Record)	5
Danish Albums (Hitlisten)	6
Dutch Albums (Album Top 100)	8
European Albums (Top 100)	8
French Albums (SNEP)	2
Finnish Albums (Suomen virallinen lista)	18
German Albums (Offizielle Top 100)	10
Irish Albums (IFPI)	2
Italian Albums (FIMI)	27
Japanese Albums (Oricon)	4
New Zealand Albums (RMNZ)	1
Norwegian Albums (VG-lista)	18
Scottish Albums (Official Charts)	4
Singapore Albums (SPVA)	1
Swedish Albums (Sverigetopplistan)	14
Swiss Albums (Schweizer Hitparade)	6
UK Albums (Official Charts)	2
UK R&B Albums (Official Charts)	1
US Billboard 200	3
US Top R&B/Hip-Hop Albums (Billboard)	4

=== Year-end charts ===
Year-end chart positions of Design of a Decade: 1986–1996
Year	Chart	Position
1995	Australian Albums (ARIA)	6
1995	Belgian Albums (Ultratop Flanders)	71
1995	Canadian Albums (RPM)	59
1995	Dutch Albums (Album Top 100)	77
1995	European Albums (Music & Media)	69
1995	French Albums (SNEP)	50
1995	German Albums (Offizielle Top 100)	92
1995	Japanese Albums (Oricon)	90
1995	New Zealand Albums (Recorded Music NZ)	33
1995	UK Albums (OCC)	21
1995	US Billboard 200	143
1996	Australian Albums (ARIA)	53
1996	Canadian Albums (RPM)	86
1996	UK Albums (OCC)	125
1996	US Billboard 200	55
1996	US Top R&B/Hip-Hop Albums (Billboard)	88

== Certifications and sales ==
Certifications and sales for Design of a Decade: 1986–1996
Region	Certification	Certified units/sales
Australia (ARIA)	4× Platinum	280,000^{^}
Belgium (BRMA)	Gold	25,000^{*}
Canada (Music Canada)	Platinum	100,000^{^}
Germany (BVMI)	Gold	250,000^{^}
Japan (RIAJ)	Platinum	200,000^{^}
Netherlands (NVPI)	Gold	50,000^{^}
New Zealand (RMNZ)	Platinum	15,000^{^}
Switzerland (IFPI Switzerland)	Gold	25,000^{^}
United Kingdom (BPI)	2× Platinum	600,000^{^}
United States (RIAA)	2× Platinum	2,422,000
Summaries
Europe (IFPI)	Platinum	1,000,000^{*}
^{*} Sales figures based on certification alone.^{^} Shipments figures based on certification alone.

Certifications for Design of a Decade: 1986–1996 (video)
Region	Certification	Certified units/sales
United States (RIAA)	Gold	50,000^{^}
^{^} Shipments figures based on certification alone.
