= Say You Do =

Say You Do may refer to:

- "Say You Do" (Dierks Bentley song)
- "Say You Do" (Janet Jackson song)
- "Say You Do" (Sigala song)
- "Say You Do" (Ultra song)
