= List of awards and nominations received by Janet Jackson =

Janet Jackson awards and nominations
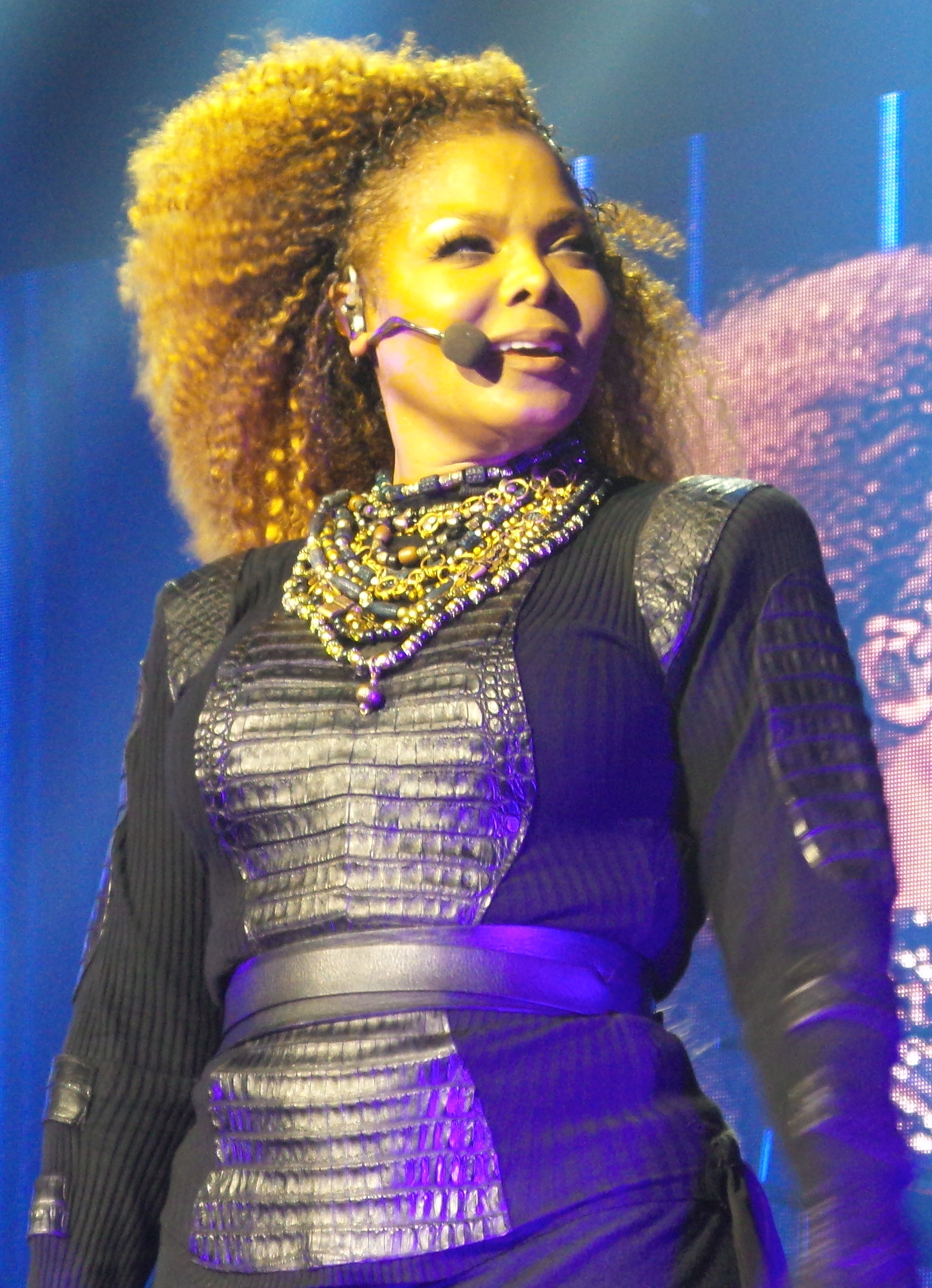
- Jackson performing in Honolulu, Hawaii during the Unbreakable Tour, 2015
Awards and nominations
Award	Wins	Nominations
American Music Awards	13	34
Billboard Music Awards	11	20
BRIT Awards	0	4
Golden Globe Awards	0	1
Grammy Awards	5	21
MTV Video Music Awards	5	39
MTV Europe Awards	2	4
Soul Train Music Awards	11	22

Totals (Note: Certain award groups do not simply award one winner. They acknowledge several different recipients, have runners-up, and have third place. Since this is a specific recognition and is different from losing an award, runner-up mentions are considered wins in this award tally. For simplification and to avoid errors, each award in this list has been presumed to have had a prior nomination.)
- Wins: 231
- Nominations: 469

Janet Jackson is an American singer, songwriter and actress who has received many accolades in a career that has spanned over fifty years. Jackson received her first nominations from a major award ceremony in 1987 when she received two Grammy Award nominations, including the Grammy for Album of the Year for her album, Control. Three years later, in 1990, Jackson became the first woman to be nominated for the Grammy Award for Producer of the Year, Non-Classical for the album, Janet Jackson's Rhythm Nation 1814. That same year, she won her first Grammy for Best Music Video for the concept short film Rhythm Nation 1814. Jackson would go on to win five competitive Grammy Awards between 1990 and 2002 and remains the only artist to be nominated in the pop, R&B, rock, rap and dance categories. In 2026, Jackson was inducted into its Grammy Hall of Fame after her 1989 recording, Janet Jackson's Rhythm Nation 1814, was picked for inclusion in that year's class.

Jackson has also received accolades for writing music, including the Academy Award nomination for Best Original Song for the 1993 ballad, "Again", from the film, Poetic Justice. In addition, Jackson is the recipient of thirteen American Music Awards, eleven Billboard Music Awards, eleven Soul Train Music Awards and five MTV Video Music Awards, including the MTV Video Vanguard Award in 1990.

Jackson has received several honors and inductions, including the American Music Award of Merit, MTV Icon Award, the Billboard Icon Award, the World Music Awards Legend Award, the National Recording Registry (for the album, Janet Jackson's Rhythm Nation 1814 album), the Grammy Hall of Fame and the Rock and Roll Hall of Fame. In addition, she's won several awards and nominations for her film and philanthropic work, receiving the APLA's Commitment to Life Award, amfAR's Award of Courage and GLAAD's Vanguard Award for the lattermost work.

== Awards and nominations ==
Award/organization (Note: Charts are not included, unless they are explicitly described as "awards" or specific trophies are given.)	Year	Nominee/work	Category	Result	Ref.
Academy Awards	1994	"Again"	Best Original Song	Nominated	
A&M Records	1990	Janet Jackson	Quintuple International Platinum Award	Won	
American Black Achievement Awards	1988	Control	Music Award	Won	
American Black Achievement Awards	1991	Rhythm Nation 1814	Music Award	Won	
American Black Achievement Awards	1993	janet.	Music Award	Nominated	
American Choreography Awards	2000	Janet: The Velvet Rope	Best Television/Variety Special	Nominated	
American Cinema Awards	1988	Janet Jackson	Performer of the Year (Video/Recording Field)	Won	
American Music Awards	1987	Janet Jackson	Favorite Pop/Rock Female Artist	Nominated	
American Music Awards	1987	Janet Jackson	Favorite Soul/R&B Female Artist	Nominated	
American Music Awards	1987	Janet Jackson	Favorite Pop/Rock Female Video Artist	Nominated	
American Music Awards	1987	Janet Jackson	Favorite Soul/R&B Female Video Artist	Won	
American Music Awards	1987	Control	Favorite Pop/Rock Album	Nominated	
American Music Awards	1987	Control	Favorite Soul/R&B Album	Nominated	
American Music Awards	1987	"Nasty"	Favorite Soul/R&B Single	Won	
American Music Awards	1987	"When I Think of You"	Favorite Pop/Rock Video	Nominated	
American Music Awards	1987	"When I Think of You"	Favorite Soul/R&B Video	Nominated	
American Music Awards	1988	Janet Jackson	Favorite Pop/Rock Female Artist	Nominated	
American Music Awards	1988	Janet Jackson	Favorite Soul/R&B Female Artist	Nominated	
American Music Awards	1988	"When I Think of You"	Favorite Pop/Rock/Soul/R&B Video	Won	
American Music Awards	1990	Janet Jackson	Favorite Dance Artist	Nominated	
American Music Awards	1990	"Miss You Much"	Favorite Soul/R&B Single	Won	
American Music Awards	1990	"Miss You Much"	Favorite Dance Single	Won	
American Music Awards	1991	Janet Jackson	Favorite Pop/Rock Female Artist	Won	
American Music Awards	1991	Janet Jackson	Favorite Soul/R&B Female Artist	Won	
American Music Awards	1991	Janet Jackson	Favorite Dance Artist	Won	
American Music Awards	1991	Rhythm Nation 1814	Favorite Pop/Rock Album	Nominated	
American Music Awards	1991	Rhythm Nation 1814	Favorite Soul/R&B Album	Nominated	
American Music Awards	1994	Janet Jackson	Favorite Pop/Rock Female Artist	Nominated	
American Music Awards	1994	Janet Jackson	Favorite Soul/R&B Female Artist	Nominated	
American Music Awards	1994	janet.	Favorite Pop/Rock Album	Nominated	
American Music Awards	1994	janet.	Favorite Soul/R&B Album	Nominated	
American Music Awards	1994	"That's The Way Love Goes"	Favorite Soul/R&B Single	Nominated	
American Music Awards	1995	Janet Jackson	Favorite Pop/Rock Female Artist	Nominated	
American Music Awards	1995	Janet Jackson	Favorite Soul/R&B Female Artist	Nominated	
American Music Awards	1999	Janet Jackson	Favorite Soul/R&B Female Artist	Won	
American Music Awards	2002	Janet Jackson	Favorite Pop/Rock Female Artist	Won	
American Music Awards	2002	Janet Jackson	Internet Artist of the Year	Nominated	
American Music Awards	2002	All for You	Favorite R&B/Soul Album	Nominated	
American Music Awards	2004	Janet Jackson	Favorite Soul/R&B Female Artist	Nominated	
American Music Awards	2016	Janet Jackson	Favorite Soul/R&B Female Artist	Nominated	
AMOA Jukebox Awards	1986	"What Have You Done For Me Lately"	Soul Record of the Year	Won	
AMOA Jukebox Awards	1987	"Control"	Soul Record of the Year	Won	
AMOA Jukebox Awards	1990	"Escapade"	R&B Record of the Year	Nominated	
AMOA Jukebox Awards	1990	Rhythm Nation 1814	Pop CD of the Year	Nominated	
AMOA Jukebox Awards	1990	Rhythm Nation 1814	R&B CD of the Year	Nominated	
AOL Television Awards	2001	All for You Tour	Best Concert	Won	
BET Awards	2001	Janet Jackson	Best Female Artist	Nominated	
BET Awards	2001	"All for You"	Video of the Year	Nominated	
BET Awards	2004	Janet Jackson	Best Female Artist	Nominated	
BET J Virtual Awards	2008	Janet Jackson	Female Artist of the Year	Nominated	
Billboard Number One Awards	1983	Janet Jackson	Top Black Albums Artists - Female	Won	
Billboard Number One Awards	1986	Janet Jackson	Top Pop Singles Artist	Won	
Billboard Number One Awards	1986	Janet Jackson	Top Pop Singles Artist - Female	Won	
Billboard Number One Awards	1986	Janet Jackson	Top Dance Club Play Artist	Won	
Billboard Number One Awards	1986	Janet Jackson	Top Dance Sales Artist	Won	
Billboard Number One Awards	1986	Janet Jackson	Top Black Artist	Won	
Billboard Number One Awards	1986	Janet Jackson	Top Black Singles Artist	Won	
Billboard Number One Awards	1987	Janet Jackson	Top Black Singles Artist - Female	Won	
Billboard Music Awards	1990	Janet Jackson	Top Pop Artist of the Year	Nominated	
Billboard Music Awards	1990	Janet Jackson	Top Hot 100 Singles Artist of the Year	Won	
Billboard Music Awards	1990	Janet Jackson	Top Dance Artist	Won	
Billboard Music Awards	1990	Janet Jackson	Top Dance Club Play Artist of the Year	Nominated	
Billboard Music Awards	1990	Janet Jackson	Top Hot Dance Singles Artist of the Year	Won	
Billboard Music Awards	1990	Janet Jackson	Top Selling R&B Albums Artist of the Year	Won	
Billboard Music Awards	1990	Janet Jackson	Top R&B Artist of the Year	Won	
Billboard Music Awards	1990	Janet Jackson	Top R&B Singles Artist of the Year	Won	
Billboard Music Awards	1990	Rhythm Nation 1814	Best Pop Album	Won	
Billboard Music Awards	1990	Rhythm Nation 1814	Best R&B Album	Won	
Billboard Music Awards	1998	Janet Jackson	Top Hot 100 Singles Artist, Female	Nominated	
Billboard Music Awards	1998	Janet Jackson	Top Dance/Club Artist of the Year	Nominated	
Billboard Music Awards	1998	Janet Jackson	Top R&B Female Artist of the Year	Nominated	
Billboard Music Awards	1998	"I Get Lonely"	Top Hot R&B Airplay Single	Nominated	
Billboard Music Awards	2001	"All for You"	Top Hot 100 Single of the Year	Nominated	
Billboard Music Awards	2001	Janet Jackson	Top Female R&B/Hip-Hop Artist of the Year	Nominated	
Billboard Music Awards	2020	Janet Jackson	Top R&B Tour	Nominated	
Billboard/Tanqueray Sterling Music Video Awards	1990	Janet Jackson	Best Female Artist (Black/Rap)	Won	
Billboard/Tanqueray Sterling Music Video Awards	1990	Janet Jackson	Best Female Artist (Dance)	Won	
Billboard/Tanqueray Sterling Music Video Awards	1990	"Rhythm Nation"	Director's Award (Black/Rap)	Won	
Billboard/Tanqueray Sterling Music Video Awards	1990	"Alright"	Director's Award (Dance)	Won	
Billboard/Tanqueray Sterling Music Video Awards	1990	"Rhythm Nation"	Billboard/Tanqueray Sterling Music Video Award for Artistic Achievement	Won	
Billboard/Tanqueray Sterling Music Video Awards	1991	"Love Will Never Do (Without You)"	Best Female Artist (Pop/Rock)	Nominated	
Billboard/Tanqueray Sterling Music Video Awards	1991	"Love Will Never Do (Without You)"	Best Director (Pop/Rock)	Nominated	
Billboard/Tanqueray Sterling Music Video Awards	1994	"If"	Dance Clip of The Year	Won	
Billboard/Tanqueray Sterling Music Video Awards	1995	"Scream"	Best Pop/Rock Clip of The Year	Won	
Black Gold Awards	1984	Janet Jackson	Hottest Female Newcomer	Won	
Black Gold Awards	1987	"When I Think of You"	Outstanding Music Video	Won	
Black Reel Awards	2001	"Doesn't Really Matter"	Best Song	Nominated	
Black Reel Awards	2011	For Colored Girls	Outstanding Supporting Actress	Nominated	
Black Reel Awards	2011	For Colored Girls	Outstanding Ensemble	Won	
Black Reel Awards	2022	JANET JACKSON.	Outstanding Documentary	Nominated	
Black Girls Rock!	2018	Janet Jackson	Rock Star Award	Won	
Blockbuster Entertainment Awards	1995	Janet Jackson	Favorite Female Artist	Won	
Blockbuster Entertainment Awards	1996	Janet Jackson	Favorite Pop Female	Won	
Blockbuster Entertainment Awards	1998	Janet Jackson	Favorite R&B Female	Won	
Blockbuster Entertainment Awards	1999	Janet Jackson	Favorite Female Artist	Won	
Blockbuster Entertainment Awards	2001	The Nutty Professor II: The Klumps	Favorite Actress – Comedy	Nominated	
Blockbuster Entertainment Awards	2001	"Doesn't Really Matter"	Favorite Song from a Movie	Nominated	
BMI Pop Awards	1988	"Let's Wait Awhile"	Most Played Songs	Won	
BMI Pop Awards	1990	"Alright"	Most Played Songs	Won	
BMI Pop Awards	1990	"Escapade"	Most Played Songs	Won	
BMI Pop Awards	1990	"Rhythm Nation"	Most Played Songs	Won	
BMI Pop Awards	1991	"Black Cat"	Most Played Songs	Won	
BMI Pop Awards	1991	"Come Back to Me"	Most Played Songs	Won	
BMI Pop Awards	1992	"State of the World"	Most Played Songs	Won	
BMI Pop Awards	1993	"That's the Way Love Goes"	Most Played Songs	Won	
BMI Pop Awards	1994	"Again"	Most Played Songs	Won	
BMI Pop Awards	1994	"Any Time, Any Place"	Most Played Songs	Won	
BMI Pop Awards	1994	"If"	Most Played Songs	Won	
BMI Pop Awards	1994	"Because of Love"	Most Played Songs	Won	
BMI Pop Awards	1994	"You Want This"	Most Played Songs	Won	
BMI Pop Awards	1995	"Scream"	Most Played Songs	Won	
BMI Pop Awards	1995	"Runaway"	Most Played Songs	Won	
BMI Pop Awards	1999	"Together Again"	Most Played Songs	Won	
BMI Pop Awards	1999	"I Get Lonely"	Most Played Songs	Won	
BMI Pop Awards	2002	"All for You"	Most Played Songs	Won	
BMI Pop Awards	2002	"Doesn't Really Matter"	Most Played Songs	Won	
BMI Pop Awards	2002	"Someone to Call My Lover"	Most Played Songs	Won	
BMI Pop Awards	2004	"All Nite (Don't Stop)"	Most Played Songs	Won	
BMI Pop Awards	2008	"Bust It Baby Pt. 2"	Most Played Songs	Won	
BMI Pop Awards	2013	"Poetic Justice"	Most Played Songs	Won	
BMI R&B/Hip-Hop Awards	2001	"Doesn't Really Matter"	Most Performed Songs	Won	
BMI R&B/Hip-Hop Awards	2002	"All for You"	Song of the Year	Won	
BMI Film & Television Awards	2001	"Doesn't Really Matter"	Most Performed Song from a Film	Won	
Bravo Otto Awards	1990	Janet Jackson	Female Singer	Bronze	
Bravo Otto Awards	1993	Janet Jackson	Female Singer	Gold	
Bravo Otto Awards	1994	Janet Jackson	Female Singer	Silver	
Bravo Otto Awards	1995	Janet Jackson	Female Singer	Gold	
Bravo Otto Awards	1997	Janet Jackson	Female Singer	Bronze	
Brit Awards	1990	"Miss You Much"	Best Music Video	Nominated	
Brit Awards	1991	Janet Jackson	Best International Female Artist	Nominated	
Brit Awards	1994	Janet Jackson	Best International Female Artist	Nominated	
Brit Awards	1998	Janet Jackson	Best International Female Artist	Nominated	
British LGBT Awards	2020	Janet Jackson	Celebrity Ally	Nominated	
CableACE Awards	1995	Janet: World Tour Special	Best Variety Special or Series	Nominated	
Capital Gold Awards	2003	Janet Jackson	New Legend Award	Nominated	
Cash Box Year-End Awards	1986	Janet Jackson	Top Black/Contemporary Female Artist: Pop Singles	Won	
Cash Box Year-End Awards	1986	Janet Jackson	Top Female Artist: Black/Contemporary Albums	Won	
Cash Box Year-End Awards	1986	Janet Jackson	Top Female Artist: Black/Contemporary Singles	Won	
Cash Box Year-End Awards	1986	Janet Jackson	Top Female Vocalist: Music Video	Won	
Cash Box Year-End Awards	1986	Janet Jackson	Top Female Vocalist: 12-inch Singles	Won	
Cash Box Year-End Awards	1986	Control	Top Black/Contemporary Album	Won	
Cash Box Year-End Awards	1986	"Nasty"	Top Black/Contemporary Single	Won	
Cash Box Year-End Awards	1986	"When I Think Of You"	Top Music Video	Won	
Cash Box Year-End Awards	1989	"Miss You Much"	Top Black/Contemporary Single	Won	
Cash Box Year-End Awards	1990	Janet Jackson	Top Female Artist: Pop Singles	Won	
Cash Box Year-End Awards	1990	Janet Jackson	Top Black/Contemporary Female Artist: Pop Singles	Won	
Cash Box Year-End Awards	1990	Janet Jackson	Top Adult Contemporary Female Artist: Pop Singles	Won	
Cash Box Year-End Awards	1990	Janet Jackson	Top Female Artist: Black/Contemporary Albums	Won	
Cash Box Year-End Awards	1990	Janet Jackson	Top Female Artist: Black/Contemporary Singles	Won	
Cash Box Year-End Awards	1993	Janet Jackson	Top Female Artist: Pop Albums	Won	
Cash Box Year-End Awards	1994	Janet Jackson	Top Female Artist: Urban Singles	Won	
Cash Box Year-End Awards	1994	"Any Time, Any Place"	Top Urban Single	Won	
Channel V Awards (Australia)	1998	Janet Jackson	Best International Female Artist	Won	
Clio Awards	1996	"Scream	Best Music Video	Won	
Dance Gallery Awards	1987	Janet Jackson	Special Honors Award	Won	
Dance Music Awards	1990	Janet Jackson	Best Dance Artist	Nominated	
Diamond Awards Festival (Belgium)	1989	"Miss You Much"	Diamond Award	Won	
DMC World DJ Championships	1987	Janet Jackson	Best Female Vocalist	Won	
Echo Prize	1996	Janet Jackson	Best International Rock/Pop Female Artist	Nominated	
Echo Prize	1999	The Velvet Rope	Best International Rock/Pop Female Artist	Nominated	
Edison Awards	1987	Control	Album of the Year	Won	
Essence Awards	2002	Janet Jackson	Reader's Choice for Entertainer of the Year Award	Won	
FHM	2003	Janet Jackson	World's Sexiest Woman	Nominated	
FHM	2004	Janet Jackson	World's Sexiest Woman	Nominated	
FHM	2005	Janet Jackson	World's Sexiest Woman	Nominated	
GAFFA Awards	1997	Janet Jackson	Best Foreign Female Act	Nominated	
GLAAD Media Awards	1998	The Velvet Rope	Outstanding Music	Won	
Golden Globe Awards	1993	"Again"	Best Original Song – Motion Picture	Nominated	
Grammy Awards	1987	Control	Album of the Year	Nominated	
Grammy Awards	1987	Control	Best R&B Vocal Performance, Female	Nominated	
Grammy Awards	1987	"What Have You Done For Me Lately"	Best Rhythm and Blues Song	Nominated	
Grammy Awards	1988	Control—The Videos, Part II	Concept Music Video	Nominated	
Grammy Awards	1990	Janet Jackson	Producer of the Year, Non-Classical	Nominated	
Grammy Awards	1990	Rhythm Nation 1814	Best Instrumental Arrangement Accompanying Vocalist	Nominated	
Grammy Awards	1990	Rhythm Nation 1814	Best Music Video, Long Form	Won	
Grammy Awards	1990	"Miss You Much"	Best R&B Vocal Performance, Female	Nominated	
Grammy Awards	1991	"Alright"	Best R&B Vocal Performance, Female	Nominated	
Grammy Awards	1991	"Alright"	Best Rhythm and Blues Song	Nominated	
Grammy Awards	1991	"Black Cat"	Best Rock Vocal Performance, Female	Nominated	
Grammy Awards	1993	"The Best Things In Life Are Free"	Best R&B Performance by a Duo or Group with Vocal	Nominated	
Grammy Awards	1994	"That's the Way Love Goes"	Best R&B Vocal Performance, Female	Nominated	
Grammy Awards	1994	"That's the Way Love Goes"	Best Rhythm and Blues Song	Won	
Grammy Awards	1996	HIStory: Past, Present and Future, Book I (as co-producer)	Album of the Year	Nominated	
Grammy Awards	1996	"Scream"	Best Pop Collaboration with Vocals	Nominated	
Grammy Awards	1996	"Scream"	Best Music Video, Short Form	Won	
Grammy Awards	1998	"Got 'til It's Gone"	Best Short Form Music Video	Won	
Grammy Awards	1999	"I Get Lonely"	Best Female R&B Vocal Performance	Nominated	
Grammy Awards	2000	"What's It Gonna Be?!"	Best Rap Performance by a Duo or Group	Nominated	
Grammy Awards	2002	All For You	Best Pop Vocal Album	Nominated	
Grammy Awards	2002	"All For You"	Best Dance Recording	Won	
Grammy Awards	2002	"Someone to Call My Lover"	Best Female Pop Vocal Performance	Nominated	
Grammy Awards	2005	Damita Jo	Best Contemporary R&B Album	Nominated	
Grammy Awards	2005	"I Want You"	Best Female R&B Vocal Performance	Nominated	
Grammy Awards	2007	20 Y.O.	Best Contemporary R&B Album	Nominated	
Hammy Awards	1986	Janet Jackson	Disco Artist of the Year	Won	
Hammy Awards	1986	Janet Jackson	Disco Album Artists of the Year	Won	
Harlem Fashion Row Style Awards	2022	Janet Jackson	Icon of the Year	Won	
Hit Awards (Hong Kong)	1993	Janet Jackson	Top Female Artist	Nominated	
Hit Awards (Norway)	1998	Janet Jackson	International Female Artist of the Year	Won	
Hit Awards (Norway)	2001	"All for You"	Hit of the Year	Nominated	
Hit Awards (Norway)	2001	Janet Jackson	International Female Artist of the Year	Nominated	
HX Awards	2008	"Feedback"	Best Song of the Year	Nominated	
International Dance Music Awards	1994	"That's the Way Love Goes"	Best R&B 12"	Won	
International Dance Music Awards	1994	"If"	Best Dance Video	Won	
International Dance Music Awards	1995	Janet Jackson	Outstanding Achievement in Dance Music	Won	
International Dance Music Awards	2000	"Doesn't Really Matter"	Best Dance Video	Won	
International Dance Music Awards	2002	"All for You"	Best Dance Video	Won	
International Dance Music Awards	2005	Janet Jackson	Best Dance Artist, Solo	Nominated	
International Dance Music Awards	2005	"All Nite (Don't Stop)"	Best Dance Video	Nominated	
International Dance Music Awards	2009	"Feedback"	Best Pop/Dance Track	Nominated	
International Dance Music Awards	2009	"Feedback"	Best House/Garage Track	Nominated	
International Dance Music Awards	2009	"Feedback"	Best Urban Dance Track	Nominated	
International Dance Music Awards	2010	"Make Me"	Best Urban Dance Track	Nominated	
Japan Gold Disc Awards	2001	"Doesn't Really Matter"	Top Selling Song of the Year – Foreign Music	Won	
Japan Gold Disc Awards	2002	All for You	Top Selling International Pop Album of the Year	Won	
Japan Radio Popular Disks Awards	2001	"All for You"	Record of the Year	Won	
Japan Radio Popular Disks Awards	2001	Janet Jackson	Best Female Vocalist	Won	
Lady of Soul Awards	1995	"You Want This"	Best Music Video of the Year	Nominated	
Lady of Soul Awards	1995	"Any Time, Any Place"/"And On and On"	Best Song of the Year	Nominated	
Lady of Soul Awards	1998	"I Get Lonely"	Best R&B Single, Solo	Nominated	
Lady of Soul Awards	1998	"I Get Lonely"	Best R&B Music Video	Nominated	
Lady of Soul Awards	1998	The Velvet Rope	Best R&B Album of the Year	Nominated	
Lady of Soul Awards	2001	"All for You"	Best R&B Single, Solo	Nominated	
MOBO Awards	2006	Janet Jackson	Best International Female Artist	Nominated	
MTV Europe Music Awards	1995	Janet Jackson	Best Female	Nominated	
MTV Europe Music Awards	1997	Janet Jackson	Best Female	Won	
MTV Europe Music Awards	1998	Janet Jackson	Best Female	Nominated	
MTV Europe Music Awards	2000	Janet Jackson	Best Female	Nominated	
MTV Europe Music Awards	2000	Janet Jackson	Best R&B	Nominated	
MTV Europe Music Awards	2001	Janet Jackson	Best Female	Nominated	
MTV Europe Music Awards	2001	Janet Jackson	Best R&B	Nominated	
MTV Japan Video Music Awards	2002	"All for You"	Best Video of the Year	Nominated	
MTV Japan Video Music Awards	2002	"All for You"	Best Female Video	Nominated	
MTV Movie Awards	1994	Poetic Justice	Best Female Performance	Won	
MTV Movie Awards	1994	Janet Jackson	Most Desirable Female	Won	
MTV Movie Awards	2022	JANET JACKSON.	Best Music Documentary	Nominated	
MTV Video Music Awards	1987	"Nasty"	Best Female Video	Nominated	
MTV Video Music Awards	1987	"Nasty"	Best Overall Performance in a Video	Nominated	
MTV Video Music Awards	1987	"Nasty"	Best Choreography in a Video (Awarded to Paula Abdul)	Won	
MTV Video Music Awards	1987	"When I Think of You"	Best Choreography in a Video (Credited to Paula Abdul and Michael Kidd)	Nominated	
MTV Video Music Awards	1988	"The Pleasure Principle"	Best Female Video	Nominated	
MTV Video Music Awards	1988	"The Pleasure Principle"	Best Choreography in a Video (Awarded to Barry Lather)	Won	
MTV Video Music Awards	1990	"Rhythm Nation"	Best Choreography in a Video (Shared with Anthony Thomas)	Won	
MTV Video Music Awards	1990	"Rhythm Nation"	Best Dance Video	Nominated	
MTV Video Music Awards	1991	"Love Will Never Do (Without You)"	Best Female Video	Won	
MTV Video Music Awards	1991	"Love Will Never Do (Without You)"	Best Choreography in a Video (Shared with Tina Landon and Herb Ritts)	Nominated	
MTV Video Music Awards	1991	"Love Will Never Do (Without You)"	Best Art Direction in a Video (Credited to Pierluca De Carlo)	Nominated	
MTV Video Music Awards	1993	"That's the Way Love Goes"	Best Female Video	Nominated	
MTV Video Music Awards	1993	"That's the Way Love Goes"	Best Choreography in a Video (Credited to Tina Landon)	Nominated	
MTV Video Music Awards	1993	"That's the Way Love Goes"	Best Dance Video	Nominated	
MTV Video Music Awards	1994	"If"	Best Female Video	Won	
MTV Video Music Awards	1994	"If"	Best Choreography in a Video (Credited to Tina Landon)	Nominated	
MTV Video Music Awards	1994	"If"	Best Dance Video	Nominated	
MTV Video Music Awards	1995	"Scream"	Video of the Year	Nominated	
MTV Video Music Awards	1995	"Scream"	Best Dance Video	Won	
MTV Video Music Awards	1995	"Scream"	Best Choreography in a Video (Awarded to Tina Landon, LaVelle Smith Jr., Travis Payne and Sean Cheesman)	Won	
MTV Video Music Awards	1995	"Scream"	Best Art Direction in a Video (Awarded to Tom Foden)	Won	
MTV Video Music Awards	1995	"Scream"	Viewer's Choice	Nominated	
MTV Video Music Awards	1995	"Scream"	Best R&B Video	Nominated	
MTV Video Music Awards	1995	"Scream"	Breakthrough Video	Nominated	
MTV Video Music Awards	1995	"Scream"	Best Direction in a Video (Credited to Mark Romanek)	Nominated	
MTV Video Music Awards	1995	"Scream"	Best Special Effects in a Video (Credited to Kevin Tod Haug, Alexander Frisch, Ashley Clemens, Richard 'Dr.' Baily, Jay Johnson and P. Scott Makela)	Nominated	
MTV Video Music Awards	1995	"Scream"	Best Editing in a Video (Credited to Robert Duffy)	Nominated	
MTV Video Music Awards	1995	"Scream"	Best Cinematography in a Video (Credited to Harris Savides)	Nominated	
MTV Video Music Awards	1996	"Runaway"	Best Choreography in a Video (Credited to Tina Landon)	Nominated	
MTV Video Music Awards	1998	"Together Again"	Best Dance Video	Nominated	
MTV Video Music Awards	1999	"What's It Gonna Be?"	Best Hip-Hop Video	Nominated	
MTV Video Music Awards	1999	"What's It Gonna Be?"	Best Direction in a Video (Credited to Hype Williams and Busta Rhymes)	Nominated	
MTV Video Music Awards	1999	"What's It Gonna Be?"	Best Art Direction in a Video (Credited to Regan Jackson)	Nominated	
MTV Video Music Awards	1999	"What's It Gonna Be?"	Best Special Effects in a Video (Credited to Fred Raimondi)	Nominated	
MTV Video Music Awards	2001	"All for You"	Video of the Year	Nominated	
MTV Video Music Awards	2001	"All for You"	Best Female Video	Nominated	
MTV Video Music Awards	2001	"All for You"	Best Dance Video	Nominated	
MTV Video Music Awards	2001	"All for You"	Best Choreography in a Video (Credited to Shawnette Heard, Marty Kudelka and Roger Lee)	Nominated	
Music & Media	1986	Janet Jackson	Female Artist Of The Year - Singles	Won	
Music Week	1986	Control	Top Dance and Disco Album	Won	
MuchMusic Video Awards	1995	"Scream"	Best International Video	Nominated	
MuchMusic Video Awards	1999	"What's It Gonna Be?!"	Best International Video	Nominated	
MVPA Awards	1994	"If"	Best Choreography (Awarded to Tina Landon)	Won	
MVPA Awards	1998	"Got 'Til It's Gone"	Video of the Year	Nominated	
MVPA Awards	1998	"Got 'Til It's Gone"	Pop Video of the Year	Nominated	
MVPA Awards	1998	"Got 'Til It's Gone"	Best Art Direction	Nominated	
MVPA Awards	2001	"Doesn't Really Matter"	Soundtrack Video of the Year	Nominated	
MVPA Awards	2001	"Doesn't Really Matter"	Best Special Effects In A Music Video	Nominated	
MVPA Awards	2002	"All For You"	Best Choreography	Nominated	
MVPA Awards	2002	"Someone To Call My Lover"	Best R&B Video	Nominated	
MVPA Awards	2002	"Someone To Call My Lover"	Best Hair	Nominated	
MVPA Awards	2002	"Son of a Gun (I Betcha Think This Song Is About You)"	Best Cinematography	Nominated	
MVPA Awards	2002	"Son of a Gun (I Betcha Think This Song Is About You)"	Best Make-Up	Won	
MVPA Awards	2005	"All Nite (Don't Stop)"	Director of the Year	Won	
NAACP Image Awards	1986	Janet Jackson	Outstanding Female Artist	Nominated	
NAACP Image Awards	1990	Janet Jackson	Greater Hartford - Musical and Civil Rights Efforts Award	Honoree	
NAACP Image Awards	1992	Janet Jackson	Chairman's Award	Honoree	
NAACP Image Awards	1994	Janet Jackson	Outstanding Female Artist	Nominated	
NAACP Image Awards	1994	Poetic Justice	Outstanding Lead Actress in a Motion Picture	Nominated	
NAACP Image Awards	1996	"Runaway"	Outstanding Music Video	Nominated	
NAACP Image Awards	1996	"Scream"	Outstanding Music Video	Nominated	
NAACP Image Awards	1999	Janet: The Velvet Rope	Outstanding Variety Series/Special	Nominated	
NAACP Image Awards	1999	Janet: The Velvet Rope	Outstanding Performance in a Variety Series/Special	Nominated	
NAACP Image Awards	2000	"Doesn't Really Matter"	Outstanding Music Video	Nominated	
NAACP Image Awards	2002	Janet Jackson	Outstanding Female Artist	Nominated	
NAACP Image Awards	2002	"All for You"	Outstanding Music Video	Nominated	
NAACP Image Awards	2005	Janet Jackson	Outstanding Female Artist	Nominated	
NAACP Image Awards	2008	Why Did I Get Married?	Outstanding Supporting Actress in a Motion Picture	Won	
NAACP Image Awards	2011	Why Did I Get Married Too?	Outstanding Actress in a Motion Picture	Nominated	
NAACP Image Awards	2016	Janet Jackson	Outstanding Female Artist	Nominated	
NAACP Image Awards	2016	"No Sleeep"	Outstanding Duo or Group	Nominated	
NAACP Image Awards	2016	"No Sleeep"	Outstanding Music Video	Nominated	
NAACP Image Awards	2016	"No Sleeep"	Outstanding Song	Nominated	
NAACP Image Awards	2016	"Unbreakable"	Outstanding Song	Nominated	
NAACP Image Awards	2016	Unbreakable	Outstanding Album	Nominated	
NAACP Image Awards	2019	Janet Jackson	Outstanding Female Artist	Nominated	
Nancy Susan Reynolds Award	1990	"Let's Wait Awhile"	Outstanding Portrayals of Sexual Issues - Music Videos	Won	
NARM Awards	1987	Control	Best-Selling Album	Nominated	
NARM Awards	1987	Control	Best-Selling Album, Female	Nominated	
NARM Awards	1987	Control	Best-Selling Black Album, Female	Nominated	
NARM Awards	1990	Rhythm Nation 1814	Best-Selling Black Album, Female	Won	
NARM Awards	1991	Rhythm Nation 1814	Best-Selling Album, Female	Won	
NARM Awards	1991	Rhythm Nation 1814	Best-Selling Black Album, Female	Won	
NARM Awards	1994	janet.	Best-Selling Recording of the Year	Won	
NARM Awards	1994	janet.	Best-Selling Pop Recording	Won	
NARM Awards	1994	janet.	Best-Selling R&B Recording	Won	
National Association of Black Owned Broadcasters Awards	2002	Janet Jackson	Entertainer of the Year	Won	
Nickelodeon Kids' Choice Awards	1990	Janet Jackson	Favorite Female Musician/Group	Nominated	
Nickelodeon Kids' Choice Awards	1991	Janet Jackson	Favorite Female Musician/Group	Nominated	
Nickelodeon Kids' Choice Awards	1994	Janet Jackson	Favorite Singer	Nominated	
Nickelodeon Kids' Choice Awards	1994	"Again"	Favorite Song	Nominated	
Nickelodeon Kids' Choice Awards	1995	Janet Jackson	Favorite Singer	Won	
Nickelodeon Kids' Choice Awards	2001	The Nutty Professor II: The Klumps	Favorite Movie Actress	Nominated	
Nickelodeon Kids' Choice Awards	2002	Janet Jackson	"Wannabe" Role Model Award	Won	
Nickelodeon Kids' Choice Awards	2002	Janet Jackson	Favorite Female Singer	Nominated	
Nielsen BDS Awards	2002	"All for You"	300,000 Spins Award	Won	
Nielsen BDS Awards	2002	"Someone to Call My Lover"	200,000 Spins Award	Won	
Nielsen BDS Awards	2004	"Luv Me, Luv Me"	200,000 Spins Award	Won	
Nielsen BDS Awards	2006	"Call on Me (feat. Nelly)"	50,000 Spins Award	Won	
NRJ Awards	2001	"Doesn't Really Matter"	Best Song from a Movie	Nominated	
Pandora Radio	2018	Janet Jackson	Billionaire Award	Won	
People's Choice Awards	1990	Janet Jackson	Favorite Female Musical Performer	Nominated	
People's Choice Awards	2001	The Nutty Professor II: The Klumps	Favorite Comedy Motion Picture	Nominated	
People's Choice Awards	2016	Janet Jackson	Favorite R&B Artist	Nominated	
People	2001	"All for You"	Best Song	Won	
Perfect 10 (Singapore)	1993	Janet Jackson	Best Pop Female	Won	
Pollstar Awards	1990	Rhythm Nation World Tour	Most Creative Stage Production	Nominated	
Pollstar Awards	1998	The Velvet Rope Tour	Most Creative Stage Production	Nominated	
Pollstar Awards	2001	All for You Tour	Most Creative Stage Production	Nominated	
Pollstar Awards	2025	Janet Jackson: Together Again	R&B Tour of the Year	Nominated	
Silver Horn Film & TV Awards	2022	JANET JACKSON.	Best Documentary (Film or TV)	Won	
Soul Train Music Awards	1987	Control	Album of the Year, Female	Won	
Soul Train Music Awards	1987	"What Have You Done for Me Lately"	Music Video of the Year	Won	
Soul Train Music Awards	1988	"The Pleasure Principle"	Best Single, Female	Nominated	
Soul Train Music Awards	1988	"Control"	Music Video of the Year	Won	
Soul Train Music Awards	1990	Rhythm Nation 1814	Album of the Year, Female	Won	
Soul Train Music Awards	1990	"Miss You Much"	Single of the Year, Female	Won	
Soul Train Music Awards	1990	"Rhythm Nation"	Music Video of the Year	Won	
Soul Train Music Awards	1991	"Alright"	Music Video of the Year	Won	
Soul Train Music Awards	1991	"Alright"	Best Single, Female	Nominated	
Soul Train Music Awards	1992	Janet Jackson	Sammy Davis, Jr. Entertainer of the Year Award	Honoree	
Soul Train Music Awards	1994	"If"	Music Video of the Year	Won	
Soul Train Music Awards	1994	janet.	Album of the Year, Female	Nominated	
Soul Train Music Awards	1994	"That's the Way Love Goes"	Single of the Year, Female	Nominated	
Soul Train Music Awards	1994	"That's the Way Love Goes"	Song of the Year	Nominated	
Soul Train Music Awards	1995	"Any Time, Any Place"	Best Single, Female	Nominated	
Soul Train Music Awards	1998	The Velvet Rope	Album of the Year, Female	Nominated	
Soul Train Music Awards	2000	"What's It Gonna Be?!"	Music Video of the Year	Won	
Soul Train Music Awards	2015	Janet Jackson	Best R&B/Soul Female Artist	Nominated	
Soul Train Music Awards	2018	"Made for Now"	Best Dance Performance	Nominated	
The Source Music Awards	1999	"What's It Gonna Be?!"	Music Video of the Year	Won	
The Source Music Awards	2004	Janet Jackson	Female Artist of the Year	Nominated	
Surround Music Awards	2003	Janet: Live in Hawaii	Best Concert Video	Nominated	
TEC Awards	2002	All for You Tour	Outstanding Creative Achievement, Tour Production	Nominated	
Teen Choice Awards	2001	Janet Jackson	Choice Female Artist	Nominated	
Teen Choice Awards	2001	"All for You"	Choice Single	Nominated	
Teen Choice Awards	2001	All for You	Choice Album	Nominated	
Teen Choice Awards	2002	Janet Jackson	Choice Female Artist	Nominated	
Telly Awards	2005	"History: Pass it On" Campaign	Silver Telly Award in Education category	Won	
TMF Awards (Netherlands)	1998	Janet Jackson	Best International Female Singer	Won	
TMF Awards (Netherlands)	1999	Janet Jackson	Best International Female Singer	Won	
TMF Awards (Netherlands)	2001	Janet Jackson	Best International Female Singer	Nominated	
TV Land Awards	2006	Cast of Good Times	Impact Award	Won	
TVZ Video Awards	1995	"Scream"	International Video of the Year	Won	
Urban Teen Music Awards	1987	"Nasty"	Best Club Single	Won	
Urban Teen Music Awards	1987	Janet Jackson	Best Female Club Vocal	Won	
VHI Big in '04 Awards	2004	Janet Jackson	Big Banned Award	Nominated	
VH1/Vogue Fashion Awards	1998	"Got 'til It's Gone"	Most Stylish Music Video	Won	
VH1/Vogue Fashion Awards	2000	"Doesn't Really Matter"	Most Stylish Music Video	Won	
VH1/Vogue Fashion Awards	2000	Janet Jackson	Most Fashionable Female Artist	Nominated	
VH1 Video Music Awards	1998	"I Get Lonely"	Sexiest Music Video of the Year	Nominated	
VH1 My Music Awards	2000	Janet Jackson	Double Threat (Musician-Actors)	Nominated	
VH1 My Music Awards	2000	Janet Jackson	Woman of the Year	Nominated	
VH1 My Music Awards	2001	Janet Jackson	My Favorite Female	Nominated	
VH1 My Music Awards	2001	Janet Jackson	Hottest Live Show: All for You Tour	Nominated	
World Music Video Awards	1987	Janet Jackson	World's Top Music Video	Nominated	
ZAZ Awards	2001	Janet Jackson	Artist of the Year	Nominated	
ZAZ Awards	2001	Janet Jackson	Female of the Year	Nominated	
ZAZ Awards	2001	All for You	Album of the Year	Nominated	
ZAZ Awards	2001	"All for You"	Song of the Year	Nominated	
ZAZ Awards	2001	"All for You"	Video of the Year	Nominated	

== Other accolades ==
=== Induction honors ===
Organization	Year	Honor	Work	Result	Ref
Grammy Hall of Fame	2026	Grammy Hall of Fame	Rhythm Nation 1814	Inducted	
Hollywood Walk of Fame	1990	Hollywood Walk of Fame Star	—N/a	Inducted	
MOBO Awards	2004	MOBO Icon Hall of Fame	—N/a	Inducted	
National Recording Registry	2020	National Recording Registry	Rhythm Nation 1814	Inducted	
Nickelodeon Kids' Choice Awards	1996	Kids' Choice Hall of Fame	—N/a	Inducted	
Rock and Roll Hall of Fame	2019	Rock and Roll Hall of Fame	—N/a	Inducted	

=== Lifetime honors ===
Name of the honor, year the honor was awarded, category and type of honor
Honor	Year (Note: Indicates the year of ceremony. Each year is linked to the article about the awards held that year, wherever possible.)	Category	Type	Ref.
American Music Awards	2001	Award of Merit	Honoree	
American Music Awards	2025	Icon Award	Honoree	
BET Awards	2015	Ultimate Icon: Music Dance Visual Award	Honoree	
Billboard Music Awards	1995	Artist Achievement Award	Honoree	
Billboard Music Awards	2001	Artistic Achievement Award	Honoree	
Billboard Music Awards	2018	Icon Award	Honoree	
BMI R&B/Hip-Hop Award	2018	Icon Award	Honoree	
Lady of Soul Awards	1997	Lena Horne Award for Outstanding Career Achievement	Honoree	
Los Angeles Chapter of the Recording Academy	2002	Governor's Award	Honoree	
Mnet Asian Music Awards	2018	Inspiration Award	Honoree	
MTV Europe Music Awards	2018	Global Icon Award	Honoree	
MTV Icon	2001	Icon Award	Honoree	
MTV Japan Video Music Awards	2002	Inspiration Award	Honoree	
MTV Video Music Awards	1990	Video Vanguard Award	Honoree	
NewNowNext Awards	2008	Always Next, Forever Now Award	Honoree	
Out	2017	Music Icon Award	Honoree	
Radio Disney Music Awards	2018	Impact Award	Honoree	
Radio Music Awards	2004	Legend Award	Honoree	
Soul Train Music Awards	2004	Quincy Jones Award for Outstanding Career Achievements	Honoree	
The Carnival: Choreographer's Ball	2019	Lifetime Achievement Award	Honoree	
TMF Awards	2001	Lifetime Achievement Award	Honoree	
World Music Awards	1999	Legend Award	Honoree	

=== Philanthropy honors ===
Name of the honor, year the honor was awarded, category and type of honor
Honor	Year	Category	Type	Ref.
A Place Called Home	2003	Angel of the Year	Honoree	
AIDS Project Los Angeles	1999	Commitment to Life	Honoree	
AmfAR Cinema Against AIDS	2013	Award of Courage	Honoree	
Behind the Bench Awards	2004	Touching a Life Award	Honoree	
C.O.R.E.	1995	Dr. Martin Luther King Jr. Award for Outstanding Achievement	Honoree	
Essence	1995	Humanitarian Award	Honoree	
GLAAD Media Awards	2008	Vanguard Award	Honoree	
Greater Harlem Chamber of Commerce	2018	Proclamation Award	Honoree	
Human Rights Campaign	2005	Humanitarian Award	Honoree	
Lisa Lopes Foundation	2008	Humanitarian of the Year	Honoree	
One Hundred Black Men Awards	2004	One Hundred Black Men Award	Honoree	
Spelman College Sisters Award	1997	Outstanding Humanitarian Effort	Honoree	
Starlight Foundation	1991	Humanitarian of the Year	Honoree	

=== Guinness World Records ===
Janet Jackson claimed seven entries in the Guinness World Records, maintaining six of the records.

Key
†	Indicates a former world-record holder

Year the record was awarded, title of the record, and the record holder
Year	Record	Record holder	Ref.
1991	† Largest Recording Contract	Janet Jackson (Note: In March 1991, Jackson signed a deal with Virgin Records for $32 million.)	
1996	Most Expensive Short Film	"Scream"	
1999	Top-Selling Dance Album of the Decade (Female)	Janet.	
1999	Most Successful US Dance Single	"That's the Way Love Goes"	
1999	Most Successful Siblings in Music History	Janet and Michael Jackson	
2001	Most Expensive Special Effects in a Music Video	"What's It Gonna Be?!"	
2007	Largest Fine Ever Imposed on Broadcaster	Super Bowl 2004 halftime show incident	
