= Come Give Your Love to Me =

Single by Janet Jackson

from the album Janet Jackson
- B-side: "The Magic Is Working" (UK); "Forever Yours" (US)
- Released: January 28, 1983 (UK)
- Recorded: 1982
- Studio: Studio Masters (Los Angeles, California); Wally Heider (Los Angeles); Larrabee Sound (Los Angeles)
- Genre: Rock; new wave
- Length: 5:03 (album version); 3:57 (radio edit)
- Label: A&M
- Songwriters: Glen Barbee; Charmaine Sylvers
- Producers: Foster Sylvers; Jerry Weaver

Janet Jackson singles chronology
| "Young Love" (1982) | "Come Give Your Love to Me" (1983) | "Say You Do" (1983) |

"Come Give Your Love to Me" is a song by the American recording artist Janet Jackson, released in 1983 as the second single from her debut solo album, Janet Jackson (1982). "Come Give Your Love to Me" was written by Glen Barbee and Charmaine Sylvers, and produced by Foster Sylvers and Jerry Weaver.

In the United States, "Come Give Your Love to Me" reached number 58 on the pop chart, number 17 on the R&B chart, and number 30 on the dance chart. Following Jackson's breakthrough in 1986 with her third album, Control, "Come Give Your Love to Me" was included as a B-side on the 1986 single "When I Think of You".

== Critical reception ==
Billboard magazine called "Come Give Your Love to Me" a "lean rock number in the electronic new-music style, sparsely arranged."

== Track listing and formats ==
- US 7" vinyl single

A: "Come Give Your Love to Me" – 3:57
B: "Forever Yours" – 4:58

- UK 12" vinyl single

A: "Come Give Your Love to Me" (Single version) – 5:03
B: "The Magic Is Working" – 4:08

- Australia 7" vinyl single

A: "Come Give Your Love to Me" (Edited version) – 4:00
B: "Forever Yours" – 4:58

== Credits and personnel ==
- Foster Sylvers – synthesizer, bass, drums, arranger, producer, backing vocals
- Patricia Sylvers – synthesizer, backing vocals
- Earnest "Pepper" Reed – guitar
- Dana Meyers – backing vocals
- Howard Hewett – backing vocals
- Charmaine Sylvers – songwriter
- Glen Barbee – songwriter
- Jerry Weaver – producer
- Humberto Gatica – mixing
- Bob Brown – engineer
- Wally Traugott – mastering

== Charts ==
Weekly chart performance for "Come Give Your Love to Me"
| Chart (1983) | Peak position |
|---|---|
| US Billboard Hot 100 | 58 |
| US Hot R&B/Hip-Hop Songs (Billboard) | 17 |
| US Dance Club Songs (Billboard) | 30 |
| US Cash Box Top 100 | 73 |
