= Twenty Foreplay =

1996 single by Janet Jackson

Single by Janet Jackson

from the album Design of a Decade: 1986–1996
- Released: December 5, 1995
- Recorded: July–August 1995
- Studio: Flyte Tyme (Edina, Minnesota)
- Genre: R&B; Quiet Storm
- Length: 4:50 (US version); 4:26 (international version); 6:06 (album version)
- Label: A&M
- Songwriters: Janet Jackson; James Harris III; Terry Lewis
- Producers: Janet Jackson; Jimmy Jam and Terry Lewis

Janet Jackson singles chronology
"Runaway" (1995)	"Twenty Foreplay" (1995)	"Got 'til It's Gone" (1997)

Music video
- "Twenty Foreplay" on YouTube

"Twenty Foreplay" is a song by American singer-songwriter Janet Jackson from her first greatest hits album, Design of a Decade: 1986–1996 (1995). Written and produced by Jackson and Jimmy Jam and Terry Lewis as one of the two new songs on the album, it was sent to radio stations in the United States as the second single on December 5, 1995, while being issued as the third single on March 25, 1996, in the United Kingdom, by A&M Records. The song is a play on the word "foreplay" and "24 hours a day", and has an unusual musical structure, containing "over-the-top" lyrics that find Jackson singing to a boyfriend.

"Twenty Foreplay" received positive reviews from music critics, yet was unable to enter the Billboard Hot 100 or the Hot R&B/Hip-Hop Songs charts in the US due to the lack of a commercial release. Overseas, it achieved moderate success commercially, reaching the top 40 in Australia, Canada, Israel and the UK. The song's black-and-white music video was directed by Keir McFarlane, and features Jackson visually inspired by actress Dorothy Dandridge, living the glamorous Hollywood life. Once, the song was performed on the State of the World Tour in 2017.

== Background and composition ==
In 1991, Jackson fulfilled her contract with A&M Records, signing a multimillion-dollar contract with Virgin Records estimated between $32 million and $50 million, making her the highest paid recording artist at the time. Her fifth studio album, titled Janet, was released in May 1993, selling 14 million copies worldwide. As Jackson's contract with Virgin included a clause giving her the option to leave the label during this time, she returned to A&M in order to release Design of a Decade: 1986–1996, her first compilation album. According to A&M president Al Cafaro, no new songs would be released, but "Runaway" and "Twenty Foreplay" were included as new tracks, being both recorded in July and August 1995 with Jackson's longtime collaborators Jimmy Jam and Terry Lewis. The former was released as the lead single from the project, reaching number three on the US Billboard Hot 100. "Twenty Foreplay" was sent to radio stations in the United States as the second single on December 5, 1995, and was commercially released in the United Kingdom as the third single from the compilation on March 25, 1996, by A&M Records.

"Twenty Foreplay" was written and produced by Jackson alongside Jam and Lewis. It was recorded at Flyte Tyme Studios in Edina, Minnesota, by Steve Hodge, who also mixed the track. Instrumentation on the song includes guitar by Mike Scott, drums by Stokley, violins by Caroline Daws, Brenda Mickens, Helen Foli, Dick Massman, Laurie Hippen, Julia Persitz, Andrea Een, and Liz Sobieski, viola by Alice Preves and Hasan Sumen, cello by Josh Koestenbaum and Laura Sewell, bass by Greg Hippen, flute by Ken Holmen, and strings arranged and conducted by Lee Blaske. Jam and Lewis play all other instruments present on the song. "Twenty Foreplay" was mastered by Bob Ludwig at Gateway Mastering in Portland, Maine, along with all other tracks present on Design of a Decade: 1986–1996.

Musically, "Twenty Foreplay" has an unusual structure, as it does not contain a hook. It is an R&B song that starts as a "tender" ballad before changing to a mid-tempo "bump and grind". Danyel Smith of Vibe noted that the song's "suggestive funk interlude" keeps with the spirit of Janet (1993). The title is a play on the word "foreplay" and "24 hours a day", and contains "over-the-top" lyrics, which finds Jackson singing directed to her boyfriend: "Tell me do you want the blindfold / Tell me what you like". On the liner notes of Design of a Decade: 1986–1996, biographer David Ritz wrote that the track "infuses the melody with a lethal combination of carnal heat and emotional sensitivity". The singer told VH1 that "Twenty Foreplay" was a "kind of a sweet and sour thought" for her when she thinks about what the song is about, and she hears "the sadness in it and remember the sadness". The US version of "Twenty Foreplay" is lengthier than the international version, which was edited in order to fit two more songs on the international release of Design of a Decade: 1986–1996.

== Critical reception ==
"Twenty Foreplay" was met with positive reviews from music critics. Elysa Gardner from Vibe saw the track as a "lush romantic ballad"; similarly, the staff of Music Week described it as a "pleasant, slinky ballad", while the staff of Music & Media stated that despite the "infectious beat", the song "comes across as quite mellow due to its lingering vocals and wandering melodies". Gil L. Robertson IV from Cashbox named it Pick of the Week, noting that the song "aptly showcase[s] Jackson's continued evolution as a strong and highly-focused adult performer". On the liner notes of Design of a Decade: 1986-1996, David Ritz called "Twenty Foreplay" a "smoldering ballad, one of those Janet Jackson lovemaking rhapsodies that seem to stop the hands of time". AllMusic senior editor Stephen Thomas Erlewine, while reviewing the album, felt that "Runaway" and "Twenty Foreplay" feel like "genuine hits, not tacked-on filler" on the album. On a contrary note, Billboard's Paul Verna felt that the inclusion of both tracks on the compilation "gives the collection extra sizzle, and suggests that Jackson's already lofty star is still on the rise". Paul Marsh from The San Francisco Examiner wrote that "Runaway" and "Twenty Foreplay" were not "that adventurous, but they're solid", complementing "if they were white of more bohemian, Jackson-Jam-Lewis might have been a hot modern rock band". Gavin Reeve from Smash Hits gave it two out of five, saying, "It's very dreamy, very soothing, and very, erm, sensual." For David Browne of Entertainment Weekly, the track shows "how much more confident a singer Jackson has become", but felt that it finds her "still working overtime to show us she's an honest-to-God grown-up". In a review for the single, the staff of The Guardian stated, "Whoever taught sweet little Janet the art of double entendre must despair at the monster they created."

== Commercial performance ==
Although Billboard's Fred Bronson predicted "Twenty Foreplay" to reach the top 10 on the US Billboard Hot 100 chart, extending Jackson's record as the second female artist with the most consecutive top 10 singles, the song was unable to enter the chart or the Hot R&B/Hip-Hop Songs due to the lack of a commercial release. However, the single managed to enter the US Mainstream Top 40 and R&B/Hip-Hop Airplay charts at numbers 36 and 32, respectively. It achieved similar success in Canada, peaking at number 27 on the RPM singles chart on the week dated May 2, 1996. The single reached number 29 in Australia and spent five weeks on the chart, while peaking at number 38 in New Zealand, charting for a sole week. In the UK, "Twenty Foreplay" debuted at number 22 on the UK Singles Chart for the week ending April 5, 1996, becoming Jackson's first single not to reach the top 20 since "Love Will Never Do (Without You)" (1991). It was present on the chart for six weeks. However, the song fared better on the UK R&B Chart, peaking at number five. The track attained lower success in other countries in Europe, peaking at number 31 in Scotland, number 41 in the Netherlands, and number 74 in Germany.

== Promotion ==
=== Music video ===
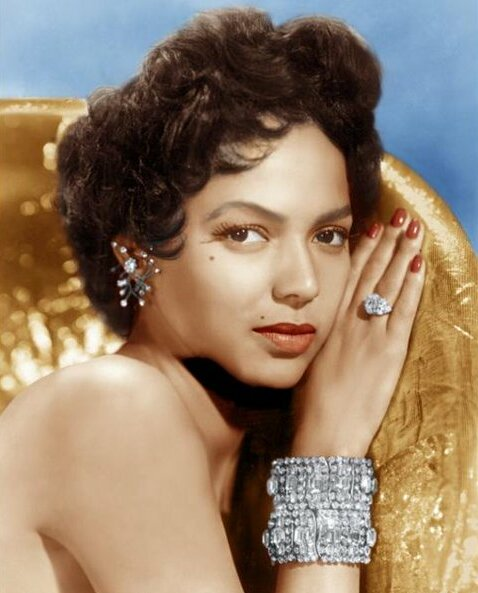
Jackson's visual on the music video was inspired by actress Dorothy Dandridge (pictured)

The music video for "Twenty Foreplay" was directed by Keir McFarlane. Jackson's look on the video was inspired by actress Dorothy Dandridge, who she idolized and had expressed interest in portraying on a biographic film; MTV News considered the video a virtual audition for the role. The video was shot in black-and-white and features the singer as a film actress living the glamorous Hollywood life, such as attending a movie premiere and a press conference, intercut with footage of her singing on the backlot of a movie set. Jim Farber of the New York Daily News pointed out that Jackson had never "gone for the high-toned glamour she apes here", and felt she "glows like Marilyn Monroe at her leggy peak", writing that "her efforts to be seen as timeless couldn't be more transparent. But the clip's haute fashion sense and cool photography impress." On a contrary note, the staff of The Guardian wrote, "Avoid seeing the video; it'll never be as good as the one in your head." The video was released commercially on the two-CD + DVD compilation Japanese Singles Collection -Greatest Hits- (2022).

=== Live performances ===
Jackson sang "Twenty Foreplay" live for the first time on her 2017 State of the World Tour. Accompanied by two back-up singers, the singer performed the song dressed in a loose denim jacket, sweatpants and a flannel shirt tied around her waist. Andrew Barker from Variety magazine said it showcased "perhaps the boldest of her three costume changes" during the show. Analyzing Jackson's voice during the performance, he deemed it strong, although not "always the most layered of instruments, but it has a softness and a lilting sweetness that she managed to emphasize while still projecting well enough to cut through the clatter". Jackson performs the song as part of her 2024–2025 Janet Jackson: Las Vegas residency setlist.

== Track listings and formats ==
- UK CD single
1. "Twenty Foreplay" (Slow Jam International Edit) – 4:26
2. "The Pleasure Principle" (Legendary Radio Mix) – 4:17
3. "Alright" (CJ Radio) – 3:52
4. "The Pleasure Principle" (Legendary Club Mix) – 8:15
- European CD single
1. "Twenty Foreplay" (Slow Jam International Edit) – 4:26
2. "Runaway" (Jam & Lewis Street Mix Edit) – 3:23
3. "Runaway" (Jam & Lewis Ghetto Mix) – 4:54
4. "Twenty Foreplay" (Slow Jam Video Edit) – 4:50
- Remixes CD single
1. "Twenty Foreplay" (Radio Club Mix Edit) – 3:42
2. "Twenty Foreplay" (Junior's Jungle Club Mix) – 9:56
3. "Twenty Foreplay" (Radio Club Mix) – 5:02
4. "Runaway" (G-Man's Hip Hop Mix) – 4:14

== Credits and personnel ==
Credits are adapted from the Design of a Decade: 1986–1996 liner notes.

- Janet Jackson — vocals, songwriter, producer
- James Harris III — songwriter, producer, instruments
- Terry Lewis — songwriter, producer, instruments
- Mike Scott — guitar
- Stokley — drums
- Caroline Daws — violin
- Brenda Mickens — violin
- Helen Foli — violin
- Dick Massman — violin
- Laurie Hippen — violin
- Julia Persitz — violin
- Andrea Een — violin
- Liz Sobieski — violin
- Alice Preves — viola
- Hasan Sumen — viola
- Josh Koestenbaum – cello
- Laura Sewell – cello
- Greg Hippen – bass
- Ken Holmen – flute
- Lee Blaske – strings
- Steve Hodge — recording, mixing
- Bob Ludwig — mastering

== Charts ==
=== Weekly charts ===
Weekly chart performance for "Twenty Foreplay"
Chart (1996)	Peak position
Australia (ARIA)	29
Canada Top Singles (RPM)	27
Canada CHR (The Record)	27
Europe (European Dance Radio)	8
Germany (GfK)	74
Israel (Israeli Singles Chart)	6
Netherlands (Dutch Top 40 Tipparade)	12
Netherlands (Single Top 100)	41
New Zealand (Recorded Music NZ)	38
Scottish Singles Sales (Official Charts)	31
UK Singles (Official Charts)	22
UK Hip Hop/R&B (Official Charts)	5
UK Airplay (Music Week)	50
US Pop Airplay (Billboard)	36
US R&B/Hip-Hop Airplay (Billboard)	32
US Rhythmic Airplay (Billboard)	29
US CHR/Pop (Radio & Records)	35
US CHR/Rhythmic (Radio & Records)	28
US Urban (Radio & Records)	15
US Urban AC (Radio & Records)	15

== Release history ==
Release dates and formats for "Twenty Foreplay"
Region	Date	Format(s)	Label(s)	Ref.
United States	December 5, 1995	Contemporary hit radio; rhythmic contemporary radio	A&M	
Japan	February 25, 1996	CD single	A&M	
United Kingdom	March 25, 1996	CD single	A&M	
