= Young Love (Janet Jackson song) =

Single by Janet Jackson

from the album Janet Jackson
- B-side: "The Magic Is Working"
- Released: July 7, 1982
- Recorded: 1982
- Studio: Allen Zentz Recorders (Los Angeles, CA); Conway Recording Studios (Hollywood, CA); Media West (Los Angeles, CA); Spindletop; Davlen Studios (West Hollywood, CA)
- Genre: Post-disco; dance; funk
- Length: 4:58
- Label: A&M
- Songwriters: René Moore; Angela Winbush
- Producers: Bobby Watson; René Moore; Angela Winbush

Janet Jackson singles chronology
"Young Love" (1982)	"Come Give Your Love to Me" (1983)

"Young Love" is the debut single by American recording artist Janet Jackson from her self-titled debut album (1982). It was written and produced by René Moore, Angela Winbush, with additional production by Bobby Watson. It was released as on July 7, 1982, by A&M Records. Prior to her rise to fame, the singer had no interest in pursuing a musical career. Despite this, she was motivated to pursue a career in entertainment, and considered the idea after recording herself in the studio. After acting in the variety show The Jacksons, she began starring in several TV series and commenced recording her debut album.

"Young Love" received generally positive reviews from music critics, who highlighted it as a standout song from Janet Jackson and praised its catchiness. It peaked at number 64 on the Billboard Hot 100, and was a success on the R&B chart, additionally peaking at number 16 in New Zealand. In order to promote her album, she performed the song on Soul Train and American Bandstand. In recent years, she has included the song on her 2008 Rock Witchu Tour and her performance at the 2010 Essence Music Festival.

== Background ==
Jackson had initially desired to become a horse racing jockey or entertainment lawyer, with plans to support herself through acting. Despite this, she anticipated pursuing a career in entertainment, and considered the idea after recording herself in the studio. When Jackson was sixteen, she had a contract arranged with A&M Records and began recording her debut album with the assistance of her father, working with a number of songwriters and producers such as René Moore, Angela Winbush, and Bobby Watson, who produced her first single, titled "Young Love", released on July 7, 1982.

== Composition and reception ==
Lou Broadus, music director of WASC Radio, described the song as an "uptempo, happy song with a good hook". After the single "Young Love" was released, it became a hit with young people. Stephen Thomas Erlewine from website AllMusic noted that Jackson demonstrated "no distinctive musical personality of her own, which isn't surprising considering that she was in her teens. [...] Only "Young Love" stands out among the undistinguished, sub-disco thumpers and drippy ballads. In a retrospective review, Peter Piatkowski from PopMatters stated that it was an "insight into the kind of excellent dance music she'd master later on", also describing the track as a "perfect example of post-disco pop joy".

In the United States, "Young Love" received little notoriety on the principal singles chart, the Billboard Hot 100; it was able to reach a peak of number 64. However, on the Hot R&B/Hip-Hop Songs, the single managed to reach number six. As of June 1993, the single had sold 200,000 copies in the region. In New Zealand, "Young Love" debuted at number 46 on its singles chart, on the issue dated March 13, 1983. Several weeks later, on April 17, 1983, the song reached its peak of number 16. It fell off the chart on May 1, at number 33. A year later, it re-entered the singles chart, at number 45.

== Live performances ==
In order to promote Janet Jackson, she performed the song on American TV shows Solid Gold, American Bandstand, and Soul Train in 1982. She also performed the song on a West German television program Musikladen. Several years later, Jackson included the song on her 2008 Rock Witchu Tour in the "Pre-Control Medley" section of the show. It was later added to her performance at the 2010 Essence Music Festival, held in New Orleans, Louisiana, which she headlined. The song was also used during the DJ intermission on the 2017–2019 State of the World Tour. Jackson featured the song on the setlist for her Janet Jackson: Las Vegas show in 2024–2025.

== Official versions ==
- Album Version - 4:58
- Seven Inch Version° - 3:41
- 12" Dance Mix^ - 5:07

°Unavailable on CD

^The 12" Dance Mix was first released in 1995 on the Limited Edition Bonus Disc of Design of a Decade: 1986–1996

== Track listings and formats ==
- US 7" vinyl single

A: "Young Love" – 3:39
B: "The Magic is Working" – 4:08

== Credits and personnel ==
- Janet Jackson - vocals
- René Moore - songwriter, producer
- Angela Winbush - songwriter, producer
- Bobby Watson - producer
- Harry Langdon - protography
- Allen Zentz - mastering

== Charts ==
Chart performance for "Young Love"
Chart (1982/1983)	Peak position
New Zealand (Recorded Music NZ)	16
US Billboard Hot 100	64
US Hot R&B/Hip-Hop Songs (Billboard)	6
US Cash Box Top 100 Singles	76
