= René Moore =

American singer-songwriter and producer

- Also known as: René
- Born: Ivan Rene Moore; August 19, 1959 (age 67)
- Origin: Los Angeles, California
- Genres: R&B, Soul
- Occupations: Singer, songwriter, keyboardist, producer, composer
- Instruments: Vocals, Keyboard
- Years active: 1980–present
- Labels: Hip-O, Mercury, Polydor

René Moore (born Ivan Rene Moore; August 19, 1959) is an American singer-songwriter and producer, and is more memorable musically for hits he produced with his soul co-singer Angela Winbush as part of René & Angela, including "I'll Be Good," "Save Your Love (For #1)," "Your Smile," and "You Don't Have to Cry."

== Biography ==
Moore and singer Angela Winbush first met in 1977 in his hometown of Los Angeles, California and began performing together as Rene & Angela later that year. They released a self-titled debut album on Capitol Records in 1980. They would go on to become a successful writer/producer duo, cultivating hit songs for contemporary artists, including Stephanie Mills and Kurtis Blow. They released their second album Wall to Wall in 1982, followed by Rise (1983), both also on Capitol Records. During this period, they had two moderate R&B hit singles, "I Love You More" and "My First Love".

During Rene & Angela's early years, Moore and Winbush were asked to produce songs for Janet Jackson's 1982 self-titled debut album, Janet Jackson. One of the songs, "Young Love", became Jackson's first top ten R&B hit reaching number six on the chart. They also wrote successfully for Stephanie Mills, (their "I Have Learned to Respect the Power of Love", gave Mills her first-ever No. 1 R&B single, in 1985). Just prior to that, Rene & Angela decided to sign with Mercury Records in 1984.

They released their breakthrough album, A Street Called Desire in early 1985. Among the hit singles included on this album was their first R&B No. 1 with the dance single, "Save Your Love (For #1)", which included guest vocals from rapper Kurtis Blow, making it besides Chaka Khan's "I Feel For You", one of the first songs to prominently feature a guest rapper as a featured performer. Other hit singles included the top 5 hit single "I'll Be Good"; "Your Smile" was another R&B No. 1 hit while the subsequent "You Don't Have to Cry", hit No. 2 in the beginning of 1986, followed by yet another top 5 hit, "No How-No Way". Eventually A Street Called Desire sold over a million copies going Gold, but on the brink of their greatest success, tensions between Moore and Winbush had grown, and they dissolved the partnership.

The two stopped working professionally together in 1986. They pursued successful solo careers amid legal disputes over creative rights to their work together, and others with which they collaborated as composers, songwriters, and producers. In spite of this, both Winbush and Moore enjoyed success in their respective solo careers, with Moore releasing his first solo album in 1988 titled Destination Love. Moore released a second solo album, Street Songz for Rufftown Entertainment Group, Inc. in 2004.

== Discography ==
=== Studio albums ===
- Destination Love (1988)
- Street Songz (2004)

=== Singles ===
- "All or Nothing" (1988) US R&B #15
- "Never Say Goodbye to Love" (1988) US R&B #19
