= Say You Do (Janet Jackson song) =

Single by Janet Jackson

from the album Janet Jackson
- B-side: "You'll Never Find (A Love Like Mine)"
- Released: April 29, 1983
- Recorded: 1982
- Studio: Allen Zentz Recorders (Los Angeles, CA); Conway Recording Studios (Hollywood, CA); Media West (Los Angeles, CA); Spindletop; Davlen Studios (West Hollywood, CA)
- Genre: Post-disco; R&B; funk
- Length: 5:20 (Album version); 3:48 (Single version); 6:50 (Remixed version)
- Label: A&M
- Songwriters: René Moore; Angela Winbush
- Producers: Bobby Watson; René Moore; Angela Winbush

Janet Jackson singles chronology
"Come Give Your Love to Me" (1983)	"Say You Do" (1983)	"Don't Mess Up This Good Thing" (1983)

"Say You Do" was the third single from Janet Jackson's self-titled debut album Janet Jackson (1982). The song was written by René Moore & Angela Winbush.

== Background ==
The original album version (5:20) appears on vinyl and cassette pressings of the album. A remixed version (6:50) was first released on the 12-inch single and was later included on CD pressings replacing the original album version. An edited version (3:48) was released on the 7-inch single and remains unreleased on CD.

== Chart performance ==
It peaked at number fifteen on the R&B chart, and eleven on the dance chart. This was her third top 20 R&B and first top 20 dance single.

== Live performances ==
Other than a few television appearances at the time of its release, Janet would not perform this song live or on tour until 2008. She included it in the "Pre-Control Medley" section of her "Rock Witchu Tour". Jackson also included the song in her performance at the 2010 Essence Music Festival, held in New Orleans, Louisiana. The song is also used during the DJ intermission on the 2017-2019 State of the World Tour.

== Track listing and formats ==
- US 7" vinyl single

A: "Say You Do" (Edited version) – 3:48
B: "You'll Never Find (A Love Like Mine)" – 4:08

- US 12" vinyl single

A: "Say You Do" (Specially Remixed version) – 6:50
B: "You'll Never Find (A Love Like Mine)" – 4:08

- Netherlands 12" vinyl single

A: "Say You Do" (Single version) – 6:34
B: "You'll Never Find (A Love Like Mine)" – 4:08

== Charts ==
Chart positions for "Say You Do"
Chart (1983)	Peak position
US Hot R&B/Hip-Hop Songs (Billboard)	15
US Dance Club Songs (Billboard)	11
