= When I Think of You =

1986 single by Janet Jackson

- Cover art for most 7-inch vinyl releases

Single by Janet Jackson

from the album Control
- B-side: "Pretty Boy"; "Come Give Your Love to Me"
- Released: July 28, 1986
- Recorded: 1985
- Studio: Flyte Tyme, Minneapolis, Minnesota
- Genre: Dance-pop; R&B; synth-funk
- Length: 3:56
- Label: A&M
- Songwriters: James Harris III; Terry Lewis
- Producer: Jimmy Jam and Terry Lewis

Janet Jackson singles chronology
"Nasty" (1986)	"When I Think of You" (1986)	"Control" (1986)

Music video
- "When I Think of You" on YouTube

"When I Think of You" is a song by American singer Janet Jackson from her third studio album, Control (1986). It was released on July 28, 1986, as the album's third single. Composed by songwriters and record producers Jimmy Jam and Terry Lewis, the song is about a person who finds relief and fun in a lover. It was Jackson's first number-one single on the US Billboard Hot 100, and also peaked at number 10 in the United Kingdom.

Pitchfork included the song on their "The 200 Best Songs of the 1980s" list at number 48.

The song was resurrected in 1995 when released on two limited-edition CD single formats in the United Kingdom, one containing remixes by Deep Dish and Heller & Farley, and the other containing remixes by David Morales. That same year these remixes were included on certain releases of "Runaway". "When I Think of You" has been included in each of Jackson's greatest hits albums: Design of a Decade: 1986–1996 (1995), Number Ones (2009) and Icon: Number Ones (2010).

== Commercial performance ==
"When I Think of You" became Jackson's first number-one single on the US Billboard Hot 100, spending two weeks atop the chart, keeping Glass Tiger's "Don't Forget Me (When I'm Gone)" from reaching the top. After "When I Think of You" reached number one, it made Jackson and her brother Michael Jackson the first, and only siblings to both have solo number-one singles on the Hot 100. It also reached number three on the Hot Black Singles chart (making it the only single from the Control album that did not top the R&B chart) and number one on the Hot Dance Club Play chart in 1986. "When I Think of You" was the 32nd biggest Hot 100 single of 1986, as well as the 47th biggest Hot R&B/Hip-Hop Songs single of 1986 and the 22nd biggest Hot Dance Club Play single of 1986.

== Music video ==
The music video for "When I Think of You" finds Jackson going around a neighborhood. Each location she visits has the same mysterious man in different costumes saying a brief statement to her and then vanishing as she turns around. The director of "When I Think of You", Julien Temple, would later direct Jackson's "Alright" video. Some scenes were staged by Hollywood choreographer Michael Kidd. The video was choreographed by Paula Abdul.

The video uses an edit of the 12-inch dance remix version of the song instead of the album version.

In February 2007, the video was made available on the iTunes Store. Jackson would later repeat the same type of format for her video "Rock with U" from 2008's Discipline.

== Live performances ==
Jackson has performed the song on all of her tours, Rhythm Nation 1814 Tour, Janet World Tour, The Velvet Rope Tour, All for You Tour, Rock Witchu Tour, Number Ones: Up Close and Personal, Unbreakable World Tour, and State of the World Tour. Jackson included the song at her 2019 Las Vegas residence Janet Jackson: Metamorphosis. It was also included on her special concert series Janet Jackson: A Special 30th Anniversary Celebration of Rhythm Nation in 2019. In 2023, Jackson performed the song on her Janet Jackson: Together Again tour.

== Track listings ==
US 7-inch single

1. "When I Think of You" – 3:56
2. "Pretty Boy" – 6:32

UK 7-inch single

1. "When I Think of You" – 3:56
2. "Come Give Your Love to Me" – 5:03

US 12-inch single

1. "When I Think of You" (Dance Remix) – 6:12
2. "When I Think of You" (Instrumental) – 4:00
3. "When I Think of You" (Extra Beats) – 2:00
4. "When I Think of You" (Dub/A capella) – 3:15

== Remixes ==
Jimmy Jam & Terry Lewis mixes

- "When I Think of You" (Dance Remix) – 6:12
- "When I Think of You" (Dub/A capella) – 3:15
- "When I Think of You" (Extra Beats) – 2:00

Deep Dish mixes

- "When I Think of You" (Deep Dish Chocolate City Mix) – 9:35
- "When I Think of You" (Deep Dish Quiet Storm Dub) – 7:52
- "When I Think of You" (Deep Dish Dished Out Bums) – 11:22

Heller & Farley mixes

- "When I Think of You" (Heller & Farley Project Mix) – 10:46
- "When I Think of You" (Heller & Farley Project Mix - UK Edit) – 6:58
- "When I Think of You" (Junior Trackhead Joint) – 7:08

David Morales mixes

- "When I Think of You" (Morales Extended House Mix '95) – 7:43
- "When I Think of You" (Morales House Mix '95) – 4:33
- "When I Think of You" (Morales House Mix '95 - 12-inch UK Edit) – 6:22
- "When I Think of You" (Morales House Mix '95 - 7-inch UK Edit) – 3:30
- "When I Think of You" (Morales Crazy Love Mix) – 8:45
- "When I Think of You" (Morales Crazy Love Mix - UK Edit) – 7:08
- "When I Think of You" (Morales Classic Club Mix) – 6:57
- "When I Think of You" (Morales Jazzy Mix) – 10:19
- "When I Think of You" (Morales Drum Mix) – 5:10
- "When I Think of You" (Morales Incredible Boss Dub) – 7:12

== Charts ==
=== Weekly charts ===
Chart (1986)	Peak position
Australia (Kent Music Report)	53
Belgium (Ultratop 50 Flanders)	8
Canada Top Singles (RPM)	6
Canada Adult Contemporary (RPM)	7
Canada Retail Singles (The Record)	15
Europe (European Hot 100 Singles)	22
Ireland (IRMA)	10
Luxembourg (Radio Luxembourg)	7
Netherlands (Dutch Top 40)	3
Netherlands (Single Top 100)	2
New Zealand (Recorded Music NZ)	23
Panama (UPI)	4
UK Singles (Official Charts)	10
US Billboard Hot 100	1
US Adult Contemporary (Billboard)	10
US Dance Club Songs (Billboard)	1
US Dance Singles Sales (Billboard)	3
US Hot R&B/Hip-Hop Songs (Billboard)	3
US Cash Box Top 100	1
West Germany (GfK)	36

=== Year-end charts ===
Chart (1986)	Position
Belgium (Ultratop 50 Flanders)	55
Canada Top Singles (RPM)	58
Netherlands (Dutch Top 40)	52
Netherlands (Single Top 100)	18
US Billboard Hot 100	32
US Dance Club Songs (Billboard)	22
US Dance Singles Sales (Billboard)	24
US Hot R&B/Hip-Hop Songs (Billboard)	47
US Cash Box Top 100	28

Chart (1995)^{1}	Position
UK Club Chart (Music Week)	1

^{1}Remix

== Certifications ==
Region	Certification	Certified units/sales
United States (RIAA)	Platinum	1,000,000^{‡}
^{‡} Sales+streaming figures based on certification alone.
