= Janet Jackson (TV series) =

- Promotional poster
- Genre: Documentary
- Directed by: Benjamin Hirsch
- Starring: Janet Jackson
- Countries of origin: United Kingdom; United States
- Original language: English
- No. of seasons: 1
- No. of episodes: 4

Production
- Executive producers: Janet Jackson; Randy Jackson; Kevin Macdonald; Rick Murray
- Cinematography: Marcus Durian; Allen Ho; Nick Avery
- Running time: 44 minutes
- Production company: Workerbee

Original release
- Network: A&E and Lifetime (United States); Sky Documentaries and NOW (United Kingdom)
- Release: 28 January – 29 January 2022

Janet Jackson (stylized as JANET JACKSON.) is a limited-run documentary television series produced by American singer Janet Jackson and her brother Randy Jackson, and directed by Benjamin Hirsch. The series was developed over a period of three years by Rick Murray at Workerbee Documentary Films who executive produced. The documentary series premiered 28 January 2022, with the first two episodes of the four-part series airing on Lifetime and A&E simultaneously in the United States. The next two episodes aired the following night, 29 January. On 29 January 2022, Jackson previewed a clip of a new song, "Luv I Luv", during the end credits of the last episode. The documentary premiered in the United Kingdom on Sky Documentaries and streaming service NOW on 31 January 2022.

== Conception and development ==
In 2017, Jackson contacted English production company, Workerbee, to film footage of her on tour. Filming commenced that same year while Jackson was in the midst of her State of the World Tour. Producer Rick Murray explained, "We met Janet over five years ago. She lives in the UK a lot these days — she has family here — and through a joint person we both knew we were asked to go and cover some behind the scenes footage of one of her tours. I sent my best director, Ben [Hirsch], and I sort of said in his ear before he went … 'There's something bigger that we can do with Janet.' And we both love making movies, making feature documentaries, and we just thought there is a feature documentary here of her life that has not been told."

Jackson sent Murray and Hirsch 7,000 tapes from her personal archive. "She recorded everything, from the rehearsals at the Super Bowl that no one had seen before, through to the recording of [the music video] 'Scream,' in the studio recording Rhythm Nation, and no one had seen these tapes before. … It took us weeks and months to go through them." The series was filmed over a period of five years.

== Episodes ==
No.	Title	Original release date	Viewers (millions)
1	"Part 1"	28 January 2022	0.925 (A&E); 1.9 (Lifetime)
At the age of seven, Janet's father, tough talking Joe Jackson, put her to work in the family show. Her father never asked if she wanted to be a performer, so it's down to Janet to find her own path.
2	"Part 2"	28 January 2022	1.06 (A&E); 2.11 (Lifetime)
After two unsuccessful albums and a failed marriage to singer James DeBarge, Janet decides that if she's going to have a musical career, it will be on her own terms; she has to take control of her life.
3	"Part 3"	29 January 2022	1.22 (A&E); 1.79 (Lifetime)
Janet signs multi-million dollar sponsorship contracts, lands leading roles in feature films, and becomes a sex icon. But with the news of accusations about her brother Michael, her world comes crashing down.
4	"Part 4"	29 January 2022	1.34 (A&E); 1.88 (Lifetime)
Following the 2004 Super Bowl controversy, Janet finds herself blacklisted. Refusing to accept defeat, friends and fans fight for her right to be recognized as a true performing legend.

== Reception ==
The series averaged 3.1 million total viewers for its premiere on Lifetime and A&E, marking the highest non-fiction debut in viewership and ratings on cable since ESPN's Michael Jordan docuseries The Last Dance. The networks reported it also drew in 3.7 million video views across Lifetime and A&E's on-demand platforms, with linear and video views on digital combining to reach 15.7 million total viewers.

Above the typical averages for both networks, the documentary drew a 0.66 rating among adults 18–49 across its two hours, beating everything on Nielsen-measured TV in primetime. Janet Jackson also led cable among adults 18–34 and 25–54.

=== Critical response ===
On Rotten Tomatoes, the series holds an approval rating of 71% based on 24 reviews, with an average rating of 6.6/10. The website's critical consensus states: "Janet Jackson. feels too carefully curated by its own subject to yield any real insight, but it suffices as a nostalgic tribute to the pop icon."
