= Janet Jackson (album) =

Studio album by Janet Jackson
- Released: September 21, 1982
- Recorded: May–August 1982
- Studios: Allen Zentz Recording, Media West, Larrabee (Los Angeles); Conway, Wally Heider (Hollywood); Davlen (North Hollywood); Spindletop; Studio Masters
- Genres: Bubblegum pop; soft pop; dance; post-disco; R&B
- Length: 37:22 (vinyl); 38:50 (CD)
- Label: A&M
- Producers: René Moore; Angela Winbush; Foster Sylvers; Bobby Watson; Jerry Weaver

Janet Jackson chronology
Janet Jackson (1982)	Dream Street (1984)

Singles from Janet Jackson
- 1. "Young Love" Released: July 7, 1982; 2. "Come Give Your Love to Me" Released: January 10, 1983; 3. "Say You Do" Released: April 29, 1983; 4. "Don't Mess Up This Good Thing" Released: May 6, 1983 (UK); 5. "Love and My Best Friend" Released: 1983 (Brazil)

Janet Jackson is the debut studio album by American singer Janet Jackson, released in September 1982 by A&M Records. Janet Jackson is described as a dance and contemporary R&B record. Songwriters Angela Winbush and René Moore contributed to much of the album's lyrics. Moore and Winbush share production credits with Foster Sylvers, Jerry Weaver, and Bobby Watson. Upon release, Janet Jackson charted on the US Billboard 200 and in New Zealand. Two of the singles; "Young Love" and "Come Give Your Love to Me"; reached and had limited success on the US Billboard Hot 100 chart, but achieved success on the R&B charts along with "Say You Do". Jackson performed "Young Love" and "Say You Do" on American TV shows American Bandstand and Soul Train in 1982. The cover artwork of Jackson's body submerged in water was based on a photo of Elizabeth Taylor. The album sold 300,000 copies.

== Production ==
Jackson was sixteen when she began recording the album. She was assisted by her father, working with a number of songwriters and producers. Songwriters Angela Winbush and René Moore contributed to much of the album's lyrics. Moore and Winbush share production credits with Foster Sylvers, Jerry Weaver, and Bobby Watson.

The cover photo was shot by Harry Langdon in the swimming pool of the Jackson family's home. Jackson took the idea from a photograph of actress Elizabeth Taylor submerged in a swimming pool early in her career, which she found "dramatic".

== Release ==
The album was released in September 1982 by A&M Records. The Baltimore Afro-American noted that the album had been released, commenting that Jackson does not have any members of the Jackson family helping out, that she is relying "solely on her own talent", and that she has "the poised voice of a dynamic individual."

On the US Billboard 200, Janet Jackson reached its peak at number 63 the week of January 22, 1983. In New Zealand, the album peaked at number 44 on the New Zealand Albums Chart, during its only-week chart on April 17, 1983. As of 2003, Janet Jackson sold 82,000 copies through BMG Music Club in the United States, plus an additional 62,000 copies according to Soundscan since 1991. But the majority of the sales occurred before Soundscan began tracking sales in the US in 1991. Worldwide, the album has sold 300,000 copies, considered a failure at the time.

== Singles ==
Five singles were released from the album. "Young Love" was the first. It reached number 64 on the principal American singles chart, the Billboard Hot 100, and number six on the American Hot R&B/Hip-Hop Songs chart. In New Zealand, "Young Love" reached number 16. The second single from Janet Jackson was "Come Give Your Love to Me" and peaked at number 58 on the Hot 100. The follow-up single, "Say You Do", only appeared on the Hot R&B/Hip-Hop Songs and the Hot Dance Club Songs charts, peaking at numbers 15 and 11, respectively. The last two singles from the album, "Love and My Best Friend" and "Don't Mess Up This Good Thing" did not appear on any chart worldwide. In order to further promote Janet Jackson, she performed "Young Love" and "Say You Do" on American TV shows American Bandstand and Soul Train in 1982.

== Reception ==
In a retrospective summary for AllMusic, Stephen Thomas Erlewine felt the album had "no distinctive musical personality", feeling that the choice of songs was poor, with "Young Love" as the only song which "stands out among the undistinguished, sub-disco thumpers and drippy ballads". Bil Carpenter from the same website called Janet Jackson a "debut album of youth-oriented pop". The Rolling Stone Album Guide book stated that the album and its follow-up Dream Street (1984) sound like bland dance-music ready-mades.

== Track listing ==
No.	Title	Writer(s)	Producer(s)	Length
1.	"Say You Do"	René Moore; Angela Winbush	Bobby Watson; Moore; Winbush	6:49
2.	"You'll Never Find (A Love Like Mine)"	Moore; Winbush	Watson; Moore; Winbush	4:09
3.	"Young Love"	Moore; Winbush	Watson; Moore; Winbush	4:56
4.	"Love and My Best Friend"	Moore; Winbush	Watson; Moore; Winbush	4:47
5.	"Don't Mess Up This Good Thing"	Wardell Potts, Jr.; Barry Sarna; Dana Meyers	Foster Sylvers; Jerry Weaver	3:53
6.	"Forever Yours"	Phillip Ingram; Attala Zane Giles	Weaver; Charmaine Sylvers	4:57
7.	"The Magic Is Working"	Dorie Pride; Gene Dozier	F. Sylvers; Weaver	4:09
8.	"Come Give Your Love to Me"	Glen Barbee; C. Sylvers	F. Sylvers; Weaver	5:03
Total length:				38:50

- The original version of "Say You Do" (timed at 5:20) appears on the original LP and cassette releases of the album. The 12" single remix of "Say You Do" replaced the original on the CD version of the album and later releases.

== Personnel ==
- Janet Jackson – lead vocals
- Bobby Watson, James Jamerson, Jr., Leon Sylvers III, Ricky Smith – bass guitar
- Foster Sylvers – synthesizer, bass, drums, producer, rhythm arrangements
- Marlo Henderson, Greg Moore, Tony Maiden, Michael McGloiry,
  Fred Jenkins, Pepper Read – guitars
- Paulinho Da Costa, Edmund Sylvers, Melvin Webb – percussion
- André Fischer, John JR Robinson – drums
- Wardell Potts, Jr. – drums, rhythm arrangements
- René Moore – keyboards, background vocals, handclapping, producer, rhythm arrangements, Moog bass
- Angela Winbush – keyboards, background vocals, producer, rhythm arrangements
- Phillip Ingram – keyboards, string machine, background vocals
- Joey Gallo – keyboards, synthesizer
- Eddie Fluellen – string machine
- Jerry Hey – horn arrangements
- Humberto Gatica – mixing
- Stuart Furusho – engineer, mixing assistant
- Kirk Ferraioli – assistant engineer
- Gene Dozier – keyboards, horn arrangements, string arrangements
- Jeff Lorber, Barry Sarna, Ian Underwood – synthesizers
- Attala Zane Giles – background vocals
- Monica Joy Rhodes, Wendell C. Wellman – handclaps
- Dana Meyers – background vocals, vocal arrangement
- Howard Hewett – background vocals
- Chuck Beeson – art direction
- Bob Brown – engineer
- Jerry Knight – background, vocals
- Harry Langdon – photography
- Nyya Lark – assistant engineer
- Peggy McCreary – mixing assistant
- Taavi Mote – engineer
- Ambrose Price – handclapping
- Lynn Robb – design
- John Stronach – engineer
- Steve Thume – engineer
- Wally Traugott – mastering
- John VanNest – engineer, mixing assistant
- Trevor Veitch – contractor
- Gerald Vinci – concertmaster
- Jerry Weaver – producer, rhythm arrangements, synthesizer
- Benjamin Wright – string arrangements

== Charts ==
=== Weekly charts ===
Chart (1982–1983)	Peak position
New Zealand Albums (RMNZ)	44
South African Albums (RISA)	98
US Billboard 200	63
US Top R&B/Hip-Hop Albums (Billboard)	6
US Cash Box Top 200 Albums	79
US Cash Box Black Contemporary Top 75	6

=== Year-end charts ===
Chart (1983)	Position
US Top R&B/Hip-Hop Albums (Billboard)	10
