= Hitomi Shimatani discography =

This is the discography of Japanese pop singer, Hitomi Shimatani

== Albums ==
=== Studio albums ===
Title	Album details	Peak chart positions	Sales	Certifications
Title	Album details	JPN	Sales	Certifications
Papillon	Released: June 27, 2001; Label: Avex Trax; Formats: CD, digital download, streaming	7	JPN: 140,000	
Shanti	Released: June 12, 2002; Label: Avex Trax; Formats: CD, digital download, streaming	1	JPN: 430,000	RIAJ (phy.): Platinum
Gate: Scena III	Released: August 6, 2003; Label: Avex Trax; Formats: CD, digital download, streaming	2	JPN: 193,000	RIAJ (phy.): Platinum
Tsuioku + Love Letter	Released: September 1, 2004; Label: Avex Trax; Formats: CD, CD+DVD, digital download, streaming	7	JPN: 104,000	RIAJ (phy.): Gold
Heart & Symphony	Released: October 12, 2005; Label: Avex Trax; Formats: CD, CD+DVD, digital download, streaming	7	JPN: 47,000	
Prima Rosa	Released: March 7, 2007; Label: Avex Trax; Formats: CD, CD+DVD, digital download, streaming	16	JPN: 25,000	
Flare	Released: July 16, 2008; Label: Avex Trax; Formats: CD, CD+DVD, digital download, streaming	21	JPN: 13,000	
Honjitsu, Tōnai, Bōsho	Released: July 16, 2014; Label: Avex Trax; Formats: CD, CD+DVD, digital download, streaming	52	JPN: 2,300	
Misty	Released: November 28, 2018; Label: Avex Trax; Formats: CD, CD+DVD, digital download, streaming	62	JPN: 1,000	
LoveSong: My Song for You	Released: September 4, 2021; Label: AI.R Land Record; Formats: CD, CD+DVD, digital download, streaming	66	JPN: 1,000	
Liberty Bus	Released: September 3, 2025; Label: AI.R Land Record; Formats: CD, CD+5DVD, digital download, streaming	74	JPN: 700	

=== Extended plays ===
Title	Album details	Peak chart positions	Sales	Certifications
Title	Album details	JPN	Sales	Certifications
Amairo Maxi	Released: July 10, 2002; Label: Avex Trax; Formats: CD, digital download, streaming	7	JPN: 65,000	
Poinsettia: Amairo Winter Memories	Released: November 27, 2002; Label: Avex Trax; Formats: CD, digital download, streaming	5	JPN: 90,000	
Kokoro no Mama ni & Sessions	Released: February 3, 2016; Label: Avex Trax; Formats: CD, digital download, streaming	60	JPN: 2,100	
Brilliant	Released: July 24, 2019; Label: Avex Trax; Formats: CD, digital download, streaming	45	JPN: 1,700	

=== Compilation albums ===
Title	Album details	Peak chart positions	Sales	Certifications
Title	Album details	JPN	Sales	Certifications
Delicious!: The Best of Hitomi Shimatani	Type: Greatest hits album; Released: February 25, 2013; Label: Avex Trax; Formats: CD+DVD, CD, digital download, streaming	2	JPN: 460,000	RIAJ (phy.): 2x Platinum
Crossover	Type: Concept album; Released: February 23, 2005; Label: Avex Trax; Formats: CD, digital download, streaming	14	JPN: 35,000	
Otoko Uta: Cover Song Collection	Type: Cover album; Released: December 5, 2007; Label: Avex Trax; Formats: CD+DVD, CD, digital download, streaming	11	JPN: 40,000	
Best & Covers	Type: Greatest hits album and cover album; Released: July 29, 2009; Label: Avex Trax; Formats: CD+DVD, CD, digital download, streaming	12	JPN: 20,000	
Otoko Uta II: 20th Century Nostalgia	Type: Cover album; Released: January 27, 2010; Label: Avex Trax; Formats: CD+DVD, CD, digital download, streaming	35	JPN: 8,600	
Ura Best 2000-2004	Type: B-side compilation; Released: February 23, 2011; Label: Avex Trax; Formats: Digital download, streaming	—		
Ura Best 2005-2010	Type: B-side compilation; Released: February 23, 2011; Label: Avex Trax; Formats: Digital download, streaming	—		
Sign Music	Type: Concept album; Released: February 22, 2012; Label: Avex Trax; Formats: CD+DVD, CD, digital download, streaming	67	JPN: 2,000	
Hitomi Shimatani Best Collection	Type: Greatest hits album; Released: July 24, 2013; Label: Avex Trax; Formats: Digital download, streaming	—		
Hitomi Shimatani Anime Songs+	Type: Anime song compilation; Released: March 21, 2018; Label: Avex Trax; Formats: Digital download, streaming	—		

== Singles ==
=== 1990s-2000s ===
List of singles as lead artist
Title	Year	Peak chart positions		Sales	Certifications	Album
Title	Year	JPN	JPN Hot 100 (Note: The Billboard Japan Hot 100 chart was established in 2008.)	Sales	Certifications	Album
"Osaka no Onna"	1999	45		JPN: 4,700		Non-album single
"Kaihōku"	2000	28		JPN: 42,000		Papillon
"Papillon"	2001	14		JPN: 216,000		Papillon
"Ichiba ni Ikō"	2001	23		JPN: 57,000		Papillon
"Yasashii Kiss no Mitsukekata"	2001	17		JPN: 46,000		Shanti
"Shanti"	2002	7		JPN: 87,000		Shanti
"Amairo no Kami no Otome"	2002	4		JPN: 375,000	RIAJ (phy.): Platinum	Shanti
"Itsu no Hi ni ka..."	2002	10		JPN: 62,000	RIAJ (phy.): Gold	Gate: Scena III
"Akai Sabaku no Densetsu"	2003	12		JPN: 44,000	RIAJ (phy.): Gold	Gate: Scena III
"Genki o Dashite"	2003	10		JPN: 41,000	RIAJ (phy.): Gold	Gate: Scena III
"Perseus"	2003	8		JPN: 70,000	RIAJ (phy.): Gold	Gate: Scena III
"Yume Biyori"	2003	30		JPN: 55,000	RIAJ (phy.): Gold	Tsuioku+Love Letter
"Viola"	2004	17		JPN: 24,000		Tsuioku+Love Letter
"Jewel of Kiss"	2004	21		JPN: 17,000		Tsuioku+Love Letter
"Angelus"	2004	8		JPN: 50,000		Tsuioku+Love Letter
"Z! Z! Z! (Zip! Zap! Zipangu!)"	2004	8		JPN: 50,000		Tsuioku+Love Letter
"Garnet Moon"	2005	8		JPN: 81,000	RIAJ (phy.): Gold	Heart & Symphony
"Inori"	2005	8		JPN: 81,000	RIAJ (phy.): Gold	Heart & Symphony
"Mermaid"	2005	18		JPN: 20,400		Heart & Symphony
"Falco"	2005	11		JPN: 36,000		Heart & Symphony
"Mahiru no Tsuki"	2005	24		JPN: 10,000		Heart & Symphony
"Haru Machibito"	2006	19		JPN: 12,400		Prima Rosa
"Camellia"	2006	19		JPN: 12,400		Prima Rosa
"Destiny (Taiyō no Hana)"	2006	14		JPN: 27,000		Prima Rosa
"Koimizu (Tears of Love)"	2006	14		JPN: 27,000		Prima Rosa
"Pasio"	2006	12		JPN: 12,100		Prima Rosa
"Futari de Ii ja nai" (with Masayuki Suzuki)	2007	25		JPN: 13,000		Prima Rosa
"Dragonfly"	2007	29		JPN: 7,800		Flarę
"Neva Eva"	2007	22		JPN: 10,800		Flarę
"Shinku"	2007	14		JPN: 25,000		Flarę
"Ai no Uta"	2007	14		JPN: 25,000		Flarę
"Nakitai Nara"	2008	34	22	JPN: 5,000		Flarę
"Wake You Up"	2008	33	—	JPN: 6,000		Flarę
"Ame no Hi ni wa Ame no Naka o, Kaze no Hi ni wa Kaze no Naka o"	2008	33	31	JPN: 6,000		Flarę
"Marvelous"	2008	33	—	JPN: 6,000		Flarę
"Smiles"	2009	27	14	JPN: 5,500		Best & Covers
"—" denotes a recording that did not chart or was not released in that territory.

=== 2010s ===
List of singles as lead artist
Title	Year	Peak chart positions		Sales	Album
Title	Year	JPN	JPN Hot 100	Sales	Album
"Mayonaka no Guitar"	2010	64	8	JPN: 1,800	15th Anniversary Super Best
"Kantan ni Ieta nara"	2011	75	24	JPN: 1,000	15th Anniversary Super Best
"Shiawase Hakoberu Yō ni"	2012	175	—	JPN: 400	15th Anniversary Super Best
"Ureshii Koto"	2012	—	—		15th Anniversary Super Best
"Yabure Kabure"	2014	48	76	JPN: 1,500	Honjitsu, Tonai, Bōsho
"Matsuri da Wasshoi!"	2015	—	—		Non-album single
"Kokoro no Mama ni"	2016	—	—		Kokoro no Mama ni & Sessions
"Golden Lady"	2018	122	—	JPN: 500	Misty
"—" denotes a recording that did not chart or was not released in that territory.

=== 2020s ===
List of singles as lead artist
Title	Year	Peak chart positions		Sales	Album
Title	Year	JPN	JPN Hot 100	Sales	Album
"Tokyo Girl" (with Minmi)	2021	—	—		LoveSong: My Song For You
"Futaribocchi" (with Micro)	2021	—	—		LoveSong: My Song For You
"Will You Marry Me?"	2021	—	—		LoveSong: My Song For You
"Ganbaro, ne"	2021	—	—		LoveSong: My Song For You
"Na no Nai Hana"	2021	—	—		LoveSong: My Song For You
"Kimi wa Suteki sa Boku mo Muteki sa"	2021	—	—		LoveSong: My Song For You
"Tsuki no Waltz"	2021	—	—		LoveSong: My Song For You
"Mayonaka no Door (Stay With Me)"	2021	—	—		LoveSong: My Song For You
"Party Monster" (with Keizo Nakanishi)	2021	—	—		LoveSong: My Song For You
"Alice"	2021	—	—		LoveSong: My Song For You
"End Roll Made"	2021	—	—		LoveSong: My Song For You
"Yori Hayaku!"	2022	—	—		Non-album singles
"Mystic World"	2022	41	— (Note: "Mystic World" did not enter the Billboard Japan Hot 100, but peaked at number 43 on the Top Singles Sales chart.)	JPN: 680	Non-album singles
"Jūsangatsu no Christmas"	2022	63	— (Note: "Jūsan-gatsu no Christmas", "Tabi" and "Re:Start!" did not enter the Billboard Japan Hot 100; however, their physical release as a triple A-side single peaked at number 80 on the Top Singles Sales chart.)	JPN: 340	Non-album singles
"Tabi"	2023	63	—	JPN: 340	Non-album singles
"Re:Start!"	2023	63	—	JPN: 340	Non-album singles
"Ouchi ni Kaerō"	2023	—	—		Non-album singles
"Peace Stock" (with Hippy)	2023	—	—		Non-album singles
"Nagareboshi" (with Hippy)	2024	—	—		Non-album singles
"Keep a Smile"	2024	—	—		Liberty Bus
"Tabi"	2025	—	—		Liberty Bus
"Fun! Aloha!"	2025	—	—		Liberty Bus
"Love Hawaii"	2025	—	—		Liberty Bus
"Liberty Bus (Shiawase no Basho e)"	2025	—	—		Liberty Bus
"Jōnetsu no Matador"	2025	—	—		Liberty Bus
"Kiseki o Negau Yoru"	2025	—	—		Liberty Bus
"Taiyōshin Prism"	2026	63	— (Note: "Taiyōshin Prism" did not enter the Billboard Japan Hot 100, but peaked at number 57 on the Top Singles Sales chart.)	JPN: 800	TBA
"Kioku no Waltz"	2026	—	—		TBA
"—" denotes a recording that did not chart or was not released in that territory.

=== Other appearances ===
List of other appearances, showing other performing artists, year released, and album name
Title	Year	Other performer(s)	Album
"Funk Tank"	2004	m.c.A.T	Returns!
"Angelus"	2004		Best of Inuyasha II
"Falco" (TV size)	2005		The Law Of Music! The Law Of Ueki Original Soundtrack
"Sekaijū no Dare Yori Kitto" (crossover version) (Note: Miho Nakayama cover.)	2006		Beautiful Woman
"Anata To Ita Toki" (Note: Japanese-lyrics cover of the High School Musical song "When There Was Me and You" originally performed by Vanessa Hudgens.)	2007		High School Musical Original Soundtrack (Special Edition)
"Futari de Ii Janai" (album version)	2007	Masayuki Suzuki	Champagne Royale
"Miserarete" (Note: Judy Ongg cover.)	2007		Kyohei Tsutsumi Tribute: The Popular Music
"Destiny (Taiyō no Hana)" (Black Jack 21 Mix)	2007		Black Jack Best Album
"Anata ni Aete Yokatta" (Note: Kyoko Koizumi cover.)	2010	Junichi Inagaki	Otoko to Onna 3: Two Hearts Two Voices
"Egao no Ashita"	2010	Various	Non-album single
"Teami no Kutsushita" (Note: The Peanuts cover.)	2016	Rimi Natsukawa	The Peanuts: Tribute Songs
"Angelus"	2021		Inuyasha Best Album Shudaikashū
"Last Kiss"	2023	Hanako Hara	Tokyo City Pop Portrait
"One and Only"	2025	Hanako Hara, Shō Kurashina	Tokyo City Pop Vol.2 “Portrait”

== DVDs ==
- 8colors Clips+Live, October 23, 2002
- Vibration!: Live & Clips, March 17, 2004
- Concert Tour 2004, December 22, 2004
- Special Live: Crossover, June 15, 2005
- Visual Works 2004–2006, March 15, 2006
- Premium Live 2005: Heart & Symphony & More, March 15, 2006
- Special Live: Crossover II, December 13, 2006
- Live 2007 – Prima Rosa, September 12, 2007
- Crossover III: Premium Meets Premium, November 8, 2008
