= K-tai Investigator 7 =

Japanese television series

K-tai Investigator 7 (ケータイ捜査官７（セブン, Kētai Sōsakan Sebun; Cell Phone Investigator Seven) is a Japanese television drama that aired from April 2, 2008, to March 18, 2009, on TV Tokyo. It was a joint collaboration between WIZ and Production I.G. Takashi Miike oversaw the project. it is described as a science fiction tokusatsu action drama. It was replaced in its time slot by an animated cartoon, Mainichi Kaasan, after it ended. A second series titled K-tai Investigator 7: Next (ケータイ捜査官７NEXT, Kētai Sōsakan Sebun Nekusuto) was distributed online beginning in May 2009.

== Plot ==
Keita Amishima is a high school freshman who gets involved in Under Anchor, an organization formed to bring cyber criminals to justice using advanced technology. Taking the place of a previous Under Anchor agent, Keita is paired up with Phone Braver 7, a cellphone robot. Together, the two track down the high-tech criminals as well as their benefactor, the renegade Phone Braver 01. But in the process, the two learn of a conspiracy within Anchor itself tied to its mysterious ex-agent Magira.

== Characters ==
=== Under Anchor ===
Under Anchor (アンダーアンカー, Andā Ankā) is a branch of Anchor, a major cellular telephone service provider, that carries out investigative field missions related to data and technology crimes. It created and maintains the Phone Bravers. Anchor has a network supervising system named Eliza (エライザ, Eraiza), which web access and hacking by the Phone Bravers are performed through.

- Keita Amishima (網島 ケイタ, Amishima Keita): A high school freshman who preferred not to make new friends in school, but becomes buddies with Seven after meeting his predecessor Takimoto when he was to meet a friend of his at Mt. Fuji, and becomes an Under Anchor agent in training, eventually becoming full-fledged after passing the "Last Day on Earth" simulation. He and Seven were later abducted by Magira and Zero-One with Keita tested with Seven's life on the line by going to every place to every major event he's been to since being Seven's partner, playing in Magira's plan to induce another Parallel Decentralized Link. Though chained up, Keita manages to convince Zero-One to spare Seven. As a result, Keita initially attempts to take Zero-One under his care, only for the Phone Braver to suddenly leave him with a text message revealing a possible mole within Anchor (later revealed to be Yuto Date). Regardless, Zero-One has taken Keita up on his offer and visits his house on occasion for recharges and also to cause general mischief.
- Daiki Kirihara (桐原 大貴, Kirihara Daiki): Buddied with Third, Kirihara comes off strong and hard on others, especially Keita. He is a former police officer. Although he hates technology, he joins Under Anchor to be proven wrong about his feelings towards it. Kirihara was banned from missions for one month after the Parallel Decentralized Link incident, after which he was reinstated. His parents and younger brother were killed 13 years ago by phantom killer named Akatsuki. He is a secret fan of Hitomi Shimatani, and is jealous when he sees Seven receive a kiss from her.
- Sōsuke Takimoto (滝本 壮介, Takimoto Sōsuke): Seven's original buddy, a level-headed investigator with feelings for Chigusa. He is mortally wounded when attempting to save Keita during a case. Seeing something of himself in Keita, he hands Seven over to him before dying due to his injuries. Keita eventually joins Under Anchor after the incident, seeing Sōsuke as his initial inspiration.
- Chigusa Mimasaka (美作 千草, Mimasaka Chigusa): Head of the special investigation team of Under Anchor and former buddy of Phone Braver 2 until she is scrapped by 01. Chigusa is very serious with her missions and work. When Tada resurfaced, Mimasaka is forced to team up 01 to stop save Keita, making her peace with him as a result.
- Tōko Asano (麻野 瞳子, Asano Tōko): An agent of Under Anchor, a lively girl who is Phone Braver 4's Buddy and oversaw Keita when he was a trainee. Tōko is also a romantic type, although she seems to jinx everyone around her whenever she's in love and gets them involved in her affairs.
- Gannosuke Blackbird (ガンノスケ・ブラックバード, Gan'nosuke Burakkubādo): Appeared in Sōsuke Takimoto Case File. Buddied with Roku, an agent who belongs to the overseas branch of Under Anchor and is active mainly in Europe. He is a big man topping 2m, but he is stoop-shouldered and looks unreliable. He is a former member of the SAS.
- Kōhei Mito (水戸 幸平, Mito Kōhei): Head of the development team of Under Anchor, in charge of repairing damaged Phone Bravers. Usually friendlily called "Goinkyo" (ご隠居; meaning "retired person") by members of Anchor, Mito was the man who brought Date and Sōda together and played a part in the Phone Braver concept when inspired by a girl named Yuuri. He is also the one who created the alien invasion-like training exercise called "The Last Day on Earth" as a means to initiate new agents. He is a fan of Hitomi Shimatani.
- Mayuko Hasekura (支倉 真由子, Hasekura Mayuko): A member of the development team of Under Anchor. She is a very cheerful and upbeat girl who helps keep the Phone Bravers well-maintained.
- Mutsuki Sakaki (榊 睦月, Sakaki Mutsuki): A member of the development team of Under Anchor Tech. She seems to have shown an interest in Hirofumi.
- Sayaka Kisaragi (如月 さやか, Kisaragi Sayaka): A member of the development team of Under Anchor Tech.
- Yayoi Kageyama (影山 弥生, Kageyama Yayoi): A member of the development team of Under Anchor Tech.
- Hirofumi Morishita (森下 博文, Morishita Hirofumi): A member of the development team of Under Anchor, usually called "Kikai-kun" (キカイ君, meaning "machine boy") by fellow Under Anchor members. Formerly an asocial tech-whiz who was found by Mito at a Nation High School Robot Contest and a fan of the superhero manga Silverman, Kikai-kun is the one who built the Boost Phones, their abilities based on the manga. Though he saw the Phone Bravers as mere machines, his meeting with Keita changes his views and he wishes to understand Keita. He was also involved in an incident in which he was framed for stealing copies of some rare Silverman manga, when in reality, it was another man who dressed up as Hirofumi and used face-modeling technology to doctor the surveillance video to make him look like he did it. He was able to clear his name with Keita and Seven's help, and also seems to have shared a mutual interest with Mutsuki Sakaki.
- Sōichirō Hasumi (蓮見 壮一郎, Hasumi Sōichirō): An operator of Under Anchor.
- Shūhei Tsujikaze (辻風 修平, Tsujikaze Shūhei): An operator of Under Anchor.
- Shinichi Mitarai (御手洗 真一, Mitarai Shin'ichi): An operator of Under Anchor.
- Kaori Amane (天音 佳織, Amane Kaori): An operator of Under Anchor.
- Sakura Mochizuki (望月 咲桜, Mochizuki Sakura): An operator of Under Anchor.
- Kyōko Fujimiya (藤宮 今日子, Fujimiya Kyōko): An operator of Under Anchor.
- Yūto Date (伊達 雄人, Date Yūto): Advisor of Anchor, he was the one who set up the robotics concept of the Phone Bravers. He was installed as the CEO as the successor to Sōda. He betrays Under Anchor by helping to develop Gene alongside Magira but was deceived by Magira.
- Masayoshi Sōda (宗田 雅芳, Sōda Masayoshi): CEO of Anchor, providing the AI system used by the Phone Braves. Taking the blame of the event caused by Magira and Zero-One, he resigned as Anchor's CEO, but would retain his duty as leader of Under Anchor.

=== Phone Bravers ===
The Phone Bravers (フォンブレイバー, Fon Bureibā) are small robots created by Under Anchor, able to transform into cellphones and link up to anything from machines to the Internet. Only seven have been made and given a human "Buddy" (バディ, Badi) who protects the Phone Bravers while in a defenseless position. The reason for the small number of Bravers is due to their ability to execute "Parallel Decentralized Link" (並列分散リンク, Heiretsu Bunsan Rinku), which is considered a dangerous but powerful ability, as it can combine the Phone Bravers' AI, enhancing their consciousness and possibly turning the combined 'entity' against humanity. The act was committed three times with the actions behind the first one a mystery. The Phone Bravers are all modeled after the SoftBank 815T.

- Phone Braver 7 (フォンブレイバー７（セブン）, Fon Bureibā Sebun): Called "Seven" (セブン, Sebun), a "by the book" sort and latest Phone Braver to be created, colored silver. His model number is PB-CMP-TEST07. Originally buddied with Takimoto, Seven gains a new buddy in Keita Amishima and makes it his duty not to have Keita suffer the same fate as Takimoto. His biggest pet peeve is being thrown into the air, usually yelling "Cell phones are not for throwing!". In some Internet circles, he is known as "Angel-K", a walking cellphone thought to ward off the supposed curse brought on by Zero-One. Seven is strong enough to take down four grown men on his own, as was demonstrated when he was angry at being thrown around like a toy by members of the Kantō Denryūkai.
- Phone Braver 6 (フォンブレイバー６（ロク）, Fon Bureibā Roku): Appeared in Sōsuke Takimoto Case File. Called "Roku" (ロク, Roku; meaning six) and buddied with Blackbird, colored green with an arabesque design. He is a character like an Edokko. He is the only Phone Braver who is actively working while not officially registered yet. He is the same model as Seven, and his model number is PB-CMP-TEST06.
- Phone Braver 5 (フォンブレイバー５（ファイブ）, Fon Bureibā Faibu): Called "Five" (ファイブ, Faibu), colored brown. Its model number is PB-CMP-TEST05. Although it was under development as a mass-produced type Phone Braver a year ago, it was broken by Zero-One when he took its Lambda Chip, tied to the Lambda Abstract, but it was developed as Gene (ジーン, Jīn) with the same structure as Five by Magira and Date.
- Phone Braver 4 (フォンブレイバー４（フォース）, Fon Bureibā Fōsu): Called "Fourth" (フォース, Fōsu) and buddied with Tōko, colored pink and model number PB-CMP-TEST04. She is of the same model as Third and similar to her partner in personality, only more flighty. While attempting to stop the Under Anchor hacking a year ago, her program was frozen by Zero-One's virus, shutting her down and leaving her in Maintenance since.
- Phone Braver 3 (フォンブレイバー３（サード）, Fon Bureibā Sādo): Called "Third" (サード, Sādo) and buddied with Kirihara, colored blue, model number is PB-CMP-TEST03. He is a kind, caring character compared to his Buddy. A year ago, while attempting to undo the virus caused by Zero-One, he fearfully refused to support Second out of fear of being corrupted by Zero-One's attack. He eventually overcame his fear to be more active in stopping Zero-One, ending up in Maintenance for a short time after executing a flawed Parallel Decentralized Link with Seven. He later pulled off the same stunt to trace Seven, linking with Zero-One in the process. Another incident with Third occurred when he had suddenly forgotten Keita, who was forced to obtain e-mail addresses of all of his acquaintances in order to restore his memory. In reality, it was Magira who caused the incident and took Keita out of Third's memory as a test.
- Phone Braver 2 (フォンブレイバー２（セカンド）, Fon Bureibā Sekando): Called "Second" (セカンド, Sekando), the first test model and buddied with Chigusa, colored gold and model number PB-CMP-TEST02. She was rolled out with Zero-One on the same day, her mobility damaged when he ran off. Though she attempted to protect the Under Anchor network, Second was broken in two by Zero-One. Her body was returned to Chigusa a year after the incident.
- Phone Braver 01 (フォンブレイバー０１（ゼロワン）, Fon Bureibā Zero Wan): Called "Zero-One" (ゼロワン, Zero Wan), he is the prototype Phone Braver whose model number is PB-CMP-PROT01. Zero-One become a rogue after failing to take the pain of losing three partners (Yoshio Tanaka (田中 良夫, Tanaka Yoshio), Kō Satō (佐藤 孝, Satō Kō), and Takeo Suzuki (鈴木 武雄, Suzuki Takeo)) changed him, causing him to bitterly run off, injuring Second in the process. Two months later, Zero-One attempts to hack the Under Anchor facilities in order to find a human to answer his reason for existing, damaging three Phone Bravers before running off. After using hi-tech criminals for his own affairs to understand why he exists, often abandoning them when they fail to answer him, he manages to find an almost ideal Buddy in Magira, though the Magira is more of a benefactor that he turns too if damaged or they formulate a plan together. The actions of Zero-One were spoken of in some Internet circles, gaining the name of "Devil-K", who, according to urban legend, brings about a lethal curse to any who witnessed him. However, Zero-One develops an obsession with Seven and Keita, wanting to understand their concept of a Buddy. After meeting a blind girl named Junko Kakeuchi whose story made him curious to understand her forgiving nature towards the man who caused her blindness and the concept of "time" she gave him, Zero-One aided Magira in abducting Seven to use him in a scheme to hack Eliza again and cause a massive blackout worldwide. However, after seeing how far Keita would go for Seven, Zero-One gives up and frees Seven. Though he was offered to live with him, Zero-One leaves Keita while revealing the true enemy is within Anchor itself. Overtime, 01's change of heart is noticed by Under Anchor, explaining it because of Keita and Seven, vowing to protect should Magira take his schemes too far.
- Phone Braver Next (フォンブレイバー ネクスト, Fon Bureibā Nekusuto): Called "Next" (ネクスト, Nekusuto). He appears in the sequel series K-tai Investigation 7: Next. His model number is PB-S-NEXT-0# and was created by Under Anchor's Space organization called Answer for their space project.

==== Boost Phones ====
The Boost Phones (ブーストフォン, Būsuto Fon) are attachment robots created by Under Anchor and are in Eliza usually. The Phone Bravers can attach the Boost Phones unto themselves to increase their abilities depending on the crisis at hand as well as the ability needed. The Boost Phones may also be used independently of a Phone Braver for some functions.

- Boost Phone Seeker (ブーストフォンシーカー, Būsuto Fon Shīkā): A video camera-phone, allowing a Phone Braver to have a wide range of vision and see through objects. Seven usually uses Seeker. On its own it can produce strong flashes of light and be used as a remote camera that sends its feed to Seven. Its model number is BST-P001.
- Boost Phone Speaker (ブーストフォンスピーカー, Būsuto Fon Supīka): Allows a Phone Braver to listen to sound waves and use defensive sound wave attacks. Third usually uses Speaker until Seven gained use of it. On its own it can record and play many sounds for various reasons. Its model number is BST-P002.
- Boost Phone Analyzer (ブーストフォンアナライザー, Būsuto Fon Anaraizā): Gives a Phone Braver high network capabilities, only Zero-One uses it. It can do the physical work such as electrical wiring using a manipulator. Its model number is BST-P003. It is considered abandoned by Under Anchor now.
- Boost Phone Demolition (ブーストフォンデモリッション, Būsuto Fon Demorisshon): Gives a Phone Braver a chainsaw-like weapon, only Zero-One uses it. Its model number is BST-P004. It is considered abandoned by Under Anchor now.
- Boost Phone Medic (ブーストフォンメディック, Būsuto Fon Medikku): Gives a Phone Braver the ability to create computer vaccines, and a tolerance to computer viruses. Its model number is BST-P005.
- Boost Phone Grinder (ブーストフォングラインダー, Būsuto Fon Guraindā): Gives a Phone Braver the ability to deconstruct surface matter like walls. First used by Seven, though Grinder was still not fully perfected for Phone Bravers to use until later. On its own it can create small quakes. It created by Hirofumi, using the Silverman manga as an inspiration. Its model number is BST-P006.
- Boost PC Solid Driver (ブーストＰＣソリッドドライバー, Būsuto PīShī Soriddo Doraibā): A mini laptop computer that can be used as a kind of power suit for Seven. It can attach two Boost Phones. Its model number is BST-P007.
- Boost Phone Observer (ブーストフォン オブザーバー, Būsuto Fon Obuzābā): A Boost Phone that appears in the sequel and acts as an observer to investigations and how to judge them. Its model number is BST-C002.
- Searcher (アクセルデバイス サーチャー, Akuserudebaisu Sāchā): A flashlight for the Phone Bravers to use in dark areas. Its model number is AD-S001.
- Detector (アクセルデバイス ディテクター, Akuserudebaisu Deitekutā): A tool used to detect objects and people with a range on 3 square kilometers. Its model number is AD-S002.
- Chrono (アクセルデバイス クロノ, Akuserudebaisu Kurono): A communication device for the Buddy and an extra power source or the Phone Braver. Its model number is AD-S003.

=== Police ===
The Investigation Dept 7 (捜査７課, Sōsa Nana Ka) is the branch of the Police who are investigating high-tech crimes and the events relating to the "walking cellphones."

- Katsuhiko Shimura (志村 克彦, Shimura Katsuhiko): A senior detective who refuses to believe the existence of "walking cellphones." His views change after learning about the existence of the Under Anchor and the Phone Bravers through Keita. He advises Keita not to overdo it and to leave the more dangerous jobs "to the adults". His belief is to only arrest villains and no one else.
- Shūgo Kaito (海斗 修吾, Kaito Shūgo): Shimura's young partner, he believes wholeheartedly in the existence of the "walking cellphones," once believing that they were a by-product of alien technology. He starts a website similar to Karen's.

=== Amishima family ===
- Kentaro Amishima (網島 健太郎, Amishima Kentarō): Keita's father, a laid back guy. Sensing that his family was drifting apart at one time, he tries to enter the world of politics when he puts himself in the running for ward councilman, however, the rest of his family does not agree at first, as he had failed to ask them what they thought. He apologizes and considers quitting, however, his family encourages him to continue. He would eventually lose the ward councilman spot by 5% of the votes. Regardless, his family (minus Keita, who instead gave him a consoling text message) throws a consolation party for him, causing him to break into tears of joy.
- Harumi Amishima (網島 春美, Amishima Harumi): Keita's mother; she worries about whatever trouble her son gets himself into. A literature fan.
- Karen Amishima (網島 可憐, Amishima Karen): Keita's sister, who keeps up with the Internet rumors about "walking cellphones". She starts a website for people to share stories about the "walking cellphones", while posing as a middle-aged man and a female counselor..

=== Meiyō High School ===
Meiyō High School (明陽高校, Meiyō Kōkō) is the high school Keita attends.

- Yūri Midō (御堂 優璃, Midō Yūri): She tries to get Keita to open up, having feelings for him. After the Devil-K incident, Yūri starts to writes her own Cellphone Stories
- Satoshi Serizawa (芹沢 智, Serizawa Satoshi): He usually calls Keita "Kūki-kun" (空気くん, meaning "airhead"), due to his supposed empty-headedness and coldness towards other classmates, especially Yūri. As Keita becomes more responsible as a result of his continuing work with Under Anchor, Yūri notes how Satoshi and others have stopped calling him such.
- Yōko Igarashi (五十嵐 陽子, Igarashi Yōko): Yūri's friend. She has a great-grandmother who lives in the country, and a great-grandfather, Seiichi Oootaki, who served in World War II. He had originally died, but with help from a mysterious call from the future (in reality, it was Keita and Seven who had connected to his radio signal through one of Mayuko's experiments), he lived on, causing an unexpected time change of which only Keita is aware of. After Seiichi meets Keita in person, he thanks him for giving him the courage to live on.
- Kenta of Jersey (ジャージの健太, Jāji no Kenta): The physical-education teacher who is always shown wearing a sports jersey.

=== People concerned with Under Anchor ===
- Kurando Magira (間明 蔵人, Magira Kurando): Ex-agent of Under Anchor who was to become Phone Braver 5's Buddy until it was destroyed, Magira left the organization and was believed to have died. However, Magira hates Anchor and wants to mellow out the Phone Braver Project by setting out a chain of events leading to Parallel Decentralized Link between Seven and Third. Soon after, Magira sets up a meeting with Keita and Seven, revealing the nature behind his attack and having Zero-One show off the full brutality of a Phone Braver's power. He understands Zero-One's temperament and knows that if he fails, Zero-One will leave him only to come back later. He later reveals himself when he blocks Kirihara from Keita's aid in an attempt to win his aid before being hand cuffed. However, Magira escaped before the authorities arrived. He was installed as the president of Flanet Corporation (フラネット社, Furanetto Sha) and put Gene on the market.
- Akira Karasaki (唐崎 晶, Karasaki Akira): A talented programmer around Keita's age and daughter of the president of the Software Company "Net Guardian". She doesn't go to school anymore, because of her high intellect and abilities, and works at "Net Guardian" instead. Since she got to know about Anchor through the Net Guardian Incident, she wants to join the organization. Because she also hinted that she quit school because she didn't get along with the "idiots" and has a pretty short friend list in her phone, she is kind of lonely. Though she seems to be more cheerful around Amishima, and gives him her number. Akira later recruits the aid of Keita and Yūri to investigate the Happy Picnic Land amusement park to uncover the illegal activity involving the use of a wave to manipulating people's emotions.
- Hidehiko Motomiya (元宮 英彦, Motomiya Hidehiko): The secretary of the member of the Diet connected with Anchor. He is also one of Magira's conspirators.

=== Others ===
- Kantō Denryūkai (関東電龍会, meaning "Kanto Electric Dragon Organization"): The net gang which is composed of the boss and three gangsters.
- Tatsurō Ōe (大江 達郎, Ōe Tatsurō): Keita's best friend before moving to Tokyo.
- Toshiki Tada: A cracker who remained an enigma while robbing banks until was arrested by Takimoto and Chiasa, vowing to get them back. After getting out of jail, he hijacks Eliza after kidnaping Keita and Seven with the intent on exposing Under Anchor to the world. However, he is arrested again.

== Episodes ==
1. A Walking Cellphone!?/Connection Bonds (ケータイ、歩く！？／つながる絆, Kētai Aruku!?/Tsunagaru Kizuna) (directed by Takashi Miike)
2. Black Cellphone (黒いケータイ, Kuroi Kētai)
3. An Agent's Job (エージェントの仕事, Ējento no Shigoto)
4. Solo Mission (ソロ・ミッション, Soro Misshon)
5. City Legend Devil-K (都市伝説デビルＫ, Toshi Densetsu Debiru Kei)
6. Escaping Love (逃げる恋, Nigerukoi)
7. Literature Scolding (ブンゴー、怒る, Bungō, Ikaru)
8. Trap Building (トラップ・ビル, Torappu Biru)
9. Buddy System (バディシステム, Badi Shisutemu)
10. Counter Attack! (カウンター・アタック！, Kauntā Atakku!)
11. Thank You Blitzkrieg (サンキュー電撃作戦, Sankyū Dengeki Sakusen)
  - K-tai Mecha Great Gathering! (ケータイメカ大集合!, Kētai Meka Daishūgō!)
12. Last Day on Earth (T_T) (地球最後の日（Ｔ＿Ｔ）, Chikyū Saigo no Hi (T_T))
13. Earthquake! Grinder (激震！グラインダー, Gekishin! Guraindā)
14. Seven's Lullaby (セブンの子守唄, Sebun no Komoriuta)
15. Friendly Magic (なかよくなる魔法, Nakayokunaru Mahō)
16. Seven vs. Zero-One! (セブン対ゼロワン！, Sebun tai Zero Wan!)
17. The Distant Summer Sky (遠い夏の空と, Tōi Natsu no Sora to)
18. URL
19. Out of Range Woman: Part 1 (圏外の女 前編, Kengai no Onna Zenpen)
20. Out of Range Woman: Part 2 (圏外の女 後編, Kengai no Onna Kōhen)
21. Dark Past (黒い過去, Kuroi Kako)
22. Heart's Light (こころのひかり, Kokoro no Hikari)
23. K-tai Dies (ケータイ死す, Kētai Shisu) (directed by Takashi Miike)
  - K-tai Talk (ケータイ語る, Kētai Kataru)
24. Amishima Family's Greatest Crisis (網島家最大の危機, Amishima Ke Saidai no Kiki)
25. The Amusement Park Where the Angel Falls (天使のふる遊園地, Tenshi no Furu Yūenchi)
26. What Ninja! (ニャンたる忍者！, Nyantaru Ninja!)
27. Probability of Unrequited Love (失恋のカクリツ, Shitsuren no Kakuritsu)
28. The Day When the K-tai Was Born (ケータイが生まれた日, Kētai ga Umareta Hi)
29. Start! Solid (発進！ソリッド, Hasshin! Soriddo)
30. Net Live Defense Command (ネットライブ防衛指令, Netto Raibu Bōei Shirei)
31. Zero-One, Runs (ゼロワン、走る, Zero-Wan Hashiru)
32. Space Virus (宇宙ウィルス, Uchū Wirusu)
33. Love Love ♥ Great Operation (ラブラブ♥大作戦, Raburabu Dai Sakusen)
  - Doki ♥ X'mas Investigator (ドキッ♥X'mas捜査官, Doki Kurisumasu Sōsakan)
34. Targeted Third (ねらわれたサード, Nerawareta Sādo)
35. Keita's Hatsuyume (ケイタのはつゆめ, Keita no Hatsuyume)
36. Friend (ともだち, Tomodachi)
37. Keita and Tatsurō (ケイタとタツロー, Keita to Tatsurō)
38. Someone Was Watching (誰かが見ていた, Dareka ga Miteita)
39. Unescapable Love (逃げられない恋, Nigerarenai Koi)
40. Kirihara and Third (桐原とサード, Kirihara to Sādo)
41. Seven's Dream (セブンの見る夢, Sebun no Miru Yume)
42. Wake-up Gene (目覚める遺伝子, Mezameru Idenshi)
43. True Enemy (真の敵, Shin no Teki)
44. Zero-One's Explanation (ゼロワンの解, Zero Wan no Kai)
45. Future Tomorrow: To the Adults of the Coming Era (明日未来～来るべき時代の大人達へ, Asu Mirai ~Kitaru beki Jidai no Otonatachi e) (directed by Takashi Miike)

== Novel ==
A novel published under the title K-tai Investigator 7: Sōsuke Takimoto Case File (ケータイ捜査官７ 滝本壮介の事件簿, Kētai Sōsakan Sebun: Takimoto Sōsuke no Jikenbo) was released on November 18, 2008. It is set after the Zero-One incident in episode 23.

== Cast ==
- Keita Amishima: Masataka Kubota (窪田 正孝, Kubota Masataka)
- Daiki Kirihara: Satoshi Matsuda (松田 悟志, Matsuda Satoshi)
- Sōsuke Takimoto: Kanji Tsuda (津田 寛治, Tsuda Kanji)
- Chigusa Mimasaka: Yuko Ito
- Tōko Asano: Yoko Mitsuya (三津谷 葉子, Mitsuya Yōko)
- Kōhei Mito: Mickey Curtis (ミッキー・カーチス, Mikkī Kāchisu)
- Mayuko Hasekura: Nao Nagasawa (長澤 奈央, Nagasawa Nao)
- Mutsuki Sakaki: Mizuho Hata (秦 みずほ, Hata Mizuho)
- Yayoi Kageyama: Natsuko Tatsumi (辰巳 奈都子, Tatsumi Natsuko)
- Sayaka Kisaragi: Natsumi Kamata (鎌田 奈津美, Kamata Natsumi)
- Hirofumi Morishita: Naoyuki Morita (森田 直幸, Morita Naoyuki)
- Sōichirō Hasumi: Daisuke Sano (佐野 大輔, Sano Daisuke)
- Shūhei Tsujikaze: Daisuke Satō (佐藤 大介, Satō Daisuke)
- Shinichi Mitarai: Hidekazu Asari (浅利 英和, Asari Hidekazu)
- Kaori Amane: Eri Hayama (葉山 恵里, Hayama Eri)
- Sakura Mochizuki: Mai Amano (あまの まい, Amano Mai)
- Kyōko Fujimiya: Rieko Ankyū (安久 理恵子, Ankyū Rieko)
- Yūto Date: Ikkei Watanabe (渡辺 いっけい, Watanabe Ikkei)
- Masayoshi Sōda: Toru Masuoka (益岡 徹, Masuoka Tōru)
- Phone Braver 7 (voice): Kunihiro Kawamoto (河本 邦弘, Kawamoto Kunihiro)
- Phone Braver 4 (voice): Saori Gotō (後藤 沙緒里, Gotō Saori)
- Phone Braver 3 (voice): Tokuyoshi Kawashima (川島 得愛, Kawashima Tokuyoshi)
- Phone Braver 2 (voice): Masako Katsuki (勝生 真沙子, Katsuki Masako)
- Phone Braver 01 (voice): Tomohiro Tsuboi (坪井 智浩, Tsuboi Tomohiro)
- Gene (voice): Ai Haruna
- Katsuhiko Shimura: Hiroshi Katsuno (勝野 洋, Katsuno Hiroshi)
- Shūgo Kaito: Yosuke Katsuno (勝野 洋輔, Katsuno Yōsuke)
- Kentaro Amishima: Hiromasa Taguchi (田口 浩正, Taguchi Hiromasa)
- Harumi Amishima: Noriko Watanabe (渡辺 典子, Watanabe Noriko)
- Karen Amishima: Reiko Igarashi (Igarashi Reiko)
- Yūri Midō: Natsuki Okamoto (岡本 奈月, Okamoto Natsuki)
- Satoshi Serizawa: Mikiya (未来弥, Mikiya)
- Yōko Igarashi: Nana Akiyama (秋山 奈々, Akiyama Nana)
- Kurando Magira: Hassei Takano
- Akira Karasaki: Rin Asuka
- Hidehiko Motomiya: Masaya Kikawada
- Kenta of Jersey: Seiji Chihara (千原 せいじ, Chihara Seiji) (Chihara Kyōdai (千原兄弟, Chihara Kyōdai))
- Tatsurō Ōe: Kazuma Sano (佐野 和真, Sano Kazuma)
- Newscaster: Erika Mine (峰 えりか, Mine Erika)
- Opening narration: Oki

== Songs ==
Opening theme

- "Wake You Up"
  - Lyrics: Shin Furuya (古屋 真, Furuya Shin)
  - Composition & Arrangement: Yasushi Sasamoto (笹本 安詞, Sasamoto Yasushi)
  - Artist: Hitomi Shimatani

Ending themes

- "Sands of time"
  - Artist, Composition, & Arrangement: Back-On
  - Lyrics: Teeda & Kenji03
  - Episodes: 1-13
- "Rain"
  - Lyrics: Olivia & Masumi Kawamura
  - Composition: Olivia & Rui
  - Arrangement: Rui & Kansei
  - Artist: Olivia
  - Episodes: 14-35
- "Yumemiru.."
  - Lyrics: Nanase Aikawa & Tetsuro Oda
  - Composition: Atsuhiro Watanabe & Tetsuro Oda
  - Arrangement: Wall 5
  - Artist: Nanase Aikawa
  - Episodes: 36-45

Insert songs

- "Himitsu no Uta" (ひみつのうた; Secret Song)
  - Lyrics: Masato Tanno (たんの まさと, Tan'no Masato)
  - Composition & Arrangement: Yoshihiro Ike (池 頼広, Ike Yoshihiro)
  - Artist: Keiko (ケイコ)
  - Episodes: 14
- "Oshichi no Komoriuta" (お七の子守唄; Oshichi's Lullaby)
  - Lyrics: Shūji Terayama (寺山 修司, Terayama Shūji)
  - Composition & Arrangement: Kenji Kawai (川井 憲次, Kawai Kenji)
  - Artist: Oshichi (お七, Oshichi) (Mabuki Andō (安藤 麻吹, Andō Mabuki))
  - Episodes: 20
- "Nakitai Nara" (泣きたいなら; If I Want to Cry)
  - Lyrics: Gorō Matsui (松井 五郎, Matsui Gorō)
  - Composition: Kaname Nemoto (根本 要, Nemoto Kaname)
  - Arrangement: Yūta Nakano (中野 雄太, Nakano Yūta)
  - Artist: Hitomi Shimatani
  - Episodes: 30
- "Ame no Hi ni wa Ame no Naka o Kaze no Hi ni wa Kaze no Naka o" (雨の日には 雨の中を 風の日には 風の中を; In the Rain when It's Rainy, In the Wind when It's Windy)
  - Lyrics: Mitsuo Aida (相田 みつを, Aida Mitsuo)
  - Composition: Akihito
  - Supervision: Mitsuo Aida Museum (相田みつを美術館, Aida Mitsuo Bijutsukan)
  - Artist: Hitomi Shimatani
  - Episodes: 30

== Video game ==
An adventure game called Mobile Investigator 7 DS: Buddy Sequence (ケータイ捜査官7DS バディシークエンス, Kētai Sōsakan 7 DS Badi Shīkuensu) was published by 5bp. for Nintendo DS on March 26, 2009, in Japan.
