= Gasogene =

Device for producing carbonated water

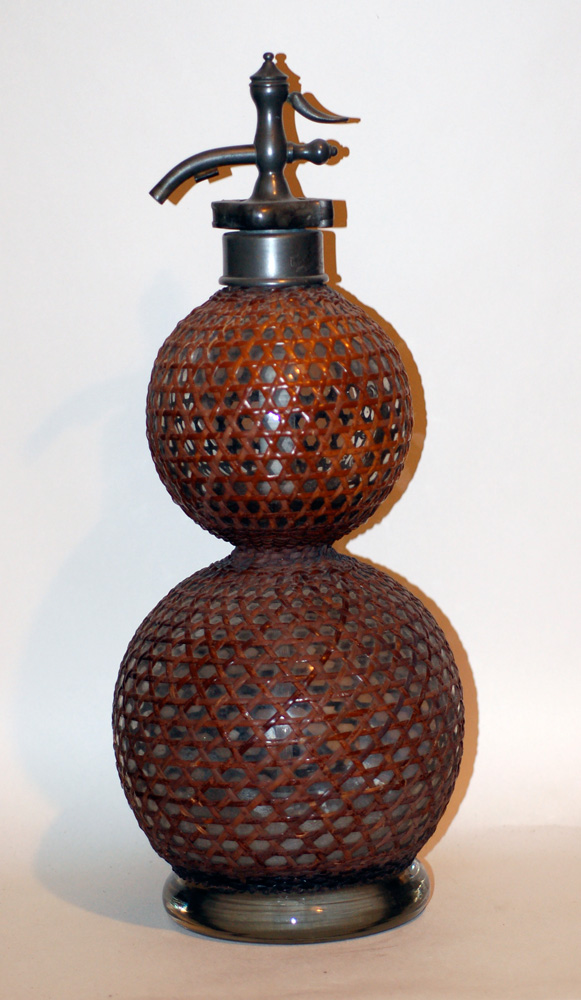
Late Victorian seltzogene made by British Syphon

The gasogene (or gazogene or seltzogene) is a late Victorian device for producing carbonated water. It consists of two linked glass globes: the lower contained water or other drink to be made fizzy, the upper a mixture of tartaric acid and sodium bicarbonate that reacts to produce carbon dioxide. The produced gas pushes the liquid in the lower container up a tube and out of the device. The globes are surrounded by a wicker or wire protective mesh, as they have a tendency to explode.

The earliest occurrence of the word noted in the Oxford English Dictionary dates from 1853, quoting a reference in Practical Mechanic's Journal on "Gaillard and Dubois' 'Gazogene' or Aerated Water apparatus".

== In popular culture ==
A gasogene is mentioned as a residential fixture at 221B Baker Street in Arthur Conan Doyle's Sherlock Holmes story "A Scandal in Bohemia": "With hardly a word spoken, but with a kindly eye, he waved me to an armchair, threw across his case of cigars, and indicated a spirit case and a gasogene in the corner." One is also mentioned in "The Adventure of the Mazarin Stone". The device plays a key role in Bernard Shaw's 1905 comic play Passion, Poison, and Petrifaction, Or The Fatal Gazogene.

The word is also used in Douglas Preston and Lincoln Child's novel Brimstone, published in 2005, and in their 2010 novel Fever Dream and 2013 novel "White Fire."

A gasogene is mentioned as being in the forensic laboratory of Dr. Kingsley, consultant forensic examiner of Scotland Yard in Alex Grecian's 2012 novel The Yard.

A gasogene is mentioned and its use described in Sherry Thomas's novel A Study in Scarlet Women (Book 1 of the Lady Sherlock series).

Amelia Peabody pulls a bottle of whiskey, a gasogene, and glasses from a hamper in order to make herself a whiskey and soda after getting her family on a train to Luxor in the novel The Golden One by Elizabeth Peters, a pen name of Barbara Mertz.

== See also ==
- Soda syphon
- SodaStream
