= Delicious =

Delicious may refer to:

== Fruits ==
- Golden Delicious, a cultivar of apple
- Red Delicious, several cultivars of apple

== Films ==
- Delicious (1931 film), a Hollywood musical
- Delicious (2021 film), a French film
- Delicious (2025 film), a German film

== Music ==
- Delicious Vinyl, an American record label

=== Albums ===
- Delicious (Dreams Come True album), 1995
- Delicious (Jeanette album), 2001
- Delicious, by the Boyz, 2023
- Delicious, by Gacharic Spin, 2013
- Delicious, by Shampoo, 1995
- Delicious, by Thunderbugs, 2000
- Delicious!: The Best of Hitomi Shimatani, by Hitomi Shimatani, 2003

=== EPs ===
- Delicious, by Borgore, 2011
- Delicious, by Woo Jin-young, or the title song, 2022

=== Songs ===
- "Delicious" (song), by Sleeper, 1994
- "Delicious", by Ayesha Erotica from Fresh Meat, 2017
- "Delicious", by Catherine Wheel from Adam and Eve, 1997
- "Delicious", by Charli XCX featuring Tommy Cash from Pop 2, 2017
- "Delicious", by the Duprees, 1975
- "Delicious", by Jim Backus, 1958
- "Delicious", by Linda Perhacs from Parallelograms, 1970
- "Delicious", by New Edition from New Edition, 1984
- "Delicious", by Nick Jonas from Spaceman, 2021
- "Delicious", by A Perfect Circle from Eat the Elephant, 2018
- "Delicious", by Shampoo from We Are Shampoo, 1994

== Other uses ==
- Delicious!, a 1996 manga by Yui
- Vicious and Delicious, a professional wrestling tag-team (1996-1998)
- Delicious Orie (born 1997), British boxer
- Delicious (website) (formerly styled del.icio.us), a linklog service (2003-2017)
- Delicious (novel), a 2008 historical romance by Sherry Thomas
- Delicious (TV series), a 2016 British TV series starring Dawn French

== See also ==
- Flavor (disambiguation)
- Deliciousness (TV series)
- Delicieux, a 2021 French film; see filmographer Nicolas Boukhrief
