= A Study in Scarlet (disambiguation) =

A Study in Scarlet is an 1887 detective mystery novel by Arthur Conan Doyle, featuring the debut of Sherlock Holmes.

A Study in Scarlet may also refer to:

- A Study in Scarlet (1914 British film), a silent drama film directed by George Pearson, now considered lost
- A Study in Scarlet (1914 American film), a silent film directed by Francis Ford
- A Study in Scarlet (1933 film), starring Reginald Owen as Sherlock Holmes
- "A Study in Scarlet", a 1968 episode of the TV series Sherlock Holmes (1964-1968), starring Peter Cushing

== See also ==
- A Study in Scarlet Women, a 2016 mystery novel by Sherry Thomas, the first entry in the "Lady Sherlock series", in which Sherlock Holmes is actually a public persona created by a woman detective named Charlotte Holmes
