= Shimatani =

Shimatani (written: 島谷 or 嶋谷) is a Japanese surname. Notable people with the surname include:

- Hitomi Shimatani (島谷 ひとみ) (born 1980), Japanese singer
- Seishiro Shimatani (嶋谷 征四郎) (1938–2001), Japanese footballer
