= Natsuki Okamoto (actress, born 1989) =

Japanese model and actress (born 1989)

- 岡本 奈月
- Born: September 13, 1989 (age 36); Mie Prefecture, Japan
- Occupations: model; actress
- Years active: 2002–2011
- Height: 155 cm (5 ft 1 in)

Natsuki Okamoto (岡本 奈月, Okamoto Natsuki; born September 13, 1989) is a retired Japanese fashion model and actress. She was born in the Mie prefecture. Her career began as a model for the magazine CANDy in 2002. She was also the face model for Miyako Kajiro, a video game character from the 2004 video game Siren.

== Filmography ==
1. Warau Mikaeru (2006)
2. Aoi uta - Nodo jiman Seishun hen (2006)
3. K-tai Investigator 7 (2008)
4. Bakamono (ばかもの) (2010)
5. A Sky Too Far to See (見えないほどの遠くの空を, Mienai hodo no sora wo) (2011)
