= Sherry Thomas =

American writer (born 1975)

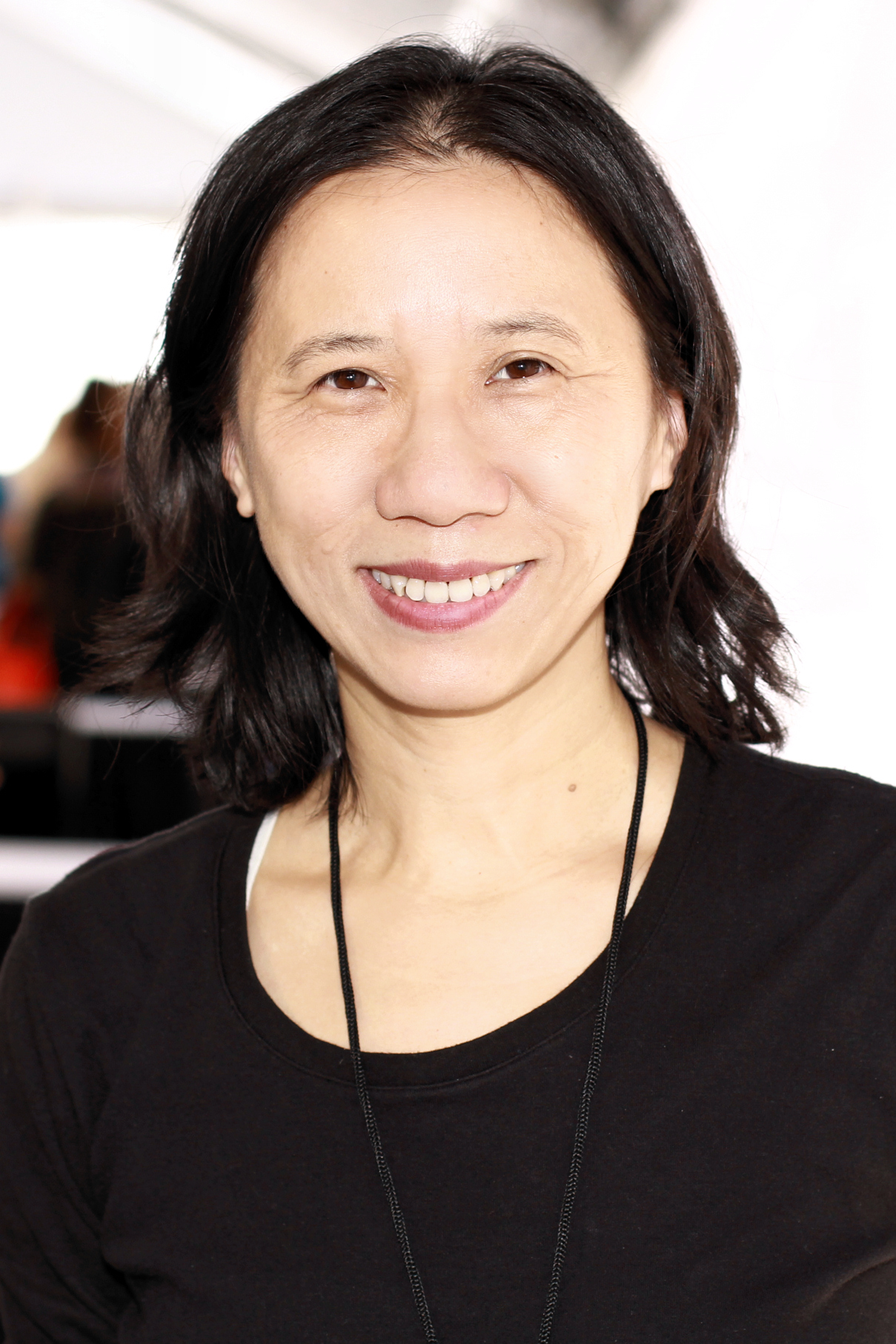
- Thomas at the 2019 Texas Book Festival
- Born: 1975 (age 50–51); Qingdao, Shandong, China
- Education: Louisiana State University, University of Texas at Austin
- Occupation: Writer
- Writing career
- Period: 2008–present
- Genres: Young adult fantasy, Historical romance, Contemporary romance
- Notable awards: RITA award – Best Historical Romance; 2010 Not Quite a Husband; RITA award – Best Historical Romance; 2011 His at Night
- Website: sherrythomas.com

Sherry M. Thomas (born 1975) is an American novelist of young adult fantasy, historical romance, and contemporary romance. She has won multiple awards including the Romance Writers of America RITA Award for Best Historical Romance for Not Quite a Husband in 2010 and His at Night in 2011.

In an article in The New York Times, romance author Sarah MacLean stated Thomas is known for her "lush style," and in USA Today romance author Madeline Hunter said she is "critically acclaimed as one of historical romance's best writers."

A native of China, Thomas emigrated to the United States at thirteen and learned English reading romance novels. She published her first novel in 2008, English-set Victorian romances, and in 2013, she branched into young adult fantasy. In 2014, she diverged from her traditional historical settings to publish a series set in Imperial China. Common themes in her work include unrequited love, love betrayal, and fate.

== Biography ==
=== Early life ===
Qingdao highlighted in red, with Shandong province in orange

Thomas was born in 1975 in Qingdao, Shandong, China. Thomas recalls that her grandmother did the crossword puzzles in China's official English-language newspaper. In 1984, Thomas's mother went to the United States to study, financed by Thomas's paternal great aunt. Thomas remained in China until her grandmother died in 1988, and she emigrated to the United States at the age of thirteen. Her mother was in graduate school at Louisiana State University.

Thomas improved her English by reading science fiction and romance novels, including those by Rosemary Rogers. Thomas reportedly read Rogers' novel Sweet Savage Love using a Chinese-English dictionary. Thomas found English-language romance books interesting due to their departure from Chinese cultural understandings of courtship. "I was quite surprised later to discover that the hero and the heroine in a romance weren’t required to hate each other for 600 pages running."

She received her BS in economics from Louisiana State University and earned her master's degree in accounting at University of Texas at Austin.

=== Personal life ===
She lives in Austin, Texas with her husband and sons.

== Writing career ==
Thomas stated that when she sold her first novel to Bantam in the summer of 2006, she had written five failed manuscripts in seven years. One of those was "Heart of Blade", which she later revamped into The Hidden Blade and My Beautiful Enemy. But in 2006, her first story to sell was "Schemes of Love" which was retitled as Private Arrangements. It took her ten months to write, and she found representation with Kristin Nelson with the Nelson Literary Agency. Nelson sold it in a preempt to Bantam twenty-five days after receiving the query from Thomas.

Though scheduled for a Fall 2007 release, Private Arrangements was published March 25, 2008. Publishers Weekly's starred review called it "steamy and smart" and they named it the Best Book of 2008 as well as Best First Historical Romance of 2008. Romantic Times called it a "dazzling debut".

She followed with the release of Delicious that summer. Romantic Times made it a Top Pick and said it placed "her among the very finest of the next generation of authors." She published Not Quite a Husband in May 2009, which won the Romance Writers of America RITA Award for Best Historical Romance in 2010, her first RITA. Reviews were generally favorable, and Romantic Times named it as one of the Innovative Historical Romance nominees for 2009 and noted the "musical quality" of its prose.

In May 2010, His at Night was released. While it won the RITA Award, it received mixed reviews. USA Today praised it for its flawed heroine, whereas Publishers Weekly thought aspects felt contrived but that "when hero and heroine actually connect, the humorous, graceful writing transcends a creaky plot." Romantic Times named it a Top Pick with 4 1/2 stars.

Up until then, she had been releasing stand-alone historical romances with Bantam, but in 2012, she moved to Berkley, who launched her first series, the Fitzhugh trilogy. All three books were released in the same year, Beguiling the Beauty, Ravishing the Heiress, and Tempting the Bride. The latter earned the Romantic Times October Seal of Excellence. Thomas supplemented the trilogy with digital releases. Two were through her agency, The Bride of Larkspear (2012) and A Dance in Moonlight (2013), and the third self-published, Claiming the Duchess (2014).

Berkley published another stand-alone release, The Luckiest Lady in London in November 2013. The New York Times said "The Chinese-born Thomas is known for a lush style that demonstrates her love of her second language, and this novel edges into historical fiction with its transporting prose even as it delivers on heat and emotion and a well-earned happily ever after". It also received a starred review from Kirkus Reviews, who named it one of the best romances of 2013, and USA Today felt it was "one of her strongest". Library Journal named it one of the top 10 romances of 2013, calling it "deeply insightful and exquisitely crafted."

In the fall of 2013, Thomas branched into writing young adult fantasy books, and Publishers Weekly said of The Burning Sky: "As expected, Thomas’s romantic touch is sure, but she is just as adept with fantasy world-building, carrying the banners of Anne McCaffrey and Caroline Stevermer, among others, in a wonderfully satisfying magical saga".

Kirkus Reviews said The Burning Sky "bids fair to be the next big epic fantasy success", but said of The Perilous Sea:

Themes of identity and memory, destiny and choice tie together the two stories, told in alternating chapters with ubiquitous cliffhangers. When the storylines finally intersect, the resolution is so abrupt as to be almost anticlimactic; but the dramatic, defiant conclusion will stoke anticipation for the next volume. With all the strengths and failings alike of the first book, only ever-so-much more so, this aims directly at its fans and will not likely pick up new ones.

USA Today felt that The Burning Sky was first and foremost a romance – "the steam, the chemistry and the passion are at the center" – with the fantasy secondary, and for that reason would be enjoyed best by romance fans, not hard-core fantasy fans. Young adult author Jodi Meadows named the main couple in this series as her top three favorite couples in a young adult book.

The release of The Hidden Blade and My Beautiful Enemy in the summer of 2014 marked a departure from her traditionally-set historical romances with these set in imperial China. In an interview on Kirkus, she revealed that she had written My Beautiful Enemy before she was published, intending it to be a series spanning twenty years. "That story stayed under my bed. Like most everything I wrote back then, the core idea was sound, but the execution was a hot mess," she said in an interview in USAToday. In 2013, she revised it into "a more intense romance. However, it was always intended to be an English version of a Chinese wuxia novel, with a heroic female spin."

It received mixed reviews, with NPR calling it "a bold new direction for Thomas, yet maintains the emotional intensity she is celebrated for". Kirkus Reviews felt the villain was its main weakness, but that its complex characters was its strength and called it "[a] thought-provoking exploration of gender roles in the East and West and in the historical romance genre. It's also a darn good read".

Library Journal named it one of the Top 10 romances of 2014, calling it, "a spellbinding, lyrically composed romantic adventure. Flashbacks to Chinese Turkestan add an exotic, mesmerizing touch". In its original starred review, it said

With incisive character development, deft pacing, and lyrical, nearly poetic prose, Thomas transports readers between remote, breathtaking Chinese Turkestan and teeming late Victorian London. A gripping, mesmerizing romance that is one of Thomas’s most unforgettable yet.

2015 marked another departure with her self-published release in April of a contemporary romance, The One in My Heart.

=== Thomas's views on writing ===
"I write complex situations with no pat solutions because they are what interest me as a reader: hard choices and what people do in the face of such hard choices. I am a seat-of-the-pants writer, so I’m always uncertain how I’ll bring it together. In the end, the characters themselves must have the strength and maturity to choose the right path."
- Sherry Thomas

Thomas once discussed the challenges of writing in an historical setting other than Regency England:

If I just said the Northwest Frontier of British India or Chinese Turkestan, most people would be drawing a blank. What kind of terrain are we dealing with? What kind of climate? What kind of people would the [hero and heroine] come across? So yes, more work is necessary to world-build, but only so that my readers would be able to visualize and understand the setting.

As far as her writing habits, she revealed that she is not the type who writes every day, and enjoys taking days off when she can. For The Hidden Blade she was on a tight deadline and only slept for two hours a day, several days in a row, so afterward in an interview she said, "not writing for at least a week or so seems like heaven!"

On the appeal of romance, she said it might be attributable to not just the "emotionally fulfilling reading experience" but also the escape to a different time and place. With historical romances particularly, she said, "I will also posit that since marriage was so final and divorce so difficult — and women's lives so much more restricted — the stakes around a romance were higher in Ye Olde Times."

"Some of the most illuminating and profoundly moving moments I’ve lived through have come from reading romances. Because learning to love another person is one of the most deep-reaching, surprising, and sublime of human experiences. And because the genre boasts some of the best writers working today."
- Sherry Thomas

While Rogers's novels acted as her gateway to the romance genre, it was reading Laura Kinsale and Judith Ivory that convinced her to set her historical romances in England:

I fell in love with the turn-of-the-century setting ... I adore that it was a time of tremendous advances in scientific understanding and technological capability—in Private Arrangements, for example, there is an automobile—and yet people still lived under a formality that is exotic and almost incomprehensible to us here in 21st-century America. That formality sets off a wonderful tension for a writer to explore the sexual charge in a look, a word, a hand held a fraction too long.

When it comes to world building for historical romances, she points to several elements that can assist the writer with effectively setting the reader in another time: showing practices and habits we frown upon today; practices we find acceptable today that they frowned upon; showing the similarities; using the correct forms of address; and, showing the cost of living. But she cautions that above all, the story must work or the reader will not care about the details. She studies how authors like Laura Kinsale, Courtney Milan, Judith Ivory, Ariana Franklin, and Laurie R. King integrate historical world-building into their narratives.

Thomas has described herself as being drawn to reading and writing about characters who have more going on beneath the surface than is first apparent—what she calls the "I-didn't-know-that-about-you moment".

=== Writing style ===
" 'My brother gave up the love of his life to marry an heiress. His wife, I suspect, has been in unrequited love with him all along. And my sister, God help us all, loves a married man. Compared to them, my loneliness seems terribly tame, something to be borne cheerfully.' She drew little circles on his arm—or were those hearts? 'What of you? Have you ever been lonely? Or have you been too self-sufficient to notice?' "
– The Duke of Lexington in Beguiling the Beauty referring to characters that would feature in Ravishing the Heiress and Tempting the Bride respectively

Thomas's writing is often described as lyrical, lush, musical, graceful, rich, evocative, with unique metaphors and turns of phrase. Author Kiersten Hallie Krum asserted that Thomas, along with Joanna Bourne and Meredith Duran, make up the forefront of a new wave in historical romance fiction strong in lyrical prose.

Her elegant turn of phrase lifts the storytelling to new heights. Her novels are a lexicon of delight. Her unique word choice is that one step to the left that eschews the boring in favor of the unexpected; "unsighted" rather than the mere "blind" or "a high castle wall of a smile," wholly original and yet instantly recognizable. The cadence of her sentences seduce a reader as surely as any romantic hero until you want to lay down on the nearest flat surface and simply succumb as her prose takes you, Calagon-like, away.

She also writes heroines who are deeply flawed as well as being unconventional, and will also break some of romance's rules. For instance, in Private Arrangements the hero and hero are estranged and take on other lovers.

Criticisms of her novels typically center on weak or contrived plot points, not on her prose.

=== Writing themes ===
"Perhaps unrequited love was like a specter in the house, a presence that brushed at the edge of senses, a heat in the dark, a shadow under the sun."
― Sherry Thomas, Ravishing the Heiress

One common theme that runs through many of her novels is of a couple whose love has been betrayed somehow in the past, and the novel starts years after that estrangement or betrayal. The events of the novel force them to recognize past faults and rekindle their love. Unrequited love has been a factor Tempting the Bride, Beguiling the Beauty, Not Quite a Husband, and Ravishing the Heiress.

Luckiest Lady in London contains strong themes of how women in Victorian England are under immense pressure to meet high ideals that can have disastrous consequences. Some have noted that Thomas can craft a beautiful story using common themes, and in this book it was a poor girl marrying a wealthy man: "Thomas then adds great dialogue and human frailty, and creates entrancing stories that are completely addictive."

In The Elemental Trilogy, the books explore the concept of identity, fate, and free will.

== Bibliography ==
=== Historical Romance ===
==== The Fitzhughs ====
- 0.5 Claiming the Duchess. Self-published. April 2014. ISBN 9781631280054.
- 1 Beguiling the Beauty. Berkley Sensation. May 2012. ISBN 9780425246962.
- 2 Ravishing the Heiress. Berkley. July 2012. ISBN 9780425250877.
- 2.5 A Dance in Moonlight. NLA Digital, LLC. March 2013. ISBN 9781620510759.
- 3 Tempting the Bride. Berkley. October 2012. ISBN 9780425251027.
- 3.5 The Bride of Larkspear. NLA Digital, LLC. November 2012. ISBN 9781620510551.

==== Heart of Blade Duology ====
1. The Hidden Blade. Self-published. July 2014. ISBN 9781631280085.
2. My Beautiful Enemy. Berkley. August 2014. ISBN 9780425268896.

==== The London Trilogy ====
1. The Luckiest Lady in London. Berkley. November 2013. ISBN 9780425268889.
2. Private Arrangements. Bantam. March 2008. ISBN 9780440244318.
3. His at Night. Bantam. May 2010. ISBN 9780553592443.

==== The Marsdens ====
- Delicious. Bantam. August 2008. ISBN 9780440244325.
- Not Quite a Husband. Bantam. May 2009. ISBN 9780553592436.

==== The Lady Sherlock Series ====
1. A Study in Scarlet Women. Berkley. October 2016. ISBN 9780425281406.
2. A Conspiracy in Belgravia. Berkley. September 2017. ISBN 9780425281413.
3. The Hollow of Fear. Berkley. October 2018. ISBN 9780425281420.
4. The Art of Theft. Berkley. October 2019. ISBN 9780451492470.
5. Murder on Cold Street. Berkley. October 2020. ISBN 9780451492494.
6. Miss Moriarty, I Presume?. Berkley. November 2021. ISBN 9780593200599.
7. A Tempest At Sea. Berkley. March 2023. ISBN 9780593200605.
8. A Ruse of Shadows. Berkley. June 2024. ISBN 9780593640432.

=== Standalone Contemporary Romance ===
- The One in My Heart. Self-published. April 2015. ISBN 9781631280139.

=== Young Adult Fantasy ===
==== The Elemental Trilogy ====
1. The Burning Sky. Balzar + Bray. September 2013. ISBN 9780062207296.
2. The Perilous Sea. Balzar + Bray. September 2014. ISBN 9780062329387.
3. The Immortal Heights. Balzar + Bray. October 2015. ISBN 9780062207357.

== Awards and reception ==
"My keeper is Sherry Thomas' Delicious. This story sticks with me for the beauty of language, Sherry's unique insights into the human heart and, of course, all that decadent 'food porn'!"
— Mia Marlowe

"I used to dread starting a new Judith McNaught novel because I was confident it would rip my heart from my chest but was likewise knew the HEA denouement would be well worth the agony. Ditto Sherry’s novels. Yet this is not reinvention; rather, Sherry Thomas is writing old skool romances with new skool sensibilities in a marriage of no amount of convenience but one guaranteed to bring hours and hours of reading delight. Perversely, you’ll love and thank her for wrecking your heart."
- Kiersten Hallie Krum

- 2008: Romantic Times Reviewers Choice Award First Historical Romance for Private Arrangements
- 2008: Publishers Weekly Best Books of 2008 for Private Arrangements
- 2010: Romance Writers of America, RITA Award for Best Historical Romance for Not Quite a Husband
- 2011: Romance Writers of America, RITA Award for Best Historical Romance for His At Night
- 2012: Romantic Times Reviewers' Choice Award for Innovative Historical Romance for Tempting the Bride
- 2012: Library Journal Librarian's Best Romance Books of the Year for Tempting the Bride
- 2013: Library Journal Top 10 Romances of the year for The Luckiest Lady in London
- 2014: Library Journal Top 10 Romances of the year for My Beautiful Enemy

She has received starred reviews for several titles from Booklist, Kirkus, Publishers Weekly, and Library Journal and as of 2015, has finaled four times in RITA Award contest. Her books are often cited by other romance authors as their top favorites. Says Laura Griffin, "Sherry Thomas is one of my go-to historical romance authors because of her smart characters."
