= The Luckiest Lady in London =

Book by Sherry Thomas

- First edition cover
- Author: Sherry Thomas
- Language: English
- Genre: Historical romance
- Published: 2013 (Berkley)
- Publication place: United States
- Media type: Print
- Pages: 276
- ISBN: 9780425268889

The Luckiest Lady in London is a historical romance novel by Sherry Thomas.

== Literary reception ==
In Sarah MacLean's review for The New York Times, she says, "The Chinese-born Thomas is known for a lush style that demonstrates her love of her second language, and this novel edges into historical fiction with its transporting prose even as it delivers on heat and emotion and a well-earned happily ever after." Publishers Weekly said, "Thomas's characters are intelligent and multidimensional, and each scene is expertly crafted and rich in details. Readers will be immersed in the story from the very first page until the breathtaking conclusion."

Kirkus Reviews gave it a starred review and named it one of the best romances of 2013, saying, "Thomas delivers a masterpiece of attraction, seduction, mistrust and masks, beguiling readers with two people who are so perfect for each other, they can’t even trust their own emotions, since they both know how deceptive and dangerous the other can be. A beautifully written, exquisitely seductive, powerfully romantic gem of a romance."

Mandi Schreiner with USA Today felt it was one of her strongest, calling it a "...solid historical romance that I absolutely enjoyed." Library Journal named it one of the top 10 romances of 2013, calling it "deeply insightful and exquisitely crafted."

== Awards and recognition ==
- 2013: Library Journal Top 10 Romances of the year
- 2013: All About Romance Reader Award—Best Historical Romance Set in the U.K.
- 2013: All About Romance Reader Award—Best Love Scenes (in a Mainstream Romance)
- 2013: All About Romance Reader Award—Best Romance
- 2013: All About Romance Reader Award—Best Romance Couple (Winner - Tie)
- 2013: Booklist—Starred Review (*)
- 2013: Kirkus Reviews—Starred Review (*)
- 2013: Publishers Weekly—Starred Review (*)
- 2013: RT Book Reviews—Top Pick (*)
- 2014: Romance Writers of America RITA Award Finalist for Best Historical Romance
