= My Beautiful Enemy =

Book by Sherry Thomas

- First edition cover
- Author: Sherry Thomas
- Language: English
- Genre: Historical romance
- Published: 2014 (Berkley)
- Publication place: United States
- Media type: Print
- Pages: 304
- ISBN: 9780425268896

My Beautiful Enemy is a historical romance by Sherry Thomas set in imperial China. Thomas, in describing the novel said she "intended [it] to be an English version of a Chinese wuxia novel, with a heroic female spin."

== Literary reception ==
NPR called it "...a bold new direction for Thomas, yet maintains the emotional intensity she is celebrated for." Kirkus Reviews felt its villain was "a cartoonish and unconvincing opponent," but that "[i]ts strength is the complexity of its main characters. Catherine is graceful and feminine but also deadly with a blade or her bare hands....A thought-provoking exploration of gender roles in the East and West and in the historical romance genre. It’s also a darn good read."

Library Journal named it one of the Top 10 romances of 2014, calling it, "a spellbinding, lyrically composed romantic adventure. Flashbacks to Chinese Turkestan add an exotic, mesmerizing touch." In its original starred review, it said "With incisive character development, deft pacing, and lyrical, nearly poetic prose, Thomas transports readers between remote, breathtaking Chinese Turkestan and teeming late Victorian London. A gripping, mesmerizing romance that is one of Thomas’s most unforgettable yet."

== Awards ==
- 2014: All About Romance Reader Award—Best Historical Romance Not Set in the U.K.
- 2014: All About Romance Reader Award—Biggest Tearjerker
- 2014: All About Romance Reader Award—Most Kickass Heroine (Honorable Mention)
- 2014: Library Journal—Starred Review (*)
