= Wake You Up/Ame no Hi ni wa Ame no Naka o Kaze no Hi ni wa Kaze no Naka o/Marvelous =

Single by Hitomi Shimatani
- Released: June 25, 2008
- Recorded: 2008
- Genre: J-Pop
- Label: avex trax

Hitomi Shimatani singles chronology
"Nakitai Nara" (2007)	"Wake You Up/Ame no Hi ni wa Ame no Naka o Kaze no Hi ni wa Kaze no Naka o/Marvelous" (2008)	"Ame no Hi ni wa Ame no Naka o Kaze no Hi ni wa Kaze no Naka o" (2008)

Wake You Up/Ame no Hi ni wa Ame no Naka o Kaze no Hi ni wa Kaze no Naka o/Marvelous (雨の日には 雨の中を 風の日には 風の中を, in the rain when it's rainy, in the wind when it's windy), is twenty-eighth single released by J-Pop singer Hitomi Shimatani. Released on June 25, 2008, it is only available in a CD+DVD format. It was released the same day as an additional collaboration single with Mitsuo Aida, Ame no Hi ni wa Ame no Naka wo Kaze no Hi ni wa Kaze no Naka wo, whose title and track listing differ slightly from this single's (and exclude the tracks Marvelous and Wake You Up) and thus is considered a separate single.

Wake You Up had been announced as the theme song for the 2008 Japanese television drama series K-tai Investigator 7.

The DVD is known to contain the music videos for all three title tracks.

This information is subject to change at the moment.

== Known Tracks ==
1. Wake You Up
2. Ame no Hi ni wa Ame no Naka wo Kaze no Hi ni wa Kaze no Naka wo (雨の日には 雨の中を 風の日には 風の中を, In the Rain When It's Rainy, In the Wind When It's Windy)
3. Marvelous
