= Not Quite a Husband =

2009 novel by Sherry Thomas

- First edition cover
- Author: Sherry Thomas
- Language: English
- Genre: Historical romance
- Published: 2009 (Bantam)
- Publication place: United States
- Media type: Print
- Pages: 341
- ISBN: 9780553592436

Not Quite a Husband is a historical romance novel by Sherry Thomas. It won the Romance Writers of America RITA Award for Best Historical Romance in 2010.

== Plot ==
The novel starts the summer of 1897, three years after a married couple, Bryony Asquith and Leo Marsden, have been estranged. Dr. Asquith is required at her home in England, and her family has asked her husband to retrieve her at her clinic in the Rumbur valley of the Chitral District in what was then the northwest frontier of India.

In the course of their journey to return to England, they are caught up in a revolt against the British and seek refuge in the fort at Chakdarra and participate in defending the fort during the Siege of Malakand. During the course of their journey home, they reconcile the differences that had kept them apart.

== Literary reception ==
Not Quite a Husband won the Romance Writers of America RITA Award for Best Historical Romance in 2010. Romantic Times named it as one of the Innovative Historical Romance nominees for 2009. In a review, they said, "Thomas has quickly become a fan favorite thanks to her wonderful storytelling and her unique ability to get into her characters' minds and our hearts. Her prose has a musical quality that flows effortlessly and lures the reader into the beauty of her words as well as her story. Then add diverse plotlines, engaging characters, depth of emotion and a sweeping romance -- what more could you desire?

All About Romance said it "has everything I want from a romance... Delightful but flawed characters I love and can identify with, luscious prose, an interesting setting, and a romance that touches my heart. I can't recommend it enough."

A reviewer at Dear Author likened her first three novels to Laura Kinsale, with this one having "echoes of the best of Mary Balogh, as well – not just in the ability to evoke emotion with slightly sensationalistic plot points but in some sentimental family reunions towards the end". She went on to give it a rare A citing its gorgeous prose, though she did feel it lacked the sophistication of Thomas's first two books. However, Jane Litte at the same site gave it B− and while noting its rich, evocative prose, she felt the motivation behind the reconciliation was lacking, as was any admission by the heroine of her own culpability.
