= Private Arrangements =

- First edition cover
- Author: Sherry Thomas
- Language: English
- Genre: Historical romance
- Published: 2008 (Bantam)
- Publication place: United States
- Media type: Print
- Pages: 368
- ISBN: 9780440244318

Private Arrangements is a historical romance novel written by Sherry Thomas. It was published in 2008 by Bantam Books.

== Critical reception ==
Private Arrangements received the Romantic Times Reviewers' Choice Award - Best Historical in 2008.

The Historical Novel Society called Private Arrangements "a delightful story with a well-developed plot that is well balanced with the right amount of historical detail" and noted that its "characters are complex and the emotional conflict is believable."

== Awards ==
- Romantic Times Reviewers Choice Award - Best Historical
- Publishers Weekly Best Books of 2008
