= Doesn't Really Matter =

2000 single by Janet Jackson

Single by Janet Jackson

from the album Nutty Professor II: The Klumps Soundtrack and All for You
- Released: May 23, 2000
- Studio: Flyte Tyme, Edina, Minnesota
- Genre: Electropop; R&B; dance
- Length: 4:58 (original / soundtrack version); 4:18 (radio edit); 4:25 (album version)
- Label: Def Jam; Virgin
- Songwriters: Janet Jackson; James Harris III; Terry Lewis
- Producers: Jimmy Jam and Terry Lewis; Janet Jackson

Janet Jackson singles chronology
"Girlfriend/Boyfriend" (1999)	"Doesn't Really Matter" (2000)	"All for You" (2001)

Music video
- "Doesn't Really Matter" on YouTube

"Doesn't Really Matter" is a song by American singer-songwriter Janet Jackson from the soundtrack to the 2000 film Nutty Professor II: The Klumps and her seventh studio album, All for You (2001). It was written and produced by Jackson, Jimmy Jam and Terry Lewis. The track was sent to contemporary hit radio in the US on May 23, 2000, after an unmastered version was leaked to several radio stations. It is an upbeat electropop, R&B and dance song with a syncopated drum loop and bassline. Based on a previously discarded poem Jackson wrote, the lyrics are about her film character's love for the Nutty Professor in spite of his insecurities.

Unlike its accompanying film, the track received generally positive reviews from music critics, who praised its upbeat sound and Jackson's breathy voice. "Doesn't Really Matter" topped the Billboard Hot 100 for three consecutive weeks, becoming the singer's ninth US chart-topper. It was Jackson's 19th single to be certified gold by the Recording Industry Association of America (RIAA), making her only the third singer, after Madonna and Whitney Houston, to achieve this feat. The song peaked at number five on the UK Singles Chart, becoming Jackson's 15th single to reach the top 10 in the UK. It also peaked within the top 10 in Canada, Denmark, Poland, Italy, and Spain.

The Joseph Kahn-directed music video resembles an abstract, futuristic environment based on Japanese culture. It features an AIBO, a prototype of the Acura CL-X, morphing clothes, and a dance sequence on a tilting platform. Production of the video cost over $2.5 million (equivalent to $4.7 million in 2025), making it one of the most expensive music videos of all time. To promote the single, Jackson performed it on British television program Top of the Pops and at the 2000 MTV Video Music Awards. The song was also performed during four of the singer's concert tours, and her 2019 Las Vegas residency, Janet Jackson: Metamorphosis.

== Background and development ==
"Doesn't Really Matter" was written and produced by Janet Jackson, Jimmy Jam and Terry Lewis as the theme for the Universal Pictures film Nutty Professor II: The Klumps, starring Jackson and actor Eddie Murphy. When asked to contribute a single for the movie's soundtrack, Jackson stated that she would consider if she found an appropriate song. The single would allow Jackson to continue releasing music, while simultaneously devoting time to her film career. To help inspire Jackson, director Peter Segal brought a rough cut of the film to Flyte Tyme Studios where the singer was recording her seventh album, All for You. She decided to write an uptempo love song rather than a ballad, inspired by Segal finding her love for Murphy's unattractive character in the film convincing.

The lyrics of "Doesn't Really Matter" were based on a poem Jackson found which she previously wrote and disposed of. The poem's lyrics were kept intact, although its structure was altered. Jackson wrote further lyrics for the song during the same night Jam came up with the melody alongside drum programmer Alex Richburg. After an early version of the song was created, Jackson requested Jam and Richburg to add more instrumentation, however Jam decided to record from live to tape after Richburg left the studio. Initially conceived as a "slow melody", Jam chose to increase its tempo.

Two different choruses were written by Jam and Jackson; Jam wrote "Nutty, nutty, nutty, my love for you" while Jackson wrote "Doesn't really matter". They decided to use Jackson's chorus, and include Jam's chorus towards the end of the track. Jackson presented three songs to Segal on May 12, 2000, three days prior to his set deadline for the soundtrack. He chose "Doesn't Really Matter", believing it was a better fit and a "summertime record". A slightly modified version was included on All for You, featuring an alternate introduction and elements from the song's "hard, twitchy" Rockwilder remix.

== Composition ==
"Doesn't Really Matter"
The chorus is played at nearly twice the speed as the start-stop verses. Most of the song was played live to tape, while a small portion was sequenced to double the melody.

"Doesn't Really Matter" is an electropop, R&B, and dance song. Although making using of funk production, common in R&B music at the time of its 2000 release, the track was viewed as an R&B-pop take on lounge music. Its upbeat pop sound is akin to Jackson's 1995 single "Runaway", a stark contrast to the sparse R&B of her previous 1997 album, The Velvet Rope. Music critic Jim Farber compared the retro-style melody in "Doesn't Really Matter" to compositions by Burt Bacharach. The production makes use of sparse, programmed percussion.

The majority of the track was played live to tape, even though it sounded sequenced. Jam recalled that only a small portion was sequenced, which was used to double the melody. The song utilizes both a syncopated drum loop and a bassline, which passes the circle of fifths to reach the V chord. The bassline allows space for the snare drum to be heard on the second and fourth beats, as well as accentuating the snare before the fourth beat is played.

The song begins with a 20-second mid-tempo introduction performed by Jackson in breathy voice. Jackson performs a falsetto trill on the lyrics "My love / For you / Is unconditional too". The chorus has nearly twice the speed of the stop-start verses. A more fluid breakdown features halfway, offsetting the pace and high-energy dynamic of the chorus. The song also utilizes a key change. According to Jackson, the lyrics for "Doesn't Really Matter" are about her film character's love for The Nutty Professor and refers to "how it doesn't matter what is on the exterior, but the interior".

== Critical reception ==
"Doesn't Really Matter" received generally positive reviews from music critics. Chuck Eddy of The Village Voice regarded it as Jackson's best single since 1990's "Black Cat", stating that "the melody's subliminal Asianness makes the nothingness of her piddly voice pretty—fragile like rice paper". In the New York Daily News, Jim Farber viewed the track as innovative, noting that it "dodges current clichés" and has "the yearning freshness of a summer breeze". According to him, "the baby's-breath tune and lightly skittish beat provide the perfect accompaniment for Jackson's coo of a voice". Carol Cooper of Sonicnet wrote that Jackson's vocals "deserve special mention for the deft way she speed-sings verses and choruses so as to accent their underlying rhythmic patterns".

In his review of the single for AllMusic, Jose F. Promis called it "impossibly catchy". Melissa Marschheuser of The Orlando Sentinel wrote that the song has "a beat you just can't help but hum along to". Matt Diehl of Entertainment Weekly viewed the track as "effervescent", and cited it and R. Kelly's "Just a Touch" as the only two consequential R&B songs on the soundtrack. In his review of All for You for Entertainment Weekly, Tom Sinclair regarded the song as "competent hack pop". Sean Piccoli of the Sun-Sentinel believed it had "a less suffocating shade of pop" than other tracks on All for You.

Neumu's Anthony Carew found the song "surgically clean" and the production "suitably slick", noting that Jam and Lewis were "so self-conscious of their skills they cut-in the word 'edit' as a cute cut-up gimmick". Chuck Taylor of Billboard called the song "frothy" and "a leftover from another time", but argued that it was "innocent fun" and "a smile-bearing throwback" that highlighted Jackson's "still-youthful vocal musings". Dotmusic's Gary Crossing was more critical, calling it a "disappointing fare" with a "bland" vocal mix, writing that "apart from the key changes there's barely anything of interest here". Writing in a 2022 retrospective review for Stereogum, Tom Breihan criticized the song's excessive production for its continuous "changing tones and tempos", but complimented Jackson's vocals and "rhythmic intelligence" for following the beat. Billboard included "Doesn't Really Matter" in its list of The Greatest Songs of 2000 at number 78. The Guardian placed it at number eight in its 2015 list of Jackson's best songs.

== Commercial performance ==
"Doesn't Really Matter" received early attention a week ahead of its US radio release on May 23, 2000, after an unmastered version leaked to several radio stations, some of whom made their own radio edits from the leak. It became the most added song on pop, rhythmic, and urban radio formats upon release. On the US Billboard Hot 100 issue dated June 17, 2000, "Doesn't Really Matter" debuted at number 59 on airplay alone. Following its CD and cassette single release on August 8, 2000, "Doesn't Really Matter" climbed to number one, selling 96,000 copies during its first full week of sales. The song spent three consecutive weeks at number one before being replaced by "Music" by Madonna. The single peaked at number one on the Hot 100 from the week ending August 26, 2000 to September 9, 2000. The single dropped off the Hot 100 on December 2, 2000, after being on the chart for 25 weeks. It was Jackson's ninth US number-one single and made her the first singer to achieve a number one in the 1980s, 1990s, and 2000s in the US.

The track peaked at number two on the Rhythmic Top 40, number three on the Hot R&B/Hip-Hop Singles & Tracks and Mainstream Top 40 charts, and number nine on the Maxi-Singles Sales chart. It also registered a 75-1 climb on the Hot Singles Sales chart, after debuting before its physical release because of street-date violations. "Doesn't Really Matter" was certified gold by the Recording Industry Association of America (RIAA) on September 25, 2000, for selling 500,000 copies in the US. According to the RIAA, Jackson became the third female singer, after Madonna and Whitney Houston, to achieve 19 gold-selling singles. The song was the 13th best-selling single of 2000 in the US with sales of 600,000 copies (rounded off to the nearest 100,000).

In Canada, "Doesn't Really Matter" debuted at number 45 on the RPM 100 Hit Tracks chart dated July 3, 2000. On the October 2 issue, it peaked at number two. In Australia, the song bowed at number 28 on the ARIA Singles Chart. On the New Zealand Singles Chart, it peaked at number 27 and spent a total of six weeks on the chart. "Doesn't Really Matter" fared better on the UK Singles Chart where it debuted at number five, making it Jackson's 15th single to reach the top 10 in the UK. The song was present on the chart for 11 weeks and was certified silver by the British Phonographic Industry (BPI) for selling 200,000 copies. In Europe, "Doesn't Really Matter" charted in the top 10 in Denmark, Italy, Poland and Spain. It also reached the top 20 in Belgium (Wallonia), the Netherlands, Norway, Sweden, and Switzerland. In Japan, "Doesn't Really Matter" received a Japan Gold Disc Award from the Recording Industry Association of Japan (RIAJ) for Top Selling Song of the Year by a foreign artist.

== Music video ==
=== Background ===
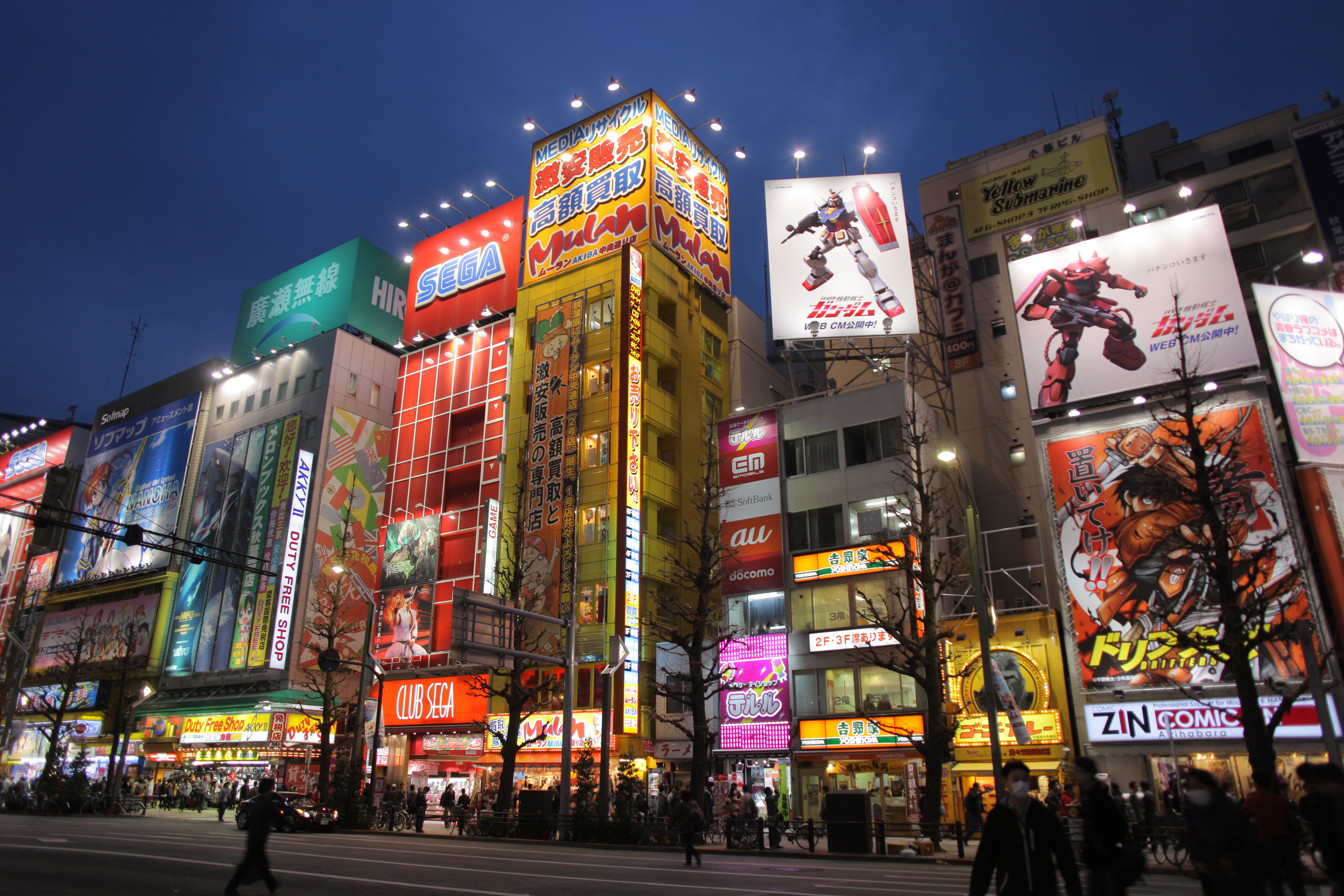
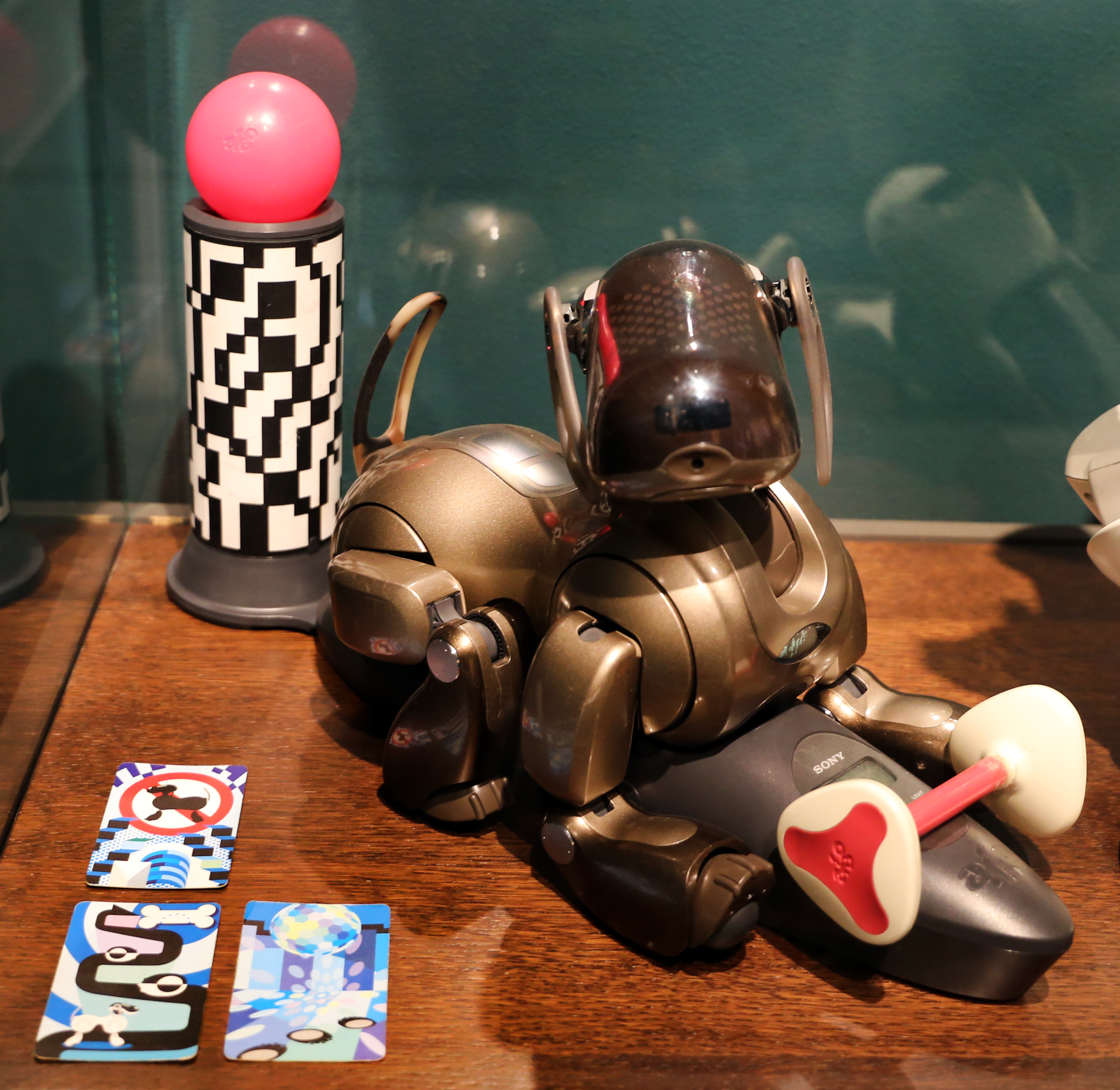
The music video for "Doesn't Really Matter" is inspired by several elements from Japan, such as the video's futuristic setting, and the AIBO that is seen near Jackson.

The music video for "Doesn't Really Matter" was directed by Joseph Kahn, with the setting portraying a futuristic city inspired by Tokyo. It showcases Jackson in an abstract anime-based environment, featuring an AIBO, which was the very first consumer Artificial Intelligence robot and was created for the companionship of adults and elderly people. Morphing clothes, levitating platforms, and a futuristic Acura vehicle, the Acura CL-X Concept Prototype, are featured in the video. The music video was filmed in Universal City, California on June 4–8, and premiered on MTV's Making the Video on June 28, 2000. Production costs were over $2.5 million (equivalent to $4.7 million in 2025), making it one of the most expensive music videos of all time.

Kahn described the video's premise as "epic minimalism" in an attempt to differentiate from the large sets of other music videos airing during the same time. He wanted to use minimal sets that would appear larger. Jackson contacted Kahn to direct the music video, explaining that she wanted to experiment with make-up and costuming in order to take risks. One of the dancers, Jenna Dewan, received the role in the music video at the age of 19 as the only spot the choreographers were looking for in an audition. All the dancers performed choreography on a moving platform while harnessed on bungee cords. The platform was implemented to tilt and slant, which would cause Jackson and the dancers to slide and fall off. The original scene was designed on a set, but was taken apart and replaced with a green screen.

The music video was one of the first appearances by Dewan, who stated "I was fortunate enough to work with Janet who treats her dancers amazing". Following the video shoot, Jackson asked Dewan to appear in the music video for her 2001 single "All for You", and be a dancer on her two-year All for You Tour.

=== Synopsis ===
The video opens with a postcard, featuring the song's title and Jackson's name, drifting on a sidewalk and being stepped on by pedestrians. It then pans from a panoramic nighttime city view to a scene of Jackson singing from her bed in a confined apartment. During this scene, the AIBO and various objects in her room are shown, including a television displaying Nutty Professor II: The Klumps, and a pair of moon shoes. Jackson then grabs a beverage from her fridge and starts singing in front of a mirror containing visually animated animal stickers. Four of her friends knock at her door and Jackson leaves with them. They dance through the apartment block hallway as their shoes morph into black futuristic high-heels, walking into an area filled with display screens and a circular platform.

During the song's breakdown, they perform a choreographed dance routine on the tilting platform. The scenes are intercut with Jackson drawing an orange swirl and the AIBO watching the film in her apartment. Various people are also seen drawing orange swirls. In the next segment, Jackson is shown in the passenger seat of a car driving through a tunnel, as scenes from Nutty Professor II: The Klumps appear as a reflection in the front window. The video concludes with a slow motion shot of Jackson falling backwards onto her bed and the AIBO resting in front of her.

=== Reception ===
Writing for DVD Movie Guide, Colin Jacobson praised the music video for deviating from the standard "lip-synch/film snippet formula" used among pop videos at the time, stating that it "stands on its own". Rod Stafford Hagwood of the Sun-Sentinel included "Doesn't Really Matter" among several videos which set fashion trends and increased the popularity of "bright colorful clothes" among youth. Aaron Beierle of DVD Talk likened the video's setting to science fiction film The Fifth Element. Matthew Trammell of The New Yorker wrote that it is "one of the most forward-leaning music videos of its time". Breihan opined that the music video's "futuristic spectacle" from its expensive budget resembled anime and Blade Runner, but labeled it as "weirdly chintzy now". However, Luke Bather of Highsnobiety was critical of the music video, calling the CGI "primitive" and describing how it portrays a dystopian future where everyone feels "bizarrely happy" while only being able to watch The Nutty Professor on television.

== Live performances ==
Jackson performed "Doesn't Really Matter" on the August 4, 2000 episode of the British music chart television program Top of the Pops. She also performed the song at the 2000 MTV Video Music Awards on September 7, opening the show from a three-tiered aerial set with 10 backing dancers. Jackson wore a black leather outfit and her long hair obscured her face most of the tightly choreographed performance. Jeff Stark of Salon found the dance routine "elaborate". Vibe included the performance in its 2015 list of 10 Iconic Janet Jackson Performances.

The song was also performed during the encore of the All for You Tour. The renditions were viewed as more intimate in contrast to the spectacle of earlier performances. "Doesn't Really Matter" was also performed during Jackson's 2008 Rock Witchu Tour, her first concert tour in six years. She insisted on the tour being "dance-heavy" after fans left messages on Jackson's phone-in number, which was used by Jackson to directly communicate with them. During Jackson's 2011 Number Ones, Up Close and Personal tour, the song was performed in a medley with "Escapade", "Love Will Never Do (Without You)", "When I Think of You" and "All for You". The music video appeared on screen before the start of the concert. The song was also included in the set lists for the second leg of Jackson's 2018 State of the World Tour, and her 2019 Las Vegas residency, Janet Jackson: Metamorphosis.

== Cover versions and remix ==
Japanese singer Hitomi Shimatani covered the song under the title "Papillon" for her 2001 debut album of the same name. Jackson initially prevented Shimatani's label Avex Trax from shipping the CD because the lyrics differed from Jackson's image of the song. She finally allowed the CD's release after a month's negotiation, stating that she appreciated seeing a new aspect of "Doesn't Really Matter" arranged in an Asian style. The song's katakana lyrics include oriental themes such as lotus flowers, gods, beliefs, dreams, and smiles. The single was released on February 7, 2001, and peaked at number 14 on Japan's Oricon Singles Chart, where it charted for 23 weeks. An eastern butterfly version was later issued on the song's maxi release on June 27, 2001.

Puerto Rican flautist Néstor Torres recorded a jazz version of "Doesn't Really Matter" for his seventh album, This Side of Paradise, released on March 13, 2001.

A remix of "Doesn't Really Matter" by Jackson and Japanese boy band Be:First was recorded in April 2026, and released on June 12, 2026. The Be:First members recorded new vocals for the remix, while Jackson's original vocal track was retained. Both artists performed "Doesn't Really Matter (Remix)" together during Jackson's 2026 Japan concert tour at K-Arena Yokohama on June 14, 2026. The remix's music video was released on June 18, 2026, and contains footage of Jackson's first meeting with Be:First, alongside their subsequent performance together. "Doesn't Really Matter (Remix)" peaked at number 12 on the Billboard Japan Hot 100 chart dated June 24, 2026.

== Track listing ==
CD single

No.	Title	Length
1.	"Doesn't Really Matter" (Radio Edit)	4:18
2.	"Doesn't Really Matter" (Jonathan Peters Club Mix)	8:49

US 12-inch single

Side A
No.	Title	Length
1.	"Doesn't Really Matter" (Rockwilder Mix)	5:41
2.	"Doesn't Really Matter" (Jonathan Peters Club Mix)	8:49
3.	"Doesn't Really Matter" (Spensane Get Up Extended Mix)	6:30

Side B
No.	Title	Length
1.	"Doesn't Really Matter" (Rockwilder Instrumental)	4:59
2.	"Doesn't Really Matter" (Jonathan Peters Sound Factory Dub Mix)	6:34
3.	"Doesn't Really Matter" (Spensane Get Up Dub Mix)	4:32

US cassette single

Side A
No.	Title	Length
1.	"Doesn't Really Matter" (Album Version)	4:55
2.	"Doesn't Really Matter" (Dance All Day Extended Mix)	5:04

Side B
No.	Title	Length
1.	"Doesn't Really Matter" (Jonathan Peters Club Mix)	8:49
2.	"Doesn't Really Matter" (Spensane Get Up Extended Mix)	6:30

US maxi single

No.	Title	Length
1.	"Doesn't Really Matter" (Album Version)	4:55
2.	"Doesn't Really Matter" (Dance All Day Extended Mix)	5:04
3.	"Doesn't Really Matter" (Jonathan Peters Club Mix)	8:49
4.	"Doesn't Really Matter" (Spensane Get Up Extended Mix)	6:30

UK 12-inch single

Side A
No.	Title	Length
1.	"Doesn't Really Matter" (Radio Edit)	4:18
2.	"Doesn't Really Matter" (Rockwilder Mix)	5:41
3.	"Doesn't Really Matter" (Jonathan Peters Club Mix)	8:49

Side B
No.	Title	Length
1.	"Doesn't Really Matter" (Instrumental)	4:38
2.	"Doesn't Really Matter" (Spensane Get Up Extended Mix)	6:30
3.	"Doesn't Really Matter" (Jonathan Peters Sound Factory Dub)	6:34

UK cassette single

No.	Title	Length
1.	"Doesn't Really Matter" (Radio Edit)	4:18
2.	"Doesn't Really Matter" (Album Version)	4:55

UK maxi single

No.	Title	Length
1.	"Doesn't Really Matter" (Radio Edit)	4:18
2.	"Doesn't Really Matter" (Rockwilder Mix)	5:41
3.	"Doesn't Really Matter" (Jonathan Peters Club Mix)	8:49
4.	"Doesn't Really Matter" (Video)

== Charts ==
=== Weekly charts ===
Weekly chart performance for "Doesn't Really Matter"
Chart (2000)	Peak position
Australia (ARIA)	28
Belgium (Ultratop 50 Flanders)	28
Belgium (Ultratop 50 Wallonia)	13
Canada (Nielsen SoundScan)	6
Canada Top Singles (RPM)	2
Canada Adult Contemporary (RPM)	49
Canada Dance/Urban (RPM)	14
Denmark (IFPI)	9
Europe (European Hot 100 Singles)	15
France (SNEP)	40
Germany (GfK)	23
Iceland (Íslenski Listinn Topp 20)	25
Ireland (IRMA)	21
Italy (FIMI)	10
Japan (Oricon)	33
Netherlands (Dutch Top 40)	11
Netherlands (Single Top 100)	15
New Zealand (Recorded Music NZ)	27
Norway (VG-lista)	13
Poland (Polish Airplay Charts)	9
Poland Airplay (Music & Media)	2
Scottish Singles Sales (Official Charts)	13
Spain (Promusicae)	9
Sweden (Sverigetopplistan)	14
Switzerland (Schweizer Hitparade)	17
UK Singles (Official Charts)	5
UK Hip Hop/R&B (Official Charts)	2
US Billboard Hot 100	1
US Dance Singles Sales (Billboard)	9
US Hot R&B/Hip-Hop Songs (Billboard)	3
US Pop Airplay (Billboard)	3
US Rhythmic Airplay (Billboard)	2

Weekly chart performance for "Doesn't Really Matter (Remix)"
Chart (2026)	Peak position
Japan Digital Singles (Oricon)	2
Japan Hot 100 (Billboard)	12
Japan Hot Overseas (Billboard Japan)	1

=== Year-end charts ===
Year-end chart performance for "Doesn't Really Matter"
Chart (2000)	Position
Belgium (Ultratop 50 Wallonia)	63
Italy (Musica e dischi)	90
Netherlands (Dutch Top 40)	78
Netherlands (Single Top 100)	91
UK Singles (OCC)	126
US Billboard Hot 100	18
US Hot R&B/Hip-Hop Singles & Tracks (Billboard)	29
US Hot Soundtrack Singles (Billboard)	3
US Mainstream Top 40 (Billboard)	31
US Rhythmic Top 40 (Billboard)	18

== Certifications ==
Certifications and sales for "Doesn't Really Matter"
Region	Certification	Certified units/sales
France	—	26,969
United Kingdom (BPI)	Silver	200,000^{^}
United States (RIAA)	Gold	600,000
^{^} Shipments figures based on certification alone.

== Release history ==
Release dates and formats for "Doesn't Really Matter"
Region	Date	Format(s)	Label(s)	Ref.
United States	June 19, 2000	Urban contemporary radio	Def Jam; Virgin	
United States	June 20, 2000	Rhythmic contemporary radio; contemporary hit radio	Def Jam; Virgin	
Germany	August 4, 2000	Maxi single	Universal Music	
United Kingdom	August 7, 2000	Cassette single; maxi single	Mercury	
France	August 8, 2000	CD single	Barclay	
United States	August 8, 2000	Cassette single; maxi single	Def Jam; Virgin	
Japan	September 20, 2000	Maxi single	Universal Music	
United Kingdom	October 16, 2000	12-inch vinyl	Mercury	
