= His at Night =

2010 historical romance novel by Sherry Thomas

His At Night
- First edition cover
- Author: Sherry Thomas
- Language: English
- Genre: Historical romance
- Published: 2010 (Bantam)
- Publication place: United States
- Media type: Print
- Pages: 417
- ISBN: 9780553592443

His at Night is a historical romance by Sherry Thomas. It won the Romance Writers of America RITA Award for Best Historical Romance in 2011.

== Plot summary ==
The novel is set in Victorian England. Lord Vere, an agent of the crown, and his accomplices have managed to become house guests of a reclusive suspect while he is out of town. Their hostess is his niece, Elissande Edgerton. She sees his sudden arrival as means for her and her aunt to escape her tyrannical uncle by making him fall in love with her in the three days she has until her uncle's return. The problem is, Lord Vere is unforgivingly stupid. So she sets her sights on Lord Vere's brother, Freddie.

Lord Vere poses as one of society's most bumbling bachelors as his disguise. The need to play that role in front of the niece chafes at first, until he sees her as a conniving gold digger determined to entrap his brother in marriage. While trying to gather evidence on the uncle, he tries to foil the niece's plans, only to become entrapped himself.

Now married, Elissande has freed not only herself, but her sickly aunt, who is addicted to laudanum. But on the uncle's return, he demands the return of his wife or he'll maim her idiot of a husband. Meanwhile, Lord Vere has gathered evidence they need, but have also uncovered that he is a murderer and the uncle is arrested.

Not happy that he's been entrapped into marriage, Lord Vere drinks too much one night soon after their wedding and his disguise slips. Not remembering all that he'd said and done, he tries to act the idiot the next day, but Elissande isn't fooled. She confronts him, but he avoids the topic. She begins to play along in the day, knowing she had her reasons for acting a part and so can't fault him for his. While marrying him had been an accident, it had served her purposes, and she finds she's fallen in love with her new husband. He, however, rebuffs her declaration, saying he wants to get an annulment, for he can't yet forgive her for her deceit and also can't yet give up his illusion of what his perfect wife should be.

Elissande is devastated, and then discovers her aunt has been kidnapped by her uncle, who has escaped from prison. The uncle demands her appearance, alone, at a rail station in a countryside town. Lord Vere assures her he will arrive ahead of time and be there to help her. The uncle brings her to a deserted home and physically assaults her. Elissande and Lord Vere, however, have packed her reticule with a lead weight, and she uses it to defend herself, keeping him at bay until Lord Vere arrives. Before they can silence him with chloroform, the uncle reveals that Elissande is actually his daughter.

Elissande's beloved aunt, now much recuperated since she's finally free of her abusive husband, confirms that she is her mother, and that she'd switched her when Elissande's cousin had been in their care and died. It had been the mother/aunt's hope that the cousin's relatives would be returning to take guardianship of the cousin, and in that way Elissande would be able to escape the household. The uncle had later discovered his wife's deceit and this led to further abuse and restrictions, leading to the wife becoming a self-imposed invalid.

Lord Vere has finally seen what his own lies have done to himself and his relationship with his brother. It's revealed that he'd taken on the disguise on his sixteenth birthday shortly after his father had died, and Vere had overheard his father's deathbed confession of murdering his wife. Needing someone to talk to, he'd turned to a family friend, who expressed dismay and that she'd learned it from his brother Freddie. Vere had been not only angry at being denied revenge for his mother, but that Freddie had kept it from him. The family recognized that she could turn his thirst for justice and his intelligence into a use for the crown and recruits him. She also tells him he needs to come up with a persona that will allow him to move through society without being taken seriously. Not wanting to take on the guise of a debauched rake, he uses the opportunity of a riding accident to completely change his personality.

After confessing to his brother, Vere faces his wife, who is preparing to be alone. He tells her she'd allowed him to see that he'd let his pain and hurt diminish him, whereas she'd been strong and resourceful and whole in the face of hers. He's now seen that she's exactly the type of person he needs with him.

== Literary reception ==
While the book won the RITA, it was not universally praised.. Publishers Weekly said, "Though both story line and misunderstandings feel contrived at times, Thomas writes with genuine wit and sympathy, and when hero and heroine actually connect, the humorous, graceful writing transcends a creaky plot."

However, romance author Meredith Duran, in talking about the appeal of a flawed heroine, recommended this novel, saying it's a "love story that hinges on the dishonesties of both heroine and hero, this is a wonderful, passionate, twisty tale that proves virtue doesn't always pay off in love! Romantic Times named it a Top Pick with 4 1/2 stars, saying "Thomas doesn’t just enhance the genre, she enriches it with her intelligent characters, brilliant dialogue, innovative plot twists and amazing love stories. Reading her novel is a rare treat — an insight into the hearts and minds of all who dream.
