= Ame no Hi ni wa Ame no Naka o Kaze no Hi ni wa Kaze no Naka o =

Single by Hitomi Shimatani
- Released: June 25, 2008
- Recorded: 2008
- Genre: J-pop
- Label: avex trax

Hitomi Shimatani singles chronology
"Wake You Up" (2008)	"Ame no Hi ni wa Ame no Naka o Kaze no Hi ni wa Kaze no Naka o" (2008)	"Smiles" (2009)

"Ame no Hi ni wa Ame no Naka o Kaze no Hi ni wa Kaze no Naka o" (雨の日には 雨の中を 風の日には 風の中を, In the Rain When It's Rainy, In the Wind When It's Windy), is the twenty-eighth single and second collaboration single released by J-Pop singer Hitomi Shimatani. It is set to be released on June 25, 2008, and restricted to a CD-only format. It was released on the same day as a solo single from Hitomi, entitled Wake You Up/Ame no Hi ni wa Ame no Naka o Kaze no Hi ni wa Kaze no Naka o/Marvelous, which contains the tracks Wake You Up and Marvelous, which are not included on this single. However, it will not contain Amaoto, a b-side which will be included on this version of the single.

This single will also contain bonus rap and duet versions of the title track, and the jacket artwork is said to be based on the book, Ame no Hi ni Wa.

== Track listing ==
1. Ame no Hi ni wa Ame no Naka o Kaze no Hi ni wa Kaze no Naka o (雨の日には 雨の中を 風の日には 風の中を, In the Rain When It's Rainy, In the Wind When It's Windy)
2. Amaoto: Ame no Hi ni wa Ame no Naka wo Zenya (雨音~雨の日には雨の中を 前夜~)
3. Ame no Hi ni wa Ame no Naka o Kaze no Hi ni wa Kaze no Naka o (feat. Goof from Soffet)
4. Ame no Hi ni wa Ame no Naka o Kaze no Hi ni wa Kaze no Naka o (Instrumental)
5. Amaoto: Ame no Hi ni wa Ame no Naka wo Zenya (Instrumental)
