= Mikiya =

- Gender: Male

Origin
- Origin: Japanese
- Meaning: Different meanings depending on the kanji used

Mikiya (written: 幹也, 幹弥 or 三起也) is a masculine Japanese given name. Notable people with the name include:

- Mikiya Eto (衛藤 幹弥; born 1999), Japanese footballer
- Mikiya Katakura (片倉 三起也), Japanese composer and member of Ali Project
- Mikiya Yamada (山田 幹也; born 1992), Japanese footballer
