= Shanti (Hitomi Shimatani album) =

Second studio album from Japanese singer Hitomi Shimatani

Studio album by Hitomi Shimatani
- Released: June 12, 2002
- Recorded: 2002
- Genre: J-pop
- Label: avex trax

Hitomi Shimatani chronology
Papillon (2001)	Shanti (2002)	Poinsettia: Amairo Winter Memories (2003)

シャンティ (Shanti) is the second studio album from Japanese singer Hitomi Shimatani. It was released on June 12, 2002, and hit #1 on the Oricon charts. Since then, it was last recorded as having sold around 438,447 copies. Thus far, it is her highest-selling studio album, and her only one to top the Oricon weekly charts.

The album also contains "Amairo no kami no otome" (亜麻色の髪の乙女), Shimatani's highest-selling single to date with 375,000 copies sold.

== Track listing ==
1. Introduction
2. Shanti
3. Amairo no Kami no Otome, The Girl with the Flaxen Hair)
4. Glorious Day
5. Interlude
6. A.S.A.P.: As Soon As Possible
7. She Is...
8. Remember of You
9. Interlude
10. Yasashii Kiss no Mitsukekata (Yasashii Kiss no Mitsukekata, How to Find an Affectionate Kiss)
11. Freeze: 失われた夏の日 (ushiruwaneta natsu no hi, The Summer Day We Lost)
12. Hello!
13. Beloved
14. Yasashii Kiss no Mitsukekata
15. Colors
16. 亜麻色の髪の乙女: Hiro Kuretani Remix
17. Single Hits Non-stop Mega Mix: Trans Mission Mega Mix (First Press Bonus Track)
