= Papillon (Hitomi Shimatani album) =

Studio album by Hitomi Shimatani
- Released: June 27, 2001
- Recorded: 2001
- Genre: J-Pop
- Label: avex trax

Hitomi Shimatani chronology
Papillon (2001)	Shanti (2002)

Papillon is the first studio album from Japanese singer Hitomi Shimatani. It was released on June 27, 2001, and hit #7 on the Oricon Albums Chart. Since then, it was last recorded as having sold around 147,030 copies.

The title track is a Japanese-language cover of "Doesn't Really Matter", a hit single by American singer Janet Jackson.

== Track listing ==
1. パピヨン:Papillon (Papiyon)
2. Fantasista
3. 市場に行こう (Ichiba ni Ikou, Let's Go to the Market)
4. Last Shooting Star
5. His rhythm
6. 解放区 (album version) (Kaihouku, Free Zone)
7. Motto...
8. Splash
9. Sugary
10. Thanksful
11. 絶対温度 (Zettai Ondo, Absolute Temperature)
12. Thinking of You
13. パピヨン: Papillon (Eastern Butterfly) (Bonus Track)
