= Delicious (novel) =

2008 romance novel by Sherry Thomas

- First edition cover
- Author: Sherry Thomas
- Language: English
- Genre: Historical romance
- Published: 2008 (Bantam)
- Publication place: United States
- Media type: Print
- Pages: 432
- ISBN: 9780440244325

Delicious is a 2008 historical romance novel by Chinese-born American author Sherry Thomas. Set in late Victorian England, it follows chef Verity Durant and barrister-turned-politician Stuart Somerset as their past connection resurfaces after a decade.

== Plot summary ==
Set in England, the novel alternates between the story's present in 1892 and flashbacks to 1882.

Verity Durant is a fallen woman who works as a chef for a former lover. However, she still dreams of the man she spent one perfect night with ten years ago, rising politician Stuart Somerset.

When her employer dies, the new heir is none other than Somerset. Somerset is the strait-laced illegitimate son of a noble and has become engaged to a woman with good connections.

Fate intervenes, and she has a chance to cook a dinner for him.

== Literary reception ==
"My keeper is Sherry Thomas' Delicious. This story sticks with me for the beauty of language, Sherry's unique insights into the human heart and, of course, all that decadent 'food porn'!"
— Mia Marlowe

Her sophomore novel garnered a coveted A rating at Dear Author and was named a Top Pick by Romantic Times Book Review, in which they said it was a "delicious, delectable and a mouth-watering blend of Cinderella, Top Chef and Like Water for Chocolate, not to mention Chocolat. She dazzles with her intelligent, compelling story and memorable characters. This well-crafted romance places her among the very finest of the next generation of authors."

Chicago Tribune said "Sherry Thomas neatly blends subtly nuanced characters, a stylishly detailed late Victorian setting, and a sublime, fairy-tale inspired romance into an irresistible literary treat."

However, another critic said the "secondary romance is as charmingly rendered as that of the main characters, and the author thoroughly understands the universal appeal of both descriptions of fine cuisine and romantic scenes. Well executed and entertaining, if long for the story it has to tell, Delicious is only slightly marred by an overuse of metaphor.

A reviewer with All About Romance enjoyed the metaphors and the well crafted prose but felt the plot suffered from authorial intrusion at times and that there was too much going on. She concluded with "Though Delicious had a number of high points, I did not fully enjoy it. The ending in particular left me frustrated and unable to completely recommend it. Readers who like love triangles, feminist, sexually experienced heroines, disguises, and strong sensuality might like it more than I did, however. None of these alone are turn-offs for me as a reader, but together they proved to be too much."

Dear Author found the ending refreshing due to the honest, adult behavior of the hero and heroine, whereas Sarah at Smart Bitches Trashy Books felt it was too fanciful, leaving her in doubt of their happy ending. This factor kept it from earning an A, in a book she otherwise enjoyed, saying "Thomas mixes a fairy tale, a social imbalance, and a knife-sharp grasp of language so well that I was in turns dizzy with the hope for a happy ending, thoughtfully mulling the social problems in that time period and how they reflect current times..."
