= Judith Ivory =

American novelist

Judy Cuevas
- Education: University of Florida; University of Cambridge
- Occupation: Novelist
- Writing career
- Pen name: Judith Ivory
- Period: 1988–present
- Genre: historical Romance
- Notable work: The Proposition
- Notable awards: RITA award – Short Historical Romance; 2000 The Proposition

Judith Ivory is the pen name of Judy Cuevas, a best-selling American author of historical romance novels. She is a winner of the Romance Writers of America's RITA Award.

== Biography ==
As a child, Judith Ivory liked to gather the other neighborhood children together and tell them stories. She carried a notebook with her and would often jot down poems, essays, and short stories. In her first semester at the University of Florida, Ivory's English professor invited her to join the invitational honors program based on writing ability and told her to consider a career as an author. While she enjoyed the honors program, Ivory decided that she needed a backup plan. She earned an undergraduate degree in applied mathematics and a master's degree in theoretical mathematics, and also completed post-graduate work in English at Cambridge University. She taught math at the junior high and high school level before accepting a position as a professor at the University of Miami.

She began her writing career in earnest when her children were toddlers. At first, she concentrated on non-fiction articles for parenting magazines. After finishing her first novel, Starlit Surrender, Ivory sent it to twelve publishing houses. It sold nine weeks later and was published in 1988 by Zebra. Ironically, the week the book was published she received a rejection letter for the same book from Pocket Books." Ivory switched publishing houses, to Berkley, for her second novel, Black Silk. Berkley had a backlog of novels by other writers and were unable to schedule her book very quickly, leading to a three-year gap between the novels. It took another four years before her third book, Bliss, was published. This time, the gap was due partially to personal event. In 1992, within a four-month span Ivory's children fell ill with collapsed lungs, her husband filed for divorce, and their home was hit by Hurricane Andrew. The children recovered, the house was rebuilt, and Ivory has gotten on with her life, but it caused a major delay in the completion of her book.

After her 1996 release Dance, Ivory left Berkley for a publishing deal with Avon. Avon requested that she change her name. Her previous books had been published under her real name, Judy Cuevas. They hoped that a new marketing campaign under a new name would enable her books to sell in larger quantities because bookstores did not have a preconceived notion of how many books she might be able to sell. Under Avon's guidance, Ivory has become much more successful, graduating to the super lead position (the second highest level) for their romance line by [1999].

Ivory has a large family, including her own brother and fifteen aunts and uncles. Her family is very supportive, to the point that her father has been known to buy all the copies of her latest book at a local bookstore and demand that the owner reorder. One of Ivory's aunts likes to attend her book signings and tell passersby that Ivory is the best writer alive.

Ivory is most productive when she devotes a continued amount of time to her work. She often works eight to ten hours a day, six days a week, with a more abbreviated schedule on Sundays. After completing a book, she takes a break, often choosing to travel. Unfortunately, since the mid-2000s back problems have prevented Ivory from completing her latest work in progress, a Victorian-set novel that is potentially the first in a series.

Ivory has a son and daughter, both of whom are now on their own. She lives in Miami, Florida.

== Reception ==
Year	Honor	Notes	Ref.
1997	Reviewers' Choice Award for Best Historical Novel, for Beast	Presented by the Romantic Times	
2000	RITA Award for Short Historical Romance, for The Proposition	Presented by the Romance Writers of America	

== Bibliography ==
=== As Judith Ivory ===
- Angel in a Red Dress (2006) [Reissue of Starlit Surrender]
- Untie My Heart (2002)
- Black Silk (2002)
- The Indiscretion (2001)
- The Proposition (1999)
- Sleeping Beauty (1998)
- Beast (1997)

=== As Judy Cuevas ===
- Dance (1996)
- Bliss (1995)
- Starlit Surrender (1988)

=== Non-fiction ===
- "On Writing, Art, Issues, and Publishing in Spite of it All" essay in North American Romance Writers (1999, ISBN 0810836041)
