= Nakitai Nara =

Single by Hitomi Shimatani
- Released: March 19, 2008
- Recorded: 2008
- Genre: J-Pop
- Length: 16:02
- Label: avex trax
- Producer(s): Nemoto Kaname

Hitomi Shimatani singles chronology
"'Shinku/Ai no Uta'" (2007)	"Nakitai Nara" (2008)	"'Wake You Up'" (2008)

Alternative cover
- CD + DVD

Nakitai Nara (If I Want to Cry) is the twenty-seventh single released by J-Pop singer Hitomi Shimatani. It peaked at #34 on the Oricon charts and sold around 3,754 copies. To date, it is currently her lowest-selling single.

== Track listing ==
1. Nakitai Nara (泣きたいなら, If I Want to Cry) (4:20)
2. Kuchizuke Shiyou (口づけしよう, Let's Kiss) (3:41)
3. Nakitai Nara (泣きたいなら, If I Want to Cry) (instrumental) (4:20)
4. Kuchizuke Shiyou (口づけしよう, Let's Kiss) (instrumental) (3:41)

DVD track list

1. Nakitai Nara (full drama version) (泣きたいなら)
2. Shimatani Hitomi interview
