= A Study in Scarlet Women =

2016 mystery by Sherry Thomas

- First edition
- Author: Sherry Thomas
- Genre: Mystery
- Published: October 2016 (Berkley Books)
- Publication place: United States
- Media type: Print
- Pages: 336
- ISBN: 978-0425281406

A Study in Scarlet Women is a mystery by Sherry Thomas. It is the first novel of Thomas' "Lady Sherlock series". In the novel, Thomas gender-flips Sherlock Holmes into Charlotte Holmes. Thomas said

"A Sherlock Holmes has the luxury of not thinking about such rules. After all, they don't interfere in his life...Charlotte Holmes has no choice but to deal with them—and how she deals with them would define the paths of her life."

Charlotte creates the fiction of a "Sherlock Holmes, consulting detective" and masquerades as his sister to solve crimes within the limited opportunities for women in Victorian England.

== Synopsis ==
=== Part One ===
Charlotte Holmes, the youngest daughter of the noble but impoverished Lord and Lady Holmes, possesses a razor-keen intellect and unique talents for observation and deductive reasoning, but her parents undervalue these gifts, declaring them off-putting to a potential husband. Before her first Season, Charlotte, declaring herself uninterested in marriage, strikes a bargain with her father: she will participate in the Season, but if she does not accept any potential suitors, her father will finance her education to become the headmistress of a girls' school (one of the few vocations in Victorian England which allows an unmarried woman a sufficient income). Her father agrees, but later reneges.

Charlotte decides that the "logical" alternative is to lose her maidenhead in secret and blackmail her father into paying for her education. If he does not support her, she will let everyone know and ruin the family. Unfortunately, the young man she chooses to seduce, Roger Shrewsbury, is an "idiot", who gets drunk and, mistaking his own wife for another one of his mistresses, tells her all about his planned assignation with Charlotte. Instead of preventing the rendezvous, Shrewsbury's wife and mother lie in wait and burst in on the two in flagrante, ensuring that Charlotte's disgrace is total. Rather than accept her parents' sentence of exile to the family's country estate, Charlotte leaves home for a London boarding house, to look for work as a secretary.

After several weeks without success, Charlotte meets a wealthy widow, Mrs. Joanna Watson, whose husband was an army doctor killed in Afghanistan. Mrs. Watson offers her a position as her paid companion.

Before her disgrace, Charlotte had created the pseudonym of "Sherlock Holmes" to pass tips about newsworthy crimes through her childhood friend, Lord Ingram Ashburton, to Ashburton's friend, Inspector Treadles of the Metropolitan Police. Now, Mrs. Watson suggests that she and Charlotte open "Sherlock's" consultations to the general public, with Charlotte playing the role of Sherlock's sister, ministering to her fictitious brother while he is bedridden with illness.

=== Part Two ===
When Lady Shrewsbury, Roger Shrewsbury's domineering mother, dies soon after a violent argument with Charlotte's older sister, Olivia, Charlotte becomes alarmed that "Livia" or her parents will be suspected in the death. "Sherlock Holmes" writes a letter to Scotland Yard, suggesting a connection between Lady Shrewsbury's death and the deaths, occurring within weeks of each other, of Lady Amelia Drummond and The Honourable Harrington Sackville. All three victims were connected by family or marriage ties, and all three appeared to have died from an accidental overdose of chloral hydrate.

Inspector Treadles, a firm believer in "Sherlock Holmes"' abilities, investigates Sackville's death more closely, but does not find any definite proof of foul play until a consultation with "Holmes", via Charlotte, leads him to discover that the local doctor's supply of strychnine – the most effective antidote for an overdose of chloral – was removed before the night of Mr. Sackville's death.

Charlotte's consultation business and Treadles's investigation overlap when she realizes that one of her clients, Mrs. Marbleton, who claims to be looking for her absent husband, is actually a woman named Sophia Lonsdale, who was disgraced by an affair with a married man (much the same way Charlotte herself was) and fled to Europe twenty years earlier. She has returned to England, and fabricated a case for "Sherlock Holmes" in order to discover more about "his" progress in the Sackville case.

Treadles eventually confronts Sackville's valet, Hodges, who admits to poisoning Sackville with arsenic, but with the intent of incapacitating, not killing, him. Hodges had learned that Sackville was a paedophile who frequented an illegal brothel in London offering underage girls. Hodges was trying to prevent Sackville from visiting the brothel until Hodges could discover its exact location and report it to the police.

Armed with this revelation, Charlotte solves the case: Sackville molested his niece, Clara, as a young girl, then discarded her after she reached adolescence. Clara killed herself at age 14, leaving behind a diary which her friend never read, but passed upon her own death to Ms. Lonsdale. Reading it, Ms. Lonsdale learned not only of Sackville's actions, but that Lady Shrewsbury and Amelia Drummond had discovered Sackville, but kept silent for their own selfish reasons. Ms. Lonsdale visited each of them and offered the same choice: public exposure, or suicide. All three chose the latter. Ms. Lonsdale has already left the country, but enough of the truth is revealed to clear the Holmes family of suspicion in Lady Shrewsbury's death.

Livia proposes that Charlotte write a fictionalized account of the case. Charlotte declines, but encourages Livia to do so.

== Reception ==
Sarah Wendell, reviewing the book for NPR, said "You'll probably finish it, and start the first page over again, because it's that good."

Constance Grady for Vox gave it two and a half stars saying "A Study in Scarlet Women has a killer premise, some interesting character work, and a regrettably poorly structured plot."

Book riot listed it as one of their "favorite under-the-radar-books" of the year. Kirkus Reviews called it one of the "Best Mysteries and Thrillers of 2016".

Kate Reading won an Earphone Award in 2016 for her performance of the audiobook version.
