= Hitomi Shimatani =

Japanese singer

Hitomi Shimatani 島谷 ひとみ
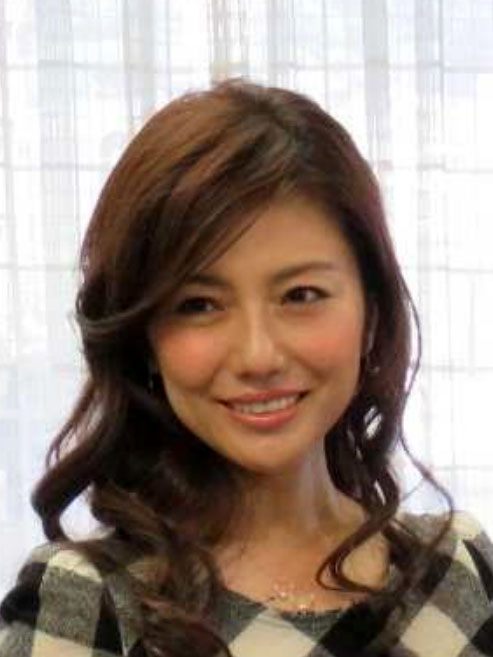
- Shimatani in 2015

Background information
- Born: Hitomi Shimatani (島谷 瞳); September 4, 1980 (age 45); Kure, Hiroshima, Japan
- Genres: J-pop; dance
- Occupation: singer
- Instrument: Vocals
- Years active: 1999–present
- Labels: Avex Trax (1999–2021); AI.R LAND/Daiki Sound (2021–present)
- Website: shimatani.tokyo

Hitomi Shimatani (島谷ひとみ, Shimatani Hitomi; born 4 September 1980) is a Japanese pop singer.

Formerly signed to the Avex Trax label for 22 years, Shimatani started her career as an Enka singer with the release of her debut single "Ōsaka no Onna" (大阪の女, Ōsakan Woman) in 1999, but later decided to get into the dance/pop style for her music. Shimatani's music has also appeared in several video games and television shows.

Shimatani is currently releasing music under her own label, AI.R LAND RECORD, under Daiki Sound.

== Biography ==
=== Early life ===
At the age of seventeen, while still in high school, Shimatani attended "The Japan Audition 1997", where she was chosen as the winner out of around 200,000 people and got a recording contract with the Avex label. After this she continued her studies in high school in Hiroshima, although she started to take vocal lessons in Tokyo during the weekends. She graduated from Shimizugaoka High School.

=== 1999–2002: Debut and mainstream success ===
Her first single, entitled "Ōsaka no Onna" which was an enka song, was released in 1999 on the Avex Trax label. The single went to the top of the Oricon's Enka charts and much critical acclaim, but failed to chart within the Top 40 of the mainstream charts, selling rather poorly. "Ōsaka no Onna" became then Shimatani's only enka single, as since her second one, "Kaihōku", she turned into more mainstream pop influences.

Mainstream success did not come until 2001 with the release of Shimatani's third single, "Papillon", a Japanese version of Janet Jackson's song "Doesn't Really Matter". The single became her first Top 15 single in the Oricon charts, and eventually stayed within the Top 50 for twenty weeks, selling over 200,000 copies. Her sixth single "Shanty", which was used as theme song of TBS' TV drama Pretty Girls, became her first Top 10 single in the Japanese charts, peaking at number seven. In May 2002 she released another cover, this time of "Amairo no Kami no Otome" by the 60's group sounds band Village Singers. The song became a massive success, peaking at number 4 and leading to a "boom of covers" in Japan. It also became one of the most preferred songs to be sung in karaokes by Japanese people (it stayed at the top position of the Oricon Karaoke charts for 18 weeks, and it took the first position of its yearly charts). At the end of this successful year, Shimatani was invited for the first time to the most important Japanese TV show of New Year's Eve, the Kōhaku Uta Gassen on the NHK channel. From this time she would be invited to be in the show for another 3 years in a row.

In 2003 she debuted as an actress in the Fuji TV drama Boku dake no Madonna, where she was given one of the main roles, and also made a debut as voice actress in the animated movie Doraemon: Nobita in the Wan-Nyan Spacetime Odyssey. In 2004 she also participated in her first musical, A Star is Born, along with Yukie Nakama and Eriko Imai.

=== 2005–2007: Pop to classical crossover ===
In February 2005, Shimatani released her first concept album, Crossover, which marked a sustained shift her music, from mainstream J-pop to classical-influenced tunes. Since then her music has been heavily influenced by string instruments and pianos, instead of electric guitars, bass and keyboards, and also started to include some world ethnic elements. The first album released under this new style was Heart & Symphony, which featured four singles including "Garnet Moon" (theme song of PlayStation 2's Another Century's Episode) and "Falco" (theme song of Miss Earth & The Law Of Ueki). The album peaked at number 7 on the Oricon charts. The theme song for the Japanese version of Racing Stripes is "I Will" by her.

In 2006, Shimatani released three singles. The first one was the double A-side single "Haru Machibito/Camellia", released on March 15. Another double A-side single, entitled "Destiny: Taiyō no Hana/Koimizu: Tears of Love" was released on June 21. "Destiny: Taiyō no Hana" was used as opening theme for Black Jack 21. Finally, "Pasio" was released on November 15. The b-side of this single, "True Blue", was used as insert song for anime television series The Law of Ueki, was used as insert song for beauty pageant television series Miss Earth.. This year she also played the lead role of Anne Shirley during the touring performance of Anne of Green Gables in Japan, and starred in the live action film The Prince of Tennis as Sumire Ryuzaki.

On March 7, 2007, Shimatani released her 6th studio album, Prima Rosa, which peaked at number 16 on the Oricon charts. She also recorded a cover of High School Musical's "When There Was Me And You" (in Japanese entitled "Anata to Ita Toki"), which was included as part of the Disney film's Japanese soundtrack. On December 5, Shimatani released her first cover album, Otoko Uta: Cover Song Collection, on which she only recorded covers originally sung by male artists, such as Anzen Chitai, Begin and Masayoshi Yamazaki. For the album she also made a new crossover version of "Amairo no Kami no Otome", which she performed live at that year's Kōhaku.

=== 2008–present ===
In March 2008, Shimatani released the single "Nakitai Nara" in March 2008, which debuted at number 34 at the Japanese charts, being her lowest peaking song since "Yume Biyori" in 2003. In June she released the triple A-side single "Wake You Up/Ame no Naka ni wa, Ame no Naka wo, Kaze no Naka ni wa, Kaze no Naka wo/Marvelous". "Wake You Up" was used as the theme song of K-tai Investigator 7, which started airing in early April 2008; "Ame no Naka ni wa, Ame no Naka wo, Kaze no Naka ni wa, Kaze no Naka wo" was a song to pay tribute to poet Mitsuo Aida and was also released as a single by itself; "Marvelous" was used as theme song for Wrestling Asia Senshuken 2008 (the previous song used for this show was "Neva Eva", which was released back in 2007). The single debuted at number 33 on the Oricon charts. On July 16, Shimatani released her seventh studio album, Flare.

On March 4, 2009, she released her thirtieth single, "Smiles", which is being used as the theme song for the drama Parallel, in which Shimatani herself stars. In July she celebrated her tenth anniversary in music releasing the greatest hits album Best & Covers, and also holding a special live concert in the Itsukushima Shrine.

In 2011, Shimatani became part of the rock musical Rock of Ages, along with other musicians such as Takanori Nishikawa and Misono. On October 1, 2011, Hitomi started her own radio program called Eyes on Me in FM Yokohama.

== Discography ==
Studio albums

- Papillon (2001)
- Shanti (2002)
- Gate: Scena III (2003)
- Tsuioku + Love Letter (2004)
- Heart & Symphony (2005)
- Prima Rosa (2007)
- Flare (2008)
- Honjitsu, Tonai, Bōsho (2014)
- Misty (2018)
- LoveSong: My Song For You (2021)
- Liberty Bus (2025)
