= Janet Jackson videography =

Videos and media by American singer

Janet Jackson video discography
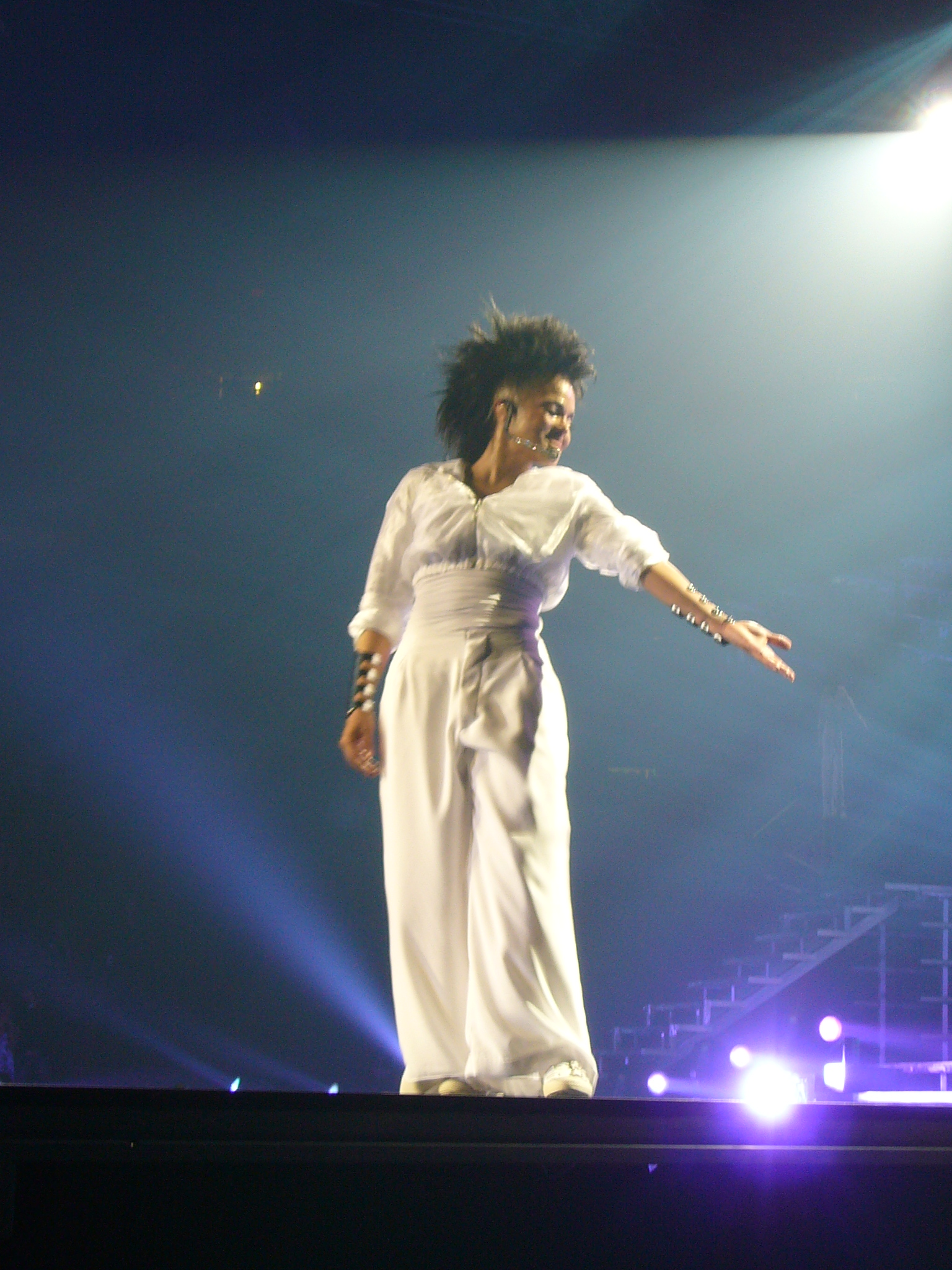
- Jackson performing on tour
- Video albums: 8
- Music videos: 52
- Concert tour videos: 2

American singer Janet Jackson has released fifty-two music videos, in addition to eight video albums and two concert tour videos. Upon the debut of Control, she became a dominant figure in entertainment, establishing herself as one of the pioneers of the video era. Her videography is considered among the most influential in popular culture by critics, who have lauded their elaborate sets, intricate dance routines, fashion, and meticulous detail. Her story-telling videos display various concepts, ranging from large production pieces to socially conscious themes and controversial depictions of intimacy. Throughout her work, Jackson was a preeminent influence in establishing the art of performance and choreography within music video. Her videos have been described as the entertainment industry's highest standard, which Rolling Stone observed to create templates for numerous artists. VH1 ranked her among the greatest women in music video, while MTV honored her with the Video Vanguard Award and inaugural Icon tribute for her impact within entertainment.

The video for Jackson's song "What Have You Done For Me Lately" catapulted her into "megastar status", while "Nasty" was declared "a feminist film theorist's programmatic deconstruction of the male gaze". "Control" depicted a stage performance, as she portrayed what would later become her signature moves. "Let's Wait Awhile" marked the directorial debut of Dominic Sena, whose collaborations with Jackson lead him to direct films starring Brad Pitt and Angelina Jolie. "Miss You Much" became notorious for its industrial setting and iconic chair routine, which Glenn Gamboa considered to have "changed the way radio sounded and MTV looked". "The Pleasure Principle" depicts a lengthy freestyle dance performance and chair sequence, which Entertainment Tonight observed to be "ripped off wholesale by pop acts ever since". Aspects of the video have been emulated by Robyn, Britney Spears, Lady Gaga, The Pussycat Dolls, Cassie, Ciara, Mya, Beyoncé, and Jennifer Lopez, inspiring her to
pursue a career in entertainment.

The Rhythm Nation 1814 film depicts militant choreography in an industrial warehouse setting. Rolling Stone declared it "the gold standard for dystopian dance-pop music videos", featuring "the most memorable choreography in pop video history". The publication also regarded it to "set the template for hundreds of videos to come". Entertainment Weekly considered it "legendary" and "groundbreaking", in addition to "striking, timeless and instantly recognizable". Aylin Zatar remarked, "She also basically pioneered the dancing in a warehouse, post-apocalyptic, industrial setting video. So, Britney (“Till the World Ends”), Rihanna (“Hard”), Lady Gaga (“Alejandro”), and even the Spice Girls (“Spice Up Your Life”) – you all have Ms. Jackson to thank." The film depicts several performances and drug abuse, won a Grammy Award for Best Long Form Music Video. The carnival theme and setting of "Escapade" was later recreated in Lady Gaga's "Judas". "Alright" revisits classic Hollywood musicals, with Jackson starring as the leading protagonist. It was thought to inspire Chris Brown's "Yeah 3x", Ne-Yo's "One in a Million", and Cheyenne Jackson's "Don't Wanna Know". It was also the first pop video to feature a guest rapper, setting the trend for later collaborations.

"Love Will Never Do (Without You)" unveiled Jackson's physique using classic lighting and imagery. It also explored the aesthetic of the male body from both the heterosexual female and gay male perspective. Its setting and theme influenced Britney Spears' "Don't Let Me Be the Last to Know", Jennifer Lopez's "First Love", and Nicole Scherzinger's "Your Love", and was also compared with Lopez's "I'm Into You". It was voted MTV's favorite female video in history during the next decade. "That's the Way Love Goes" used an intimate and "lo-fi" loft setting, later emulated by Nelly Furtado, 'N Sync, and Prince in "Breakfast Can Wait". It also introduced a then-unknown Jennifer Lopez. Jackson's "If" video became iconic for its modern club setting and complex dance routine, which Slant Magazine called among the greatest in history. Its portrayal of interracial lust and voyeurism had also been controversial, later inspiring Britney Spears' "I'm a Slave 4 U". It displayed technology such as touch screens and web cameras, which were not invented at the time. "You Want This" used a desert locale, as Jackson portrayed a female gang leader.

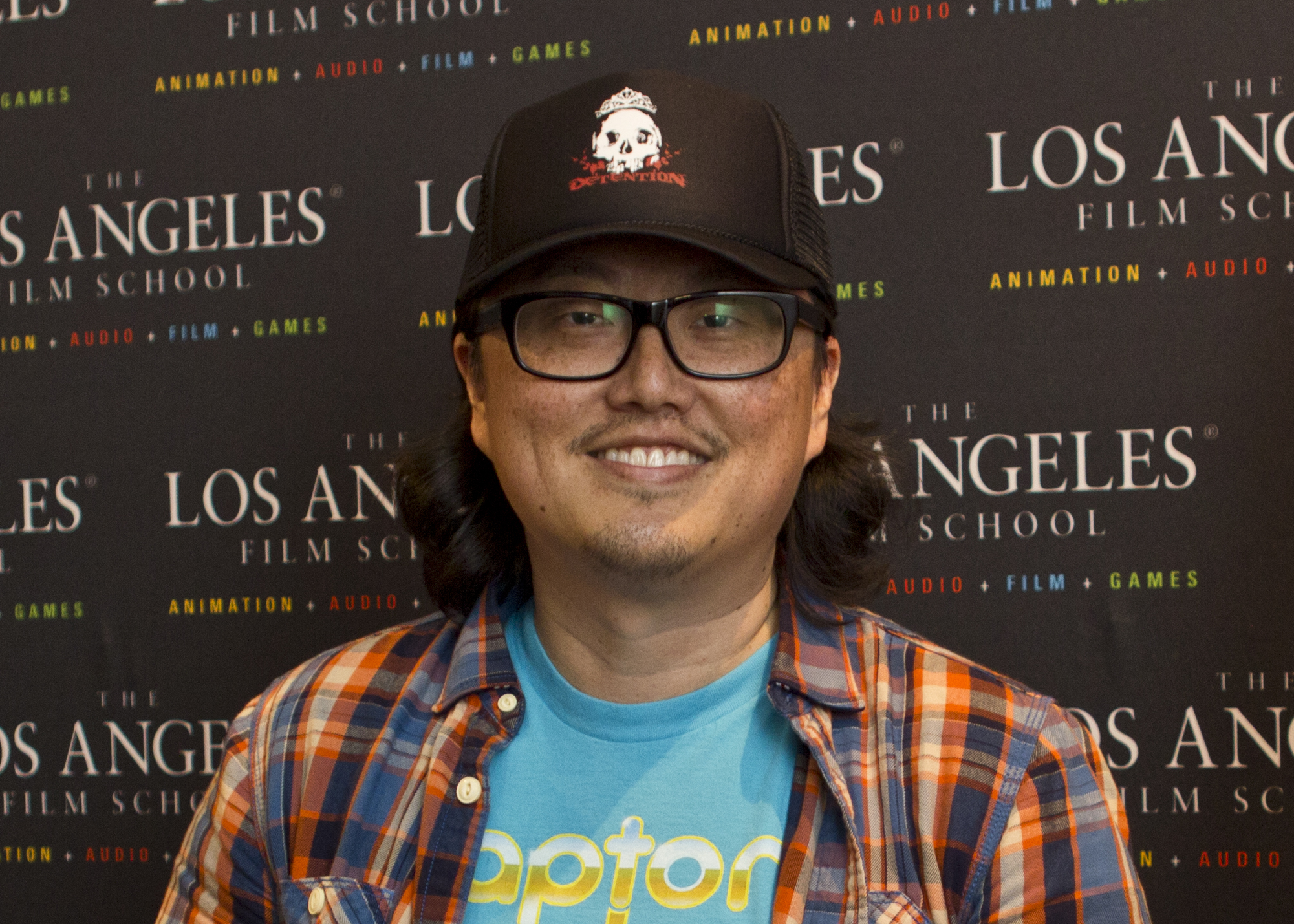
Joseph Kahn studied Jackson's music videos prior to becoming a director.

"Got 'til It's Gone" displayed a stark contrast from Jackson's mainstream image; portraying a pre-Apartheid celebration upon the freedom of slavery. It won a Grammy Award for "Best Short Form Music Video". "Together Again" incorporated a savanna atmosphere, tribal attire, and spiritual theme; inspiring Rihanna's "Where Have You Been". The premise of "Go Deep" depicts a teenage fan who dreams she arrives at his house for a party. "Every Time" gained controversy for nudity within its bath tub scenes, and was later compared with Britney Spears' "Everytime" and Rihanna's "Stay". "Doesn't Really Matter" became the first of director Joseph Kahn's videos to incorporate futuristic Japanese imagery; also being among the ten most expensive videos in history. Elements of its "high-tech" Japanese city, mobile architecture, and choreography would influence various artists, including videos from Britney Spears, Mariah Carey, and Jessica Simpson.

Jackson's attire in "All for You" was considered to inspire fashion trends, while Variety observed the imagery of "Someone to Call My Lover" to be influential. "Son of a Gun" displayed a "dark, brooding revenge tale" using voodoo and telekenesis, thought to inspire Justin Timberlake's "Cry Me a River". Jackson filmed herself on DVD in "Just a Little While"; its plot later applied via Skype in Kelela's "Melba's Call". "All Nite (Don't Stop)" took place in an abandoned warehouse during a power outage, using a car battery to restore electricity. "So Excited" became the first music video to use Panavision Genesis x-ray technology. The galactic theme and visuals of "Feedback" were observed to be incorporated in multiple videos, from artists including Namie Amuro, David Guetta, Misha B, and Robin Thicke.

== Music videos ==
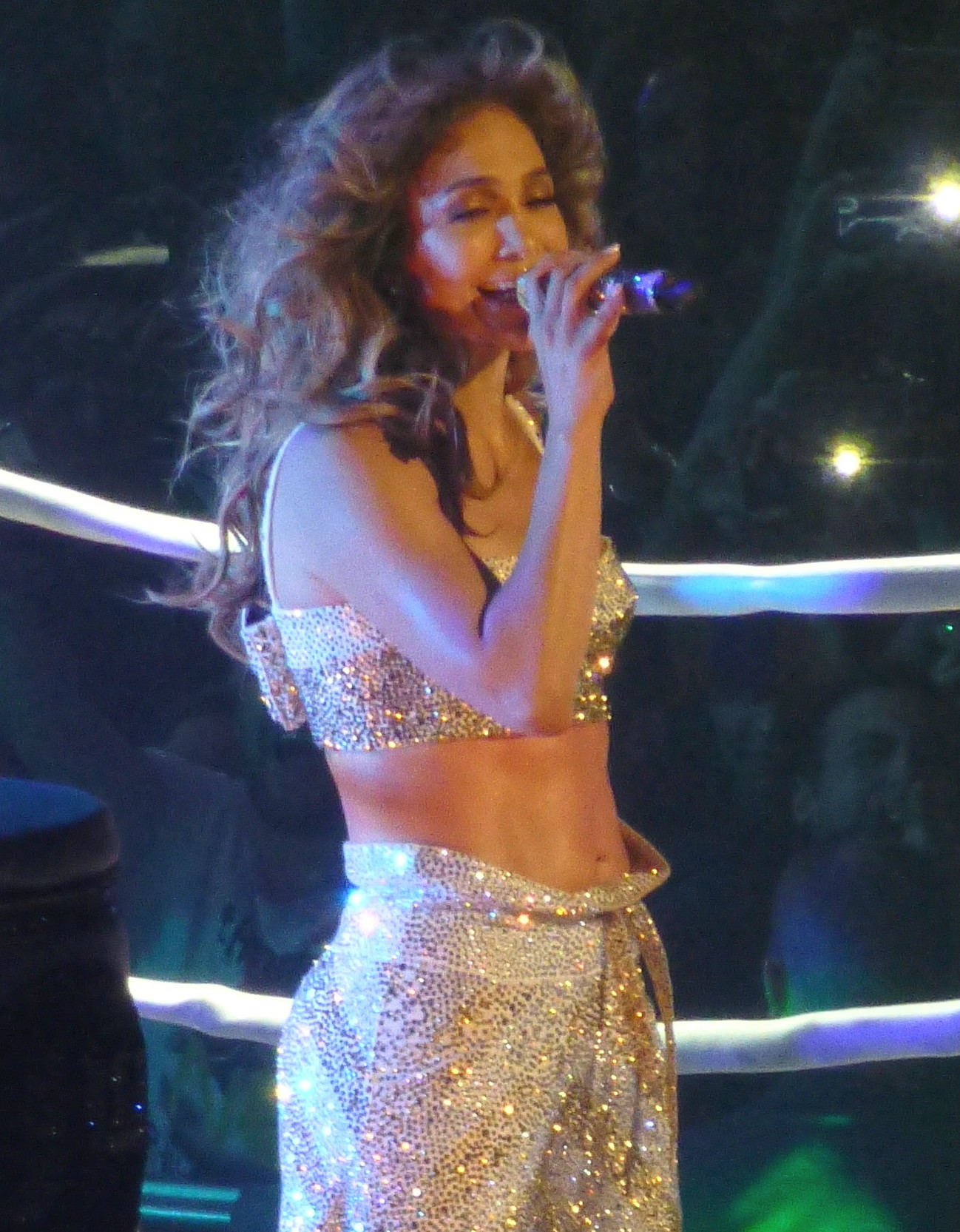
Jennifer Lopez (pictured) made her music video debut in Jackson's "That's the Way Love Goes" video.

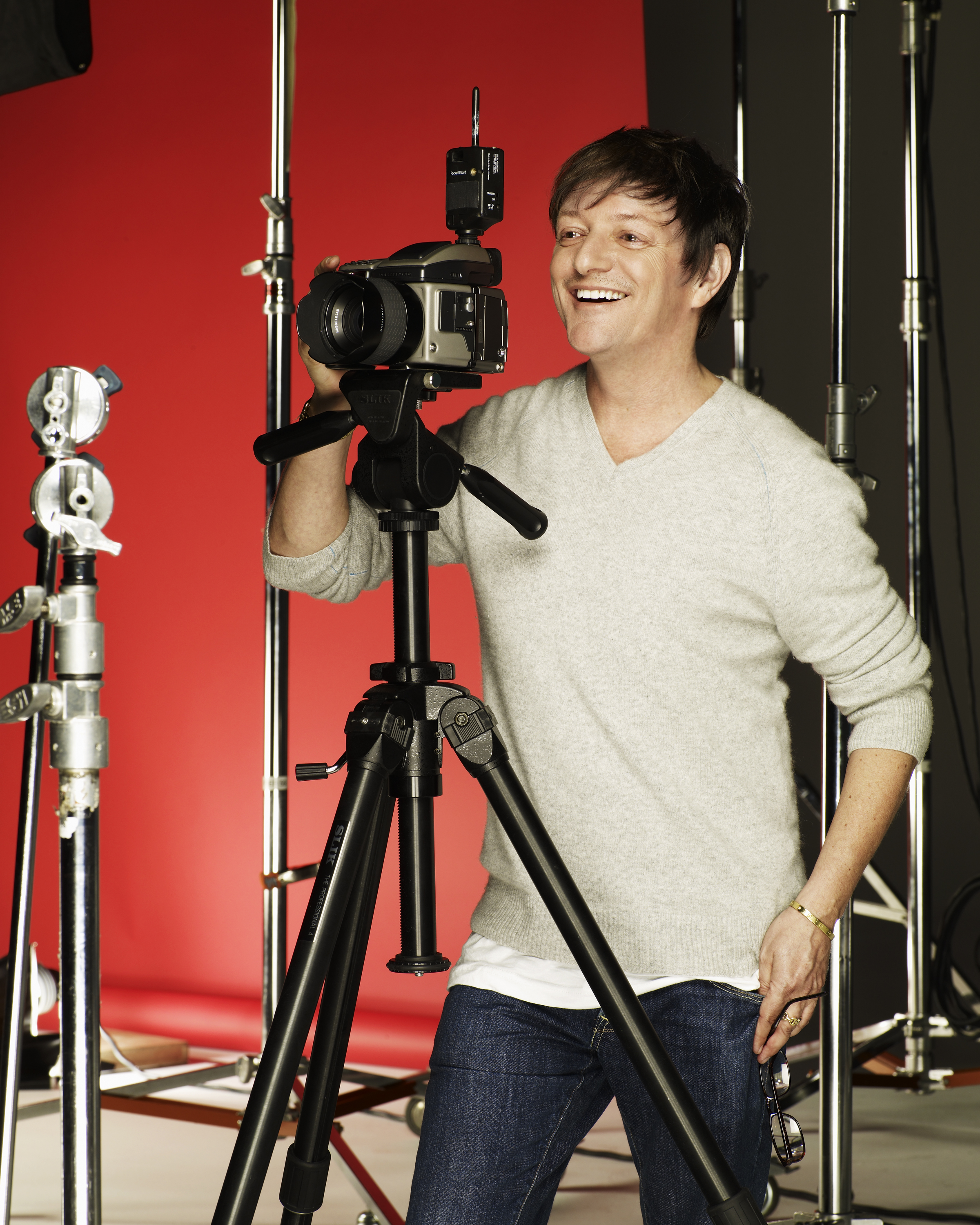
Jackson's clip for "Every Time" was directed by Matthew Rolston (pictured).

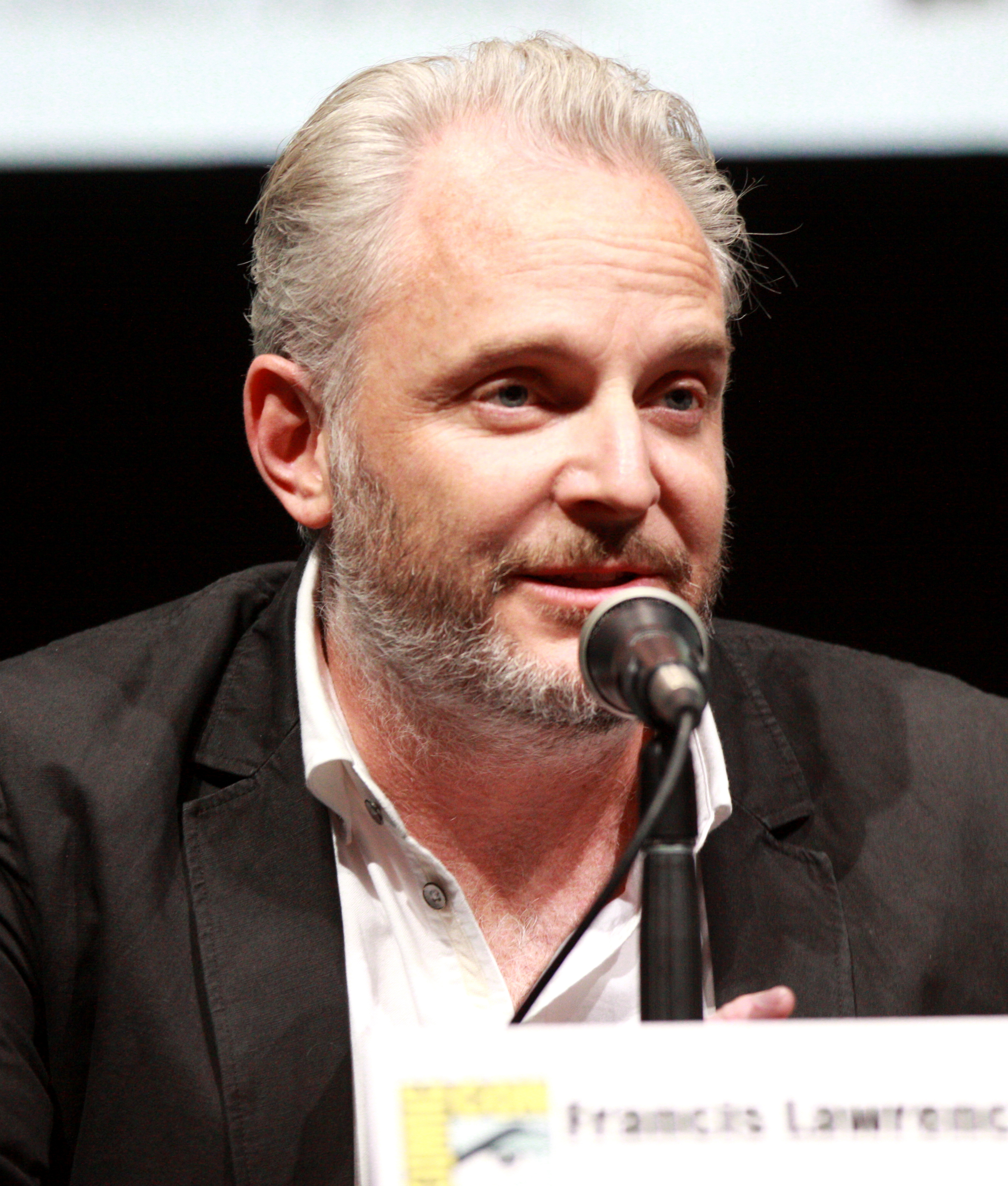
Francis Lawrence (pictured) directed several of Jackson's videos, including "All Nite (Don't Stop)".

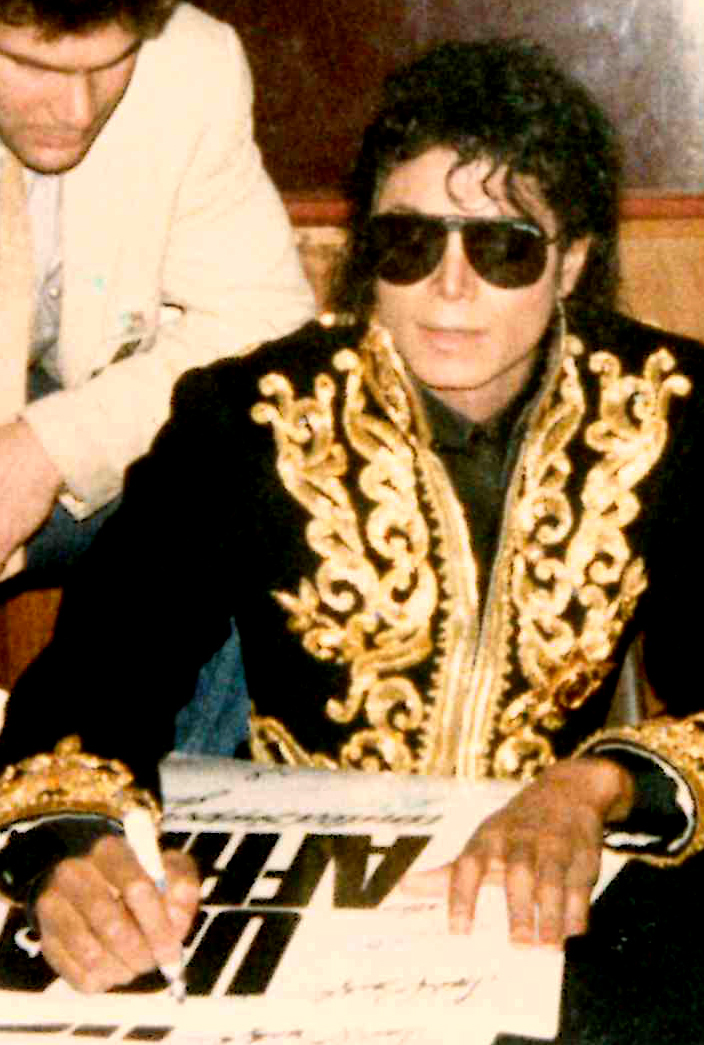
Jackson collaborated with her brother Michael (pictured) on "Scream", the most expensive music video of all time.

| Year | Title | Originating album | Director(s) | Ref. |
|---|---|---|---|---|
| 1984 | "Dream Street" | Dream Street | Debbie Allen | |
| 1986 | "What Have You Done for Me Lately" | Control | Brian Jones and Piers Ashworth | |
| 1986 | "Nasty" | Control | Mary Lambert | |
| 1986 | "When I Think of You" | Control | Julien Temple | |
| 1986 | "Control" | Control | Mary Lambert | |
| 1987 | "Let's Wait Awhile" | Control | Dominic Sena | |
| 1987 | "Diamonds"^{1} (with Herb Alpert) | Keep Your Eye on Me | — | |
| 1987 | "The Pleasure Principle" | Control | Dominic Sena | |
| 1989 | "2300 Jackson Street" (as part of The Jacksons) | 2300 Jackson Street | Greg Gold | |
| 1989 | "Miss You Much" | Janet Jackson's Rhythm Nation 1814 | Dominic Sena | |
| 1989 | "Rhythm Nation" | Janet Jackson's Rhythm Nation 1814 | Dominic Sena | |
| 1989 | "The Knowledge" | Janet Jackson's Rhythm Nation 1814 | Dominic Sena | |
| 1990 | "Escapade" | Janet Jackson's Rhythm Nation 1814 | Peter Smillie | |
| 1990 | "Alright"^{2} | Janet Jackson's Rhythm Nation 1814 | Julien Temple | |
| 1990 | "Come Back to Me" | Janet Jackson's Rhythm Nation 1814 | Dominic Sena | |
| 1990 | "Black Cat" | Janet Jackson's Rhythm Nation 1814 | Wayne Isham | |
| 1990 | "Love Will Never Do (Without You)"^{3} | Janet Jackson's Rhythm Nation 1814 | Herb Ritts | |
| 1992 | "The Best Things in Life Are Free"^{1} (with Luther Vandross featuring BBD and Ralph Tresvant) | Mo' Money | Paris Barclay | |
| 1993 | "That's the Way Love Goes"^{4} | janet. | René Elizondo Jr. | |
| 1993 | "If"^{5} | janet. | Dominic Sena | |
| 1993 | "Again"^{6} | janet. | René Elizondo Jr. | |
| 1994 | "Because of Love" | janet. | Beth McCarthy-Miller | |
| 1994 | "Any Time, Any Place"^{7} | janet. | Keir McFarlane | |
| 1994 | "You Want This"^{8} | janet. | Keir McFarlane | |
| 1995 | "Whoops Now" | janet. | Yuri Elizondo | |
| 1995 | "What'll I Do" | janet. | Yuri Elizondo | |
| 1995 | "Scream" (with Michael Jackson) | HIStory: Past, Present and Future, Book I | Mark Romanek | |
| 1995 | "Runaway" | Design of a Decade: 1986–1996 | Marcus Nispel | |
| 1996 | "Twenty Foreplay" | Design of a Decade: 1986–1996 | Keir McFarlane | |
| 1997 | "Got 'til It's Gone" (featuring Q-Tip and Joni Mitchell) | The Velvet Rope | Mark Romanek | |
| 1997 | "Together Again" | The Velvet Rope | Seb Janiak | |
| 1997 | "Together Again (Deeper Remix)" | The Velvet Rope | René Elizondo Jr. | |
| 1998 | "I Get Lonely"^{9} | The Velvet Rope | Paul Hunter | |
| 1998 | "Go Deep" | The Velvet Rope | Jonathan Dayton and Valerie Faris | |
| 1998 | "You" | The Velvet Rope | David Mallet | |
| 1998 | "Every Time" | The Velvet Rope | Matthew Rolston and Howard Schatz | |
| 1999 | "What's It Gonna Be?!" (with Busta Rhymes) | Extinction Level Event: The Final World Front | Hype Williams | |
| 1999 | "Girlfriend/Boyfriend" (with Blackstreet featuring Ja Rule and Eve) | Finally | Joseph Kahn | |
| 2000 | "Doesn't Really Matter" | Nutty Professor II: The Klumps | Joseph Kahn | |
| 2001 | "All for You" | All for You | Dave Meyers | |
| 2001 | "Someone to Call My Lover"^{10} | All for You | Francis Lawrence | |
| 2001 | "Son of a Gun (I Betcha Think This Song Is About You)"^{11} (with Carly Simon featuring Missy Elliott) | All for You | Francis Lawrence | |
| 2002 | "Feel It Boy" (with Beenie Man) | Tropical Storm | Dave Meyers | |
| 2004 | "Janet Megamix 04" | Non-album single | Various | |
| 2004 | "Just a Little While"^{12} | Damita Jo | Dave Meyers | |
| 2004 | "I Want You" | Damita Jo | Dave Meyers | |
| 2004 | "All Nite (Don't Stop)"^{13} | Damita Jo | Francis Lawrence | |
| 2006 | "Call on Me" (with Nelly) | 20 Y.O. | Hype Williams | |
| 2006 | "So Excited"^{14} (featuring Khia) | 20 Y.O. | Joseph Kahn | |
| 2008 | "Feedback"^{15} | Discipline | Saam Farahmand | |
| 2008 | "Rock with U" | Discipline | Saam Farahmand | |
| 2009 | "Make Me" | Number Ones | Robert Hales | |
| 2010 | "We Are the World 25 for Haiti" (As part of Artists for Haiti) | Non-album single | Paul Haggis | |
| 2010 | "Nothing" | Why Did I Get Married Too? | Tim Palen | |
| 2015 | "No Sleeep" (featuring J. Cole) | Unbreakable | Dave Meyers | |
| 2016 | "Dammn Baby" | Unbreakable | Dave Meyers | |
| 2018 | "Made for Now" (with Daddy Yankee) | Non-album single | Dave Meyers | |
| 2018 | "Made for Now" (Vertical Video) (with Daddy Yankee) | Non-album single | Dave Meyers | |
| 2018 | "Made for Now" (BlameItonKway & King Bach Version) (with Daddy Yankee, BlameItonKway and King Bach) | Non-album single | Diamond Batiste and BlameItonKway | |

Footnotes:

- ^{1} Music videos for collaborations "Diamonds", "The Best Things in Life Are Free" and "Luv Me, Luv Me" do not feature Jackson.
- ^{2} An extended version of "Alright" features additional footage and Heavy D.
- ^{3} A black-and-white version of "Love Will Never Do (Without You)" was also released.
- ^{4} An alternate version of "That's the Way Love Goes" known as the "One Take Version" was included on janet.: The Videos.
- ^{5} An alternate version of "If" known as the "All Dance Version" focuses solely on Jackson's choreography and omits the club patrons.
- ^{6} A second version of "Again" features slightly altered scenes and footage from Jackson's debut film Poetic Justice.
- ^{7} The remix video of "Any Time, Any Place" features additional scenes of voyeurism as various extras observe Jackson during intimacy.
- ^{8} A black-and-white version of "You Want This" was also released.
- ^{9} The "TNT Remix" video for "I Get Lonely" features scenes with Blackstreet.
- ^{10} The So So Def remix video of "Someone to Call My Lover" features Jermaine Dupri.
- ^{11} A second version of "Son of a Gun (I Betcha Think This Song Is About You)", for the P. Diddy Remix, features scenes with P. Diddy.
- ^{12} A live version of "Just a Little While" filmed at London's Channel 4 was released exclusively on From janet. to Damita Jo: The Videos.
- ^{13} An edited version of "All Nite (Don't Stop)" omits brief intimacy between Jackson and her dancers.
- ^{14} A revised version of "So Excited" censors nudity using x-ray scenes.
- ^{15} The director's cut of "Feedback" features slightly altered scenes and editing.

== Video albums ==
| Title | Album details | Peak chart positions | Certifications |
| Title | Album details | US Music Video Sales | Certifications |
|---|---|---|---|
| Control – The Videos | Released: 1986; Label: A&M; Formats: Laserdisc, VHS | 1 | RIAA: Platinum |
| Control – The Videos Part II | Released: 1987; Label: A&M; Formats: Laserdisc, VHS | 1 | RIAA: Gold |
| Rhythm Nation 1814 | Released: 1989; Label: A&M; Formats: Laserdisc, VHS | 2 | RIAA: 2× Platinum |
| The Rhythm Nation Compilation | Released: 1989; Label: A&M; Formats: DVD, Laserdisc, VHS | 4 | RIAA: 2× Platinum |
| janet. | Released: 1994; Label: Virgin; Formats: Laserdisc, VHS | 5 | RIAA: Gold |
| Design of a Decade: 1986–1996 | Released: 1995; Label: Virgin; Formats: DVD, Video CD, Laserdisc, VHS | 1 | RIAA: Gold |
| All for You: DVD Edition | Released: 2001; Label: Virgin; Formats: DVD, Video CD | 2 | |
| From Janet to Damita Jo: The Videos | Released: 2004; Label: Virgin; Formats: DVD | 18 | |

== Live video albums ==
| Title | Album details | Peak | | | | | Certifications |
| Title | Album details | US | AUS | JPN | NED | UK | Certifications |
|---|---|---|---|---|---|---|---|
| The Velvet Rope Tour: Live in Concert | Released: 1999; Label: Eagle Rock Entertainment; Formats: DVD, Video CD, Laserdisc, VHS | 2 | 1 | — | — | 2 | RIAA: Platinum; ARIA: Platinum; CRIA: Platinum |
| Janet: Live in Hawaii | Released: 2002; Label: Eagle Rock Entertainment; Formats: DVD, Video CD | 1 | 1 | 6 | 2 | 6 | RIAA: Platinum; ARIA: Platinum; MC: Platinum |
"—" denotes items with chart positions which are unavailable.
