= Dream Street (disambiguation) =

Dream Street is a teen pop group or a boy band from the late 1990s to the early 2000s.

Dream Street may also refer to:

- Dream Street (Dream Street album), 2001
- Dream Street (Janet Jackson album), 1984
  - "Dream Street" (song), a 1984 song by Janet Jackson
- Dream Street (Peggy Lee album), 1957
- Dream Street (film), 1921 film directed by D. W. Griffith
- Dream Street (British TV series), a British children's TV series of the 1990s
- Dream Street (American TV series), an American TV series from the late 1980s
- Dream Street (musical), a musical that ran in Las Vegas from 1983 through 1987
