= The Pleasure Principle (song) =

1987 single by Janet Jackson

Single by Janet Jackson

from the album Control
- B-side: "Fast Girls"
- Released: May 12, 1987
- Recorded: October 1985
- Studio: Flyte Tyme (Minneapolis, Minnesota)
- Genre: Dance-pop; R&B; freestyle
- Length: 4:58
- Label: A&M
- Songwriter: Monte Moir
- Producers: Monte Moir; Janet Jackson; Steve Wiese

Janet Jackson singles chronology
"Diamonds" (1987)	"The Pleasure Principle" (1987)	"Making Love in the Rain" (1987)

Music video
- "The Pleasure Principle" on YouTube

"The Pleasure Principle" is a song recorded by American singer Janet Jackson for her third studio album, Control (1986). A&M Records released it as the sixth single from Control on May 12, 1987. Written and produced by Monte Moir, with co-production by Jackson and Steve Wiese, the song is an "independent woman" anthem about taking control of a personal relationship by refusing to settle for loveless materialism. Musically, "The Pleasure Principle" is an R&B song built around a dance-pop beat. The photograph for the single cover was shot by David LaChapelle. The song has been included in two of Jackson's greatest hits albums, Design of a Decade: 1986–1996 (1995) and Number Ones (2009).

"The Pleasure Principle" received positive reviews from music critics and was a modest commercial success. In the United States, it peaked at number 14 on the Billboard Hot 100. The single also peaked at number one on the Dance Club Songs and Hot R&B/Hip-Hop Songs charts. "The Pleasure Principle" reached the top 40 in most markets, but failed to match the international success of the previous singles from Control. It peaked at number 50 in Australia, number 35 in Canada and number 24 in the United Kingdom.

The accompanying music video for "The Pleasure Principle" was directed by Dominic Sena. It depicts Jackson entering a loft wearing a T-shirt and jeans to practice her dancing. She gives a solo dance performance while singing about the pleasure principle. The video was seen by critics as iconic and received two nominations at the 1988 MTV Video Music Awards, eventually winning one. "The Pleasure Principle" has been performed on many of Jackson's concert tours, most recently on the Janet Jackson: Together Again Tour (2023). It was also performed on a few promotional appearances, including at the 2006 Billboard Music Awards. In 2008, Jackson's lingerie line was named after the song.

== Background and development ==
"I usually attempt to swipe as broad of a brushstroke as possible in regard to telling a story and expressing as much emotion around it as I can, which can be tricky when you only have a set number of lines to do it. It was about being in a situation that was no longer working and that she no longer wants to be a part of. There was also the metaphor of riding in a limo in the relationship vs. her 'meter running', and taking a cab to leave. That sounds so 80's to me right now."

— Songwriter and producer Monte Moir on the lyrics of "The Pleasure Principle".

After arranging a recording contract with A&M Records in 1982 for a then 16-year-old Jackson, her father Joe oversaw the entire production of her eponymous debut studio album and its follow-up, Dream Street (1984). In 1985, Jackson subsequently fired her father as her manager and hired John McClain, then A&M's senior vice president of artists and repertoire and general manager. Commenting on the decision, Jackson stated, "I just wanted to get out of the house, get out from under my father, which was one of the most difficult things that I had to do, telling him that I didn't want to work with him again." McClain subsequently introduced her to the songwriting and production duo Jimmy Jam and Terry Lewis, former Prince associates and ex-members of The Time.

"The Pleasure Principle" was the only song not to be written or produced by Jam and Lewis. Instead, it was penned by Monte Moir, The Time's keyboardist. At the time, he was working with his old band colleagues at Flyte Tyme recording studios in Minneapolis when they were offered the project for the album with Jackson, and Moir was asked to come up with some demos. He did not have a concept or title for the song at first, which was not uncommon for the producer. According to Moir, "As verses started to take shape, I had to figure out what it was I was trying to say, I just stumbled into the title and Freudian concept (of the pleasure principle) and realized it fit." After songwriting was done, Moir recorded it "fairly quickly" as there were a lot of projects going on at one studio.

== Composition ==
Written and produced by Moir, "The Pleasure Principle" is lyrically about the singer taking control of a personal relationship by refusing to settle for loveless materialism, while Jackson sings, "What I thought was happiness was only part time bliss". The song parallels a fleeting love affair with a ride in a limousine. It mentions a "Big Yellow Taxi", alluding to the 1970 Joni Mitchell song, which Jackson would later sample on her single "Got 'til It's Gone" from her sixth studio album The Velvet Rope (1997). Sal Cinquemani from Slant Magazine noted that musically "synths bump like busted shock absorbers and the electric guitar screeches like rubber on pavement".

== Critical reception ==
"The Pleasure Principle" received generally positive reviews from music critics. Kareem Gantt from AXS commented that compared to "Control" and "Nasty", "The Pleasure Principle" was more toned down, but "still a sonic groover". The song was nominated for Best R&B/Soul Single – Female at the 1988 Soul Train Music Awards. In 2022, Rolling Stone ranked the Shep Pettibone Vocal Mix of "The Pleasure Principle" number 145 in their list of the "200 Greatest Dance Songs of All Time".

== Chart performance ==
In the United States, "The Pleasure Principle" debuted at number 78 on the Billboard Hot 100 on the issue dated May 23, 1987. It later reached its peak position of number 14 on August 1, 1987. It became the first single released by Jackson to miss the top-ten until "Son of a Gun (I Betcha Think This Song Is About You)" peaked at number 28 in 2001. "The Pleasure Principle" nevertheless became her fifth chart-topper on the Hot R&B/Hip-Hop Songs chart and her third on the Dance Club Songs chart. It was ranked number 34 on the Hot R&B/Hip-Hop Songs Year-End chart of 1987.

Elsewhere, "The Pleasure Principle" reached the top 40 in most markets, but failed to match the international success of the previous singles from Control.

== Music video ==
=== Background and synopsis ===
The accompanying music video for "The Pleasure Principle" was directed by American director Dominic Sena and premiered on MTV on June 1, 1987. Choreography was handled by Barry Lather. In the beginning of the video, Jackson enters a loft wearing a T-shirt and jeans to practice her dancing. She gives a solo dance performance while singing about the pleasure principle. Elements of the choreography incorporate a chair and a microphone stand.

=== Reception ===
At the 1988 MTV Video Music Awards, the video won for Best Choreography and was nominated for Best Female Video. While reviewing Jackson's video album Rhythm Nation Compilation (1989), Wendy Robinson from PopMatters commented that "this is the first video in which Jackson appears alone, with a sleek new hairdo and unleashing a repertoire of exciting new moves", and Justin Joseph from Centric TV noted that the video was "probably more iconic than the song", while describing its choreography as "so dynamic".

=== Legacy ===
The video has been re-enacted by singers Mýa, Ciara, Tinashe, and Normani. In 2000, Britney Spears referred to "The Pleasure Principle", as well as Jackson's video for "Miss You Much", for the chair routine on her music video for "Stronger", with director Joseph Kahn saying her idea was inspired by "the iconic chair sequence" in "The Pleasure Principle". A review of the video commented "Ms. Spears gives us her best Janet Jackson impression ('Miss You Much') with a dizzying chair-dance routine." Jennifer Lopez also cited Jackson as a major inspiration for her own dance and videos, stating that she "probably started dancing" because of Jackson's music video for "The Pleasure Principle".

In 2006, Cassie was accused of copying "The Pleasure Principle"'s concept on her music video for "Me & U", described as evoking Jackson's "impromptu solo dance rehearsal" during the video's mirror scenes. Cassie stated, "I'm a diehard Janet Jackson fan. A lot of people compare my video for 'Me & U' to hers for 'Pleasure Principle'. I was just rehearsing in the studio, they filmed me and the record label thought it would be great for the video. I'd love to emulate her career. She's incredible, from her moves to her voice."

== Live performances ==
Jackson has performed the song on most of her concert tours, excluding the Janet World Tour and the All for You Tour. "The Pleasure Principle" was performed during a "frenzied" medley with "Control", "Nasty" and "Throb" on The Velvet Rope Tour in 1998. The medley at the October 11, 1998 show at Madison Square Garden in New York City was broadcast during a special titled The Velvet Rope: Live in Madison Square Garden by HBO. It was also added to the set list at its DVD release, The Velvet Rope Tour: Live in Concert in 1999.

On December 4, 2006, while promoting her ninth studio album 20 Y.O., Jackson opened the 2006 Billboard Music Awards with a medley of "Control" and "The Pleasure Principle", and then-new single "So Excited", accompanied by black and red-clad dancers. For her first tour in seven years, Rock Witchu Tour (2008), she chose to open the show with a medley of "The Pleasure Principle", "Control", and "What Have You Done for Me Lately". After an interlude, Jackson made her entrance amid fireworks and theatrical smoke to perform the medley, while donning a Mohawk hairstyle. It was also included as the opening song on her Number Ones, Up Close and Personal tour in 2011. Jackson included the song on the Unbreakable World Tour (2015–2016) and on the State of the World Tour (2017–2019) in a medley with "What Have You Done for Me Lately" and "Control". Jackson included the song at her Las Vegas concert residency show, Janet Jackson: Metamorphosis (2019). Jackson also performed the song on her 2023 tour Janet Jackson: Together Again.

== Track listing and formats ==
- US 7-inch vinyl single

A. "The Pleasure Principle" – 4:58
B. "Fast Girls" – 3:20

- US and European 12-inch vinyl single / Australian limited-edition 12-inch vinyl single

A1. "The Pleasure Principle" (Long Vocal Mix) – 7:23
A2. "The Pleasure Principle" (A cappella) – 4:23
B1. "The Pleasure Principle" (12" Dub) – 6:58
B2. "The Pleasure Principle" (7" Vocal Mix) – 4:19

- UK and European 7-inch vinyl single

A. "The Pleasure Principle" (The Shep Pettibone Mix) – 4:19
B. "The Pleasure Principle" (Dub Edit – The Shep Pettibone Mix) – 5:10

- UK 12-inch vinyl single

A1. "The Pleasure Principle" (Long Vocal Mix) – 7:28
B1. "The Pleasure Principle" (Dub Edit) – 6:58
B2. "The Pleasure Principle" (A cappella) – 4:19

- UK CD single and 12-inch single ("The Pleasure Principle"/"Alright" – Danny Tenaglia/Todd Terry Mixes)
1. "The Pleasure Principle" (Legendary Club Mix) – 8:16
2. "The Pleasure Principle" (NuFlava Vocal Dub) – 7:21
3. "The Pleasure Principle" (Banji Dub) – 7:10
4. "The Pleasure Principle" (D.T.'s Twilo Dub) – 9:04
5. "Alright" (Tee's Club Mix) – 6:22
6. "Alright" (Tee's Beats) – 3:25

== Charts ==
=== Weekly charts ===
Chart (1987)	Peak position
Australia (Kent Music Report)	50
Belgium (Ultratop 50 Flanders)	17
Canada Top Singles (RPM)	35
Europe (European Hot 100 Singles)	74
Ireland (IRMA)	23
Luxembourg (Radio Luxembourg)	25
Netherlands (Dutch Top 40)	15
Netherlands (Single Top 100)	25
New Zealand (Recorded Music NZ)	37
UK Singles (Official Charts)	24
US Billboard Hot 100	14
US Dance Club Songs (Billboard)	1
US Dance Singles Sales (Billboard)	8
US Hot R&B/Hip-Hop Songs (Billboard)	1
US Cash Box Top 100	13

=== Year-end charts ===
Chart (1987)	Rank position
US Crossover Singles (Billboard)	7
US Dance Club Songs (Billboard)	20
US Hot R&B/Hip-Hop Songs (Billboard)	34

== Release history ==
Release dates and formats for "The Pleasure Principle"
Region	Date	Format(s)	Label(s)	Ref.
United States	May 12, 1987	12-inch; 7-inch; cassette single	A&M	
Japan	May 21, 1987	12-inch; 7-inch	A&M	
United Kingdom	June 1, 1987	12-inch; 7-inch; cassette single	A&M; Breakout	
Japan	May 21, 1988	CD single	A&M	
United Kingdom	April 8, 1996	CD single; double 12-inch	A&M; AM:PM	
