= Witness: The Tour =

2017–2018 concert tour by Katy Perry

- Tour by Katy Perry
- Promotional poster
- Associated album: Witness
- Start date: September 19, 2017
- End date: August 21, 2018
- Legs: 7
- No. of shows: 115
- Supporting acts: Noah Cyrus; Purity Ring; Martin Avari; Carly Rae Jepsen; Augusto Schuster; Lali; Valéria; Bebe Rexha; Zedd; India Carney; CYN; Tove Styrke; Hailee Steinfeld; The Dolls; Elle B; Starley

Katy Perry concert chronology
- Prismatic World Tour (2014–2015); Witness: The Tour (2017–2018); Play (2021–2023)

Witness: The Tour was the fourth concert tour by American singer Katy Perry, in support of her fifth studio album, Witness (2017). The tour began on September 19, 2017, in Montreal, Canada, and concluded on August 21, 2018, in Auckland, New Zealand. Perry visited North America, South America, Asia, Europe, Africa and Oceania. The tour ran for 7 legs and 115 shows, and its supporting acts included musicians such as Noah Cyrus, Carly Rae Jepsen, Bebe Rexha, Zedd, and Hailee Steinfeld, alongside others.

At the end of 2017, the tour placed at number 77 on Pollstar's "2017 Year-End Top 100 Worldwide Tours" list, estimating that it grossed $28.1 million and that 266,300 people attended throughout the year. In July 2018, Pollstar ranked the tour on number 14 at the Mid Year Top 100 Worldwide Tours 2018 with $48.8 million and 577,617 of tickets sold in 54 shows. In December 2018, Pollstar ranked the tour at number 29 with $55.3 million gross and 633,827 tickets sold in 52 shows. Their box office reports revealed that the tour grossed an average of $1.26 million, while according to Billboard, it was selling an average of 11,560 tickets per show.

== Development ==
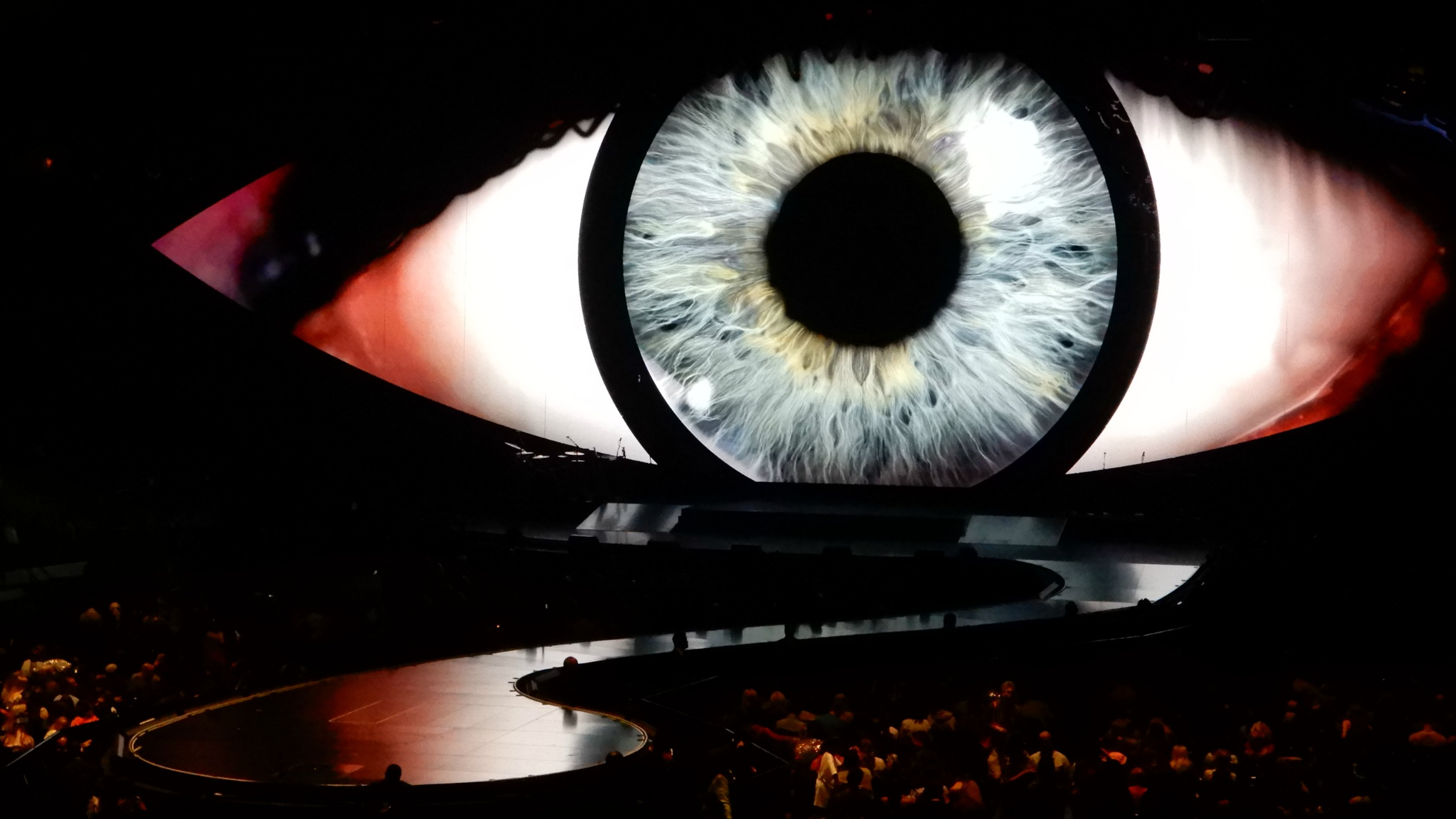
The stage for the tour with the eye-related imagery

Perry first announced on May 15, 2017, that her fifth album Witness would be released on June 9, 2017, and that she would embark on Witness: The Tour in support of it. Copies of the album are included along with the purchased tickets. During the North American leg of the tour, one dollar from each ticket purchased will go to the Boys & Girls Clubs of America, and fans will also have a chance to win free tickets by doing volunteer work for that organization via Global Citizen. The tour was originally scheduled to begin in Columbus on September 7, 2017. However, Perry revealed on August 17, that due to production delays, the tour had been rescheduled to begin on September 19, 2017. She also announced that Noah Cyrus, Purity Ring and Carly Rae Jepsen would respectively serve as opening acts from September 19 to November 1; November 7 to December 20; and January 5, 2018, to February 5, 2018. The singer later added a final Canadian date for February 6 with Jepsen.

On June 2, 2017, a week prior the release of Witness, European dates were announced. An extra date for London, Amsterdam, Paris as well as dates in Barcelona and Lisbon (this one part of the Rock In Rio festival) were later added. On March 6, 2018, Perry announced that Tove Styrke and Hailee Steinfeld will be the opening acts in Europe. Styrke will open the shows from May 23 until June 10, while Steinfeld from June 14 to June 28.

In July 2017, it was revealed that the tour will then visit Oceania from July 2018 to August 2018. In July 2017, three additional Australian dates were added following popular demand, resulting in 14 shows scheduled during the leg. On May 9, 2018, Perry announced two more shows, one in Adelaide and one in Sydney.

In October 2017, she announced three concerts in Mexico the following May taking place on the 3rd, 8th, and 11th. An additional concert for the country in Monterrey was added for May 9 after the first one sold out, and another show in Mexico City was added the following month for Mexico City on May 4. Other dates in Latin America were later added to the itinerary, including shows in Brazil, Chile, Argentina and Peru.

Perry also visited Asia between March and April 2018 and Africa in July 2018.

=== "Witness: Coming Home" ===
On March 13, 2018, Perry announced "Witness: Coming Home", a benefit concert that was held in her hometown of Santa Barbara, California, which will benefit those who are still recovering from the aftermath of the 2017 California wildfires and 2018 Southern California mudflows. Perry partnered with the Santa Barbara Foundation, the 93108 Fund and The 805 UndocuFund, which all help in assisting members of the community in the Santa Barbara area through grants and various philanthropic efforts.

== Concert synopsis ==
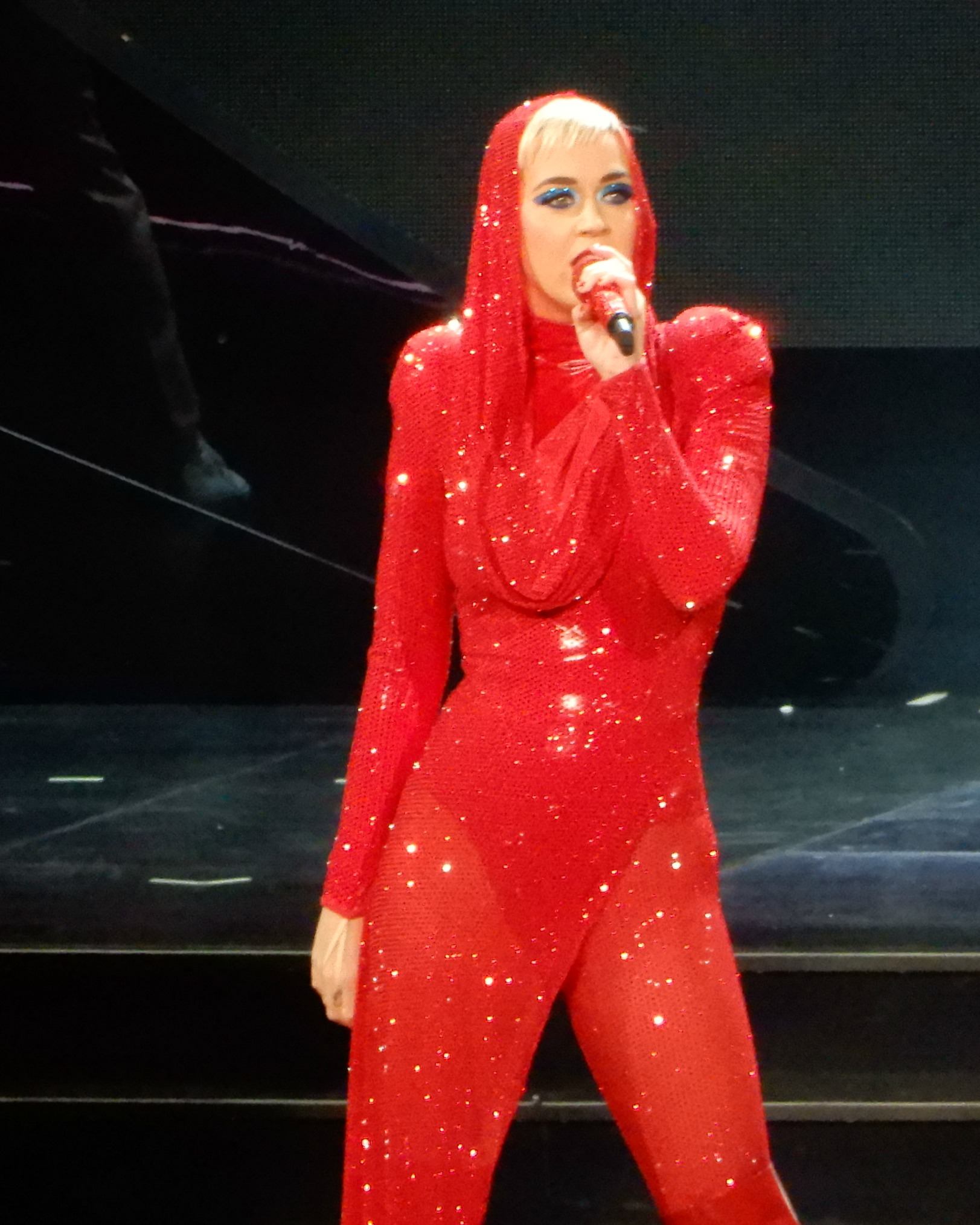
Perry performing at Madison Square Garden, New York City in October 2017

The show was divided into five segments—"Manifesto", "Retrospective", "Sexual Discovery", "Introspective", and "Emergence"—and concluded with an encore. Shortly before the show begins, the stage's eye-shaped screen displays a video of Perry's eye for a few moments. The eye transforms into a galaxy and a journey through outer space is shown, leading to a red-colored planet. The screen opens to reveal Perry riding upon a star-shaped structure, wearing a bejeweled and hooded red outfit with sunglasses. She performs the chorus of "Witness", followed by "Roulette" which she sings on top of giant climbable dice. "Dark Horse" is then sung, with Perry and her dancers atop of moving platforms. Perry performs "Chained to the Rhythm" next, with large puppets dressed in suits and sporting televisions for heads moving around the stage.

A video interlude is played that shows a clock running backward alongside childhood photos of Perry, as her backing singers perform portions of "Act My Age". Perry emerges wearing a pantsuit with a grid design, while her dancers wear shape-themed outfits. "Teenage Dream" is performed, which culminates in Perry and her dancers performing synchronized choreography while sitting on a floating cuboid. Perry removes her jacket to reveal a light-emitting diode (LED) top that displays the lyrics of "Hot n Cold" as Perry performs the song with an electric guitar. "Hot n Cold" transitions into "Last Friday Night (T.G.I.F.)", which Perry and her backing singers perform at the front of the stage. Puppets in the shape of flamingos are guided around the stage by dancers during this number. Perry's female dancers wear paper doll cut-outs of her outfits during "California Gurls", and she is also joined by the Left Shark that featured in her Super Bowl XLIX halftime show. Perry and the Left Shark then typically bring out an oversized telephone, with which Perry calls someone close to her, such as her parents. Giant lips emerge from behind the stage, which Perry is lifted inside while performing "I Kissed a Girl".

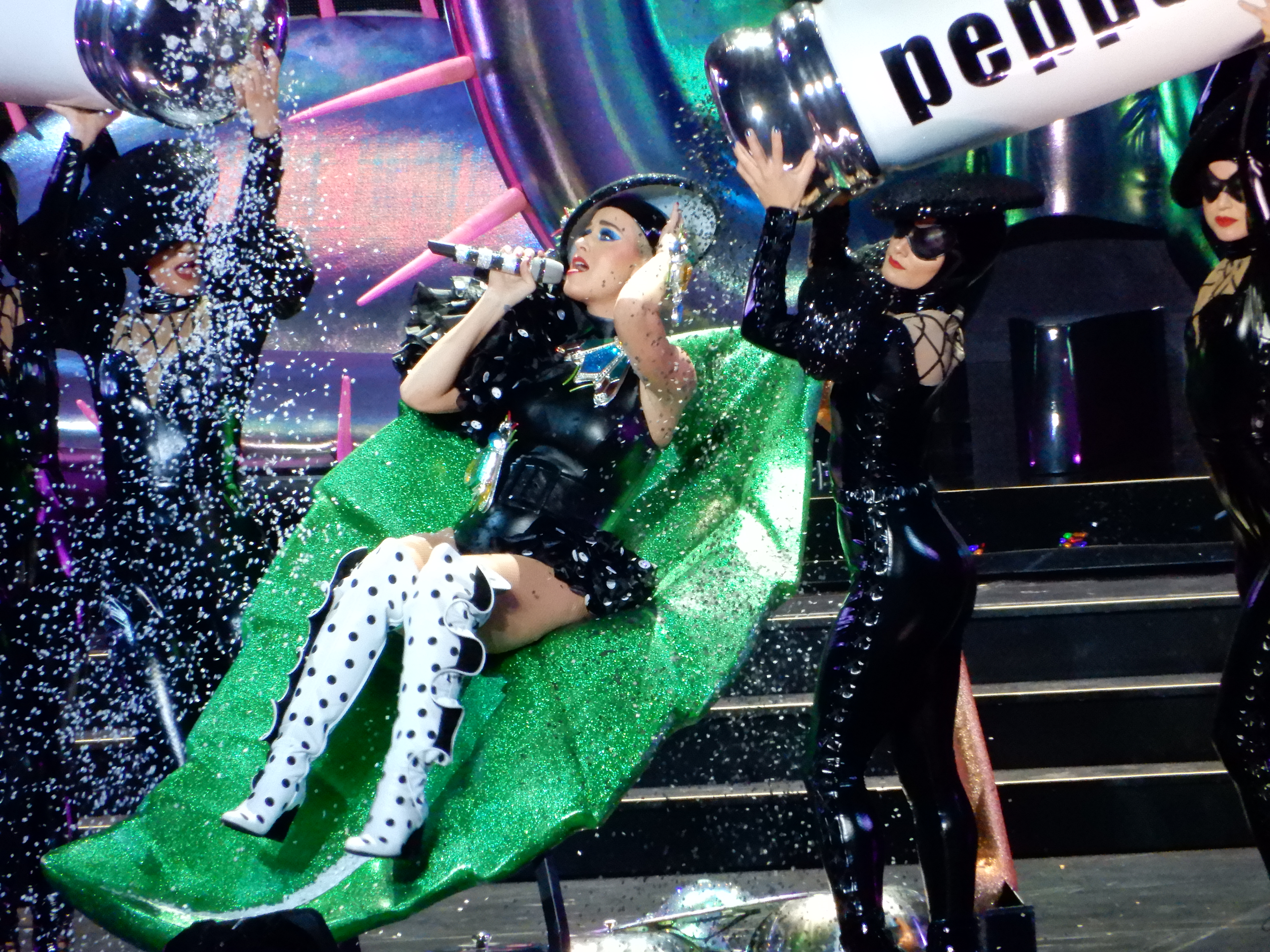
Perry and dancers performing "Bon Appétit"

An interlude is played, which features Perry floating through space. The stage is adorned with huge roses, and Perry emerges wearing a black-and-white, polka dot latex outfit. She performs "Déjà Vu", followed by "Tsunami", during which she dances on a rotating pole. Venus flytrap props are added to the stage, and Perry sings "E.T." as she is joined onstage by a dancer in stilts, dressed as an alien insect. "Bon Appétit" is performed next. Towards the end of the song, jeweled flies are attached to Perry's costume and she lies on a leaf, while dancers pour glitter on her from oversized salt and pepper shakers. The performance samples a portion of Janet Jackson's song "What Have You Done for Me Lately", which Perry performs with her backing singers. Perry exits the stage for a short time, while multi-colored planets descend from the venue's ceiling, and Perry emerges from a planet wearing a crystal-covered gown and wig. She sings "Thinking of You" / "Wide Awake" with an acoustic guitar as the planet she is sitting on flies around the venue. After performing "Save as Draft", Perry then moves to the Drop Zone, an area of the stage in which she is closest to fans. She invites a fan to join her on stage before singing "Power", at the end of which Perry is given angel wings.

The next segment of the show is introduced with a video interlude showing Perry wearing a motorcycle helmet. She appears from behind the stage riding a motorcycle and wearing a striped blue outfit, and performs "Hey Hey Hey", followed by "Part of Me". A huge basketball net appears on stage for "Swish Swish", which Perry sings alongside dancers holding inflatable basketballs. Perry interrupts the song to hold an impromptu basketball game, during which she competes against a father of a young attendee from the audience. She finishes the song joined by her dancers on trampolines. "Roar" is performed next, while a large lion's head emerges from behind the screen. Perry returns to sing "Firework" for the encore, which she performs wearing a sequined purple gown on top of a hand that rises from beneath the stage. Fireworks erupt on stage during the number. At the end of the song, the hand closes up with Perry inside as she ends the show.

== Critical reception ==
Jon Caramanica from The New York Times said that the show was "game, wacky, mildly overcompensatory" with an "impeccable" set design, although he thought that the "new material" Perry performed was "among her weakest". He praised Perry's onstage charisma and despite he thought that her live vocals were often "low in the mix", he complimented the acoustic performances when the singer sat down and played on a guitar. Jeffrey Lee Puckett from USA Today praised the visuals of the show, including the "non-stop blur of explosive lights, video, huge puppets, dancers, giant basketball goals, confetti and robot Venus flytraps". However, he felt the setlist was a "less successful" aspect of the show, adding "Perry's new songs from her Witness album don't have the sharpness or pop exuberance of her older material, instead just kind of sliding into a generic beat-per-minute muddle." The Guardian's Michael Cragg called it a "desperate pop pantomime" that works best when Perry "sticks to the hits". Jordan Zivitz from the Montreal Gazette said that "extra production time could have been used to adjust some visuals whose juxtapositions and statements were as confused as they were colourful", but complimented Perry's stage presence, adding that "the energy was certainly there, with the singer staying in constant motion on a multi-stage set for two hours."

== Commercial performance ==
At the end of 2017, the tour placed at number 77 on Pollstar's "2017 Year-End Top 100 Worldwide Tours" list, estimating that it grossed $28.1 million and that 266,300 people attended throughout the year. The tour was the third best-selling female tour in the United Kingdom in 2018, according to StubHub, only behind Taylor Swift and Britney Spears.

== Set list ==
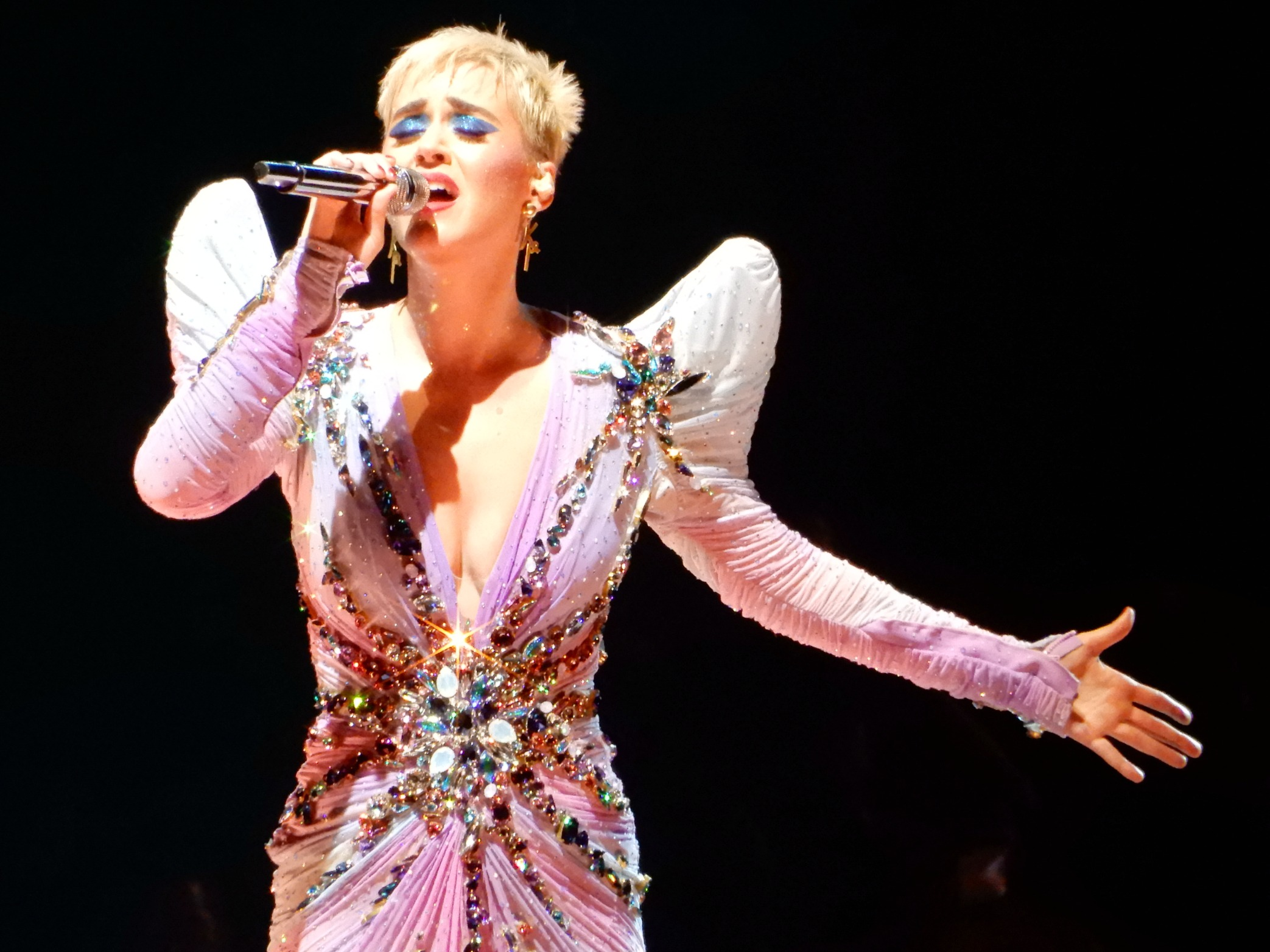
Perry closing the show with "Firework"

This set list is from the show on January 19, 2018, in Glendale. It is not intended to represent all concerts for the tour.

1. "Witness" / "Roulette"
2. "Dark Horse"
3. "Chained to the Rhythm"
4. "Act My Age" (interlude)
5. "Teenage Dream"
6. "Hot n Cold" / "Last Friday Night (T.G.I.F.)"
7. "California Gurls"
8. "I Kissed a Girl"
9. "Déjà Vu"
10. "Tsunami"
11. "E.T."
12. "Bon Appétit" (contains elements of "What Have You Done for Me Lately")
13. "Mind Maze" (interlude)
14. "Wide Awake"
15. "Thinking of You"
16. "Power"
17. "Part of Me"
18. "Swish Swish"
19. "Roar"

Encore

20. "Firework"

Notes

- "Wide Awake" was not performed during the first shows. Moreover, on selected dates, Perry performed "Save as Draft" and "Hey Hey Hey" before "Power" and "Part of Me" respectively.
- On October 6, 2017 in New York City, Perry performed an acoustic version of "Part of Me" before "Power", rather than later in the show as a dedication to her fans for coming after the 2017 Las Vegas shooting.
- On selected dates in South America, Perry performed "Unconditionally" in place of "Thinking of You". Moreover, during the concert in Rio de Janeiro, Perry dedicated the performance of "Power" to Marielle Franco, who died the week before, and called Franco's relatives onstage to express her condolences.
- From the first show in Saitama onwards, Perry performed "Into Me You See" in place of "Thinking of You".
- On selected dates, Perry performed "Pendulum" before "Firework", as part of the encore.
- On June 22, 2018 in Manchester, Perry performed "By the Grace of God" in place of "Into Me You See" as a dedication to the city due to the Manchester Arena bombing. She also dedicated "Firework" to the 22 victims of the attack.
- On June 28, 2018 in Barcelona, Perry performed a cover of "One of Us" by Joan Osborne in place of "Into Me You See".

== Tour dates ==
List of 2017 concerts, showing date, city, country, venue, opening acts, tickets sold, number of available tickets and amount of gross revenue
Dates	Cities	Countries	Venues	Opening act(s)	Attendance	Revenues
September 19, 2017 (Note: The September 19, 2017, concert at Bell Centre in Montreal was originally scheduled to take place on September 9, 2017, but was postponed due to "production delays".)	Montreal	Canada	Bell Centre	Noah Cyrus	—N/a	—N/a
September 21, 2017	Uncasville	United States	Mohegan Sun Arena	Noah Cyrus	6,334 / 6,554	$1,704,881
September 22, 2017	Pittsburgh	United States	PPG Paints Arena	Noah Cyrus	8,577 / 12,163	$752,651
September 24, 2017 (Note: The September 24, 2017, concert at Schottenstein Center in Columbus was originally scheduled to take place on September 7, 2017, marking the start of the tour, but was postponed due to "production delays".)	Columbus	United States	Schottenstein Center	Noah Cyrus	—N/a	—N/a
September 25, 2017	Washington, D.C.	United States	Capital One Arena	Noah Cyrus	11,503 / 12,511	$1,261,215
September 29, 2017	Boston	United States	TD Garden	Noah Cyrus	—N/a	—N/a
September 30, 2017	Boston	United States	TD Garden	Noah Cyrus	—N/a	—N/a
October 2, 2017	New York City	United States	Madison Square Garden	Noah Cyrus	21,688 / 22,667	$2,618,096
October 6, 2017	New York City	United States	Madison Square Garden	Noah Cyrus	21,688 / 22,667	$2,618,096
October 8, 2017	Newark	United States	Prudential Center	Noah Cyrus	10,067 / 11,307	$1,118,597
October 9, 2017 (Note: The concert of October 9, 2017, at Videotron Centre in Quebec City was originally scheduled to take place on September 10, 2017, but was postponed due to "production delays".)	Quebec City	Canada	Videotron Centre	Noah Cyrus	11,798 / 12,700	$996,542
October 11, 2017	Brooklyn	United States	Barclays Center	Noah Cyrus	9,055 / 11,712	$1,002,705
October 12, 2017 (Note: The concert of October 12, 2017, at Wells Fargo Center in Philadelphia was originally scheduled to take place on September 18, 2017, but was postponed due to "production delays".)	Philadelphia	United States	Wells Fargo Center	Noah Cyrus	—N/a	—N/a
October 16, 2017	Louisville	United States	KFC Yum! Center	Noah Cyrus	9,192 / 12,433	$689,988
October 18, 2017	Nashville	United States	Bridgestone Arena	Noah Cyrus	8,276 / 8,868	$695,458
October 22, 2017	St. Louis	United States	Scottrade Center	Noah Cyrus	—N/a	—N/a
October 24, 2017	Chicago	United States	United Center	Noah Cyrus	—N/a	—N/a
October 25, 2017	Chicago	United States	United Center	Noah Cyrus	—N/a	—N/a
October 27, 2017	Kansas City	United States	Sprint Center	Noah Cyrus	8,507 / 10,350	$820,925
October 31, 2017 (Note: The concerts of October 31, 2017, and November 1, 2017, at Air Canada Centre in Toronto were originally scheduled to take place on September 12, 2017 and September 13, 2017 respectively, but were postponed due to "production delays".)	Toronto	Canada	Air Canada Centre	Noah Cyrus	—N/a	—N/a
November 1, 2017	Toronto	Canada	Air Canada Centre	Noah Cyrus	—N/a	—N/a
November 7, 2017	Los Angeles	United States	Staples Center	Purity Ring	—N/a	—N/a
November 8, 2017	Los Angeles	United States	Staples Center	Purity Ring	—N/a	—N/a
November 10, 2017	Los Angeles	United States	Staples Center	Purity Ring	—N/a	—N/a
November 14, 2017	San Jose	United States	SAP Center	Purity Ring	10,770 / 11,798	$1,211,375
November 24, 2017	Salt Lake City	United States	Vivint Smart Home Arena	Purity Ring	—N/a	—N/a
November 26, 2017	Denver	United States	Pepsi Center	Purity Ring	9,340 / 10,198	$1,097,949
November 28, 2017	Omaha	United States	CenturyLink Center Omaha	Purity Ring	10,017 / 11,965	$769,168
November 29, 2017	Tulsa	United States	BOK Center	Purity Ring	10,243 / 11,208	$672,842
December 1, 2017	Saint Paul	United States	Xcel Energy Center	Purity Ring	—N/a	—N/a
December 2, 2017	Des Moines	United States	Wells Fargo Arena	Purity Ring	—N/a	—N/a
December 4, 2017	Milwaukee	United States	BMO Harris Bradley Center	Purity Ring	—N/a	—N/a
December 6, 2017	Detroit	United States	Little Caesars Arena	Purity Ring	11,475 / 11,475	$895,084
December 7, 2017	Grand Rapids	United States	Van Andel Arena	Purity Ring	—N/a	—N/a
December 9, 2017	Indianapolis	United States	Bankers Life Fieldhouse	Purity Ring	9,595 / 9,595	$871,077
December 10, 2017	Cleveland	United States	Quicken Loans Arena	Purity Ring	8,744 / 11,374	$896,760
December 12, 2017	Atlanta	United States	Philips Arena	Purity Ring	8,782 / 10,580	$950,017
December 15, 2017	Tampa	United States	Amalie Arena	Purity Ring	9,334 / 11,555	$981,256
December 17, 2017	Orlando	United States	Amway Center	Purity Ring	10,071 / 11,294	$1,145,356
December 20, 2017	Miami	United States	American Airlines Arena	Purity Ring	12,754 / 12,754	$1,570,092
December 31, 2017	Abu Dhabi	United Arab Emirates	du Arena	Martin Avari	22,500 / 22,500	$2,477,202

List of 2018 concerts, showing date, city, country, venue, opening acts, tickets sold, number of available tickets and amount of gross revenue
Dates	Cities	Countries	Venues	Opening act(s)	Attendance	Revenues
January 5, 2018	New Orleans	United States	Smoothie King Center	Carly Rae Jepsen	—N/a	—N/a
January 7, 2018	Houston	United States	Toyota Center	Carly Rae Jepsen	9,655 / 10,432	$1,139,385
January 10, 2018	San Antonio	United States	AT&T Center	Carly Rae Jepsen	12,637 / 12,637	$956,673
January 12, 2018	North Little Rock	United States	Verizon Arena	Carly Rae Jepsen	10,270 / 12,000	$793,991
January 14, 2018	Dallas	United States	American Airlines Center	Carly Rae Jepsen	11,341 / 11,341	$1,455,098
January 19, 2018	Glendale	United States	Gila River Arena	Carly Rae Jepsen	—N/a	—N/a
January 20, 2018	Paradise	United States	T-Mobile Arena	Carly Rae Jepsen	12,944 / 13,947	$1,230,517
January 31, 2018	Sacramento	United States	Golden 1 Center	Carly Rae Jepsen	10,635 / 11,024	$1,206,081
February 2, 2018	Portland	United States	Moda Center	Carly Rae Jepsen	11,756 / 12,530	$1,144,786
February 3, 2018	Tacoma	United States	Tacoma Dome	Carly Rae Jepsen	17,136 / 17,970	$1,436,723
February 5, 2018	Vancouver	Canada	Rogers Arena	Carly Rae Jepsen	22,888 / 24,843	$1,761,537
February 6, 2018	Vancouver	Canada	Rogers Arena	Carly Rae Jepsen	22,888 / 24,843	$1,761,537
March 8, 2018	Santiago	Chile	Pista Atlética Estadio Nacional de Chile	Augusto Schuster	15,336 / 22,191	$1,409,543
March 11, 2018	Buenos Aires	Argentina	Club Ciudad	Lali	11,369 / 13,308	$999,068
March 14, 2018 (Note: The concert of March 14, 2018 was rescheduled and relocated to Arena do Grêmio in Porto Alegre from March 15, 2018 at Pedreira Paulo Leminski in Curitiba due to high demand.)	Porto Alegre	Brazil	Arena do Grêmio	Valéria; Bebe Rexha	13,989 / 14,707	$1,161,742
March 17, 2018	São Paulo	Brazil	Allianz Parque	Bebe Rexha	37,284 / 37,284	$2,926,354
March 18, 2018 (Note: The concert of March 18, 2018, in Rio de Janeiro was relocated to Praça da Apoteose from Barra Olympic Park.)	Rio de Janeiro	Brazil	Praça da Apoteose	Bebe Rexha	11,888 / 13,509	$808,049
March 21, 2018	Lima	Peru	Jockey Club Parcela H	Bebe Rexha	8,036 / 9,136	$653,722
March 27, 2018	Saitama	Japan	Saitama Super Arena	—N/a	—N/a	—N/a
March 28, 2018	Saitama	Japan	Saitama Super Arena	—N/a	—N/a	—N/a
March 30, 2018	Hong Kong		AsiaWorld–Arena	—N/a	—N/a	—N/a
April 2, 2018	Manila	Philippines	Mall of Asia Arena	—N/a	—N/a	—N/a
April 4, 2018	Taipei	Taiwan	Taipei Arena	—N/a	—N/a	—N/a
April 6, 2018	Seoul	South Korea	Gocheok Sky Dome	—N/a	—N/a	—N/a
April 8, 2018	Singapore		Singapore Indoor Stadium	Zedd	—N/a	—N/a
April 10, 2018	Bangkok	Thailand	Impact Arena	India Carney	—N/a	—N/a
April 14, 2018	Bumi Serpong Damai	Indonesia	Indonesia Convention Exhibition	—N/a	—N/a	—N/a
May 3, 2018	Mexico City	Mexico	Arena Ciudad de México	CYN	44,000 / 44,000	$2,872,249
May 4, 2018	Mexico City	Mexico	Arena Ciudad de México	CYN	44,000 / 44,000	$2,872,249
May 8, 2018	Monterrey	Mexico	Arena Monterrey	CYN	29,000 / 29,000	$1,722,614
May 9, 2018	Monterrey	Mexico	Arena Monterrey	CYN	29,000 / 29,000	$1,722,614
May 11, 2018	Guadalajara	Mexico	Arena VFG	CYN	10,359 / 10,445	$1,093,943
May 19, 2018 (Note: The concert of May 19, 2018, at Santa Barbara Bowl in Santa Barbara is part of Witness: Coming Home, a benefit concert in Perry's hometown that will benefit who are still recovering from the aftermath of the 2017 California wildfires and 2018 Southern California mudflows.)	Santa Barbara	United States	Santa Barbara Bowl	—N/a	—N/a	—N/a
May 23, 2018	Cologne	Germany	Lanxess Arena	Tove Styrke	15,311 / 15,314	$1,330,383
May 24, 2018	Antwerp	Belgium	Sportpaleis	Tove Styrke	15,025 / 21,171	$1,255,551
May 26, 2018	Amsterdam	Netherlands	Ziggo Dome	Tove Styrke	—N/a	—N/a
May 27, 2018	Amsterdam	Netherlands	Ziggo Dome	Tove Styrke	—N/a	—N/a
May 29, 2018	Paris	France	AccorHotels Arena	Tove Styrke	29,647 / 30,921	$2,841,439
May 30, 2018	Paris	France	AccorHotels Arena	Tove Styrke	29,647 / 30,921	$2,841,439
June 1, 2018	Zürich	Switzerland	Hallenstadion	Tove Styrke	12,000 / 12,000	$1,046,880
June 2, 2018	Bologna	Italy	Unipol Arena	Tove Styrke	12,706 / 12,706	$1,134,752
June 4, 2018	Vienna	Austria	Wiener Stadthalle	Tove Styrke	—N/a	—N/a
June 6, 2018	Berlin	Germany	Mercedes-Benz Arena	Tove Styrke	—N/a	—N/a
June 8, 2018	Copenhagen	Denmark	Royal Arena	Tove Styrke	—N/a	—N/a
June 10, 2018	Stockholm	Sweden	Ericsson Globe	Tove Styrke	—N/a	—N/a
June 14, 2018	London	England	The O_{2} Arena	Hailee Steinfeld	25,913 / 29,609	$2,194,680
June 15, 2018	London	England	The O_{2} Arena	Hailee Steinfeld	25,913 / 29,609	$2,194,680
June 18, 2018	Birmingham	England	Arena Birmingham	Hailee Steinfeld	9,264 / 11,182	$835,564
June 19, 2018	Sheffield	England	Sheffield Arena	Hailee Steinfeld	6,423 / 9,251	$500,720
June 21, 2018	Liverpool	England	Echo Arena	Hailee Steinfeld	6,565 / 9,309	$509,738
June 22, 2018	Manchester	England	Manchester Arena	Hailee Steinfeld	10,558 / 11,607	$860,252
June 24, 2018	Glasgow	Scotland	SSE Hydro	Hailee Steinfeld	11,274 / 11,453	$911,064
June 25, 2018	Newcastle	England	Metro Radio Arena	Hailee Steinfeld	5,715 / 9,511	$450,802
June 28, 2018	Barcelona	Spain	Palau Sant Jordi	Hailee Steinfeld	—N/a	—N/a
June 30, 2018 (Note: The concert of June 30, 2018, at Parque da Bela Vista in Lisbon is part of Rock in Rio Lisboa festival.)	Lisbon	Portugal	Parque da Bela Vista	—N/a	—N/a	—N/a
July 18, 2018	Randburg (Note: Promoted as Johannesburg.)	South Africa	Ticketpro Dome	The Dolls; Elle B	39,616 / 40,955	$2,724,946
July 20, 2018	Randburg	South Africa	Ticketpro Dome	The Dolls; Elle B	39,616 / 40,955	$2,724,946
July 21, 2018	Randburg	South Africa	Ticketpro Dome	The Dolls; Elle B	39,616 / 40,955	$2,724,946
July 24, 2018	Perth	Australia	Perth Arena	Starley	22,633 / 22,992	$1,978,590
July 25, 2018	Perth	Australia	Perth Arena	Starley	22,633 / 22,992	$1,978,590
July 28, 2018	Adelaide	Australia	Adelaide Entertainment Centre	Starley	—N/a	—N/a
July 30, 2018	Adelaide	Australia	Adelaide Entertainment Centre	Starley	—N/a	—N/a
July 31, 2018	Adelaide	Australia	Adelaide Entertainment Centre	Starley	—N/a	—N/a
August 2, 2018	Melbourne	Australia	Rod Laver Arena	Starley	31,834 / 45,001	$3,390,085
August 3, 2018	Melbourne	Australia	Rod Laver Arena	Starley	31,834 / 45,001	$3,390,085
August 5, 2018	Melbourne	Australia	Rod Laver Arena	Starley	31,834 / 45,001	$3,390,085
August 8, 2018	Brisbane	Australia	Brisbane Entertainment Centre	Zedd	16,882 / 18,749	$1,836,124
August 10, 2018	Brisbane	Australia	Brisbane Entertainment Centre	Zedd	16,882 / 18,749	$1,836,124
August 13, 2018	Sydney	Australia	Qudos Bank Arena	Zedd	—N/a	—N/a
August 14, 2018	Sydney	Australia	Qudos Bank Arena	Zedd	—N/a	—N/a
August 16, 2018	Sydney	Australia	Qudos Bank Arena	Zedd	—N/a	—N/a
August 17, 2018	Sydney	Australia	Qudos Bank Arena	Zedd	—N/a	—N/a
August 20, 2018	Auckland	New Zealand	Spark Arena	Zedd	18,800 / 20,399	$1,655,836
August 21, 2018	Auckland	New Zealand	Spark Arena	Zedd	18,800 / 20,399	$1,655,836
Total					—	—

=== Cancelled shows ===
List of cancelled concerts, showing date, city, country, venue, and reason for cancellation
Date	City	Country	Venue	Reason
September 16, 2017	Buffalo	United States	KeyBank Center	Production delays
September 27, 2017	Charlotte	United States	Spectrum Center	Scheduling conflict
