= Don't Stand Another Chance =

Single by Janet Jackson

from the album Dream Street
- B-side: "Rock N Roll"
- Released: August 13, 1984
- Recorded: 1984
- Studio: Soundcastle Recording Studios (Los Angeles, California); Can-Am Recorders (Los Angeles, California)
- Length: 4:18
- Label: A&M
- Songwriters: Marlon Jackson; John Barnes
- Producer: Marlon Jackson

Janet Jackson singles chronology
"Don't Mess Up This Good Thing" (1983)	"Don't Stand Another Chance" (1984)	"Two to the Power of Love" (1984)

"Don't Stand Another Chance" is a song by American recording artist Janet Jackson, included on her second studio album, Dream Street (1984). It was written by Marlon Jackson and John Barnes. Marlon also produced it, and provided backing vocals along with his brothers Michael, Jermaine, Tito, and Jackie. "Don't Stand Another Chance" was released as the lead single from Dream Street on August 13, 1984, by A&M Records.

"Don't Stand Another Chance" received generally positive reviews from critics. Although it did not chart on the Billboard Hot 100, the song managed to reach number one on the Bubbling Under Hot 100 Singles. "Don't Stand Another Chance" became Jackson's second single to enter the top ten of the Hot R&B Songs chart, reaching number nine. In order to promote Dream Street and the single, Jackson performed the song on American Bandstand. She later included the song on her 2008 Rock Witchu Tour and her performance at the 2010 Essence Music Festival.

== Background ==
Jackson had initially desired to become a horse racing jockey or entertainment lawyer, with plans to support herself through acting. Despite this, she was anticipated to pursue a career in entertainment, and considered the idea after recording herself in the studio. At age seven, Jackson performed at the Las Vegas Strip at the MGM Casino and began acting in the variety show The Jacksons in 1976. The year after, she was selected to have a starring role as Penny Gordon Woods in the sitcom Good Times. She later starred in A New Kind of Family before joining the cast of Diff'rent Strokes, portraying Charlene Duprey for two years. Jackson also played the recurring role of Cleo Hewitt during the fourth season of Fame, but expressed indifference towards the series. When Jackson was sixteen, she was arranged a contract with A&M Records and released her self-titled debut album in 1982. She stated, "On my first album the songs were sort of teenage like. I wanted to make a change for my second album. The first album introduces you. The second one sets your image. I couldn't stay like that. People would still look at me as a little girl and I'd never grow".

Although the single was initially slated for a mid-July release, "Don't Stand Another Chance" was released on August 13, 1984.

== Reception ==
"Don't Stand Another Chance" received generally positive reviews from critics. Ed Hogan from AllMusic did not provide a review of the album version of "Don't Stand Another Chance", but commented that "the extended 12" mix rocks, showcasing outstanding synth work by John Barnes". A writer for Broadcast Engineering magazine stated "Though Janet Jackson does not have an outstanding voice, she handles herself with real sophistication on Dream Street", in songs like "Don't Stand Another Chance". Phil Hardy wrote in the book The Da Capo Companion to 20th-century Popular Music that "Don't Stand Another Chance" was not "much better than dance club ready-songs".

Although "Don't Stand Another Chance" did not chart on the Billboard Hot 100, it managed to reach number one on the Bubbling Under Hot 100 Singles. The song also became Jackson's second single to enter the top ten of the Hot R&B/Hip-Hop Songs chart, reaching number nine, and additionally it reached number 23 on the Hot Dance Club Play chart.

== Live performances ==
In order to promote Dream Street and the single, Jackson performed the song on American Bandstand along with "Dream Street". According to Jason Lipshutz from Billboard, the Jackson's appearance was among the ten classic moments with TV host Dick Clark on the show. Several years later, Jackson included "Don't Stand Another Chance" on her 2008 Rock Witchu Tour in the "Pre-Control Medley" section of the show. The song was later added to her performance at the 2010 Essence Music Festival, which she headlined. The song is also used during the DJ intermission on the 2017-2019 State of the World Tour.

== Track listing and formats ==
- Dutch 7" vinyl single

A: "Don't Stand Another Chance" – 4:18
B: "Rock 'N' Roll" – 4:10

- US 12" vinyl single

A1: "Don't Stand Another Chance" (Specially remixed version) – 6:52
B1: "Don't Stand Another Chance" (Dub version) – 6:52

== Credits and personnel ==
Credits adapted from Dream Street album liner notes.

- Janet Jackson – vocals
- John Barnes – producer, rhythm arrangement, keyboards, Moog synthesizer, Fairlight programming, drum programming
- Jonathan Moffet – drums
- Dino Espinosa, Jackie Jackson, Michael Jackson, Jermaine Jackson, Tito Jackson – backing vocals
- Marlon Jackson – producer, rhythm arrangement
- Bill Bottrell – engineer, mixing
- John McClain – mixing

== Charts ==
Chart (1984)	Peak position
South Africa (RISA)	40
US Bubbling Under Hot 100 (Billboard)	1
US Hot R&B/Hip-Hop Songs (Billboard)	9
US Dance Club Songs (Billboard)	23
