= Dream Street (song) =

Song by Janet Jackson

from the album Dream Street
- Released: November 20, 1984
- Genre: New wave; synth-pop; R&B
- Length: 3:57
- Label: A&M
- Songwriters: Arthur Barrow; Pete Bellotte; John Philip Shenale
- Producer: Pete Bellotte

Music video
- "Dream Street" on YouTube

"Dream Street" is a song from Janet Jackson's second album of the same name. Following the first three single releases, "Two to the Power of Love", "Fast Girls", and "Don't Stand Another Chance", the title track was also scheduled to be released in 1984, but due to low sales, the producers cancelled these plans. However, thanks to the TV show Fame, "Dream Street" did get a music video.

== Music video ==
"Dream Street" was Janet Jackson's very first music video. It is a girl's rise to stardom in the 1950s. The video starts off with Janet on a bus to Hollywood, then she finds a roommate and a friend for an apartment. The next scene is of her struggling working in a restaurant having a hard time adjusting, but she meets a man who is attracted to her and gives her a card for an audition. She tries out in a dance audition for Debbie Allen. She gets the part and the video is up to date in 1984, with Janet wearing a red leather outfit doing a dance routine.
