= Fast Girls (song) =

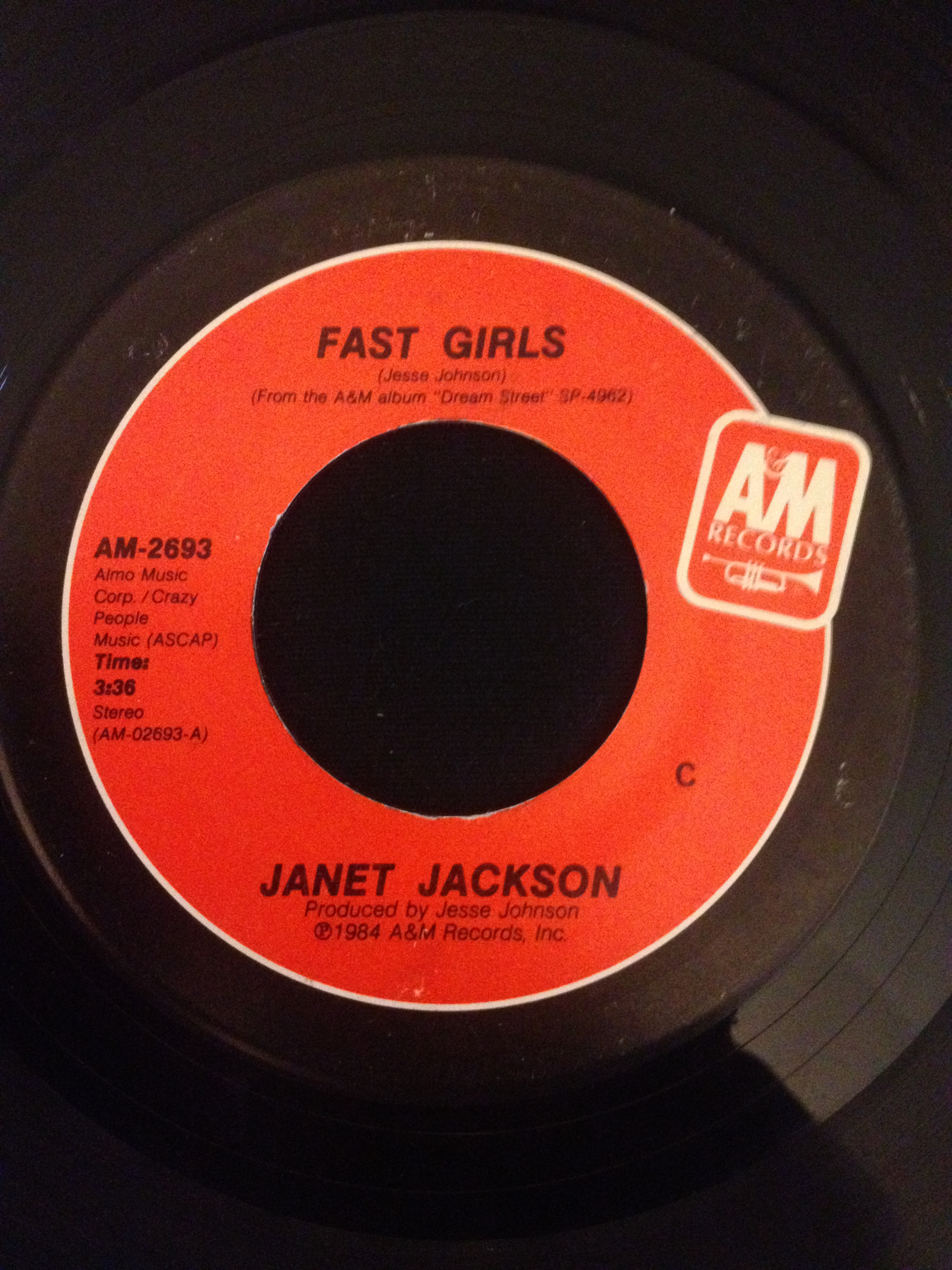

Single by Janet Jackson

from the album Dream Street
- B-side: "Love and My Best Friend" (7"); "French Blue" (12")
- Released: November 1984
- Studio: American Artists Studios (Minneapolis, MN)
- Genre: New wave; R&B
- Length: 3:18 (album version); 3:36 (single version)
- Label: A&M
- Songwriter: Jesse Johnson
- Producer: Jesse Johnson

Janet Jackson singles chronology
"Two to the Power of Love" (1984)	"Fast Girls" (1984)	"What Have You Done for Me Lately" (1986)

"Fast Girls" is a song by Janet Jackson and is the second and final US single released from Dream Street. It peaked at #40 on the R&B charts. The song was written and produced by fellow A&M artist Jesse Johnson.

The single had two different B-sides. The first B-side was "Love and My Best Friend", taken from her debut album Janet Jackson, while the second B-Side was the French Blue medley of "Fast Girls" and "Pretty Boy", which, like "Fast Girls", was also written and produced by Jesse Johnson.

The album version of "Fast Girls" was later released as the B-side of both her US singles "Control" and "The Pleasure Principle". Jesse Johnson's own version of "Fast Girls" was released shortly after as the B-side to his "I Want My Girl" single in 1985.

To date, Jackson has never performed the song live.

== Track listing and formats ==
- US 7" vinyl single

A1: "Fast Girls" (Album version) – 3:18
A2: "Fast Girls" (7" version) – 3:36

- US 7" vinyl single

A: "Fast Girls" (Single version) – 3:36
B: "Love and My Best Friend" – 4:48

- US 12" vinyl single

A: "Fast Girls" (Special remix version) – 6:59
B: "French Blue" (Remix version) – 6:22

Note

° "French Blue" is a mashup remix produced by Jesse Johnson of two songs originally produced by him: "Fast Girls" and "Pretty Boy".

== Charts ==
Chart (1984)	Peak position
US Hot R&B/Hip-Hop Songs (Billboard)	40
