= Control (Janet Jackson song) =

1986 single by Janet Jackson

Single by Janet Jackson

from the album Control
- B-side: "Fast Girls"; "Pretty Boy"
- Released: October 17, 1986
- Recorded: August 1985
- Studio: Flyte Tyme, Minneapolis, Minnesota
- Genre: Funk
- Length: 5:53 (album version); 3:26 (single edit)
- Label: A&M
- Songwriters: James Harris; Terry Lewis; Janet Jackson
- Producers: Jimmy Jam and Terry Lewis

Janet Jackson singles chronology
"When I Think of You" (1986)	"Control" (1986)	"Let's Wait Awhile" (1987)

Music video
- "Control" on YouTube

"Control" is a song by American singer Janet Jackson from her third studio album of the same name (1986). The song was written by Jackson, James Harris III and Terry Lewis, and produced by Jimmy Jam and Terry Lewis. It was released as the album's fourth single on October 17, 1986, by A&M Records. Its arrangement, built upon complex rhythmic tracks, showcased state-of-the-art production. The song is about Jackson wanting to finally take control of her life.

In 1988, the song won a Soul Train Music Award for Best R&B/Soul or Rap Music Video, beating out her brother Michael, Whitney Houston, and Jody Watley. Pitchfork included the song in its Best 200 Songs of the '80s list at number 126.

Jackson has performed the song on many of her tours, including the Rhythm Nation World Tour 1990, The Velvet Rope Tour, All for You Tour, Rock Witchu Tour, Number Ones: Up Close and Personal, Unbreakable World Tour, and the State of the World Tour. The only tour that it was not included on was the Janet World Tour. It has been included in two of Jackson's greatest hits albums, Design of a Decade: 1986–1996 (1995) and Number Ones (2009).

== Commercial performance ==
Released in 1986, the single peaked at number five on the US Billboard Hot 100, becoming Jackson's fourth consecutive top-five single on the chart; it also peaked at number one on the Hot R&B/Hip-Hop Songs and Hot Dance Club Play charts. It was the 37th biggest Hot 100 single of 1987, the fifth biggest Hot R&B/Hip-Hop Songs single of 1987, and the ninth biggest-selling 12-inch single of 1987. In the UK it missed the top 40, peaking at number 42.

== Music video ==
Jackson performing in the "Control" video

The music video for "Control" was directed by Mary Lambert, who had previously directed the video for "Nasty". The video shows Jackson playing a young singer preparing for her first gig, only to end up arguing with her parents because she wants to move out of the family home and live on her own. Her father is deadset against her plan. When he tells her they will not discuss the subject any further, she angrily storms out of the house, saying she will drive herself to the concert instead of taking the limo that has been provided for her. Just as she is about to leave for the concert, she is greeted in the driveway by Jimmy Jam and Terry Lewis, Jellybean Johnson, and Jerome Benton. They take her to a concert hall to perform her single "Control" where she shows that she wants to be "the one in control". The video version of the song is different from the album version. The nine-minute video was made available on the iTunes Store on April 27, 2007. Ja'net Dubois, who co-starred on Good Times with Jackson in the 1970s, plays her mother in the video. Paula Abdul, along with Anthony Thomas (with whom she would work with on the "Rhythm Nation" project), choreographed the video.

The live footage was recorded at the Grand Olympic Auditorium in Los Angeles. Both Lambert and producer Sharon Oreck recall it as a difficult and trying experience; Oreck said in 2011 that it was her "worst nightmare" of the many videos she had produced. The crowd, which had been told that they would see Janet Jackson perform, had expected a free concert. "Instead we gave them 50 takes of Janet lip-synching 'Control'", said Oreck.

At the time, Janet was in the midst of firing her father, Joe Jackson, from his position as her manager. Oreck said he was bitter and taking it out on everybody else. He told Oreck that he would not let Janet sit on the trapeze she is seen being lowered onto the stage in unless there was $1 million of liability insurance coverage on her. She told the record company, which responded, "Don't tell him anything, but don't tell him no, because we don't say no to Joe Jackson." This evasiveness did not work, and he became even angrier and threatened her with violence. Finally, Lambert told A&M she and Oreck would quit the video unless they told Joe Jackson his daughter was insured.

The situation got worse later in the shoot. A&M told Lambert they wanted more white people visible in the audience. There were a few scattered throughout, and under the guise of simple repositioning she began having them sit further forward. Eventually the crowd as a whole figured out what was really happening, and grew angry. Lambert told the record company representative that she absolutely could not go on due to the potential for violence, and he went out and explained things to the crowd, which calmed down enough to complete the video.

== Live performances ==
Jackson has performed the song on many of her tours, excluding the Janet World Tour. It opened her first concert tour Rhythm Nation 1814 Tour in 1990. It began with Jackson rising out of the floor perched upon a steel lift that resembled an oil rig. As she rose through the fog, she started singing the song. The song was performed during a "frenzied" medley of "Control" "The Pleasure Principle", "Nasty" and "Throb" on The Velvet Rope Tour in 1998. The medley at the October 11, 1998, show at the Madison Square Garden in New York City was broadcast during a special titled The Velvet Rope: Live in Madison Square Garden by HBO. It was also added to the setlist at its DVD release, The Velvet Rope Tour: Live in Concert in 1999. During the All for You Tour (2001–2002), "What Have You Done for Me Lately" was performed in a re-worked version, during a medley with "Control" and "Nasty". According to Denise Sheppard from Rolling Stone, it was "another crowd favorite; perhaps best dubbed as the "bitter" portion of the night", also adding that "this performer - who has been performing onstage for twenty-eight years - knows what the crowd comes for and gives it to them in spades". The February 16, 2002 final date of the tour at the Aloha Stadium in Hawaii, was broadcast by HBO, and included a performance of it. This rendition was also added to the setlist at its DVD release, Janet: Live in Hawaii, in 2002.

On December 4, 2006, Jackson opened the Billboard Music Awards with a medley of past singles "Control" and "The Pleasure Principle" and new single "So Excited", accompanied by black and red-clad dancers. For her first tour in seven years, the Rock Witchu Tour in 2008, she chose to open the show a medley with "The Pleasure Principle", "Control" and "What Have You Done for Me Lately". After an interlude, Jackson made her entrance amid fireworks and theatrical smoke to perform the medley, while donning a Mohawk hairstyle. While promoting her second greatest hits album Number Ones, the singer performed an eight-minute medley of six songs during the American Music Awards of 2009. It included "Control", "Miss You Much", "What Have You Done for Me Lately", "If", "Make Me", and finished with "Together Again". She also included the song on the Number Ones: Up Close and Personal tour (2011), the Unbreakable World Tour (2015–2016), and the State of the World Tour (2017–2019). Jackson included the song at her 2019 Las Vegas residence Janet Jackson: Metamorphosis. It was also included on her special concert series Janet Jackson: A Special 30th Anniversary Celebration of Rhythm Nation in 2019. In 2023 Jackson performed the song on her Janet Jackson: Together Again tour.

== Legacy ==
The spoken intro of "Control" was sampled on Kylie Minogue's song "Too Much of a Good Thing", from her 1991 album Let's Get to It. In 2010, the song was included in the Dance Central DLC setlist to be played using Kinect for the Xbox 360. Glee covered the song in the episode "Hold On to Sixteen", where the New Directions sang three songs originated by members of the Jackson family. Dianna Agron (as Quinn Fabray) opens the song with its spoken introduction, with leads sung by Darren Criss (as Blaine Anderson) and Kevin McHale (as Artie Abrams). The song is included on the soundtrack album Glee: The Music, Volume 7. The song is also used in the opening of the 2019 film Hustlers.

The song is also listed in the Rock and Roll Hall of Fame's list of 500 songs that shaped rock and roll.

== Track listings ==
- US and European 7-inch single

A. "Control" (edit) – 3:26
B. "Fast Girls" – 3:18

- US and European 12-inch single

A1. "Control" (extended version) – 7:33
B1. "Control" (dub version) – 5:55
B2. "Control" (a cappella) – 3:55

- UK 7-inch single

A. "Control" (edit) – 3:26
B. "Pretty Boy" – 6:32

- UK 12-inch single

A1. "Control" (extended version) – 7:33
A2. "Control" (edit) – 3:26
B1. "Control" (dub version) – 5:55
B2. "Pretty Boy" – 6:32

- Australian 12-inch single

A1. "Control" (video mix) – 7:33
B1. "Control" (dub version) – 5:55
B2. "Control" (a cappella) – 3:55

== Charts ==
=== Weekly charts ===
Chart (1986–1987)	Peak position
Australia (Kent Music Report)	82
Belgium (Ultratop 50 Flanders)	20
Canada Top Singles (RPM)	18
Canada Retail Singles (The Record)	20
El Salvador (UPI)	5
Europe (European Hot 100 Singles)	67
Netherlands (Dutch Top 40)	12
Netherlands (Single Top 100)	9
New Zealand (Recorded Music NZ)	16
UK Singles (Official Charts)	42
US Billboard Hot 100	5
US Dance Club Songs (Billboard)	1
US Dance Singles Sales (Billboard)	2
US Hot R&B/Hip-Hop Songs (Billboard)	1
US Cash Box Top 100	5

=== Year-end charts ===
Chart (1986)	Position
Netherlands (Single Top 100)	97

Chart (1987)	Position
US Billboard Hot 100	37
US Dance Club Songs (Billboard)	10
US Dance Singles Sales (Billboard)	9
US Hot R&B/Hip-Hop Songs (Billboard)	5

== Certifications ==
Region	Certification	Certified units/sales
United States (RIAA)	Gold	500,000^{^}
^{^} Shipments figures based on certification alone.
