= What Have You Done for Me Lately =

1986 single by Janet Jackson

Single by Janet Jackson

from the album Control
- B-side: "He Doesn't Know I'm Alive"; "Young Love"
- Released: January 13, 1986
- Recorded: September 1985
- Studio: Flyte Tyme, Minneapolis, Minnesota
- Genre: Dance-pop; funk; R&B
- Length: 4:59
- Label: A&M
- Songwriters: James Harris III; Terry Lewis; Janet Jackson
- Producer: Jimmy Jam and Terry Lewis

Janet Jackson singles chronology
"Fast Girls" (1984)	"What Have You Done for Me Lately" (1986)	"Nasty" (1986)

Music video
- "What Have You Done for Me Lately" on YouTube

"What Have You Done for Me Lately" is a song by American singer Janet Jackson from her third studio album, Control (1986). Jackson co-wrote the song with its producers Jimmy Jam and Terry Lewis. It was released January 13, 1986, by A&M Records as the album's lead single. After two unsuccessful albums and a management change, the singer began developing a new album. "What Have You Done for Me Lately" was penned for one of Jam and Lewis's own records, but the lyrics were rewritten to convey Jackson's feelings about her recent separation from James DeBarge in January 1985. It revolves around a woman's frustration with her partner in a relationship.

Critical reviews for "What Have You Done for Me Lately" were positive, with music critics believing it erased the former "pop-ingénue image" of Jackson's first two albums, reestablishing her as an "independent woman" figure. The song has been featured in critic lists as one of the greatest songs of all time and received a nomination for Best Rhythm & Blues Song at the 1987 Grammy Awards. The song peaked at number four on the US Billboard Hot 100 and was certified gold by the Recording Industry Association of America (RIAA). It also peaked at number two on the US Dance Club Songs and topped the US Hot Black Singles charts. Outside of the US, it topped the singles chart in the Netherlands and peaked within the top ten in Germany, Switzerland, and the United Kingdom.

The accompanying music video for "What Have You Done for Me Lately" was directed by Brian Jones and Piers Ashworth and choreographed by singer Paula Abdul. In it, Jackson goes to a diner with her friends to talk about her relationship problems. The video won a Soul Train Music Award for Best R&B/Soul or Rap Music Video in 1987. The song was first performed live by Jackson at the 29th annual Grammy Awards in 1987. She has also performed it live in each of her concert tours, beginning with the Rhythm Nation World Tour 1990 through the State of the World Tour (2017). It has been included in each of Jackson's greatest hits albums Design of a Decade: 1986–1996 (1995), Number Ones (2009), and Icon: Number Ones (2010). "What Have You Done for Me Lately" has been sampled and covered by various artists, and is also regarded as one of Jackson's signature songs which helped establish her as a known artist.

== Background ==
After arranging a recording contract with A&M Records in 1982 for a then sixteen-year-old Janet, her father Joseph Jackson oversaw the entire production of her debut album, Janet Jackson, and its follow-up, Dream Street (1984); the latter of which was written and produced by Jesse Johnson and Janet's brothers Marlon and Michael. Jackson was initially reluctant to begin a recording career, commenting, "I was coming off of a TV show that I absolutely hated doing, Fame. I didn't want to do [the first record, Janet Jackson]. I wanted to go to college. But I did it for my father ..." and elaborated that she was often in conflict with her producers. Amidst her professional struggles, she rebelled against her family's wishes by marrying James DeBarge of the family recording group DeBarge in 1984. The Jacksons disapproved of the relationship, citing DeBarge's immaturity and substance abuse. Jackson left her husband in January 1985 and was granted an annulment later that year.

Jackson subsequently fired her father as her manager and hired John McClain, then A&M Records' senior vice president of artists and repertoire and general manager. She also subsequently left the Jackson home in Encino, California, and moved into her own apartment around this time. Commenting on the decision, she stated, "I just wanted to get out of the house, get out from under my father, which was one of the most difficult things that I had to do, telling him that I didn't want to work with him again." Joseph Jackson resented John McClain for what he saw as an underhanded attempt to steal his daughter's career out from under him. McClain responded by saying "I'm not trying to pimp Janet Jackson or steal her away from her father." He subsequently introduced her to the songwriting and production duo James "Jimmy Jam" Harris III and Terry Lewis, former Prince associates and ex-members of The Time.

== Development and theme ==
Although Joseph Jackson initially demanded that his daughter's new album be recorded in Los Angeles so that he could keep an eye on her, Jam and Lewis refused. They required the entire production of the album to be done at their own studio in Minneapolis, Minnesota, "far from the glitter and distractions of Hollywood and the interference of manager-fathers." Control was recorded at Flyte Tyme Studios, the site for Flyte Tyme Records, founded by Jimmy Jam and Terry Lewis in Minneapolis. Jackson recorded the whole album, but A&M label executive and manager John McClain wanted one more uptempo song to compose the album. She then went back to Minneapolis to record one more track, titled "What Have You Done for Me Lately", which was originally penned for one of Jam and Lewis's own records. Jam remembered, "She was sitting outside in the lounge and said, 'Man, that's a funky track. Who's that for?' And we said, 'It's for you', and she said, 'Oh, cool'. I think she was very pleased when she heard the track".

The lyrics were rewritten to convey Jackson's feelings about her recent annulment from James DeBarge. It was the last song to be recorded for Control, and was ultimately chosen as the lead single for the album, as Jam and Lewis felt it best represented Jackson's outlook on life: "I think it was very representative of the sparseness and the funkiness that the rest of the album had and the attitude Janet had about being in control, being mature to the point where she had definite opinions about what she wanted to say". The song was inspired by one of her experiences in Minneapolis when a group of men made sexual advances towards her outside the hotel she resided at during the recording of Control. She recalled, "They were emotionally abusive. Sexually threatening. Instead of running to Jimmy or Terry for protection, I took a stand. I backed them down. That's how songs like 'Nasty' and 'What Have You Done for Me Lately' were born, out of a sense of self-defense."

== Composition ==
"What Have You Done for Me Lately"
22-second sample from the song's chorus.

Musically, "What Have You Done for Me Lately" is described as an uptempo dance song. It begins with a conversation with one of her friends, who asks Jackson the title question. Lyrically, it involves the singer asking why her lover was not as attentive as he once was. He was not treating her as well as he used to, and she calls him a "loser" in response. "I never ask for more than I deserve, you know it's the truth. You seem to think you're God's gift to this earth. I'm telling you no way", Jackson sings. Veda A. McCoy in the book Lifepower: Six Winning Strategies to a Life of Purpose, Passion & Power expressed that the song reminded that "life is about more than just what you say. Life is also about what you do". Vibe noted that with "What Have You Done for Me Lately", Jackson stands up to men. New York magazine's Chris Smith called the song's chorus "fully belligerent". In a Billboard publication, Nelson George noted its "taunting, tigerish" beat. Ed Gonzalez from Slant Magazine commented, "Nothing sends me into a trembling, corner-cowering stupor than a giggly, under-enunciated Janet Jackson jam."

== Critical reception ==
Critical reviews for "What Have You Done for Me Lately" were positive. Rolling Stone's Rob Hoerburger expressed that "What Have You Done for Me Lately" erased the former "pop-ingénue image" of Jackson's first two albums. According to William Ruhlmann of AllMusic, Jackson was an "aggressive, independent woman" on the song. Connie Johnson from the Los Angeles Times gave the song a positive review, emphasizing her "spunky authority". Eric Henderson of Slant Magazine praised the song, calling it "female-empowering" and wrote, "'What Have You Done for Me Lately' predates TLC's 'No Scrubs' by over a decade".

For Spin magazine's J.C. Stevenson, most of the album's power is in its dance floor authority, with songs such as "What Have You Done for Me Lately". Blues & Soul considered it "supreme in its execution". Nelson George in his book Post-Soul Nation: The Explosive, Contradictory, Triumphant, and Tragic 1980s called it an "instant dance anthem". Billboard and The Guardian both ranked the song number four on their lists of the greatest Janet Jackson songs. For the 29th annual Grammy Awards of 1987, "What Have You Done for Me Lately" received one nomination for Best Rhythm & Blues Song but lost to Anita Baker's "Sweet Love".

== Commercial performance ==
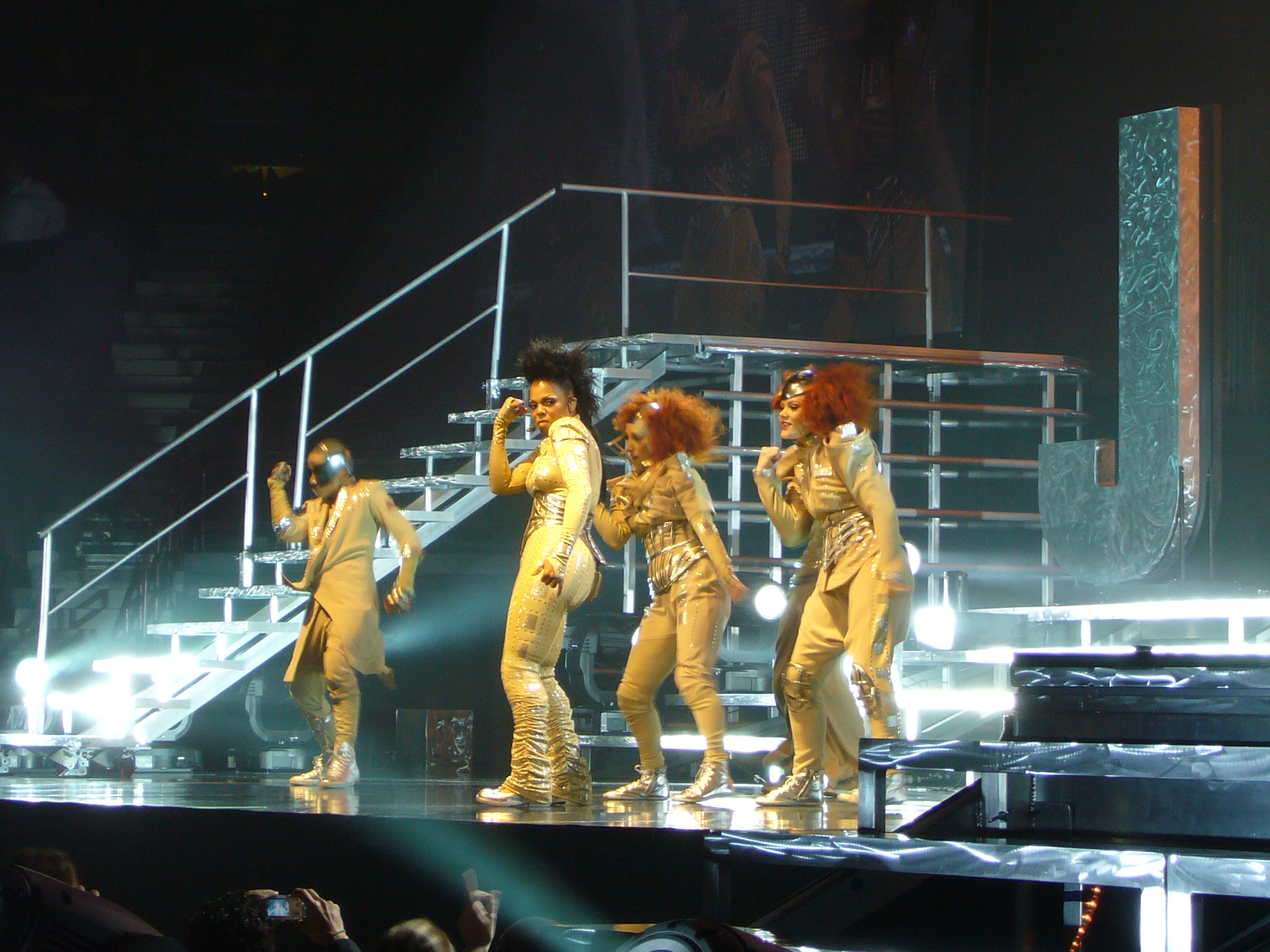
Jackson performing the song during the Rock Witchu Tour in 2008

"What Have You Done for Me Lately" debuted on the US Billboard Hot 100 at number 95 on the issue dated February 22, 1986, before peaking at number four on the issue dated May 17, 1986. It spent 21 weeks on the chart and became the first top ten single for Jackson. The song also reached numbers one and two on the Hot Black Singles and Hot Dance Club Songs charts, respectively. It was placed at number 43 on the Billboard Hot 100 year-end chart for 1986. On the Radio & Records Airplay chart the song debuted at number 37 on the March 21, 1986, issue. Five weeks later, it peaked at number eight, staying there for two weeks. It was in the top 10 of the chart for three weeks and remained on it for eleven. The song was certified gold by the Recording Industry Association of America (RIAA) for the shipments of 500,000 copies. In Canada, the single entered the RPM 100 Singles chart at number 92 on March 29, 1986. It peaked at number six on June 14, becoming Jackson's first top-10 entry and spending 24 weeks on the chart. It placed at position 53 on the RPM Year-end chart for 1986.

"What Have You Done for Me Lately" debuted on the UK Singles Chart at number 67 and peaked at number three on May 3, 1986. It spent 14 weeks on the chart and was certified silver by the British Phonographic Industry (BPI) for the shipments of 200,000 copies. In New Zealand, the song entered and peaked at number 27 on the New Zealand Singles Chart and spent nine weeks on the chart. In Australia, the song debuted at number 99 and peaked at number six on the Kent Music Report, the song spent a total of 17 weeks on the top 100 chart. In the Netherlands, the song became her first number-one single, topping the Dutch Top 40 for three weeks. Across Europe, the song reached the top 10 in Belgium, Germany, Ireland, and Switzerland.

== Music video ==
The accompanying music video for "What Have You Done for Me Lately" was directed by Brian Jones and Piers Ashworth and filmed in December 1985. The video's choreographer Paula Abdul, appears in the video as Jackson's friend. According to a Jet magazine publication in 1990, the video "combined sexual energy with classy, alluring moves. The combination propelled Janet into the classification of sexy superstar. Any who saw the videos witnessed the fact that Janet was, indeed, a full-grown woman." The video also featured Tina Landon who would later become Jackson's choreographer. Jackson shared in her book True You in 2011 that her recording company thought it was important that she appeared thinner in the video:

"I'd been told that my whole life, but at this critical juncture, with my career taking off, I didn't have the wherewithal to argue. [...] We [she and Paula Abdul] shared a house and spent weeks exercising [in Canyon Ranch]. [...] I was as motivated as ever to come out on top. [...] I felt good when it was over. I enjoyed the compliments about my "new" shape. I shot the video and did in fact reshape my image."

It premiered on BET on February 17, 1986. In the video, Jackson goes to a diner with her friends to talk about her relationship problems. Her boyfriend (played by then Rudy Houston, now Lana Houston) shows up with his friends, and Jackson decides to share her feelings about their relationship. In the video, Jackson's reality is a dark world with faded colors. In a more dreamscape world, the colors are vibrant and everything is 2D. The video won a Soul Train Music Award for Best R&B/Soul or Rap Music Video in 1987. While reviewing the video, Vanity Fair magazine said in 1986 that Jackson "might be Michael's androgynous twin in the sweep of her arm, the accusatory glare in her eyes, the collapsing diagonals of her dancing".

== Live performances ==
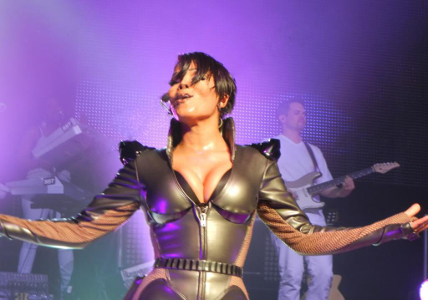
Jackson performing "What Have You Done for Me Lately" on the 2011 Number Ones: Up Close and Personal tour

Jackson performed "What Have You Done for Me Lately" on Soul Train on March 29, 1986. She also performed the song live at the 29th Annual Grammy Awards in 1987, wearing an all-black outfit, along with Jam and Lewis and dancers. She has also performed the song on all of her concert tours. On the 1990 Rhythm Nation 1814 Tour, it was the third song on the setlist. She performed the song with fellow dancers Tina Landon and Karen Owens, and was followed by a performance of "Let's Wait Awhile". On the Janet World Tour which happened in 1993 and continued throughout the two following years, the song was the second to be performed along with "Nasty", with the singer wearing gold jewelry. For Jon Pareles from The New York Times, Jackson was a stronger vocalist than she was when she was on the last tour. In "What Have You Done for Me Lately", she had new and syncopated vocals, which were different from the original song.

The song was performed during a "frenzied" medley of "Control", "The Pleasure Principle", and "Nasty" on The Velvet Rope Tour in 1998. The medley at the October 11, 1998, show at the Madison Square Garden in New York City was broadcast during a special titled The Velvet Rope: Live in Madison Square Garden by HBO. It was also added to the setlist at its DVD release, The Velvet Rope Tour: Live in Concert in 1999. During the All for You Tour in 2001 and 2002, "What Have You Done for Me Lately" was performed in a re-worked version, during a medley with "Control" and "Nasty". According to Denise Sheppard from Rolling Stone, it was "another crowd favorite; perhaps best dubbed as the 'bitter' portion of the night", also adding that "this performer - who has been performing onstage for twenty-eight years - knows what the crowd comes for and gives it to them in spades". The February 16, 2002 final date of the tour at the Aloha Stadium in Hawaii, was broadcast by HBO, and included a performance of it. This rendition was also added to the setlist at its DVD release, Janet: Live in Hawaii, in 2002. For her first tour in seven years Rock Witchu Tour in 2008, she chose to open the show a medley with "The Pleasure Principle", "Control" and "What Have You Done for Me Lately". After an interlude, Jackson made her entrance amid fireworks and theatrical smoke to perform the medley, while donning a Mohawk hairstyle.

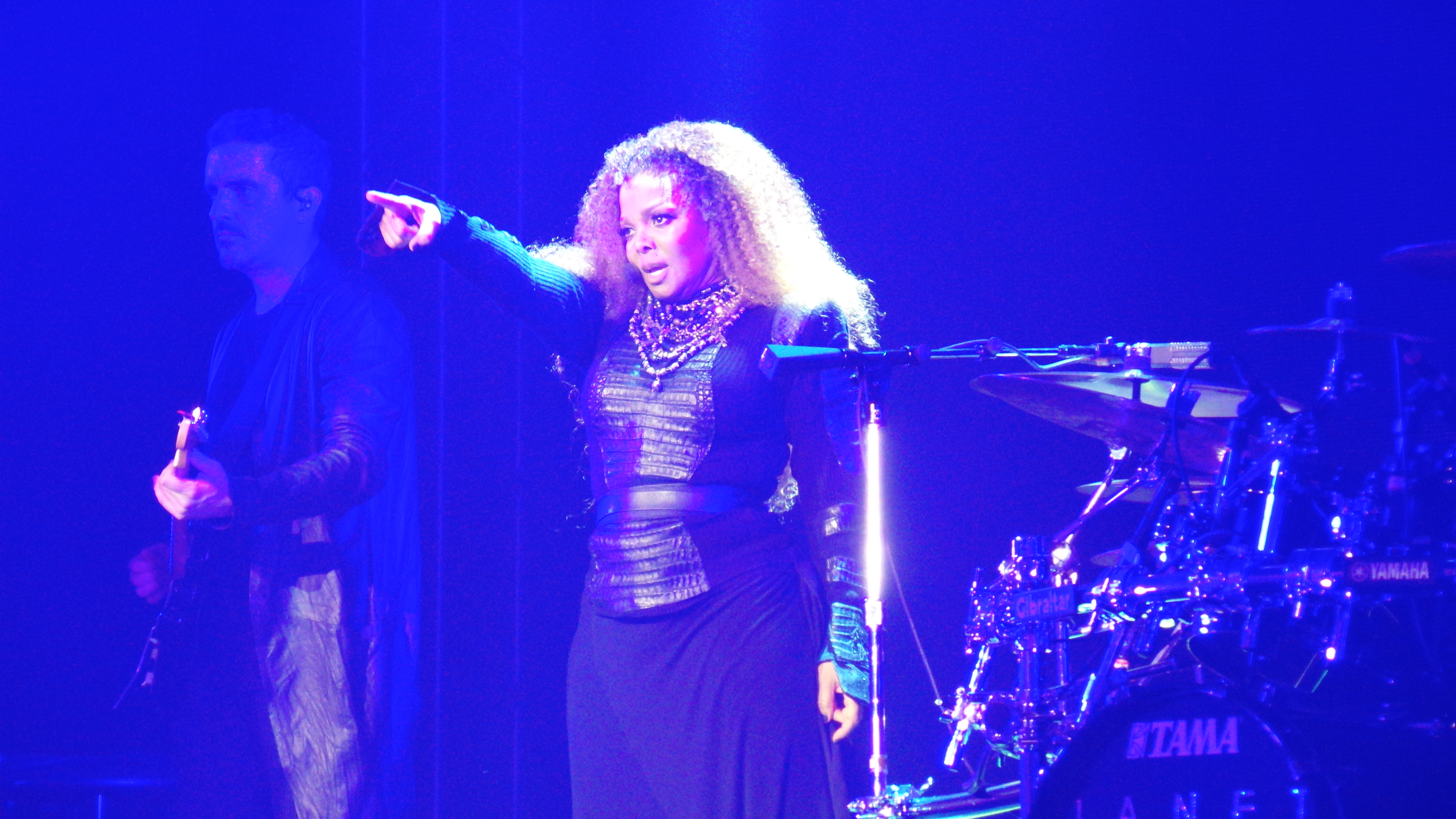
Jackson performing the song during her Unbreakable World Tour (2015–16)

While promoting her second greatest hits album Number Ones, the singer performed an eight-minute medley of six hits during the American Music Awards of 2009. It included "Control", "Miss You Much", "What Have You Done for Me Lately", "If", "Make Me", and finished with "Together Again". At the end of the performance, she received applause and a standing ovation from the audience. On the 2010 Essence Music Festival, held in New Orleans, Louisiana, Jackson included "What Have You Done for Me Lately" on the setlist, and performed wearing a one-piece outfit with leotards underneath. On the Number Ones: Up Close and Personal tour in 2011, the song was the third on the setlist. She performed it wearing a metallic catsuit. On August 30, the song was dedicated to Portland as a part of the tour which Jackson dedicated a song for the city she was performing. Writing for the Hartford Courant, Thomas Kintner pointed out that "six dancers joined [Jackson] to shimmy and gyrate through [...] the punchy 'What Have you Done for me Lately?'". The song was also included on Jackson's Unbreakable World Tour (2015–16). During the 2017-2019 State of the World Tour, it was performed interpolating Cardi B's "Bodak Yellow". Jackson included the song in concert at her 2019 Las Vegas residence Janet Jackson: Metamorphosis. It was also included on her special concert series "Janet Jackson: A Special 30th Anniversary Celebration of Rhythm Nation" in 2019.

== Use in media and legacy ==
"What Have You Done for Me Lately" is regarded as one of the singer's singles which helped establish her as a known artist. Upon its debut, it was compared favorably to similar recordings of female empowerment released by black women, such as "New Attitude" by Patti LaBelle, "Better Be Good to Me" by Tina Turner and "Sisters Are Doin' It for Themselves" by Aretha Franklin. Oprah Winfrey commented: "What you're seeing in all the areas of arts and entertainment is black women internalizing the idea of black power and pride ... Black women started listening to their inner cues, rather than society or even the black community's idea of what they are supposed to be and can be." It ranked number three hundred and forty-one on Blender's list of "The 500 Greatest Songs Since You Were Born". In 2012, Mike Staver wrote in Leadership Isn't for Cowards: How to Drive Performance by Challenging People that "'What Have You Done for Me Lately?' is not just some old Janet Jackson song, but a regular tune sung by leaders every day".

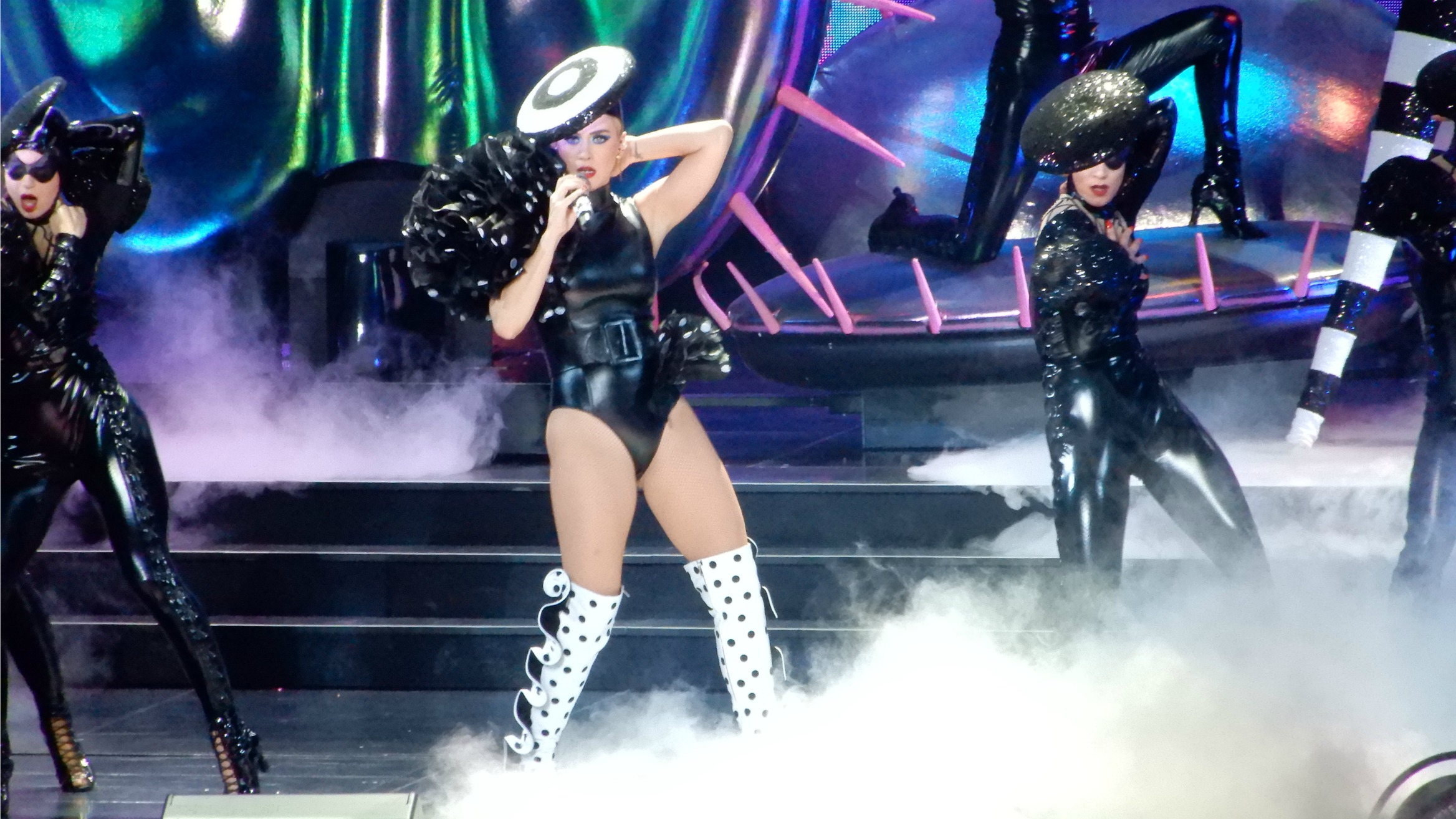
Katy Perry performing a snippet of "What Have You Done for Me Lately" during her Witness: The Tour at Madison Square Garden

"What Have You Done for Me Lately", in particular its title, was referenced in the 1987 film Eddie Murphy Raw, as a common question that women ask their partners prior to breaking up. It is featured in the 1989 made-for-television Disney film Parent Trap III, when Jessie (Monica Creel) embarrasses herself during a karaoke dance skit called "The Jackson Three", a parody of the Jackson Five, singing the song. American musician Prince started performing the track during his 1986 Parade tour stopping halfway through and asking the audience "Who wrote that?" then following up with his own "Controversy" track suggesting he did. He did it again during his 1990 Nude tour and during his shows in 2015 still stopping halfway through the song still asking "Who wrote this?". He performed "What Have You Done for Me Lately" again in late 2013 during shows in Uncasville, Connecticut. Jackson's sister La Toya Jackson sampled the song on her song "Wild Side" from her 1991 album No Relations. The song was interpolated for a medley sung in the 1993 comedy Sister Act 2: Back in the Habit, and was covered by the American soul and funk band Sharon Jones & The Dap-Kings in 2002 for their debut album, Dap Dippin' with Sharon Jones and the Dap-Kings. In 2017, singer-songwriter Katy Perry performed a medley of the song with her song "Bon Appétit" as part of her Witness: The Tour. In 2017, WWE color-commentator Corey Graves referenced this song in his commentary for the pre-show match between Mojo Rawley and Zack Ryder during Clash of Champions. Graves said "I'm not surprised you don't get it Zack [Ryder] this is a What Have You Done for Me Lately industry. What has Zack Ryder done for Mojo Rawley lately? Nothing!"

== Track listings ==
- Australian / US and Canadian 7-inch single

A. "What Have You Done for Me Lately" – 4:59
B. "He Doesn't Know I'm Alive" – 3:30

- Australian / Canadian / US and European 12-inch single

A1. "What Have You Done for Me Lately" (Extended Mix) – 7:00
B1. "What Have You Done for Me Lately" (Dub Version) – 6:35
B2. "What Have You Done for Me Lately" (A Cappella Version) – 2:19

- Canadian 12-inch single

A1. "What Have You Done for Me Lately" (Extended Mix) – 7:00
A2. "Nasty" (Extended) – 6:00
B1. "Nasty" (Instrumental) – 4:00
B2. "Nasty" (A Cappella) – 2:55

- UK 7-inch single

A. "What Have You Done for Me Lately" (Single Version) – 3:28
B. "Young Love" – 4:56

- UK 12-inch single

A1. "What Have You Done for Me Lately" (Extended Mix) – 7:00
B1 "What Have You Done for Me Lately" (Dub Version) – 6:35
B2. "Young Love" – 4:56

- European 7-inch single

A. "What Have You Done for Me Lately" (Single Version) – 3:28
B. "He Doesn't Know I'm Alive" – 3:30

== Credits and personnel ==
- Janet Jackson – lead vocals, background vocals, songwriter, synthesizer, co-producer, rhythm and vocal arranger
- Jimmy Jam – producer, songwriter, synthesizer, synthesizer programming, digital sampling, percussion, acoustic piano, background vocals, rhythm and vocal arranger, assistant engineer
- Terry Lewis – producer, songwriter, drum programming, percussion, background vocals, rhythm and vocal arranger, recording engineer
- Melanie Andrews – background vocals
- Steve Hodge – recording engineer, mixing

Credits adapted from the liner notes of Control.

== Charts ==
=== Weekly charts ===
Chart (1986)	Peak position
Australia (Kent Music Report)	6
Belgium (Ultratop 50 Flanders)	7
Canada Top Singles (RPM)	6
Canada Retail Singles (The Record)	2
El Salvador (UPI)	10
Europe (European Hot 100 Singles)	9
Guatemala (UPI)	2
Ireland (IRMA)	10
Luxembourg (Radio Luxembourg)	2
Netherlands (Dutch Top 40)	1
Netherlands (Single Top 100)	3
New Zealand (Recorded Music NZ)	27
South Africa (Springbok Radio)	19
Switzerland (Schweizer Hitparade)	9
UK Singles (Official Charts)	3
US Billboard Hot 100	4
US Adult Contemporary (Billboard)	38
US Dance Club Songs (Billboard)	2
US Dance Singles Sales (Billboard)	1
US Hot R&B/Hip-Hop Songs (Billboard)	1
US Cash Box Top 100	5
West Germany (GfK)	8
Zimbabwe (ZIMA)	1

=== Year-end charts ===
Chart (1986)	Position
Australia (Kent Music Report)	61
Belgium (Ultratop 50 Flanders)	18
Canada Top Singles (RPM)	53
Europe (European Hot 100 Singles)	81
Netherlands (Dutch Top 40)	22
Netherlands (Single Top 100)	39
UK Singles (Official Charts Company)	60
US Billboard Hot 100	43
US Dance Club Songs (Billboard)	28
US Dance Singles Sales (Billboard)	21
US Black Singles (Billboard)	13
US Cash Box Top 100	59

== Certifications ==
Region	Certification	Certified units/sales
Canada (Music Canada)	Gold	50,000^{^}
United Kingdom (BPI)	Silver	252,000
United States (RIAA)	Gold	500,000^{^}
^{^} Shipments figures based on certification alone.

== See also ==
- List of number-one R&B singles of 1986 (U.S.)
