= Two to the Power of Love =

Single by Janet Jackson and Cliff Richard

from the album Dream Street
- Released: September 17, 1984 (UK)
- Recorded: April 26, 1984
- Studio: Advision (London)
- Genre: Pop; R&B
- Length: 3:06
- Label: A&M AM210
- Songwriters: Peter Beckett; Steven A. Kipner
- Producers: Giorgio Moroder; Pete Bellotte

Janet Jackson singles chronology
"Don't Stand Another Chance" (1984)	"Two to the Power of Love" (1984)	"Fast Girls" (1984)

Cliff Richard singles chronology
"Baby You're Dynamite"/"Ocean Deep" (1984)	"Two to the Power of Love" (1984)	"Shooting from the Heart" (1984)

"Two to the Power of Love" is a duet between Janet Jackson and Cliff Richard and was the second single released from Dream Street. It peaked at No. 83 in the United Kingdom and No. 7 in South Africa. This was Jackson's first single to enter the top 100 and top 10 of those countries respectively.

Jackson performed the song with Jesse Borrego in season four of the television series Fame.

== Track listing and formats ==
- UK 7" vinyl single

A: "Two to the Power of Love" (with Cliff Richard) – 3:06
B: "Rock 'N' Roll" – 4:10

- UK 12" vinyl single

A: "Two to the Power of Love" (with Cliff Richard) – 3:06
B1: "Rock 'N' Roll" – 4:10
B2: "Don't Mess Up This Good Thing" – 3:53

- Japan 7" vinyl single

A: "Two to the Power of Love" (with Cliff Richard) – 3:06
B: "Dream Street" – 3:52

== Charts ==
Chart (1984)	Peak position
UK Singles (OCC)	83
South Africa (RISA)	7
