= Dream Street (Janet Jackson album) =

Studio album by Janet Jackson
- Released: September 3, 1984
- Recorded: 1984
- Studios: Soundcastle; Can-Am (Los Angeles); American Artists (Minneapolis); Capitol (Hollywood)
- Genres: Pop; synth-pop; bubblegum pop; soft pop; R&B
- Length: 37:45
- Label: A&M
- Producers: Marlon Jackson; Jesse Johnson; Giorgio Moroder; Pete Bellotte

Janet Jackson chronology
Janet Jackson (1982)	Dream Street (1984)	Control (1986)

Singles from Dream Street
- 1. "Don't Stand Another Chance" Released: August 13, 1984; 2. "Two to the Power of Love" Released: September 17, 1984 (UK); 3. "Fast Girls" Released: November 1984

Dream Street is the second studio album by American singer Janet Jackson, released in September 1984, by A&M Records. More pop than her debut album's "bubblegum soul" feel, the album was not the runaway success that Janet's father Joe thought it would be, peaking at No. 147 on the Billboard 200 in 1984. The album did have one modest hit for Jackson, the Top 10 R&B single, "Don't Stand Another Chance", produced by brother Marlon. Also, the video for the song "Dream Street", Jackson's first music video, was shot during the shooting of the TV show Fame.

== Critical reception ==
Professional ratings
Review scores
Source	Rating
AllMusic	3/5 stars
The Encyclopedia of Popular Music	3/5 stars
The Philadelphia Inquirer	2/4 stars
The Rolling Stone Album Guide	2.5/5 stars

Ed Hogan with AllMusic commented retrospectively: "A listen to Janet Jackson's Dream Street brings to mind remembrances of the then-teenaged singer's appearances on American Bandstand [...] The first single, "Don't Stand Another Chance", was a family affair, produced by brother Marlon Jackson with vocal ad-libs by Michael Jackson. It was a Top Ten R&B hit during the summer of 1984. The extended 12" mix rocks, showcasing outstanding synth work by John Barnes. Other standouts are the smeary Minneapolis funk cut "Pretty Boy" produced by Jesse Johnson, and both "Hold Back the Tears" and "If It Takes All Night" are prime examples of pleasing '80s pop."

Ken Tucker with The Philadelphia Inquirer gave it a "fair" rating, calling it "A small but pleasant surprise: The Jacksons' youngest sister has come up with a more consistently entertaining album than her brothers' Victory record. Most Dream Street songs have a glossy pop sheen, and Janet's duet with English pop star Cliff Richard, "Two to the Power of Love", is catchy, if totally forgettable. Most of the time Janet favors slick disco rhythms that are easy to listen to."

== Commercial performance ==
Dream Street sold 21,000 copies between 1991 and November 2006 according to Nielsen Soundscan, while its sales through the BMG Music Club stand at 44,000 as of 2003. The album peaked at 147 in the United States and failed to chart internationally.

Dream Street is both the lowest charting studio album of Janet Jackson's career in the US, and her only studio album to not have any songs appear on the Billboard Hot 100 chart.

== Track listing ==
No.	Title	Writer(s)	Producer(s)	Length
1.	"Don't Stand Another Chance"	Marlon Jackson; John Barnes	M. Jackson	4:14
2.	"Two to the Power of Love" (with Cliff Richard)	Peter Beckett; Steven A. Kipner	Giorgio Moroder; Peter Bellotte	3:06
3.	"Pretty Boy"	Jesse Johnson	Johnson	6:32
4.	"Dream Street"	Arthur Barrow; John Philip Shenale; Pete Bellotte	Moroder; Bellotte	3:52
5.	"Communication"	Paul Bliss	Moroder; Bellotte	3:12
6.	"Fast Girls"	Johnson	Johnson	3:18
7.	"Hold Back the Tears"	Chris Eaton	Moroder; Bellotte	3:14
8.	"All My Love to You"	M. Jackson; Anthony Patler	M. Jackson	5:44
9.	"If It Takes All Night"	David P. Bryant; Jay Gruska	Moroder; Bellotte	4:09
Total length:				37:21

B-sides
No.	Title	Writer(s)	Producer(s)	Length
1.	"Rock 'n' Roll" (B-side to "Don't Stand Another Chance")	M. Jackson	M. Jackson	4:10
2.	"French Blue" (B-side to "Fast Girls")	Johnson	Johnson	6:22

The song, called "Start Anew", was written for the album by Ralph McCarthy and Yuji Toriyama, but was not included on the track list. It was released as an off-album single in Japan on July 25, 1985, with the B-sides "Hold Back the Tears" (7") and an extended version (12"). The song was later included on the Japanese edition of Control.

== Charts ==
Chart (1984)	Peak position
US Billboard 200	147
US Top R&B/Hip-Hop Albums (Billboard)	19
US Cash Box Top 200 Albums	147
US Cash Box Black Contemporary Top 75	33

== Personnel ==
Adapted from AllMusic.

- Janet Jackson – duet, lead vocals
- Beth Andersen – background vocals
- John Barnes – associate producer, drum programming, keyboards, Moog bass, Moog synthesizer, programming, rhythm arrangements
- Arthur Barrow – arranger, bass guitar, keyboards
- Steve Bates – engineer
- Chuck Beeson – art direction
- Pete Bellotte – producer
- Bill Bottrell – engineer, mixing
- Sam Emerson – inlay photography, photography
- Dino Espinosa – background vocals
- Michael Espinosa – background vocals
- Tito Espinosa – background vocals
- Gary Falcone – background vocals
- Mitchell Froom – arranger, keyboards
- Brian Gardner – mastering
- Steve Hodge – engineer
- Jackie Jackson – background vocals
- Marlon Jackson – drum programming, drums, producer, programming, rhythm, rhythm arrangements, background vocals
- Michael Jackson – background vocals
- Tito Jackson – background vocals
- Jesse Johnson – producer
- Marva King – background vocals
- Harry Langdon – cover photo
- Peter Martinsen – engineer, mixing, remixing
- Peggy McCreary – mixing
- Jonathan Moffett – drums
- Giorgio Moroder – producer
- Melanie Nissen – design
- Cecille Parker – stylist
- Anthony Patler – keyboards, rhythm, rhythm arrangements
- Greg Phillinganes – keyboards, Moog bass, Moog synthesizer
- Joe Pizzulo – background vocals
- Brian Reeves – mixdown engineer, mixing
- Cliff Richard – duet, vocals
- John Philip Shenale – arranger, keyboards
- Jeremy Smith – engineer, mixing
- Julia Tillman Waters – background vocals
- Maxine Willard Waters – background vocals
- Richie Zito – guitar
