= Dammn Baby =

Single by Janet Jackson

from the album Unbreakable
- Released: May 4, 2016
- Studio: Flyte Tyme Studios (Agoura Hills, CA); The Cadillac Castle (Century City, CA)
- Genre: R&B; dance-pop
- Length: 3:55
- Label: Rhythm Nation; BMG
- Songwriters: Janet Jackson; James Harris III; Terry Lewis; Dwayne Abernathy
- Producers: Janet Jackson; Jimmy Jam and Terry Lewis; Dem Jointz

Janet Jackson singles chronology
"Unbreakable" (2015)	"Dammn Baby" (2016)	"Made for Now" (2018)

Music video
- "Dammn Baby" on YouTube

"Dammn Baby" is a single by American singer-songwriter Janet Jackson. It was released on May 4, 2016, as the third and final single from her eleventh studio album Unbreakable (2015). It was co-written and produced by Jackson and her long-time collaborators Jimmy Jam and Terry Lewis, with additional songwriting and production contributions by Dem Jointz. The official music video was released on YouTube, on May 4, 2016. The single subsequently debuted on the US Billboard Adult R&B Songs chart at number 20 and later peaked at number eight, becoming the album's third consecutive top ten single on the chart, after "No Sleeep" and "Unbreakable".

== Background ==
After a period of hiatus and numerous rumours about whether she was recording a new album or not, Janet Jackson officially announced her return on May 16, 2015. Jackson announced she had founded her own label, Rhythm Nation, becoming the first African-American female recording artist to do so, while also planning the album to be distributed by BMG, as well as preparing herself for a new world tour in the same year. During the video announcement, an instrumental of the album's first single, "No Sleeep", was previewed, and later the full song was released on June 22, 2015. A week earlier, she also announced that her world tour was called Unbreakable World Tour, and on August 20, 2015, while revealing lyrics of the song "The Great Forever", it was confirmed that Unbreakable was also the album's title. On September 3, 2015, its track list was revealed, with a song titled "Dammn Baby" being one of the seventeen tracks on the album. The song was produced by longtime collaborators Jimmy Jam and Terry Lewis, and was the first collaboration between them in nearly a decade. "Dammn Baby" was final song completed during sessions in 2015. Jackson was already working with choreographers and dancers at the studio when she told the producers, "You know, it would be cool to have one more uptempo funky record that I can really dance to", and the result was "Dammn Baby".

== Composition ==
"Dammn Baby" was written and produced by Janet Jackson, Dem Jointz, and Jimmy Jam and Terry Lewis. It has hints of trap bass and percussion, and an interpolation of "I Get Lonely", a single from her sixth studio album The Velvet Rope, into its breakdown, in which Jackson repeats the phrase "gonna break it down, break it down". Chris Ingalls from PopMatters described it as a "R&B dance groove" with female vocals cooing "dammn, dammn" over the beats. According to PopCrush's Bradley Stern, "Dammn Baby" "blends in slick synths and DJ Mustard-esque beats" for a "solid, motivational groove", while referencing to the singer's own originality: "Can't nobody tell you what you can't do, shut that down automatic / And I guarantee they'll all fall in line". Jackson also sings, "It's all about love" / And how we ain’t gonna never let words get in the way". Anupa Mistry of Pitchfork said that the "lazy bass and airy vocals" of "Dammn Baby" sounded like "Tinashe-meets-Teena Marie".

== Critical reception ==
Desiree O from Brit + Co website gave the song a positive review, saying that "with shades of the signature Jackson sound, a totally fun beat and a chilled-out breakdown mid-song, this could very well be your fave jam of the summer. When you hear Janet’s final "dammn" at the end, you’ll be hooked!". Saeed Saeed from The National deemed it "irresistibly funky with its super-fat bass lines". Alex Macpherson from The Guardian simply said "The chunky bass of Dammn Baby hits the dancefloor spot". Rob Tannenbaum from Billboard magazine noted that "Dammn Baby" and another song on the album, "2 B Loved", were "pretty explicit nods to DJ Mustard's "ratchet" sound". PopMatters' Evan Sawdey shared a similar sentiment, saying "the excellent and not-misspelled" song "betters DJ Mustard as his own low-end synth game", although he noted that the song's breakdown was "pure Janet". Michael Arceneaux of Complex opined that he was more partial to songs like "Dammn Baby", "Dream Maker/Euphoria", "No Sleeep" and "Night". In a more balanced review, AllMusic's Andy Kellman noted that the song's "probing synthesizers, booming bass, and relatively detached vocal" came across as "conscious concessions to commercial radio". In a separate review, Emannuel Elone from PopMatters website was critical of "I Get Lonely"'s interpolation, saying the idea was "cute", but not enough to "lift this song up quality-wise to where it should be".

== Chart performance ==
"Dammn Baby" debuted on the US Billboard Adult R&B Songs chart at number 20 and later peaked at number eight, becoming the album's third consecutive top ten single on the chart, after "No Sleeep" and "Unbreakable".

== Music video ==
An accompanying music video for "Dammn Baby" was directed by Dave Meyers and choreographed by Gil Duldulao, Jackson's longtime choreographer, Luther Brown and Denzel Chisolm in a location outside Los Angeles, California. It was released through her Twitter page, at the midnight of May 4, 2016, amid reports that she was expecting her first child and after teasing GIF images of a new video on social media. The black-and-white video shows Jackson and her dancers in a choreography routine. According to MTV, the singer is "decked out in a latex and leather getup complete with flared combat boots like she's ready to hop onboard the Serenity at any moment". The Fader's Ben Dandridge-Lemco commented that the video "features classic group choreography, some more abstract solo steps from Jackson during the breakdown, and interesting uses of lighting all around". Carey O'Donnell from Paper deemed it "a doozy of a video", while also noting that the "icon busts some seriously stellar dance moves, and shows us her prowess is utterly timeless". i-D magazine said the video was "classic Janet -- breathy percussion, whispered lyrics and body popping video". Hot Press noted that it had a "true Single Ladies vibe". Rachel Sonis from Idolator said that the black-and-white feel of the video was "very reminiscent of the visual for her 1989 hit 'Rhythm Nation'", while Hayden Wright from Radio.com website noted that the video "takes a monochromatic cue from past videos like 'Scream' (which she shot with her late brother Michael) and 'Rhythm Nation'".

== Live performance ==
Jackson performed "Dammn Baby" on her 2017 State of the World Tour, later transitioning to the song it interpolates, "I Get Lonely".

== Charts ==
Chart (2016)	Peak position
US Adult R&B Songs (Billboard)	8
