= Burnitup! =

2015 single by Janet Jackson

Promotional single by Janet Jackson featuring Missy Elliott

from the album Unbreakable
- Released: September 25, 2015
- Studio: Flyte Tyme Studios (Agoura Hills, CA); The Cadillac Castle (Century City, CA)
- Genre: Dance
- Length: 4:09
- Label: Rhythm Nation; BMG
- Songwriters: Janet Jackson; James Harris III; Terry Lewis; Dwayne Abernathy; Melissa Elliott
- Producers: Janet Jackson; Jimmy Jam and Terry Lewis; Dem Jointz; Missy Elliott

"Burnitup!" (stylized as "BURNITUP!") is a song by American singer Janet Jackson featuring rapper Missy Elliott recorded for Jackson's eleventh studio album, Unbreakable (2015). It was written and produced by Jackson, Dem Jointz, Jimmy Jam and Terry Lewis and Elliott. The song marked the fourth time Jackson and Elliott collaborated. "Burnitup!" was released as a promotional single from the album on September 25, 2015, while a digital promo single containing the album's version and a radio edit was released on October 5, 2015 by Rhythm Nation Records and BMG Rights Management.

The dance song contains electronic beats, processed vocal samples, crisp house drums, glossy keys and thick synth-bass in its instrumentation. Lyrically, the song finds Jackson promising to "dance like no one's watching" and "show you how to burn it up", while Elliott hypes the crowd. The song received positively from music critics, who praised the song for being a club-ready track and very energetic. "Burnitup!" charted within the top 20 on the US R&B Songs chart. It was performed on Jackson's 2015–16 Unbreakable World Tour and on her 2017-2019 State of the World Tour.

== Background and release ==
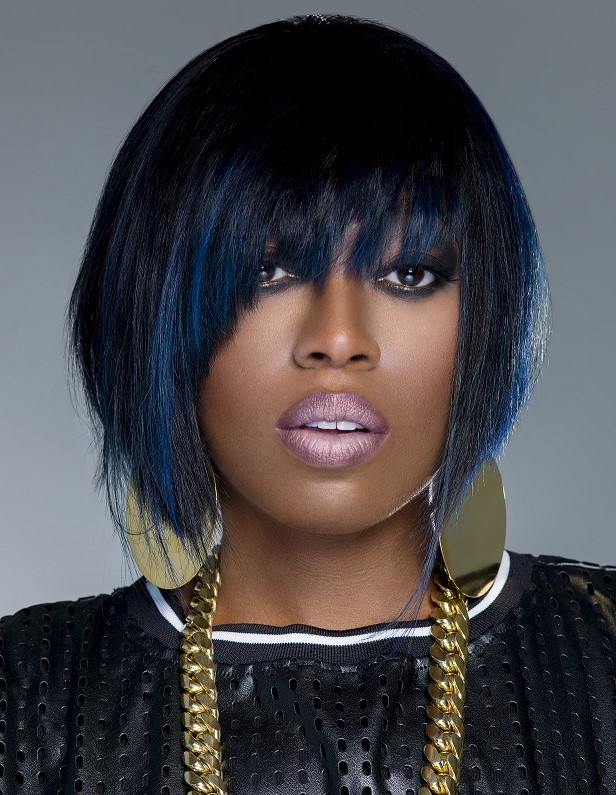
"Burnitup!" serves as the fourth collaboration between Jackson and Elliott (pictured).

For "Burnitup!", Jackson invited American rapper Missy Elliott, with whom she had previously collaborated several times. The first was on 1998 remixes of "Go Deep", the second in 2001 on a remix of "Son of a Gun" from All for You (2001), and the last on "The 1" from Discipline (2008). Elliott commented:

Working with Janet is unbelievable. Although we are great friends and have been for so long, I am still her biggest fan. Sometimes, I still have to pinch myself when I call her and she picks up the phone or texts me because she is still Janet Jackson! The superstar that I would run to the TV to watch her videos and dance moves, so for me I'm honored to be on any Janet record. I'm humbled whenever she asks because she inspires and continues to inspire me, always!

Jackson responded that it is always great to work with friends, and Elliott was a dear one. It was natural to record a song together for both of them, as they had a great time doing it. The song's producers, Jimmy Jam and Terry Lewis, said that "Janet and Missy working together is a case of one plus one equaling 10." The song was first played on MistaJam's BBC Radio 1 show on September 24, 2015, and then released for digital download the day after. A promotional digital single containing the album's version and a radio edit of the song was released on October 5, 2015.

== Composition ==
"Burnitup!" was written and produced by Janet Jackson, Dem Jointz, Jimmy Jam and Terry Lewis and Missy Elliott. It also features Elliott as a rap guest. It is composed as an uptempo dance song with electronic beats, processed vocal samples, "crisp" house drums, "glossy" keys and "thick" synth-bass. The opening of "Burnitup!" warns listeners with a voice shouting "Incoming!", before Elliott starts rapping, and hypes listeners up before Jackson's vocals and makes some kitty-quoting "meow" sounds. Jackson then asks "Mr. DJ" to "turn it up" and the crowd to "dance like no-one's watching", while Elliott raps "Make it work, make it work, make it work". Elliott also instructs the listener, rapping "Dis dat jam, now do yo dance[sic]" and giving shout-outs to Jackson, who teases "Just give me that fire and Imma show you how to burn it up".

== Critical reception ==
"Burnitup!" received positive reviews from music critics. Billboard's Colin Stutz called it a "club-ready jam", while Shenequa Golding from Vibe noted that "Missy infuses her signature personality on the electronic single, while Janet's smooth voices coats the fast-paced track". Alex Hudson of Exclaim commented that Elliott, combined with the song's "thumping electronic swagger and DJ-encouraging melodies", makes it an energetic pop anthem. Francesca Dunn from i-D complimented Jackson's "joyously hooky vocals" which she displayed around the track. Spin magazine's Brennan Carley noted that "heel-nipping track featuring Missy Elliott [who is] in fine form, doing a tongue-twisting verse to usher in Jackson's perfectly aerated harmonizing". Maeve McDermott from USA Today was positive, saying "Ms. Jackson doesn't just make music for the bedroom—Burnitup! seems tailor-made for booming club speakers, all anchored by drill-sergeant rapping from—yes, she's baaaack!—Missy". James Vincent, writer for The Verge, noted that both artists featured on the song have been relatively absent from the music world for a while, and "Burnitup!" shows why it is good to have them back.

Andy Kellman of AllMusic picked the track as one of the best on the album, noting that it serves to "increase the intensity and anticipation, [...] a simultaneously hard and light dance track with Missy Elliott hyping the crowd", Glenn Gamboa of Newsday called it "a hard-hitting dance floor delight, alternating stretches of smooth soul and thudding beats, not to mention Elliott's charming cameo." Mof Gimmers of The Quietus named it a "high profile track", while Mikael Wood of Los Angeles Times labeled it "a boisterous duet with Missy Elliott." Evan Sawdey of PopMatters praised "Jackson's musings [for] never ris[ing] above generic will.i.am-styled vagueries." Michael Arceneaux of Complex applauded the track for "just mak[ing] you happy to hear Janet's voice—with the just as musically missed Missy Elliott, no less—on an uptempo track." Lucas Villa of AXS opined that "it's refreshing to hear Janet reclaim the throne and rekindle her love for the club. "BURNITUP!" is a hot-and-heavy return to form for Ms. Jackson." In contrast, Annie Zaleski wrote for The A.V. Club that the song "doesn't quite overcome dated-sounding production and overly generic exhortations about DJs and dancing."

== Chart performance ==
"Burnitup!" debuted at number 24 on the US R&B Songs, while peaking at number 17 the week after. The song also charted within the top three on the Bubbling Under R&B/Hip-Hop Songs chart. It also reached number 68 in Belgium's Flanders region.

== Live performances ==
"Burnitup!" was performed as the opening number on Jackson's 2015–16 Unbreakable World Tour with Elliott appearing on the screens. The song was added to the setlist of the 2017-2019 State of the World Tour, with Elliott and Jackson performing it for the first time together on December 17, 2017, for the tour's final stop of the first leg at the Philips Arena in Atlanta, Georgia.

== Credits and personnel ==
Credits for "Burnitup!" adapted from Unbreakable liner notes.

- Janet Jackson – vocals, songwriting, producing
- Melissa Elliott – vocals, songwriting, producing, recording
- James Harris III – songwriting, producing, all instruments
- Terry Lewis – songwriting, producing, all instruments
- Dwayne Abernathy – songwriting, producing, keys, mixing
- Serban Ghenea – mixing
- Matthew Marrin – recording
- John Hanes – mixing engineer

== Charts ==
Chart (2015)	Peak position
Belgium (Ultratip Bubbling Under Flanders)	68
Japan Hot 100 (Billboard)	16
UK Indie (Official Charts)	48
US Bubbling Under R&B/Hip-Hop Songs (Billboard)	3
US R&B Songs (Billboard)	17

== Release history ==
Region	Date	Format	Label	Ref.
Worldwide	September 25, 2015	Digital download	Rhythm Nation; BMG	
Europe	October 5, 2015	Promotional single	Rhythm Nation; BMG	
