= State of the World Tour =

2017–19 concert tour by Janet Jackson

- Tour by Janet Jackson
- Location: Asia; North America
- Associated album: Unbreakable
- Start date: September 7, 2017
- End date: April 7, 2019
- Legs: 3
- No. of shows: 79
- Attendance: 456,633 (first leg, with 56 shows)
- Box office: US$44.6 million ($57.28 million in 2024 dollars)

Janet Jackson concert chronology
- Unbreakable World Tour (2015–2016); State of the World Tour (2017–2019); Janet Jackson: Metamorphosis (2019)

The State of the World Tour was the eighth concert tour by American singer Janet Jackson. Launched in promotion of her eleventh studio album Unbreakable (2015), the tour is produced by Live Nation and is under the creative direction of Gil Duldulao. Announced in May 2017 as a 56-city North American trek visiting the United States and Canada, it is a continuation of the Unbreakable World Tour, which was postponed in 2016 due to Jackson's pregnancy. Tickets originally purchased for the Unbreakable World Tour were honored with new concert dates under the revamped State of the World Tour.

The theme of the tour was altered to reflect socially conscious messages from Jackson's entire music catalog. The revised name of the tour is taken from her 1991 single "State of the World", released from her fourth studio album Janet Jackson's Rhythm Nation 1814 (1989). The tour was advertised on social media with socially conscious lyrics quoted from studio albums Rhythm Nation 1814, Janet (1993), The Velvet Rope (1997) and Unbreakable. A number of songs selected for the concert set list, along with corresponding imagery depicted on stage, address racism, white supremacy, homophobia, fascism, xenophobia, domestic violence, and police brutality.

The first concert took place on September 7, 2017, in Lafayette, Louisiana at the Cajundome arena. Proceeds from the September 9, 2017 concert at the Toyota Center in Houston, Texas were donated to relief efforts supporting evacuees of Hurricane Harvey; Jackson met with Houston mayor Sylvester Turner and evacuees at the George R. Brown Convention Center prior to the performance. The first leg of the tour concluded with a concert at the Philips Arena in Atlanta, Georgia on December 17, 2017.

== Background ==
On May 1, 2017, Jackson announced a massive North American trek to reschedule her Unbreakable World Tour that was postponed due to the singer's pregnancy, with Jackson set to embark on a rebranded trek starting in September. Tickets from the postponed Unbreakable Tour gigs will be honored at the new dates, while newly scheduled stops going on sale, beginning May 5, 2017, at Live Nation.

== Concert synopsis ==
The concert opens with a video reel denouncing white supremacy, right-wing extremism, domestic terrorism and police brutality. Names of unarmed black men killed by police which drew national attention with the Black Lives Matter movement, as well as the deadly violence surrounding the 2017 Unite the Right rally in Charlottesville, Virginia were depicted in the video. As Jordan Darville of The Fader observes: "The one-minute video introduction starts by naming unarmed black men who were killed by police officers: Eric Garner, Michael Brown, and Jonathan Ferrell. Then, we hear audio clips of television personalities and protestors explaining the threats of white supremacy, privilege, and inequality. The message is a vital one: The Center for Investigative reporting has shared an analysis of domestic terrorism in the United States spanning nine years, and found that right-wing extremists were responsible for twice as many violent attacks compared to Islamic extremists."

The tour marks the first time non-single songs from earlier albums such as "The Body That Loves You" (from the Janet album), "Spending Time With You", and "Island Life" (both from the Damita Jo album) were performed live, alongside the first performance of 1995 single "Twenty Foreplay" (from the Design of a Decade: 1986–1996 album) and the first time "Where Are You Now", "New Agenda", "What About", "The Knowledge", "State of the World", and "Someone To Call My Lover" were performed since their respective album's tours. Also, songs from the "Unbreakable" album were performed for the first time, such as "Black Eagle", "Dammn Baby", and "Well Travelled". On October 8, 2017, Jackson welcomed back several former dancers to appear during the performance of "Rhythm Nation" at the Hollywood Bowl.

The 2018 leg of the show also saw another revision to the setlist, adding first-ever performances of "The Skin Game (Part 1)" (a B-side to the "Come Back To Me" single), "Feels So Right" and "Truth" (from All for You), and her 1998 collaboration with Busta Rhymes, "What It's Gonna Be". Additionally, songs Jackson left out of her shows for years, such as "Runaway", "When We Oooo", "Doesn't Really Matter", "Funny How Time Flies (When You're Having Fun)", "So Much Betta", and "You Ain't Right", are part of the setlist.

== Commercial reception ==
According to StubHub, the State of the World Tour ranks as one of the top 10 most in-demand concert tours for the fall of 2017.

At the end of 2017, the tour placed at number 62 on Pollstar's "2017 Year-End Top 100 Worldwide Tours" list, grossing $33.4 million from 56 shows with a total attendance of 456,633. At the end of 2018, the tour placed at number 108 on Pollstar's "2018 Year-End Top 200 North American Tours" list, grossing $11.2 million from 14 shows (not including her festival appearances) with an average gross of $448,030. Also, Jackson co-headlined Outside Lands Music Festival in San Francisco, California, it was the highest grossing music festival of 2018, grossing over $27.7 million.

== Critical reception ==
The tour opened to positive critical reception, with several commentators praising Jackson's post-pregnancy physical fitness, showmanship and socially conscious messages. Her emotional rendition of "What About", a song concerning domestic violence originally recorded for The Velvet Rope, drew media attention highlighting her recent separation from her third husband Wissam Al Mana; Jackson's brother Randy alleges she suffered verbal abuse by Al Mana which contributed to the breakdown of their marriage.

In his review for the Houston Chronicle, Joey Guerra wrote that "Janet Jackson is at her absolute best, and largely unparalleled in pop music, when she funnels direct, declarative messages into her songs", citing numerous hits from her catalog. He considered "Rhythm Nation" a highlight of the show, which "resonates even more today in a world seemingly gone mad[.]" Brandon Caldwell of the Houston Press reported that Jackson's denouncement of police brutality and white supremacy, as well as her dance-driven classic hits elated the crowd. "For two hours on Saturday night," he wrote, "it felt right to go through the eras with Janet. The liberating janet. years, the rhythm-driven arcs of Control and even the current Unbreakable album."

== Set list ==
This set list is representative of the show on September 7, 2017, in Lafayette, Louisiana. It does not represent all concerts for the duration of the tour.

1. "The Knowledge"
2. "State of the World"
3. "Burnitup!"
4. "Nasty"
5. "Feedback"
6. "Miss You Much"
7. "Alright"
8. "You Want This"
9. "Control"
10. "What Have You Done for Me Lately"
11. "The Pleasure Principle"
12. "Escapade"
13. "When I Think of You"
14. "All for You"
15. "All Nite (Don't Stop)"
16. "Love Will Never Do (Without You)"
17. "Again" (video interlude)
18. "Twenty Foreplay"
19. "Where Are You Now"
20. "Come Back to Me"
21. "The Body That Loves You"
22. "Spending Time with You"
23. "No Sleeep"
24. "Got 'til It's Gone"
25. "That's the Way Love Goes"
26. "Island Life"
27. "Throb"
28. "Together Again"
29. "What About"
30. "If"
31. "Rhythm Nation"
32. "Black Eagle"
33. "New Agenda"
34. "Dammn Baby"
35. "I Get Lonely"
36. "Well Traveled"

=== Notes ===
- Missy Elliott joined Jackson on the Atlanta date of the tour on December 17, 2017, performing "Burnitup!". Additionally, Jackson performed her 2006 single "So Excited".
- Jackson performed "Someone to Call My Lover" in place of "Island Life" at several shows, including shows in Cleveland and Memphis.
- For the second leg of the tour, "When We Oooo", "Truth", "Doesn't Really Matter", and "Funny How Time Flies (When You're Having Fun)" were added to the set list.

== Tour dates ==
| Date | City | Country | Venue | Attendance | Revenue |
North America
| September 7, 2017 | Lafayette | United States | Cajundome | 3,992 / 9,668 | $248,203 |
| September 9, 2017 | Houston | United States | Toyota Center | 10,789 / 11,872 | $879,536 |
| September 10, 2017 | Austin | United States | Frank Erwin Center | 4,973 / 10,560 | $438,010 |
| September 13, 2017 | San Antonio | United States | AT&T Center | 6,773 / 13,539 | $508,536 |
| September 14, 2017 | Dallas | United States | American Airlines Center | 11,255 / 13,808 | $878,887 |
| September 16, 2017 | North Little Rock | United States | Verizon Arena | 4,997 / 13,900 | $264,966 |
| September 17, 2017 | Tulsa | United States | BOK Center | 4,315 / 11,146 | $358,156 |
| September 19, 2017 | Albuquerque | United States | Isleta Amphitheater | 12,295 / 15,003 | $478,130 |
| September 21, 2017 | Phoenix | United States | Talking Stick Resort Arena | 7,504 / 12,386 | $513,976 |
| September 23, 2017 | Anaheim | United States | Honda Center | 10,706 / 13,594 | $828,894 |
| September 24, 2017 | Fresno | United States | Save Mart Center | 7,002 / 11,688 | $626,357 |
| September 26, 2017 | Vancouver | Canada | Rogers Arena | 7,077 / 8,063 | $326,808 |
| September 27, 2017 | Seattle | United States | KeyArena | 10,355 / 11,747 | $675,461 |
| September 29, 2017 | Portland | United States | Moda Center | 8,017 / 9,455 | $511,238 |
| October 1, 2017 | Reno | United States | Grand Theatre | —N/a | —N/a |
| October 3, 2017 | Sacramento | United States | Golden 1 Center | 10,768 / 11,774 | $696,058 |
| October 5, 2017 | Concord | United States | Concord Pavilion | 11,062 / 11,988 | $659,180 |
| October 7, 2017 | San Diego | United States | Valley View Casino Center | 8,004 / 9,636 | $620,967 |
| October 8, 2017 | Los Angeles | United States | Hollywood Bowl | 17,500 / 17,500 | $1,778,376 |
| October 14, 2017 | Las Vegas | United States | Mandalay Bay Events Center | 7,583 / 8,077 | $931,996 |
| October 16, 2017 | Salt Lake City | United States | NuSkin Theater | 4,320 / 6,264 | $264,366 |
| October 17, 2017 | Denver | United States | Pepsi Center | 5,748 / 12,103 | $401,516 |
| October 19, 2017 | Kansas City | United States | Sprint Center | 7,544 / 7,544 | $472,714 |
| October 21, 2017 | St. Louis | United States | Chaifetz Arena | 6,894 / 7,440 | $436,425 |
| October 22, 2017 | Milwaukee | United States | BMO Harris Bradley Center | 6,005 / 7,670 | $372,840 |
| October 25, 2017 | Moline | United States | TaxSlayer Center | 3,318 / 8,125 | $207,002 |
| October 26, 2017 | Rosemont | United States | Allstate Arena | 12,363 / 12,363 | $898,295 |
| October 28, 2017 | Toledo | United States | Huntington Center | 5,031 / 7,030 | $391,129 |
| October 29, 2017 | Detroit | United States | Little Caesars Arena | 12,744 / 13,485 | $841,583 |
| November 1, 2017 | Grand Rapids | United States | Van Andel Arena | 5,168 / 7,116 | $300,870 |
| November 2, 2017 | Toronto | Canada | Scotiabank Arena | 12,178 / 12,178 | $681,652 |
| November 4, 2017 | Buffalo | United States | KeyBank Center | 8,244 / 9,249 | $521,050 |
| November 5, 2017 | Boston | United States | TD Garden | 9,956 / 12,545 | $798,339 |
| November 7, 2017 | Providence | United States | Dunkin' Donuts Center | 4,976 / 7,988 | $316,301 |
| November 8, 2017 | Manchester | United States | SNHU Arena | 4,203 / 5,500 | $218,658 |
| November 10, 2017 | Atlantic City | United States | Boardwalk Hall | 8,912 / 11,295 | $657,693 |
| November 11, 2017 | Bethlehem | United States | Sands Bethlehem Event Center | 1,913 / 1,913 | $247,362 |
| November 13, 2017 | Philadelphia | United States | Wells Fargo Center | 9,480 / 13,327 | $761,938 |
| November 15, 2017 | Brooklyn | United States | Barclays Center | 13,165 / 13,165 | $1,515,353 |
| November 16, 2017 | Washington, D.C. | United States | Capital One Arena | 13,562 / 13,562 | $1,156,681 |
| November 18, 2017 | Baltimore | United States | Royal Farms Arena | 11,228 / 12,043 | $833,685 |
| November 19, 2017 | Newark | United States | Prudential Center | 12,862 / 12,862 | $1,059,230 |
| November 26, 2017 | Indianapolis | United States | Bankers Life Fieldhouse | 9,436 / 9,436 | $593,224 |
| November 28, 2017 | Columbus | United States | Value City Arena | 7,851 / 9,632 | $546,075 |
| November 29, 2017 | Pittsburgh | United States | PPG Paints Arena | 8,831 / 10,963 | $478,152 |
| December 1, 2017 | Louisville | United States | KFC Yum! Center | 7,693 / 8,198 | $521,846 |
| December 3, 2017 | Cleveland | United States | Quicken Loans Arena | 6,226 / 7,689 | $505,580 |
| December 4, 2017 | Lexington | United States | Rupp Arena | 3,004 / 5,661 | $213,782 |
| December 6, 2017 | Memphis | United States | FedExForum | 5,586 / 9,548 | $350,517 |
| December 7, 2017 | Nashville | United States | Bridgestone Arena | 8,815 / 8,815 | $516,269 |
| December 9, 2017 | Birmingham | United States | Legacy Arena | 5,910 / 12,703 | $458,354 |
| December 11, 2017 | Sunrise | United States | BB&T Center | 7,140 / 9,673 | $553,528 |
| December 12, 2017 | Jacksonville | United States | Jacksonville Veterans Memorial Arena | 6,953 / 8,659 | $510,021 |
| December 14, 2017 | Norfolk | United States | Norfolk Scope Arena | 7,373 / 7,597 | $558,749 |
| December 16, 2017 | Columbia | United States | Colonial Life Arena | 9,638 / 11,745 | $616,305 |
| December 17, 2017 | Atlanta | United States | Philips Arena | 11,823 / 11,823 | $800,052 |
| July 8, 2018 (Note: The July 8, 2018, concert in New Orleans, United States at Mercedes-Benz Superdome was a part of the Essence Music Festival.) | New Orleans | United States | Mercedes-Benz Superdome | —N/a | —N/a |
| July 11, 2018 | Austin | United States | Austin360 Amphitheater | 5,824 / 5,824 | $299,605 |
| July 13, 2018 | Rogers | United States | Walmart Arkansas Music Pavilion | 5,000 / 5,000 | —N/a |
| July 15, 2018 | Cincinnati | United States | Riverbend Music Center | 6,000 / 6,000 | —N/a |
| July 18, 2018 | Syracuse | United States | Lakeview Amphitheater | 7,207 / 7,207 | $291,687 |
| July 20, 2018 | Hershey | United States | Hersheypark Stadium | 6,985 / 6,985 | $391,499 |
| July 26, 2018 | Saratoga Springs | United States | Saratoga Performing Arts Center | 6,656 / 6,656 | $355,397 |
| July 28, 2018 (Note: The July 28, 2018, concert in New York, United States at Randall's Island Park was a part of the Panorama Music Festival.) | New York City | United States | Randall's Island Park | —N/a | —N/a |
| July 29, 2018 | Virginia Beach | United States | Veterans United Home Loans Amphitheater | 9,279 / 9,279 | $372,132 |
| August 1, 2018 | Raleigh | United States | Coastal Credit Union Music Park | 8,241 / 8,241 | $328,498 |
| August 3, 2018 | Charlotte | United States | PNC Music Pavilion | 10,691 / 10,691 | $453,554 |
| August 5, 2018 | Miami | United States | American Airlines Arena | 5,237 / 5,237 | $445,565 |
| August 7, 2018 | Tampa | United States | MidFlorida Credit Union Amphitheatre | 7,367 / 7,367 | $356,436 |
| August 10, 2018 | Stateline | United States | Lake Tahoe Outdoor Arena | 5,482 / 5,482 | $580,475 |
| August 12, 2018 (Note: The August 12, 2018, concert in San Francisco, United States at Golden Gate Park was a part of the Outside Lands Music and Arts Festival.) | San Francisco | United States | Golden Gate Park | 67,159 / 67,159 | $9,247,836 |
| September 26, 2018 (Note: The September 26, 2018, concert in San Francisco, United States at Bill Graham Civic Auditorium was a part of the Dreamfest.) | San Francisco | United States | Bill Graham Civic Auditorium | —N/a | —N/a |
| September 29, 2018 (Note: The September 29, 2018, concert in New York City, United States at Central Park was a part of the Global Citizen Festival.) | New York City | United States | Great Lawn | —N/a | —N/a |
| September 30, 2018 | Uncasville | United States | Mohegan Sun Arena | 3,738 / 3,738 | $339,351 |
| October 2, 2018 | Atlantic City | United States | Mark G. Etess Arena | 3,500 / 3,500 | —N/a |
| January 30, 2019 (Note: The January 30, 2019, concert in Las Vegas, United States at MGM Grand Garden Arena was a part of the Choreographer's Carnival Ball.) | Las Vegas | United States | MGM Grand Garden Arena | —N/a | —N/a |
Asia
| February 10, 2019 | Tokyo | Japan | Nippon Budokan | 18,000 / 18,000 | $2,160,000 |
| February 11, 2019 | Tokyo | Japan | Nippon Budokan | 18,000 / 18,000 | $2,160,000 |
North America
| April 7, 2019 (Note: The April 7, 2019, concert in Miami, United States at Carnival Breeze was a part of the Tom Joyner Foundation Fantastic Voyage.) | Miami | United States | Carnival Breeze | —N/a | —N/a |
| Total | | | | 548,878 / 641,160 (85%) | $39,645,693 |

=== Cancelled shows ===
List of cancelled concerts
| Date | City | Country | Venue | Reason |
|---|---|---|---|---|
| July 22, 2018 (Note: The July 22, 2018, concert in Los Angeles, United States at Exposition Park was going to be a part of the FYF Fest.) | Los Angeles | United States | Exposition Park | Cancellation of Festival |
