= Unbreakable (Janet Jackson album) =

Studio album by Janet Jackson
- Released: October 2, 2015
- Recorded: 2013–2015
- Studios: Flyte Tyme Studios (Agoura Hills); The Cadillac Castle (Century City); MusicTone LLC (Hollywood); TBhits (Grand Hills, Los Angeles); MixStar Studios in Virginia Beach
- Genres: Pop; R&B
- Length: 64:37
- Labels: Rhythm Nation; BMG
- Producers: J. Cole; Dem Jointz; Missy Elliott; Janet Jackson; James "Jimmy Jam" Harris; Terry Lewis; Tommy McClendon

Janet Jackson chronology
Icon: Number Ones (2010)	Unbreakable (2015)	Japanese Singles Collection -Greatest Hits- (2022)

Singles from Unbreakable
- 1. "No Sleeep" Released: June 22, 2015; 2. "Unbreakable" Released: September 29, 2015; 3. "Dammn Baby" Released: May 4, 2016

Unbreakable is the eleventh studio album by American singer Janet Jackson. It was released on October 2, 2015, and is the first album released under her independent label Rhythm Nation, with BMG Rights Management through a partnership with the singer. Jackson had parted ways with Island Records in 2008 due to dissatisfaction over the company's lack of promotion for her tenth studio album, Discipline (2008). The singer began recording new material with producer Rodney Jerkins the following year, but eventually abandoned the project. She became busy with film roles and embarked on a worldwide concert tour, and in 2013 announced her third marriage to Qatari businessman Wissam Al Mana. Two years later in May 2015, Jackson announced that she would embark on the Unbreakable World Tour and release Unbreakable.

Jackson reunited with songwriting/production duo Jimmy Jam and Terry Lewis, their last collaboration being on her ninth studio album 20 Y.O. (2006). Additional songwriting and production was provided by Dem Jointz and Tommy McClendon. Featured artists include rappers J. Cole and Missy Elliott. Unbreakable's theme reflects various experiences over the course of Jackson's life—including aspects of her childhood and the death of her brother Michael—in addition to socially conscious messages prevalent in her 1989 album Rhythm Nation 1814. Its lead single "No Sleeep" became her 40th entry on the US Billboard Hot 100 singles chart, peaking at number 63, as well as her most successful entry on the US Adult R&B Songs chart, topping the chart for twelve non-consecutive weeks.

The album debuted at number one on the Billboard 200, becoming Jackson's seventh album to top the chart in the United States. This made her the third act in the history of the chart to have a number one album in each of the last four decades. It also peaked within the top 40 of most major music markets. It received mostly positive reviews from music critics, with some commenting that it reflected her maturation. Unbreakable was named by several publications as one of the best album releases of 2015. As of April 2016, the album has sold over 253,000 copies in the United States.

== Background ==
After releasing her tenth studio album Discipline in 2008, Jackson parted ways with her label home of 14 months, Island Records. A spokesperson for the singer added, "[Jackson] will have autonomy over her career, without the restrictions of a label system... Always known to break new ground and set trends, Jackson's departure from Island Records makes her one of the first superstar artists to have the individual freedom to promote their work through a variety of avenues such as iTunes, mobile carriers and other diverse and innovative channels." Mariel Concepcion of Billboard magazine suggested "Jackson would seem to be a natural fit at Live Nation Artists, which is already home to Jay-Z, Nickelback and Shakira." The following year, she suffered the unexpected death of her brother Michael Jackson; she later performed a special tribute to him at the 2009 MTV Video Music Awards. She also ended her seven-year relationship with record producer Jermaine Dupri.

As a joint venture with EMI, Universal Music Enterprises subsequently released her second greatest hits compilation, Number Ones (2009) under A&M Records. Although she began recording new material with producer Rodney Jerkins, she eventually abandoned the project, still unwilling to specify whether she intended to sign with a major label or release music independently. UMe and A&M later released her third compilation Icon: Number Ones (2010) as the debut of the Icon album series, designed to feature "the greatest hits, signature tunes and fan favorites of the most popular artists in music history." After starring in feature films Why Did I Get Married Too? and For Colored Girls in 2010, she embarked on the world concert tour Number Ones, Up Close and Personal in 2011 to promote her second compilation. In 2013, she indicated she was once again working on a new record. Later that year, she also revealed that she was married to her third husband, Qatari businessman Wissam Al Mana. She announced in May 2015, that she would embark on the Unbreakable World Tour and release her eleventh studio album through her newly formed, independent record label as a result of a partnership between herself and BMG.

== Recording ==
In October 2009, just a month before Jackson released her second compilation album Number Ones (2009), American producer Rodney "Darkchild" Jerkins revealed that they were working together on the singer's eleventh studio album:

"Since we've been working ... I feel like the studio has become a second home for her because with the whole situation with Michael [Jackson] happening, and I feel like right now, emotionally, she can come here and let all her feelings out. [...] You gotta understand, she lost her brother. She was in a relationship for seven years [with Jermaine Dupri] that's over now. There's things that she told me that I didn't even realize. You know, certain [things] like self-esteem that I didn't even realize that she dealt with for years that, you know. ... She's working on her book and she'll deal with that in her book, but also in songs, certain songs we're dealing with that head on. And sometimes it can be a touchy subject for us to even go into, and I kinda had to persuade her, 'Let's just go, let's talk about that.' And she's been doing it, and she's a pro about it."

However, in 2010, Jackson revealed she had scrapped the recorded material with Jerkins. Although she recorded and released "Nothing" as the theme for the film Why Did I Get Married Too?, she stated: "There have been a lot of record labels that have asked me to sit down and talk with them, but I don't know if I want to do something completely independent, or go with a major". In August 2011, while touring with her Number Ones, Up Close and Personal world tour, the singer stated that she would "go back into the studio later this year or early next. I am not sure what I will be doing yet. I like to be inspired by what is going on in my life at that time". In 2013, she confirmed she was recording a new album and "creating the concept and initial thoughts on the music."

In August 2014, producer and engineer Ian Cross, who worked on her last three studio albums, confirmed in an interview with studio monitor manufacturer Barefoot Sound that he was working on Jackson's new album, stating, "The new album is going to be great. It's a process. There's a lot in store, yet to come", also saying they worked in recording studios in Qatar, Paris, and Middle East. He asserted that he and the singer "had a little bit more of a special relationship because we became friends naturally. You meet a lot of people and you become friends with a couple of them, but sometimes there is one person you become really good friends with. She asked me to work on an album with her called Discipline in 2007 and, again, just do the same thing, produce the vocals. That led to her hiring me full-time to work with her. That's where I'm at now". After Cross' declarations, Jackson herself responded to the rumor, neither confirming nor denying the works, stating: "If there is a new project, you'll hear it from my lips", she tweeted. Barefoot Sound subsequently removed the full text of the Cross interview from their website. Unbreakable saw Jackson reunite with long-time producers Jimmy Jam and Terry Lewis, who did not contribute to her previous project.

== Composition ==
Unbreakable is divided into two sides; the first side is composed mostly by dance-pop and R&B songs, while the second one is more experimental. The album opens with the title track "Unbreakable", a mid-tempo R&B song, which describes Jackson's unyielding devotion to her fans. The following track "Burnitup!" is an uptempo song with electronic beats, with processed vocal samples and house drums. Jackson asks "Mr. DJ" to "turn it up" and the crowd to "dance like no-one's watching", while Elliott raps "Make it work, make it work, make it work". "Dammn Baby", the third track, has hints of trap bass and percussion, and bits of previous single "I Get Lonely" into its breakdown. In the fourth song "The Great Forever", she is reportedly to sound like her late brother Michael Jackson, and addresses the curiosity about her romantic life. "I don't see why loving someone or what I do seem so radical to you [...] What you think doesn't mean nothing at all / Doesn't change who I am." The next track, "Shoulda Known Better" opens as a ballad, but develops EDM beats for its underpinning. During the song, she asks "Why, why, why?", before making a call for social action. "We won't accept excuses. We tolerate no abuses". Sixth track, "After You Fall", is a stripped ballad with Jackson's vocals being accompanied by only a piano line. The following song "Broken Hearts Heal" is a song with "breezy" vocal harmonies, and a tribute to her brother Michael, reminiscing about a childhood full of singing and laughing together. During the chorus, she sings "Our love ain't no material thing/Inshallah see you in the next life". Eight track "Night" is a house track which accompanies breathy vocals by Jackson. The ninth song and lead single from the album, "No Sleeep", is an R&B song, which lyrically finds Jackson crooning about a long-distance romance over "soulful" keyboards and programmed drums.

Starting the second part, "Dream Maker / Euphoria", the tenth track, is an R&B song with a soul sample, and at one point of the song she sings "Wish I could create a perfect place, without jealousy, abuse, or hate". Eleventh song "2 B Loved" is described lyrically as a "rapturous celebration of the power of love", complete with a "burst of sunshiny pop froth complete with hand claps, [and] a hip-shaking groove". Next track "Take Me Away" has an electro-rock arrangement and lyrically looks for escape with a lover. The following and thirteenth song "Promise" is an interlude. The fourteenth track, "Lessons Learned", is built over a "plucked" guitar figure, on which Jackson sings about an abusive relationship where the victim keeps that way. At one point of the song Jackson sings "What makes her want to stay?". "Black Eagle", the next song, is a two-part song that sets its mysticism and self-help to modal phrases and quiet finger snaps; she addresses the struggles of today, but goes with "Because every life matters... We all need to do better." The sixteenth track "Well Traveled" is arena rock, described as a "Bon Jovi power ballad" song. The closing track, "Gon' B Alright", is "twisted" psychedelic rock, and was compared to Sly & The Family Stone sound.

== Singles ==
The album's lead single, titled "No Sleeep", was released on June 22, 2015. In early June, Jimmy Jam tweeted, "Early morning #Plush #NoSL333P #ConversationsInACafe", along with a picture of sheet music in a darkened studio. Fans quickly found out the titles "No SL333P" and "Plush" in the picture. Later, a snippet of the song was leaked, followed by a countdown on her official website which revealed the song on June 22, 2015. The album version of the song features additional verses from American rapper J. Cole. It was released to radio airplay and made available for digital download on July 23, 2015. Jackson's solo version of the single debuted on the US Billboard Hot 100 at number 67, marking her 40th entry on the chart. The album version featuring J. Cole enabled it to re-enter the Hot 100 with a new peak position at number 63, while also topping the US Adult R&B Songs chart. The music video for the third single, titled "Dammn Baby", was released May 4, 2016 on YouTube and her official Facebook page. The song debuted on the US Adult R&B Songs chart at number 20.

== Release and promotion ==
On April 22, 2015, she tweeted, "Letting go doesn't mean you stop", after a fan created a mock Missing Persons poster of Jackson which had begun circulating the internet prompting Jackson to retweet it herself, adding to further speculation of a new album. On May 16, 2015, on her 49th birthday, Jackson announced a new album and world tour and stated "I promised you would hear it from my lips. And now you will. This year, new music, new world tour, a new movement. I've been listening. Let's keep the conversation going." It was later announced that she will release her new album in the fall of 2015 under her own record label, Rhythm Nation, distributed by BMG Rights Management. The launch of Rhythm Nation marks Jackson as among the few African-American female musicians to establish a record label. In June, she released the album's first single, "No Sleeep". That same month, she teased a track titled "Love", which was later re-titled "Unbreakable". The song is about how important her fans were to her. On August 20, 2015, she released a preview of a new song "The Great Forever", while also confirming the title of her eleventh studio album as Unbreakable, and is set to release on October 2, 2015.

She has promoted the album through social media, frequently using the hashtag #ConversationsInACafe as well as taglines "I've been listening" and "Let's keep the conversation going." To further promote the album, Jackson embarked on the accompanying Unbreakable World Tour in August 2015. Pre-sale tickets were made available exclusively to American Express and Citibank cardholders prior to general admission tickets going on sale on June 22, 2015. Jackson's forthcoming album was also made available for pre-order, along with vinyl copies of the album's lead single "No Sleeep". On September 19, 2015, Jackson was set to perform at the iHeartRadio Music Festival at the MGM Grand Garden Arena. However, on September 18, her rep confirmed she had withdrawn from the festival. Due to Jackson's pregnancy, the Unbreakable World Tour resulted in postponement until September 2017; re-branded the State of the World Tour, with a new setlist and costumes.

== Critical reception ==
Professional ratings
Aggregate scores
Source	Rating
AnyDecentMusic?	7.0/10
Metacritic	75/100
Review scores
Source	Rating
AllMusic	3.5/5 stars
The A.V. Club	B
Chicago Tribune	3/4 stars
Consequence of Sound	B+
Entertainment Weekly	B+
The Guardian	3/5 stars
Los Angeles Times	3.5/4 stars
Pitchfork	8.0/10
Slant Magazine	3.5/5 stars
Spin	8/10

Unbreakable received positive reviews. At Metacritic, which assigns a weighted mean rating out of 100 to reviews from music critics, the album received an average score of 75, which indicates "generally favorable reviews" based on 22 critics. Jim Fusilli of The Wall Street Journal complimented Jackson's vocals, as well as her efforts to craft a contemporary but familiar sound to add to her diverse catalog. He notes that she and her primary producers, Jam and Lewis, "explore a satisfying range of musical styles plucked from across the span of pop history" including funk, electronic dance music and soul. According to Jed Gottlieb of the Boston Herald, "[u]nlike her peers, Jackson doesn't fear slow-burn R&B. This kind of quiet storm soul shows up again and again, on the big ballad 'Well Traveled' and the lead single 'No Sleeep'." Writing for Entertainment Weekly, Kyle Anderson called the album "her most sonically diverse set since 1997's quirky, hypersexual The Velvet Rope" adding that "the most thrilling aspect of Unbreakable is her willingness to experiment." Jon Pareles of The New York Times commented that Jackson depicts a far more subdued persona in comparison to the explicit nature of her previous albums. He states that "[f]or most of 'Unbreakable,' she plays big sister—someone who's happily in love, willing to offer advice and wishing for a better world. It's a benign role but a modest one, reinforced by the music." Newsday's Glenn Gamboa wrote that Unbreakable reflects her maturation, stating that after a tumultuous period in her career following the Super Bowl XXXVIII halftime show controversy, "Jackson finally seems like herself again—actually an even wiser version of herself."

In her review for USA Today, Elysa Gardner wrote: "The young woman intent on liberating herself and the world is still socially and spiritually conscious, but she has evolved into a more settled, reflective artist ... With Unbreakable, Jackson, already a proven survivor—of both her family's well-publicized struggles and decades of changing trends in pop music and culture—gives us no reason to doubt that people will keep watching, and listening." Mikael Wood of Los Angeles Times wrote that the album is a collection of "grand-scaled but meticulously detailed songs" that include a mix of balladry, R&B, rock and EDM. Wood comments that although "the music makes for delicious ear candy, Jackson isn't content to leave it at that. She also has messages to deliver[.]" Writing for The Guardian, Alex Macpherson remarked: "Unbreakable’s highlights are low-key moments of reflection and nostalgia: the hypnotic sway of Promise, the languorous dread of Lessons Learned and After You Fall, a skeletal piano lullaby that seems composed for Jackson’s late brother Michael, and on which she once again demonstrates the emotional range of her voice." Rebecca Haithcoat of Spin rated Unbreakable 8/10, stating that "it proves Janet can still surprise us. Who would've ever envisioned her slipping on a pair of boots and cowboy-cut Wranglers to sing 'Lessons Learned,' a country-tinged ballad about co-dependency? Or that she and the boys would've gone full Nashville and let a steel guitar cry and a little twang curl the edges of her voice on 'Well Traveled' (and that the whole thing would work!)?" Andy Kellman of AllMusic gave the album 3.5/5 stars, complimenting Jackson's diversity of sound while referencing her own catalog and familial influences. He remarked: "No one but Jackson can directly reference previous triumphs, address her audience, and yet move forward quite like this."

=== Accolades ===
Publication	Country	Accolade	Year	Rank
Exclaim!	Canada	Top 10 Soul and R&B Albums of 2015	2015	10
The Guardian	United Kingdom	Best Albums of 2015	2015	37
Entertainment Weekly	United States	The 40 Best Albums of 2015	2015	11
Slant Magazine	United States	The 25 Best Albums of 2015	2015	13
Newsday	United States	Best albums of 2015	2015	9
ABC News	United States	50 Best Albums of 2015	2015	49
Spin	United States	The 50 Best Albums of 2015	2015	50
Pitchfork Media	United States	The 50 Best Albums of 2015	2015	36
Rolling Stone	United States	20 Best R&B Albums of 2015	2015	8
People	United States	Best Albums 2015	2015	8
About.com	United States	Top 20 Pop Albums of 2015	2015	6
BET	United States	The Best R&B Albums of 2015	2015	*
Los Angeles Times	United States	2015's Must-hear Albums	2015	*
Cosmopolitan	United States	Top 15 Best Albums of 2015	2015	6

== Commercial performance ==
Unbreakable debuted at number one on the US Billboard 200 chart in the week ending October 8, 2015. The album sold 116,000 album-equivalent units in its first week, which included streaming and individual digital song sales. Of that sum, the album sold 109,000 in pure sales. This became Jackson's seventh number one album on that chart and also made her the third act to amass a number one album in each of the last four decades. The album also debuted at number one in the US Independent Albums Chart. In its second week, the album dropped to number eight on the chart, earning an additional 30,000 units, which represented a drop of 74 percent in album sales. Of that sum, 27,911 were in pure album sales. As of April 28, 2016, the album has sold 384,000 copies in the United States. In Canada the album also debuted at number one, with sales of 4,300 units. It became Jackson's second chart-topping album in Canada in the Soundscan era since All for You debuted atop the charts in 2001.

In the United Kingdom, the album debuted at number eleven on the UK Albums Chart, which represents her highest debut in that country since 2001 when All for You debuted at number two. Her previous albums had missed the top 20 with Damita Jo peaking at number 32, and 20 Y.O. and Discipline both debuting at number 63.

== Track listing ==
All tracks were written and produced by Janet Jackson, James Harris III, and Terry Lewis (the latter two being credited as Jimmy Jam and Terry Lewis for production roles), except tracks 1–3, 5, 8–11, 17, 19, with additional co-writers and co-producers as noted.

Unbreakable – Standard edition
No.	Title	Writer(s)	Producer(s)	Length
1.	"Unbreakable"	Thomas Lumpkins	Dem Jointz; Tommy McClendon	3:38
2.	"Burnitup!" (featuring Missy Elliott)	Dwayne Abernathy; Melissa Elliott	Jointz; Elliott	4:09
3.	"Dammn Baby"	Abernathy	Jointz	3:55
4.	"The Great Forever"			4:18
5.	"Shoulda Known Better"		Jointz	4:45
6.	"After You Fall"			4:48
7.	"Broken Hearts Heal"			3:42
8.	"Night"	Lumpkins; Michaela Renee Shiloh	McClendon	4:14
9.	"No Sleeep" (featuring J. Cole)	Jermaine Cole	Cole	4:20
10.	"Dream Maker / Euphoria"	Lumpkins	McClendon	2:46
11.	"2 B Loved"	Lumpkins; Abernathy	Jointz	2:55
12.	"Take Me Away"			4:18
13.	"Promise"			0:57
14.	"Lessons Learned"			4:23
15.	"Black Eagle"			3:17
16.	"Well Traveled"			4:18
17.	"Gon' B Alright"	Lumpkins	McClendon	3:54
Total length:				64:37

Unbreakable – Digital edition
No.	Title	Writer(s)	Producer(s)	Length
18.	"No Sleeep"	Cole		3:26
19.	"No Sleeep" (AFSHeeN Remix featuring J. Cole)	Cole		2:59
Total length:				71:02

Unbreakable – Target, HMV & Australian edition
No.	Title	Writer(s)	Producer(s)	Length
18.	"Promise of You"			4:30
19.	"Love U 4 Life"	Lumpkins	McClendon	2:42
Total length:				71:09

Unbreakable – Japanese edition
No.	Title	Writer(s)	Producer(s)	Length
20.	"No Sleeep (PKCZ Remix)"	Cole		3:23
Total length:				74:53

== Charts ==
=== Weekly charts ===
Chart (2015)	Peak position
Australian Albums (ARIA)	11
Australian Urban Albums (ARIA)	2
Belgian Albums (Ultratop Flanders)	20
Belgian Albums (Ultratop Wallonia)	18
Canadian Albums (Billboard)	1
Czech Albums (ČNS IFPI)	30
Dutch Albums (Album Top 100)	12
French Albums (SNEP)	28
German Albums (Offizielle Top 100)	34
Irish Albums (IRMA)	27
Irish Independent Albums (IRMA)	6
Italian Albums (FIMI)	26
Japanese Albums (Oricon)	18
Japanese International Albums (Oricon)	4
Scottish Albums (Official Charts)	21
South Korean International Albums (Gaon)	19
Spanish Albums (Promusicae)	36
Swedish Albums (Sverigetopplistan)	46
Swiss Albums (Schweizer Hitparade)	28
UK Albums (Official Charts)	11
UK Independent Albums (Official Charts)	2
US Billboard 200	1
US Independent Albums (Billboard)	1
US Top R&B/Hip-Hop Albums (Billboard)	1

=== Year-end charts ===
Chart (2015)	Position
US Billboard 200	159
US Independent Albums (Billboard)	5
US Top R&B Albums	7
US Top R&B/Hip-Hop Albums (Billboard)	20

Chart (2016)	Position
US Independent Albums (Billboard)	19
US Top R&B Albums (Billboard)	19
US Top R&B/Hip-Hop Albums (Billboard)	43

== Release history ==
List of release dates, showing region, format(s), label, and references
Region	Date	Format(s)	Label	Ref.
Worldwide	October 2, 2015	CD; digital download; LP	Rhythm Nation; BMG	
Japan	October 3, 2015	CD	Rhythm Nation; Sony	
Worldwide	April 1, 2016	Gatefold	Rhythm Nation; BMG	

== See also ==
- List of Billboard 200 number-one albums of 2015
- List of Billboard number-one R&B/hip-hop albums of 2015
- List of number-one albums of 2015 (Canada)
