= Unbreakable (Janet Jackson song) =

Single by Janet Jackson

from the album Unbreakable
- Released: September 11, 2015
- Studio: Flyte Tyme Studios (Agoura Hills, CA); MusicTone LLC (Hollywood, CA); TBhits (Grand Hills, CA)
- Genre: R&B
- Length: 3:38
- Label: Rhythm Nation; BMG
- Songwriters: Janet Jackson; James Harris III; Terry Lewis; Thomas Lumpkins
- Producers: Janet Jackson; Jimmy Jam and Terry Lewis; Dem Jointz; Tommy McClendon

Janet Jackson singles chronology
"No Sleeep" (2015)	"Unbreakable" (2015)	"Dammn Baby" (2016)

"Unbreakable" is a song recorded by American singer-songwriter Janet Jackson for her eleventh studio album of the same name. It was co-written and produced by Jackson and her long-time collaborators Jimmy Jam and Terry Lewis, with additional writing by Thomas Lumpkins and additional production by Tommy McClendon and Dem Jointz. The song debuted on September 3, 2015 on Apple Music's Beats 1 radio station and was made available for digital download on the same day Jackson officially announced the studio album's release date and track list. It was subsequently released to urban contemporary radio on September 29, 2015 and to urban adult contemporary radio on October 5, 2015 as the album's second single.

"Unbreakable" is a mid-tempo R&B song, which instrumentation consists of a thumping bass and a subdued beat, having a soul-sample throughout the track and Jackson's vocals. It starts a cappella, shifting into a smooth, mid-tempo groove, and towards the end, the beat is pulled back for a spoken outro over finger snaps. Lyrically, the song finds Jackson expressing her gratitude towards her loyal fan base and a lover, while also addressing her absence. The song received largely positive reviews from music critics, who praised its groove, her vocals and its harmonies. "Unbreakable" was added to Jackson's 2015–16 Unbreakable World Tour.

== Background and release ==
After a period of hiatus and numerous rumours about whether she was recording a new album or not, Janet Jackson officially announced her return on May 16, 2015. Jackson announced she had founded her own label, Rhythm Nation, becoming the first female African-American recording artist to do so, while also planning the album to be distributed by BMG, as well as preparing herself for a new world tour in the same year. She also announced that her world tour was called Unbreakable World Tour, and on August 20, 2015, it was confirmed that Unbreakable was also the album's title. On September 3, 2015, its track list was revealed, with its title track being one of the seventeen tracks on the album. On the same day, the song was released to digital download and streaming for those who pre-ordered the album, as well as it premiered on Apple Music's Beats 1 radio station, hosted by Ebro Darden. On September 29, 2015, the song was officially released to urban contemporary radio stations as the album's second single, while being sent to urban adult contemporary radio on October 5, 2015.

== Composition and lyrics ==
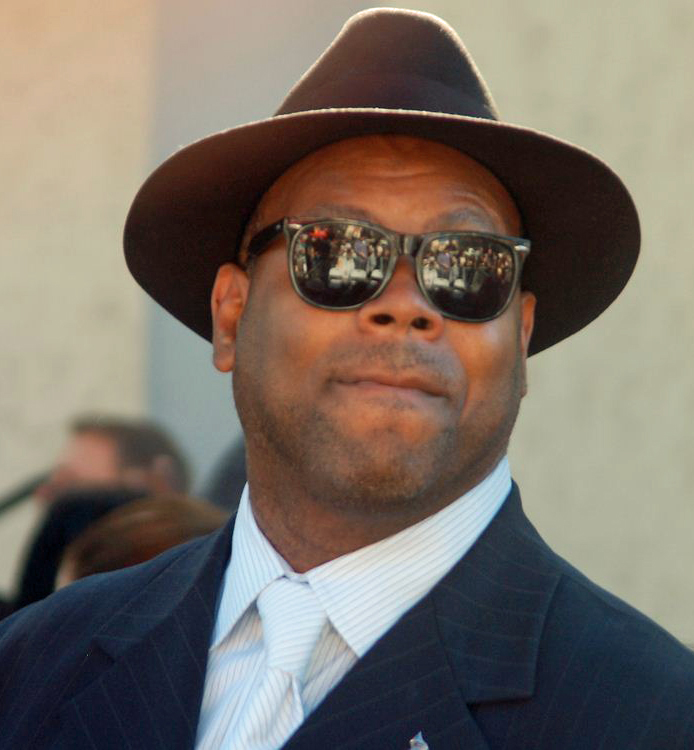
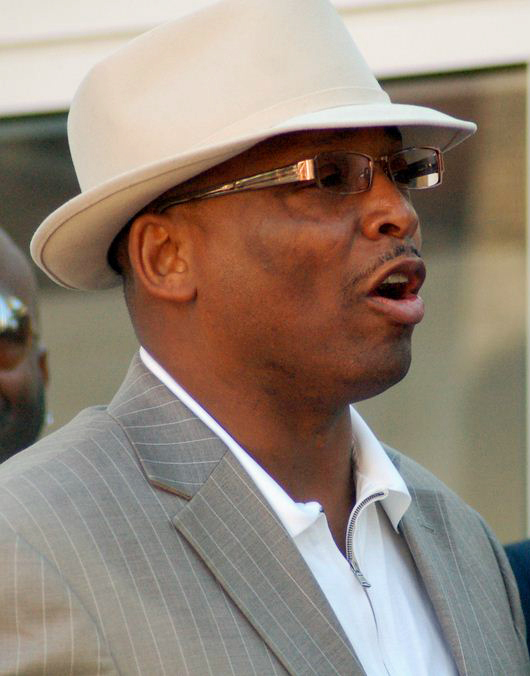
Jimmy Jam and Terry Lewis, Jackson's long-time collaborators, wrote the track along with her and Dem Jointz.

"Unbreakable" was written and produced by Janet Jackson, Jimmy Jam and Terry Lewis, with additional writing by Thomas Lumpkins. It was co-produced by Tommy McClendon with additional production being done by Dem Jointz. Mixing was done by Serban Ghenea and John Hanes served as the song's engineer. It is a mid-tempo R&B song, with its instrumentation consisting in a thumping bass and a subdued "funky" beat, having a "distinctive Janet sound", according to some critics, and a soul-sample, while Jackson's vocals were considered "breezy" and "soulful". It starts with "a melodic almost a cappella intro, with Jackson singing, "I lived through my mistakes, it's just a part of growing", before it "segways into a legit bop." According to Fuse's Mark Sundstrom, its pre-chorus is "full of rich harmonies that give a retro—dare we say Jackson 5—vibe".

Towards the end, Jackson gives a spoken outro against some finger snaps. Music Times' Carolyn Menyes observed that the lyrics during that outro, "Hello. It's been a while. Lots to talk about. I'm glad you're still here. I dedicate myself to you. I hope you enjoy", directly addresses the listeners who had waited for new music from her. Lyrically, "Unbreakable" is a dedication to her fans, with Jackson expressing thankfulness and praising her loyal fan base and a lover, with lines like, "Never for a single moment did I ever go without your love" and "You made me feel wanted, and I want to tell you how important you are to me." Lewis, one of its producers, commented on the song's lyrics, saying, "Some people think of unbreakable as being hard, but I think unbreakable is just being able to be vulnerable and to be able to withstand what comes to you. She’s lived a lot of life in the last few years."

== Reception ==
"Unbreakable" received mostly positive reviews from music critics. Andy Kellman of AllMusic praised the "relaxed and wistful groove", as well as "her lead and background vocals in the chorus arranged to stellar effect", picking the song as one of the album's standout tracks. Loren DiBlasi of MTV referred to the song as "classic Janet [with] angelic vocals delivered with timeless R&B style," claiming she "has not lost her touch." Evan Sawdey of PopMatters called it "a solid mid-tempo groove, something that is all well and good until those multi-layered vocal harmonies come in during the chorus and we’re instantly transplanted back to Janet of old, her familiar coo still sounding remarkably fresh after all this time." Maura Johnston of Time noted that its "space-age synth [...] blossoms into a sunny-day soul strut," while giving praise towards Jackson's voice, which according to her, "always notable for the emotion it could pack into even the simplest verse, [being] particularly suited to this type of laid-back R&B." Mark Sundstrom wrote for Fuse that he was "obsessed" with the track and "sold" on the album, also praising its "rich harmonies" that "totally suits Janet's sexy, sultry vocals." Anupa Mistry of Pitchfork called it a "giddy, grateful grown-woman song", Citing "Unbreakable" as one of the album's "affecting surprises", USA Today writer Elysa Gardner named it "brightly infectious", while Carolyn Menyes of Music Times perceived that it "retains the coolness of the first Unbreakable track fans have heard, 'No Sleeep,' while being totally thematically different, focusing on Jackson's return to the world of music."

Michael Arceneaux of Complex opined that the song "successfully conveys the overall theme of the album and Janet’s state of mind—self-assured, truly ready to sing again, and very much in love." For Saeed Saeed of The National, the track is "the clearest example of Jackson in her new Zen-pop mode: one can imagine that a few years ago this would have been a more raucous affair. Here, the track is a mid-tempo jam that revolves around a superb vocal sample as Jackson soulfully hails the blessings of reflection." While noting that "'Unbreakable' is also the title of a song that began her brother Michael’s final album before he died in 2009", Rob Tannenbaum of Billboard remarked that "the high chorus even sounds like something he might’ve written." Entertainment Weekly's Kyle Anderson echoed the same thought, claiming she 'matches the timbre of his croon" on the track. Writing for the Los Angeles Times, Mikael Wood went on to praise Jimmy Jam and Terry Lewis for creating "grand-scaled but meticulously detailed songs that almost sound as though they’ve been under construction since 2008," citing the song as one example, while praising "Jackson’s lush overdubbed harmonies." Though noting that the song "loops a sweet-soul sample through the verses like an early Kanye West production", Jon Pareles of The New York Times wrote that "the melodies lack the invincible catchiness of Ms. Jackson’s best songs." "Unbreakable" debuted and peaked at number 45 on the UK Indie Chart. It also peaked at number five on the US Billboard's Adult R&B Songs.

== Live performances ==
"Unbreakable" was performed as the closing number on Jackson's 2015–16 Unbreakable World Tour. During the performance of the song, she would introduce each of her dancers and band members by name to the audience. According to Billboard's Eve Barlow, the rendition was "one of only four new songs during a give-the-people-what-they-want spectacular. (Take note, Madonna). More fool anyone who doubted she had the fight in her".

== Credits and personnel ==
Credits for "Unbreakable" adapted from Unbreakable liner notes.

- Janet Jackson – vocals, songwriting, producing
- Thomas Lumpkins – songwriting
- Tommy McClendon – producing, vocals
- James Harris III – songwriting, producing, all instruments
- Terry Lewis – songwriting, producing, all instruments
- Dwayne Abernathy – songwriting, producing, mixing
- Serban Ghenea – mixing
- Matthew Marrin – recording
- John Hanes – mixing engineer

== Charts ==
Chart (2015)	Peak position
UK Indie (OCC)	45
US Adult R&B Songs (Billboard)	5

== Release history ==
Region	Date	Format	Label	Ref.
Worldwide	September 11, 2015	Digital download	Rhythm Nation; BMG	
United States	September 29, 2015	Urban Mainstream	Rhythm Nation; BMG	
United States	October 5, 2015	Urban AC	Rhythm Nation; BMG	
