= I Get Lonely =

1998 single by Janet Jackson

Single by Janet Jackson featuring Blackstreet

from the album The Velvet Rope
- Released: February 24, 1998
- Genre: R&B; soul
- Length: 5:17 (album version); 5:12 ("TNT Remix" feat Blackstreet)
- Label: Virgin
- Songwriters: Janet Jackson; James Harris III; Terry Lewis; René Elizondo Jr.
- Producers: Jimmy Jam and Terry Lewis; Janet Jackson

Janet Jackson singles chronology
"Together Again" (1997)	"I Get Lonely" (1998)	"Every Time" (1998)

Music video
- "I Get Lonely" on YouTube
- "I Get Lonely" (remix) featuring Blackstreet on YouTube

"I Get Lonely" is a song by American singer Janet Jackson from her sixth studio album, The Velvet Rope (1997). It was written by Jackson, Jimmy Jam and Terry Lewis and Jackson's then-husband, René Elizondo Jr. It was released on February 24, 1998, by Virgin Records as the album's third single. The track is a departure from Jackson's signature brand of crossover dance-pop and R&B into a pure R&B and soul vibe. Lyrically, it expresses loneliness and the desire for an estranged lover. A remixed version of the song featured American R&B group Blackstreet.

The Blackstreet duet version of "I Get Lonely" became Jackson's eighteenth consecutive top-ten hit on the US Billboard Hot 100, setting a record as the only female artist in history to achieve that feat. The song received a BMI Pop Award for "Most Played Song" and a Grammy Award nomination for Best Female R&B Vocal Performance, and was later included on Janet's second greatest hits album Number Ones (2009). Its music video, directed by Paul Hunter, received positive reception for its abounding sex appeal.

== Background ==
"'I Get Lonely' takes me to a place of loss — having lost a lover, wanting the lover back, and dreaming of the time when the dream is fulfilled. The vibe is bittersweet."

— Jackson's description of the song.

"I Get Lonely" is a departure from Janet's usual mix of dance-pop and R&B, as the song is more neo soul-oriented. It was released as the third single from Jackson's sixth album The Velvet Rope, which chronicled Jackson's struggle with depression and intimacy. In an interview for MTV, she discussed how the depression was causing her to experience deep sadness, forcing her to take breaks from her music career. During the writing and recording of The Velvet Rope she began to spontaneously cancel recording sessions and appeared constantly troubled. The themes of loneliness and abandonment that are explored in "I Get Lonely" are a direct reflection of the emotional state that Jackson was in during the production of the album. Jackson described the album as her most personal work, developed throughout her entire lifetime. She explained, "I never looked deeply at the pain from my past, never tried to understand that pain and work it through. It was a journey I had avoided. But one I now had to face."

== Critical reception ==
Billboard commented "Miss Jackson follows her recent [pop] No. 1 "Together Again" with a grinding ballad that is clearly designed to strengthen her credibility with hardcore R&B listeners." Billboard also considered "I Get Lonely" to be "bold", "R&B flavored", and themed around a "sensitive subject" like other songs from The Velvet Rope; in this particular case, "loneliness". Vibe called "I Get Lonely" a "gigantic voicey song" and praised its structure, saying "the song starts with the beautifully overblown chorus [...] After that, it's official: you're singing it until next year. There're, like, 40 Janets singing the chorus, and she harmonizes with herself like she's the Pips. Honey butter. This is where she wins." The review also noted Jackson's vocal performance as being both heartfelt and convincing, observing "Or maybe Janet Jackson really feels lonely. Because she sounds more convincing, more alive, on "I Get Lonely" than on The Velvet Rope's title song, better than when she's singing about any of that tie-me-up-tie-medown, gettin'-freaked-from-behind "rope burn" stuff." Yahoo! Music described "I Get Lonely" as highlighted by "catchy chord progressions" while The L.A. Times says the song "plumbed relatively raw neo-soul depths." A review from Uproxx also praised the song's quality, stating "It's hard to pinpoint the best aspect of the song: the opening seconds, its melody, the hook or the way Ms. Jackson's voice flutters seamlessly over the beat. What's apparent, however, is that those three traits and more meshed to produce one of the standout records from the most famous female Jackson and a testament of what R&B once was."

Award	Nominated work	Result
Billboard Awards	Top Hot R&B Airplay Single	Won
BMI Pop Awards	Most Played Song	Won
Grammy Awards	Best R&B Vocal Performance – Female	Nominated
Lady of Soul Music Awards	Best R&B Single, Solo	Won
Lady of Soul Music Awards	Best R&B Music Video	Won
VH1 Video Music Awards	Sexiest Music Video of the Year	Won

== Remix versions ==
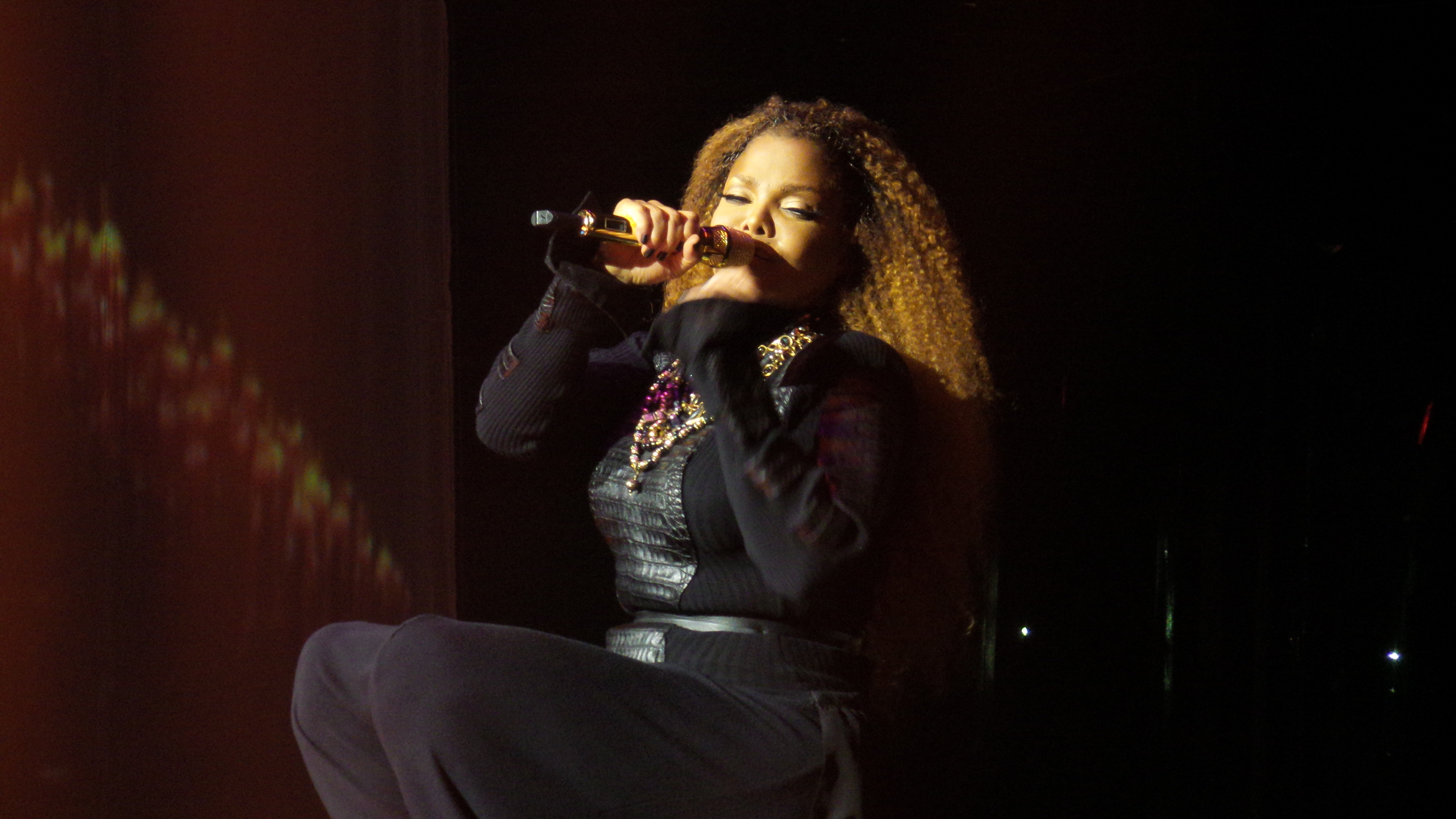
Jackson singing "I Get Lonely" during her Unbreakable World Tour (2015-16).

An alternate remix of "I Get Lonely", known as the TNT Remix, features vocals from Blackstreet and has an electro-R&B/hip-hop soul instrumental produced by Timbaland and Teddy Riley. A solo version of the remix was also produced under the title "TNT Main Mix - Janet Only". A demo of Riley's remix titled the "Teddy Riley Test Pressing Mix" features an instrumental similar to the original and also has alternate, more subdued vocals by Riley and Blackstreet. MTV reported on the release of the remix, stating "After using Gang Starr's DJ Premier on [remixes of] "Together Again," Jackson called in Teddy Riley of Blackstreet to work on 'I Get Lonely.'" Jackson revealed to MTV that she and Riley managed to collaborate on the concept for the remix "via phone." Jackson stated "[Riley] called me every single day with different ideas," Jackson continued, "and I would say, 'O.K., that's cool. Just put it down and let's go from there.' So he'd put a little bit down and call me and play it for me and it was fun." Billboard critiqued the song's various remixes, commenting "Top 40 programmers who prefer Janet as a disco diva are treated to a solid, pop-smart house remix by Jason Nevins, while the cut's original co-producers, Jimmy Jam and Terry Lewis, contribute an odd if ultimately useful booty-bass remix. In each case, the song's infectious chorus and taut melody wisely remain intact. Of course, quietly tacked between the numerous trend-conscious remixes of "I Get Lonely" is the far superior album version. Why not be among the few programmers to buck trends and let the original version works its unmistakable magic?" Regarding the TNT Remix, Billboard commented: "Teddy Riley has been enlisted to spruce up the track with a skittling jeep groove, while Janet's yearning, thickly layered vamps are complemented by a single-only guest appearance by Blackstreet", adding Jackson's and "the groups' voices blend extremely well." British publication Music Week commented that the TNT remix was "the killer cut" of the collection of remixes released in the United Kingdom and would help the single receive "an abundance of radio playlisting" and become a "guaranteed hit".

== Chart performance ==
When the song debuted and peaked at number three on the Billboard Hot 100 it became Jackson's 18th consecutive top ten hit, setting a record for her as the only artist to achieve such a feat. On the chart, it was credited to Jackson and Blackstreet's version, rather than the original. It fared even better on the Hot Dance Singles Sales and Hot R&B/Hip-Hop Songs, peaking at number-one on both charts, spending two weeks at the top position. It was eventually certified gold by the RIAA and has sold more than 900,000 copies. Outside of the US the song performed well, reaching the Top 5 in the United Kingdom, Spain, and South Africa. It peaked in the top 10 in New Zealand, and the top 20 in Italy, Canada, and the Netherlands. It performed moderately well in Australia, peaking at number twenty-one.

== Music video ==
The accompanying music video for "I Get Lonely" was directed by Paul Hunter and choreographed by Tina Landon. It premiered on MTV & BET in March 1998. Similar to other videos and imagery from The Velvet Rope, the video took a more artistic approach, blending Jackson's trademark sex appeal and choreography with the song's theme of loneliness and isolation. The video was later included on the video compilation DVD included with the special edition of Jackson's All for You album. and on the video compilation From Janet to Damita Jo: The Videos. An alternate music video for the "TNT Remix" with Blackstreet was also released, showing new scenes of Jackson performing the song with the group on a platform setting in between the video's original scenes.

The music video received positive reception. MTV News commented, "Anyone who has seen Janet Jackson's latest video for "I Get Lonely" is well acquainted with the singer's physical attributes". Erotic Revolutionaries: Black Women, Sexuality, and Popular Culture author Shayne Lee remarked that Janet's "eroticism intensifies" within the video, saying "In the video for 'I Get Lonely' Janet rips open her shirt exposing a black lace bra and continues dancing as she sings about needing to resolve her loneliness". King magazine also commented on Jackson's physical attributes, stating "You might think she's just dressed like a sexy-ass private eye, but wait for it...wait for it..blaow! The twins come out to play, and they ain't playing fair". Uproxx commented "God bless Janet Jackson for this song and also the cleavage shot in the video. She'll always remain one of the OG sex symbols", also revealing "years later, it still holds up quite well". SoulBounce praised Jackson's new style of "full, vibrant red hair", also calling her appearance "easily the most stunning" of all her prior video looks, continuing to say "Armed with a collection of perfectly fitting pant suits, ample cleavage and undeniable sex appeal", Janet "embodies the passion, beauty and grace of the Velvet Rope era".

The video additionally received nominations for "Sexiest Music Video of the Year" at the VH1 Video Music Awards and "Best R&B Music Video" at the Lady of Soul Music Awards.

== Live performances ==
Janet performed "I Get Lonely" at Europe's TMF Awards, the Soul Train Music Awards, and an acoustic version of the song at The Rosie O'Donnell Show. It was later performed on Jackson's The Velvet Rope Tour, Rock Witchu Tour,Number Ones: Up Close and Personal tour, and Unbreakable World Tour with a review from the New York date of the latter tour calling "I Get Lonely" a "classic" that received "the most love of the night" from the audience. Jackson also included the song on her 2017 State of the World Tour in a medley with Dammn Baby and on the second leg of the tour in 2018, it was included in a medley with "Funny How Time Flies (When You're Having Fun)" and "Any Time, Any Place". Jackson also included the song on her 2019 Las Vegas residency Janet Jackson: Metamorphosis as well as her 2024–2025 Janet Jackson: Las Vegas residency.

== Legacy ==
Australian pop singer Sam Sparro confirmed his "I Wish I Never Met You" video, released 2012, was inspired by Janet's "I Get Lonely" video. Kelly Rowland's performances of "Motivation" on both The Tonight Show with Jay Leno and the 2011 BET Awards were inspired by the performance, outfit, and choreography of Jackson's "I Get Lonely". "I Get Lonely" is mentioned in a chapter of Vincent Tolliver's novel Baptized: A Novel. Dance group SoReal Cru performed a choreographed routine to "I Get Lonely" during the "Janet Jackson Challenge" episode of America's Best Dance Crew. In 2009 dance troupe Choreo Cookies performed a routine to "I Get Lonely" at the "World of Dance" tour.

== Covers ==
Audio Push sampled "I Get Lonely" on "Shine", the lead single from their "Come As You Are" project. Ne-Yo spliced "I Get Lonely" into his performance of "Let's Go", a collaboration with Calvin Harris, at the 2013 NBA All-Star Game. Luke James performed a mash-up of "I Get Lonely" with his single "I Want You" during a performance on the UK's SB.TV in May 2013. Eric Bellinger and Amber Riley of Glee! fame's single "Never Be Lonely" samples "I Get Lonely", altering the song's lyrics to be from a couple's point of view. In August 2013, House producer ESTA's "YouAre(TheOne)" sampled "I Get Lonely", "flipping the sample into a fantastically constructed groovy jam, bursting with sentimental house vibes." B.Slade performed live covers of the song during various appearances throughout 2012. Jessi Teich recorded a jazz cover of "I Get Lonely" for her Live and Unwrapped EP, released 2013. Boney James covered "I Get Lonely" for his Body Language album, while a jazz cover by Alexander Ethan Grey also appeared on the compilation "Smooth Sax Tribute to Janet Jackson". Russell Gunn performed live covers of "I Get Lonely" at "The 32nd Annual Atlanta Jazz Festival" in 2009. Janet, herself, sampled the track's intro in her dance song "Get It Out Me", from her album 20 Y.O. It can be heard at the end of the song then afterwards she says "next track." and the song ends. She'd sample the song again in "Dammn Baby", from Unbreakable (2015)

== Track listings ==
US CD maxi single (V25H-38632)

1. "I Get Lonely" (TNT Remix feat. Blackstreet) – 5:13
2. "I Get Lonely" (TNT Bonus Beat Remix feat. Blackstreet) – 5:18
3. "I Get Lonely" (Jason Vs. Janet - The Club Remix) – 8:09
4. "I Get Lonely" (Jam & Lewis Feel My Bass Mix) – 5:15
5. "I Get Lonely" (Album Version) – 5:17

US CD and cassette single (V25D-38631;4KM38631 )

1. "I Get Lonely" (TNT Remix Edit feat. Blackstreet) – 4:16
2. "I Get Lonely" (LP Edit) – 4:03
3. "I Get Lonely" (Jam & Lewis Feel My Bass Mix - Radio Edit) – 5:15

UK CD maxi single (VSCDT 1683)

1. "I Get Lonely" (TNT Remix Edit feat. Blackstreet) – 4:17
2. "I Get Lonely" (Extended Street Remix) – 5:13
3. "I Get Lonely" (Jam & Lewis Feel My Bass Mix) – 5:15
4. "I Get Lonely" (Jason Vs. Janet - The Remix Sessions Part 2) – 8:39
5. "I Get Lonely" (LP Edit) – 4:03

Australian CD single (8950162)

1. "I Get Lonely" (TNT Remix Edit featuring Blackstreet) – 4:16
2. "I Get Lonely" (Extended Street Remix) – 5:13
3. "I Get Lonely" (Jam & Lewis Feel My Bass Mix) – 5:15
4. "I Get Lonely" (Jason Vs. Janet - The Remix Sessions Part 2) – 8:39
5. "I Get Lonely" (LP Edit) – 4:03
6. "Together Again" (Tony Moran 7" Edit w/ Janet Vocal Intro) – 5:29

European 12-inch single (VST 1683)

A1. "I Get Lonely" (TNT Remix feat. Blackstreet) – 5:13
A2. "I Get Lonely" (TNT Bonus Beat Remix feat. Blackstreet) – 5:18
A3. "I Get Lonely" (Jam & Lewis Feel My Bass Mix) – 5:15
B1. "I Get Lonely" (Jason Vs. Janet - The Remix Sessions Part 2) – 8:39
B2. "I Get Lonely" (Jason's Special Sauce Dub) – 6:40

US 12-inch single (7243 8 38632 1 1)

A1. "I Get Lonely" (Jason Vs. Janet - The Club Remix) – 8:10
A2. "I Get Lonely" (Jason's Special Sauce Dub) – 6:40
B1. "I Get Lonely" (TNT Remix feat. Blackstreet) – 5:13
B2. "I Get Lonely" (Jam & Lewis Feel My Bass Mix) – 5:15

== Charts ==
=== Weekly charts ===
Chart (1997–1998)	Peak position
Australia (ARIA)	21
Belgium (Ultratip Bubbling Under Flanders)	3
Canada (Nielsen SoundScan)	18
Canada Top Singles (RPM)	20
Canada Contemporary Hit Radio (BDS)	22
Canada Dance/Urban (RPM)	5
Croatia (HRT)	7
Europe (European Hot 100 Singles)	14
France (SNEP)	72
Germany (GfK)	75
Hungary (Mahasz)	6
Iceland (Íslenski Listinn Topp 40)	13
Italy (Musica e dischi)	14
Netherlands (Dutch Top 40)	18
Netherlands (Single Top 100)	20
New Zealand (Recorded Music NZ)	6
Scottish Singles Sales (Official Charts)	17
Sweden (Sverigetopplistan)	50
Switzerland (Schweizer Hitparade)	41
UK Singles (Official Charts)	5
UK Dance (Official Charts)	1
UK Hip Hop/R&B (Official Charts)	1
UK Airplay (Music Week)	13
US Billboard Hot 100	3
US Dance Club Songs (Billboard)	10
US Dance Singles Sales (Billboard)	1
US Hot R&B/Hip-Hop Songs (Billboard)	1
US Pop Airplay (Billboard)	29
US Rhythmic Airplay (Billboard)	5

=== Year-end charts ===
Chart (1998)	Position
Canada (SoundScan)	78
US Billboard Hot 100	43
US Hot R&B Singles (Billboard)	13
US Rhythmic Top 40 (Billboard)	29

== Certifications ==
Region	Certification	Certified units/sales
United States (RIAA)	Platinum	1,000,000^{‡}
^{‡} Sales+streaming figures based on certification alone.

== Release history ==
Region	Date	Format(s)	Label(s)	Ref.
United States	February 24, 1998	Commercial	Virgin	
United States	March 2–3, 1998	Urban radio	Virgin	
United States	March 10, 1998	Contemporary hit radio	Virgin	

== See also ==
- List of number-one R&B singles of 1998 (U.S.)
