= Gil Duldulao =

American dancer and choreographer

Gil Duldulao (born April 8, 1979 in Kalihi, Hawaii) is an American dancer, choreographer and creative director. He has worked with artists such as Tina Turner, Jennifer Lopez, Nicki Minaj, Demi Lovato and is best known for his longtime collaborations with Janet Jackson. Duldulao was Creative Director for Jackson's 2017 State of the World Tour, and returned for her 2023–2024 Together Again Tour.
