= Unbreakable World Tour (Janet Jackson) =

2015–16 concert tour by Janet Jackson

- Tour by Janet Jackson
- Promotional poster for the tour
- Associated album: Unbreakable
- Start date: August 31, 2015
- End date: March 26, 2016
- Legs: 2
- No. of shows: 37
- Attendance: 179,340
- Box office: US$15 million ($20.37 million in 2025 dollars)

Janet Jackson concert chronology
- Number Ones, Up Close and Personal (2011); Unbreakable World Tour (2015–2016); State of the World Tour (2017–2019)

The Unbreakable World Tour was the seventh concert tour by American recording artist Janet Jackson. It was in support of her eleventh studio album Unbreakable (2015). In addition to Live Nation and Rhythm Nation, the tour is also sponsored by Nederlander Concerts, Jam Productions, Another Planet Entertainment, Bamp and Tommy Meharey. When the tour was announced in June 2015, multiple legs were planned for North America, Asia and Europe. However, in December 2015, Jackson announced that tour dates beginning in 2016 would be postponed due to surgery and in April 2016 announced the summer dates would be rescheduled due to her pregnancy. In May 2017, she announced the tour would resume beginning in September, renamed as the State of the World Tour.

== Background ==
In August 2014, producer and engineer Ian Cross, who worked on her last three studio albums, confirmed to Barefoot Sound that he was working on Jackson's new album, stating they worked in recording studios in Qatar, Paris and Middle East. After his declarations, Jackson herself responded to the rumor, neither confirming nor denying the works: "If there is a new project, you'll hear it from my lips", she tweeted. On April 22, 2015, she tweeted, "Letting go doesn't mean you stop", after a fan created a mock Missing Persons poster of Jackson, which had begun circulating the internet, prompting Jackson to retweet it herself, adding to further speculation of a new album.

On May 15, 2015, Jackson announced a new album and world tour. She will release her forthcoming eleventh album in the fall of 2015 through her own record label, Rhythm Nation, distributed by BMG Rights Management. Later in June 2015, the first 36 dates of the Unbreakable World Tour in North America were announced. Pre-sale tickets were made available exclusively to American Express and Citibank cardholders prior to general admission tickets going on sale on June 22, 2015. Jackson's forthcoming album was also made available for pre-order, along with vinyl copies of the album's lead single "No Sleeep."

Jackson enlisted designer Giuseppe Zanotti to create custom shoes for the tour. In an interview with Women's Wear Daily Zanotti stated that "Janet will be dancing a lot on stage as well as singing, so I wanted her to be very comfortable and able to move around easily ... The shoe has to be light but practical and provide support to her feet." Zanotti also noted Unbreakable will be the first tour in which he makes custom designs for the entire cast.

== Commercial reception ==
According to Forbes, Jackson's absence since her previous tour coupled with the social media campaign to have her return to recording music and performing generated high ticket prices, averaging $167.20 on the secondary market. The most expensive shows for the first leg of the tour include The Forum in Inglewood, California and the Chicago Theatre, while the Delta Classic Chastain Park Amphitheater in Atlanta will host the least expensive show on the tour.

According to sales reports from Live Nation, "88 percent of the tickets on the trek's first leg (Aug. 31 to Nov. 15) were purchased two weeks after going on sale; nearly 80 percent of the tickets for the second leg (Jan. 12 to March 9) were gone in two days." Due to immediate sell-outs, additional concert dates were added to the Neal S. Blaisdell Center in Honolulu and at the Chicago Theatre. The tour also set a record for the fastest sell-out in the history of Sands Bethlehem Event Center in Bethlehem, Pennsylvania, selling 2,400 tickets within 30 minutes.

According to StubHub, a ticket resale site, the Unbreakable World Tour ranked the tenth most popular concert tour of the fall of 2015.

At the end of 2015, the tour placed at number 74 on Pollstar's "2015 Year-End Top 200 North American Tours" list, grossing $15.0 million from 33 shows with a total attendance of 179,340.

== Critical reception ==
Writing for E!, Zach Johnson wrote that "Janet Jackson made a welcome return to the stage" for the tour's opening concert at the Rogers Arena in Vancouver, British Columbia. She started the concert with a new song, "Burn It Up", featuring rapper Missy Elliott. The remainder of the setlist included new material from Unbreakable as well as numerous classic songs from her catalog. Jon Pareles of The New York Times observed that songs on the setlist were arranged by "persona and tempo. She was the woman taking charge (funk), the joyfully loyal lover (upbeat pop), the ballad singer, the woman left lonely (midtempo R&B), the party girl (dance-club beats), the rocker (with guitar up front) and, in the end, the idealist." He complimented her vocal technique, stating it was "never as delicate as she could make it sound. The rock songs included "Scream" as a duet with the voice of Michael Jackson; she belted it with a raw urgency." He noted that as the concert neared its end, Jackson focused the show on socially conscious messages, including "Rhythm Nation" and a new song from Unbreakable, "a ballad that marched its way toward an anthem, part U2 and part trance music ... It was the virtuous Janet Jackson, the one that was always there." Fish Griwkowsky of the Edmonton Journal said the show "was a dazzling concert, an energetic temple of love with few hits left unturned", adding that "Jackson is ready for the world again".

== Postponement ==
In December 2015, Jackson announced that the upcoming second North American leg of the tour that was set to start in January 2016 would be postponed due to needing surgery. All dates were rescheduled except for one date in Lexington, Kentucky, as the venue would go through renovations.

In March 2016, the European leg of the tour was postponed. On April 6, 2016, Jackson announced that due to family planning, she is postponing all remaining dates of the tour. She stated: "Please, if you can try and understand that it's important that I do this now. I have to rest up, doctor's orders. But I have not forgotten about you. I will continue the tour as soon as I possibly can." According to concert promoter Live Nation, the tour will resume in 2017 and tickets will be honored with rescheduled dates; refunds will also be available.

=== State of the World Tour ===
On May 1, 2017, Jackson announced she would resume the tour, now known as the State of the World Tour; the tour kicked off on September 7, 2017.

== Set list ==
This set list is representative of the show on August 31, 2015 in Vancouver, Canada. It does not represent all shows during the tour.

1. "Video Introduction" (contains elements from "Funny How Time Flies (When You're Having Fun)", "Nasty", "Rock with U", "Every Time", "Rhythm Nation", and "Scream")
2. "BURNITUP!" (contains elements of "Lose Control")
3. "Nasty" (contains elements of "I Don't Fuck with You")
4. "Feedback"
5. "Miss You Much" / "Alright" / "You Want This"
6. "Control" / "What Have You Done for Me Lately" / "The Pleasure Principle"
7. "Escapade"
8. "When I Think of You" / "All for You"
9. "All Nite (Don't Stop)"
10. "Love Will Never Do (Without You)"
11. "After You Fall"
12. "Again" / "Come Back to Me" / "Let's Wait Awhile"
13. "I Get Lonely"
14. "Any Time, Any Place" (contains elements of "Poetic Justice")
15. "No Sleeep"
16. "Got 'til It's Gone"
17. "That's the Way Love Goes" (contains elements of "Classic Man")
18. "Together Again" (DJ Premier 100 in a 50 Remix)
19. "The Best Things in Life Are Free"
20. "Throb"
21. "Black Cat"
22. "If"
23. "Scream" / "Rhythm Nation"

Encore

24. "Shoulda Known Better"
25. "Unbreakable"

Notes

- "Night" was added to the set list, starting with the third night in Honolulu.

== Shows ==
List of concerts, showing date, city, country, venue, tickets sold, number of available tickets and amount of gross revenue
Date	City	Country	Venue	Attendance	Revenue
August 31, 2015	Vancouver	Canada	Rogers Arena	—N/a	—N/a
September 2, 2015	Calgary	Canada	Scotiabank Saddledome	—N/a	—N/a
September 4, 2015	Edmonton	Canada	Rexall Place	6,549 / 8,205 (80%)	$429,480
September 5, 2015	Grande Prairie	Canada	Revolution Place	—N/a	—N/a
September 7, 2015	Saskatoon	Canada	SaskTel Centre	3,488 / 3,500 (99%)	$264,346
September 8, 2015	Winnipeg	Canada	MTS Centre	—N/a	—N/a
September 11, 2015	Grand Rapids	United States	Van Andel Arena	8,621 / 9,102 (95%)	$568,915
September 12, 2015	Cincinnati	United States	PNC Pavilion	4,100 / 4,100 (100%)	$270,862
September 15, 2015	Toronto	Canada	Air Canada Centre	13,239 / 13,239 (100%)	$772,816
September 17, 2015	Raleigh	United States	Walnut Creek Amphitheatre	—N/a	—N/a
September 18, 2015	Charlotte	United States	PNC Music Pavilion	—N/a	—N/a
September 20, 2015	Miami	United States	American Airlines Arena	10,796 / 10,796 (100%)	$704,244
September 23, 2015	Orlando	United States	Amway Center	8,906 / 9,067 (98%)	$736,342
September 24, 2015	Tampa	United States	Amalie Arena	7,702 / 8,811 (87%)	$689,610
September 26, 2015	Atlanta	United States	Delta Classic Chastain Park Amphitheater	—N/a	—N/a
September 27, 2015	Nashville	United States	Ascend Amphitheater	—N/a	—N/a
September 29, 2015	Memphis	United States	FedExForum	—N/a	—N/a
September 30, 2015	New Orleans	United States	Smoothie King Center	12,516 / 12,787 (98%)	$720,281
October 13, 2015	San Francisco	United States	Bill Graham Civic Auditorium	10,172 / 10,172 (100%)	$1,131,847
October 14, 2015	San Francisco	United States	Bill Graham Civic Auditorium	10,172 / 10,172 (100%)	$1,131,847
October 16, 2015	Inglewood	United States	The Forum	12,676 / 12,676 (100%)	$1,410,660
October 17, 2015	San Diego	United States	Viejas Arena	—N/a	—N/a
October 19, 2015	Phoenix	United States	Comerica Theatre	—N/a	—N/a
October 21, 2015	Santa Barbara	United States	Santa Barbara Bowl	8,839 / 8,839 (100%)	$849,456
October 22, 2015	Santa Barbara	United States	Santa Barbara Bowl	8,839 / 8,839 (100%)	$849,456
October 30, 2015	Omaha	United States	CenturyLink Center Omaha	6,671 / 6,675 (99%)	$385,690
November 1, 2015	Minneapolis	United States	Target Center	8,879 / 10,395 (85%)	$466,275
November 3, 2015	Chicago	United States	Chicago Theatre	10,451 / 10,451 (100%)	$1,436,172
November 4, 2015	Chicago	United States	Chicago Theatre	10,451 / 10,451 (100%)	$1,436,172
November 6, 2015	Chicago	United States	Chicago Theatre	10,451 / 10,451 (100%)	$1,436,172
November 12, 2015	Honolulu	United States	Blaisdell Arena	—N/a	—N/a
November 13, 2015	Honolulu	United States	Blaisdell Arena	—N/a	—N/a
November 15, 2015	Honolulu	United States	Blaisdell Arena	—N/a	—N/a
November 19, 2015	Osaka	Japan	Intex Osaka	—N/a	—N/a
November 21, 2015	Saitama	Japan	Saitama Super Arena	—N/a	—N/a
November 22, 2015	Saitama	Japan	Saitama Super Arena	—N/a	—N/a
March 26, 2016 (Note: The March 26, 2016, concert in Dubai, United Arab Emirates at Meydan Racecourse is a part of Dubai World Cup.)	Dubai	United Arab Emirates	Meydan Racecourse	—N/a	—N/a
Total				131,604 / 138,815 (97%)	$10,839,789

== Cancelled shows ==
List of cancelled concerts, showing date, city, country, venue and reason for cancellation
Date	City	Country	Venue	Reason
March 30, 2016	Birmingham	England	Barclaycard Arena	Pregnancy
March 31, 2016	London	England	The O_{2} Arena	Pregnancy
April 2, 2016	Dublin	Ireland	3Arena	Pregnancy
April 4, 2016	Glasgow	Scotland	The SSE Hydro	Pregnancy
April 5, 2016	Manchester	England	Manchester Arena	Pregnancy
April 10, 2016	Paris	France	AccorHotels Arena	Pregnancy
April 11, 2016	Zürich	Switzerland	Hallenstadion	Pregnancy
April 13, 2016	Hamburg	Germany	Barclaycard Arena	Pregnancy
April 14, 2016	Frankfurt	Germany	Festhalle Frankfurt	Pregnancy
April 16, 2016	Düsseldorf	Germany	Mitsubishi Electric Halle	Pregnancy
April 18, 2016	Berlin	Germany	Max-Schmeling-Halle	Pregnancy
April 20, 2016	Prague	Czech Republic	O_{2} Arena	Pregnancy
April 22, 2016	Kaunas	Lithuania	Žalgirio Arena	Pregnancy
April 23, 2016	Tallinn	Estonia	Saku Suurhall	Pregnancy
April 25, 2016	Helsinki	Finland	Hartwall Arena	Pregnancy
April 27, 2016	Stockholm	Sweden	Hovet	Pregnancy
April 28, 2016	Oslo	Norway	Oslo Spektrum	Pregnancy
April 30, 2016	Copenhagen	Denmark	Forum Copenhagen	Pregnancy
May 2, 2016	Amsterdam	Netherlands	Ziggo Dome	Pregnancy
May 3, 2016	Antwerp	Belgium	Sportpaleis	Pregnancy
May 23, 2016	Tucson	United States	Tucson Arena	Pregnancy
June 14, 2016	Hershey	United States	Giant Center	Pregnancy
June 15, 2016	Rochester	United States	Blue Cross Arena	Pregnancy
June 17, 2016	Montreal	Canada	Bell Centre	Pregnancy
June 18, 2016	London	Canada	Budweiser Gardens	Pregnancy
June 24, 2016	Holmdel	United States	PNC Bank Arts Center	Pregnancy
June 25, 2016	Wantagh	United States	Nikon at Jones Beach Theater	Pregnancy
August 10, 2016	Winston-Salem	United States	LJVM Coliseum	Pregnancy
August 21, 2016	Hartford	United States	XL Center	Pregnancy
