= Rhythm Nation =

1989 single by Janet Jackson

Single by Janet Jackson

from the album Janet Jackson's Rhythm Nation 1814
- Released: October 23, 1989
- Recorded: January 1989
- Studio: Flyte Tyme (Minneapolis, Minnesota)
- Genre: Pop, new jack swing, dance-pop, funk-pop
- Length: 5:31
- Label: A&M
- Songwriters: Janet Jackson; James Harris III; Terry Lewis
- Producers: Jimmy Jam and Terry Lewis; Janet Jackson

Janet Jackson singles chronology
"Miss You Much" (1989)	"Rhythm Nation" (1989)	"Escapade" (1990)

Music video
- "Rhythm Nation" on YouTube

"Rhythm Nation" is a song by American singer Janet Jackson, released in October 1989 by A&M Records as the second single from her fourth studio album, Janet Jackson's Rhythm Nation 1814 (1989). It was written and produced by Jackson, in collaboration with Jimmy Jam and Terry Lewis. Jackson developed the song's concept in response to various tragedies in the media, deciding to pursue a socially conscious theme by using a political standpoint within upbeat dance music. In the United States, it peaked at number two on the Billboard Hot 100 and topped the Hot Black Singles and Dance Club Play charts. It also peaked within the top 40 of several singles charts worldwide. "Rhythm Nation" received several accolades, including BMI Pop Awards for "Most Played Song", the Billboard Award for "Top Dance/Club Play Single" and a Grammy nomination for Jackson as "Producer of the Year". It has been included in two of Jackson's greatest hits collections, Design of a Decade: 1986–1996 (1995) and Number Ones (2009).

The music video for "Rhythm Nation" was directed by Dominic Sena and choreographed by Jackson and a then-unknown Anthony Thomas. It served as the final segment in Jackson's Rhythm Nation 1814 film. It portrays rapid choreography within a "post-apocalyptic" warehouse setting, with Jackson and her dancers adorned in unisex military attire. It was filmed in black-and-white to portray the song's theme of racial harmony. Jackson's record label attempted to persuade her against filming the video, but upon her insistence it became "the most far-reaching single project the company has ever attempted." The video received two MTV Video Music Awards for "Best Choreography" and "Best Dance Video." Jackson also won the Billboard Award for "Best Female Video Artist" in addition to the "Director's Award" and "Music Video Award for Artistic Achievement." The Rhythm Nation 1814 film won the Grammy Award for Best Long Form Music Video. The video's outfit was inducted into the National Museum of Women in the Arts and Rock & Roll Hall of Fame, where its hand-written lyrics are also used in the museum's class on female songwriters.

Artists such as Sleigh Bells, Jamie Lidell, and Kylie Minogue have cited the song as an influence, while artists including Lady Gaga, Peter Andre, OK Go, Mickey Avalon, Usher, Keri Hilson, and Britney Spears have referenced its music video. Beyoncé, Cheryl Cole, Rihanna and Ciara have also paid homage to its outfit and choreography within live performances. It has inspired the careers of choreographers such as Darrin Henson and Travis Payne. Actors including Kate Hudson, Michael K. Williams, and Elizabeth Mathis have studied its music video, with its choreography also used in the film Tron: Legacy. It has been covered by Pink, Crystal Kay, and Girls' Generation and has also been performed on Glee, The X Factor USA, and Britain's Got Talent.

== Background ==
Upon recording her fourth studio album, Jackson was inspired to cover socially conscious issues as a response to various tragedies in the media. Producer Jimmy Jam stated, "Janet came up with the 'Rhythm Nation' concept. A lot of it had to do with watching TV. We're avid TV watchers, and we would watch MTV, then switch over to CNN, and there'd always be something messed-up happening. It was never good news, always bad news." She was particularly saddened by the Stockton playground murders, leading her to record "Livin' in a World (They Didn't Make)." She decided to pursue additional songs with a similar concept, focusing on a political standpoint within energetic dance music. The song's lyrics were written as a montage of racial unity with Jackson's passion for dance, envisioning a colorblind world sharing the same beliefs. Jam explained:

We wanted something to do with rhythm, because that's what Janet's life is about: beat, rhythm. One night over dinner, Janet said, "rhythm nation." I told Terry, and he just sang the melody, "We are part of the rhythm nation." And then I hit, "The people of the world today, searching for a better way of life", and Janet sings, "Rhythm Nation." And it just all came together.

We have so little time to solve these problems. I want people to realize the urgency. I want to grab their attention. Music is my way of doing that. It's okay to have fun — I want to be certain that point is clear. I have fun. Dancing is fun. Dancing is healthy. It pleases me when the kids say my stuff is kickin', but it pleases me even more when they listen to the lyrics. The lyrics mean so much to me.

— Jackson on the concept of "Rhythm Nation."

Jackson jokingly considered it a "national anthem for the Nineties", leading her to develop Rhythm Nation 1814, titled after the year "The Star-Spangled Banner" was written. She derived its lyrical theme from the diversity amongst society, which she observed to be united by music. Jackson said, "I realized that among my friends, we actually had a distinct 'nation' of our own. We weren't interested in drugs or drinking but social change. We also loved music and loved to dance... that's how Rhythm Nation 1814 was born." She also likened its concept to the various groups formed among youth, asserting a common identity and bond, saying, "I thought it would be great if we could create our own nation. One that would have a positive message and that everyone would be free to join." Jackson also commented, "I found it so intriguing that everyone united through whatever the link was. And I felt that with most of my friends. Most people think that my closest friends are in the [entertainment] business, and they're not. They're roller-skating rink guards, waitresses, one works for a messenger service. They have minimum-wage paying jobs. And the one thing that we all have in common is music. I know that within our little group, there is a rhythm nation that exists."

Jackson desired the song's theme to capture the attention of her teenage audience, who were potentially unaware of socially conscious themes. She commented, "I wanted to take our message directly to the kids, and the way to do that is by making music you can really dance to. That was our whole goal: How can I get through to the kids with this?" She became encouraged by artists such as Marvin Gaye, Bob Dylan, and Joni Mitchell, feeling as if their demographics were already familiar with social themes. Jackson said, "These were people who woke me up to the responsibility of music. They were beautiful singers and writers who felt for others. They understood suffering." Upon questioning, Jackson said, "I know I can't change the world single-handedly, but for those who are on the fence, maybe I can lead them in a positive direction... If I just touched one person, just to make that difference, make them change for the better, that's an accomplishment." Jackson also responded to potential ridicule, stating, "a lot of people have said, "She's not being realistic with this Rhythm Nation. It's like 'Oh, she thinks the world is going to come together through her dance music,' and that's not the case at all. I know a song or an album can't change the world. But there's nothing wrong with doing what we're doing to help spread the message." Jackson added, "If personal freedom has political implications and if pleasure must be part of any meaningful solution—and it really must—there's nothing wrong with it at all."

== Composition ==
"Rhythm Nation"

The distinctive guitar riff was based on "Thank You (Falettinme Be Mice Elf Again)" by Sly and the Family Stone. Its socially conscious lyrics preach racial harmony and leadership through dance, anti-fascism, protesting bigotry, and geographic boundaries with "compassionate, dedicated people power." It uses a moderate funk tempo composed in the key of E minor. Jackson's vocals range from C_{4} to A_{5}, climaxing during the song's middle eight. It opens with prelude "Pledge", in which Jackson describes "a world rid of color-lines" over apocalyptic bells and ambient noise. According to The New York Times' writer Stephen Holden, the song is an "utopian dance-floor exhortation" whose lyrics "[call] for racial harmony and cooperative struggle to create a better, stronger world". Its chorus is supported by male voices, with Jackson addressing her audience in a similar vein to a politician, "abandoning the narrow I for the universal we and inviting us to do the same." Its final chorus closes with multiple ad-libs as Jackson encourages listeners to sing with her, spreading the song's message of multicultural solidarity in a "grand pop statement."

== Critical reception ==
"Rhythm Nation" received positive reviews from critics, garnering praise for its lyrical theme. Rolling Stone declared it the album's "essential moment", describing the song as "a headbanging good time." Stephen Holden of The New York Times called it a "militantly utopian dance-floor exhortation." Michael Saunders of The Sun Sentinel declared it "upbeat funk-pop" which showcased Jackson's "light, breathy voice."

Sputnik Music applauded its "extraordinary" production and chorus, thought to result in "a catchy, smart single which would appease the Jackson haters and delight the fans." People specified its "burnin' hunk o' funk guitar riff". Entertainment Weekly declared it a "paean to the human spirit", likened to "a chorus line of stormtroopers." Vince Aletti of Rolling Stone described the song as a "densely textured, agitated track" propelled by "syncopated yelps" of unity.

=== Theme reception ===
Vince Aletti considered its message "dedicated" and "compassionate", praising its concept of a "multiracial, multinational network." He added, "Jackson addresses her constituency the way a politician might, abandoning the narrow I for the universal we and inviting us to do the same." Sal Cinquemani of Slant Magazine described it as a "socially charged calls to arms", promoting a "Zen-like transcendence of self." Its lyrics were regarded to call for "social justice" rather than personal freedom, focusing on "strength in numbers" and "unity through mandatory multiculturalism." In May 2016, Entertainment Weekly ranked "Rhythm Nation" as the best Janet Jackson song of all time, commenting, "it rode to the new jack swing of its era, but this industrial-edged anthem ... is one of the most radical hits ever by a pop diva. It broke all of the lines, color and otherwise, high-stepping all the way. Richard Croft called it "a protest song with a twist", commending its description of how change can be made rather than questioning why it hasn't occurred. Women, Politics, and Popular Culture author Lilly Goren considered it to reflect "politically driven feminist messages." Chris Willman of Los Angeles Times proposed its theme "big on community, stressing social consciousness for a young target audience and proposing a prejudice-free" nation. An additional review stated, "[Janet] wanted social justice and voiced it in one of the most fabulous, bad ass ways possible."

Jon Pareles of The New York Times praised its "earnest concern", also noting its "call for unity and good intentions." Its preach of racial unity was applauded, thought to unite "Ms. Jackson's opposition to racism with an image of a mass audience." The publication also observed Jackson to eagerly "rail against societal ills like racism and domestic abuse." Additionally, it was used as an example of a socially conscious song having influence over the public, thought to effectively call for "racial harmony and cooperative struggle to create a better, stronger world." Pareles added Jackson "kept the propulsive funk and added worthy, generalized social messages". An anecdote likened its theme of peace to the teachings of social activist Mahatma Gandhi, saying, ""Rhythm Nation" sheds light on the problem of apathy, which is common among young people today." Jackson's conscious lyrics and desire to "not only entertain, but to educate" was praised, concluding, "["Rhythm Nation"] speaks particularly to young people and encourages them to be the leaders of tomorrow."

== Commercial performance ==
"Rhythm Nation" debuted at number 49 on the Billboard Hot 100 for the week of November 11, 1989. It was the week's highest new entry, breaking Madonna's consecutive streak of Hot Shot Debuts on the chart. The song peaked at number two on the Billboard Hot 100 on January 6, 1990, for two consecutive weeks. It also reached number two on the Mainstream Top 40 chart and reached number one on the ATV Top 40 in addition to the Hot Black Singles and Dance Club Play charts, topping the former chart for a single week (January 13, 1990), and the latter chart for three weeks. "Rhythm Nation" was certified Gold by the Recording Industry of America (RIAA) on January 16, 1990. Internationally, the single reached number two in Canada, number nine in the Netherlands, number 17 in New Zealand, number 19 in Ireland, number 22 in Switzerland, number 23 on the United Kingdom singles chart, and number 56 in Australia.

== Music video ==
Jackson performing in the music video for "Rhythm Nation", with dancers all outfitted in unisex black military-style uniforms

The music video for "Rhythm Nation" was directed by American director Dominic Sena. It was the final inclusion in Jackson's Rhythm Nation 1814 film, following "Miss You Much" and "The Knowledge." Its premise focuses on rapid choreography within a "post-apocalyptic" warehouse setting, with Jackson and her dancers outfitted in unisex black military-style uniforms. It was filmed in black-and-white to portray the song's theme of racial harmony. Jackson stated, "There were so many races in that video, from Black to White and all the shades of gray in between. Black-and-white photography shows all those shades, and that's why we used it." Its wardrobe also reflects the song's theme of gender equality, using matching unisex outfits. Jackson commented, "The foggy, smoky street and the dark, black-and-white tone, that was all intentional. When you've done a lot of videos, it can be difficult to keep it fresh and new. You have to try something you've never done, in fear of looking like something you've already created."

While developing its concept, Jackson's record label attempted to persuade her against filming the video, feeling as if it didn't have mainstream appeal. Upon her insistence, it became "the most far-reaching single project the company has ever attempted." The video received multiple accolades, including MTV Video Music Awards for Best Choreography and Best Dance Video at the 1990 MTV Video Music Awards. Jackson was also the recipient of the Director's Award, Best Female Video Artist, and the Music Video Award for Artistic Achievement at the 1990 Billboard Music Awards. The film won a Grammy Award for Best Long Form Music Video at the 32nd Annual Grammy Awards. It was later listed among the "Greatest Music Videos of All Time" by Slant Magazine. Entertainment Weekly considered it "legendary" while Rolling Stone declared it "the gold standard for dystopian dance-pop music videos", thought to include "the most memorable choreography in pop video history." MTV News commended it as "the clip that sent Jackson into the stratosphere as an envelope-pushing pop star." The video's outfit is included in the Rock & Roll Hall of Fame's "Women Who Rock: Vision, Passion, Power" exhibit and the National Museum of Women in the Arts, and was previously displayed on a statue at Walt Disney World theme park

== Live performances ==
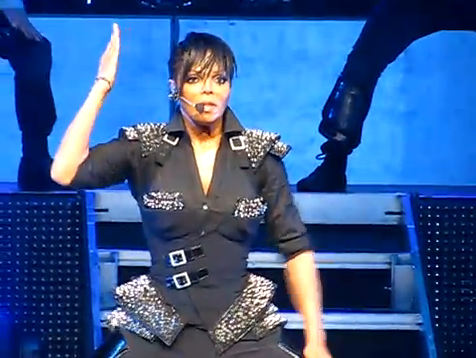
Jackson performing "Rhythm Nation" on Number Ones, Up Close and Personal

During its initial promotion, "Rhythm Nation" was performed on Top of the Pops and TV Plus, in addition to Germany's Countdown and Peter's Pop Show. It was also performed for Queen Elizabeth II and the Royal Family at a Royal Variety Performance. Jackson's pants split during the performance due to its intense choreography. It was performed on The Ellen DeGeneres Show and America United: In Support of Our Troops concert during promotion for her tenth album, Discipline. The song was notoriously performed with "All for You" and an excerpt of "The Knowledge" at the Super Bowl XXXVIII halftime show, in which Jackson's breast was accidentally exposed by Justin Timberlake. The performance led to the inspiration for YouTube and launch of Facebook, also becoming the most watched, recorded, and replayed event in television history. It also set a record for Jackson as the most searched term and image in internet history.

"Rhythm Nation" has been performed on all of her following tours. On the Rhythm Nation Tour, Jackson's performance was described as "a wedge of hard-driving bodies moves like a robot battalion in precision drill." Jackson's outfit had been "mimicked by many of her fans" throughout the tour. Observing its routine, The New York Times stated, "Legs chop wide open, then close again. They shoot out abruptly to the sides, then kick into jazz spins and bouncing splits to the floor. There are sedate pelvic jerks and a swiveling turn on a toe, trotting runs and purposeful syncopated walks. But essentially these are bodies rooted into the floor, taut yet alive in the way of a boxer edgily biding his time in the ring." A live rendition from the janet. World Tour was aired on MTV.

The Velvet Rope Tour was reported to feature "the characteristic, Russian-style military suit she wore in the video, corresponding with the song's rigid, robotic dance movements." Los Angeles Times regarded her "a human musical medley", while The Daily Telegraph considered it "show-stopping" for its display of "hyperbolic tension." Jackson's rendition on the All for You Tour was described as a "neon-lit number straight out of Blade Runner." Rolling Stone declared it "stunning", adding, "even near the end of the two-hour show, her voice was unwaveringly powerful, carrying the "Sing it people/Sing it children" lines like a flag on the Fourth of July." Jackson's dancers emulated "animated toys and storybook figures" in catsuits, performing robotic moves against "structured, sassy beats." On Number Ones, Up Close and Personal, Jackson's rendition was also praised, as she "sliced her way through tight, sharp choreography." Alexis Petridis of The Guardian called it "ferocious", adding, "if she wanted to remind people how commanding a presence she can be, she's done her job." Jackson also included the song on her 2015–16 Unbreakable World Tour; Jon Pareles of The New York Times, wrote that "as the concert neared its end, Ms. Jackson moved from the personal to the communal, summoning the staccato funk and calls for collective action of 'Rhythm Nation'. Suddenly, the number of onstage dancers more than doubled, all moving in sync". She also has included the song on her 2017–2019 State of the World Tour, 2019 Las Vegas residency Janet Jackson: Metamorphosis, 2023–2024 tour Janet Jackson: Together Again and current 2024–2025 residency Janet Jackson: Las Vegas. It was also included on her special concert series Janet Jackson: A Special 30th Anniversary Celebration of Rhythm Nation in 2019.

== Influence ==
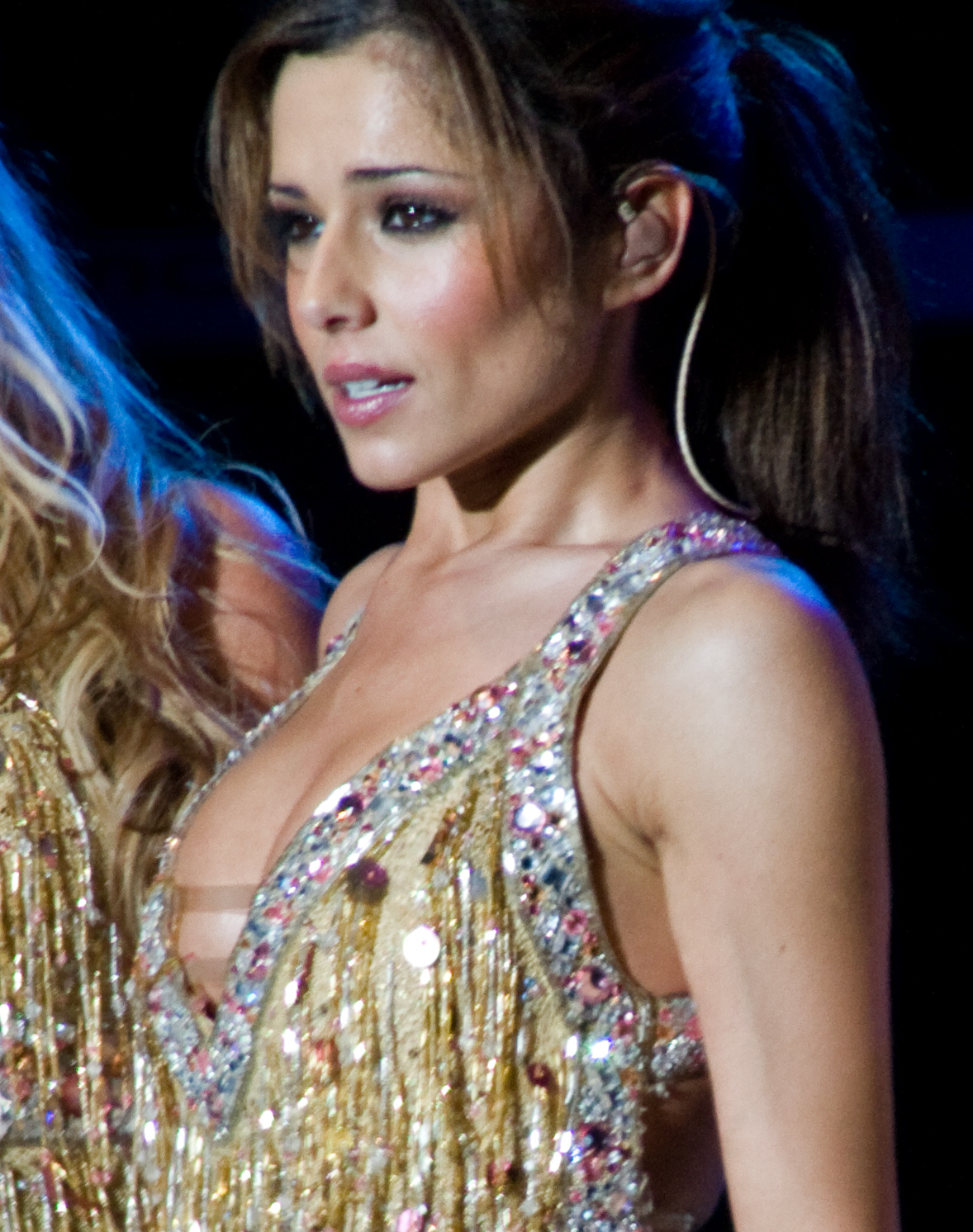
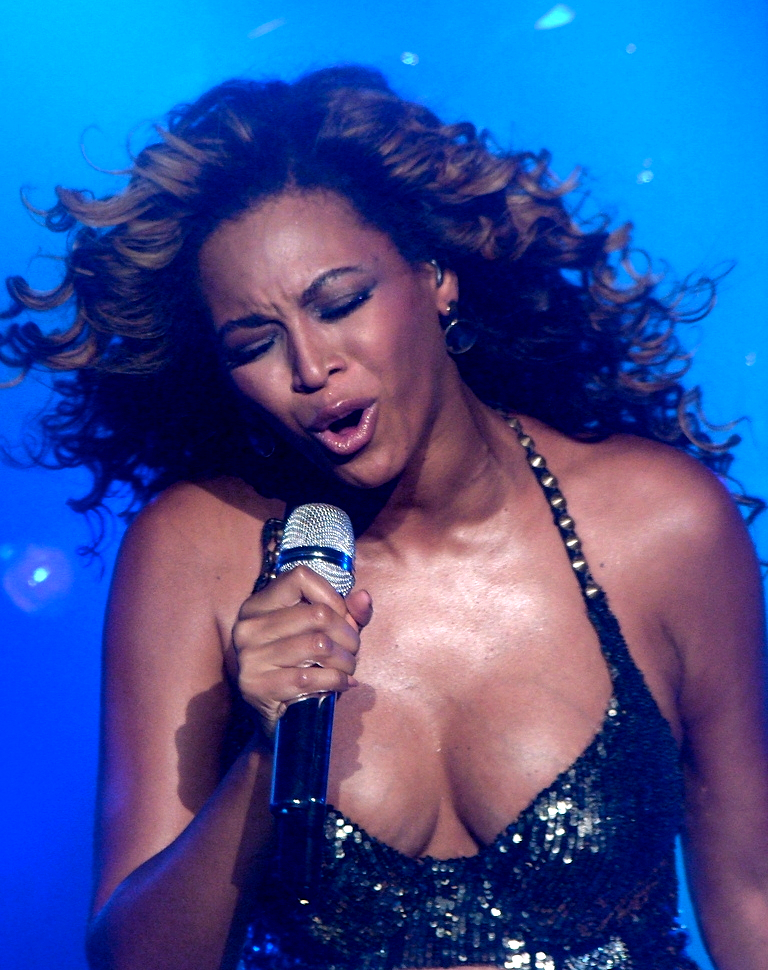
"Rhythm Nation" has influenced performances by artists such as Cheryl Cole and Beyoncé.

"Rhythm Nation" has been cited to influence various artists within its production, lyrical theme and vocal arrangement. Its music video has also been considered among the most influential in popular culture. Rolling Stone observed it to "set the template for hundreds of videos to come in the Nineties and aughts", with Entertainment Weekly also declaring it "groundbreaking", in addition to "striking, timeless and instantly recognizable." Mike Weaver stated Jackson's "one-of-a-kind, funk-and-groove choreography was unlike anything seen in the history of pop music. ... every show choir and every hiphop dancer wanted to cut and paste parts and pieces of the Rhythm Nation production into their set." Regarding its influence, Sherri Winston of The Sun Sentinel stated, "No one can witness the militaristic precision of Rhythm Nation, which gives the impression that a really angry pep squad has taken over the dance floor, and not see how Janet's style has been sampled, borrowed and stolen over and over ... and over."

The song has inspired artists such as Sleigh Bells, Jamie Lidell, Kylie Minogue, and record producer Yoo Young-jin. Various aspects of its music video have been referenced by numerous artists, including Britney Spears, Justin Timberlake Lady Gaga, Peter Andre, OK Go, Nicki Minaj, Usher, and Jessie Ware. Its outfit and choreography has been paid homage to in performances by Spears, Beyoncé, Cheryl Cole, and Rihanna. In film, actors such as Kate Hudson, Michael K. Williams, and Elizabeth Mathis have studied its music video, with Mathis notably using its choreography during a scene in Tron: Legacy. Choreographers such as Travis Payne and Wade Robson have called it a primary influence to their careers. Aylin Zatar of BuzzFeed remarked, "She also basically pioneered the dancing in a warehouse, post-apocalyptic, industrial setting video. So, Britney ("Till The World Ends"), Rihanna ("Hard"), Lady Gaga ("Alejandro"), and even the Spice Girls ("Spice Up Your Life") – you all have Ms. Jackson to thank."

== Covers ==
Jacob Artist, Melissa Benoist, and Erinn Westbrook covered "Rhythm Nation" in a mashup with "Nasty" during the fifth season of Glee, in the episode "Puppet Master." Pink covered "Rhythm Nation" for both the opening medley and in the finale medley with Queen and David Bowie's "Under Pressure" for the film Happy Feet Two. Japanese singer Crystal Kay performed a Japanese rendition of the song for the Japanese version of the film. Girls' Generation performed the song on KBS Song Festival and their debut concert tour, Girls' Generation Asia Tour Into the New World. Korean pop group After School covered the song on music show Kim Jung-eun's Chocolate. American electronic musician Oneohtrix Point Never composed a cover of the song with choral arrangements by Thomas Roussel for Kenzo's Fall/Winter 2016 collection at Paris Fashion Week.

The Stereo Hogzz performed a live rendition and replicated its choreography during the first season of The X Factor. English dance troupe Diversity incorporated its choreography during a performance on the third season finale of Britain's Got Talent. It was also performed on America's Best Dance Crew and Britain's Stars in Their Eyes. Pink, Usher, and Mýa performed a dance tribute to "Rhythm Nation" on Jackson's MTV Icon special. Filipino singer Jaya included a live cover on the album Jaya Live at the Araneta. The song's countdown is used in various releases of the video game NBA Live.

== Awards and accolades ==
"Rhythm Nation" won a Billboard Music Award for "Top Dance/Club Play Single of the Year", with Jackson also winning "Best Female Artist, Dance", "Best Female Video Artist", "Director's Award", and the "Music Video Award for Artistic Achievement." The song also won a BMI Pop Award for "Most Played Song", in addition to awarding her "Songwriter of the Year." Jackson received a Grammy Award nomination for "Producer of the Year, Non-Classical", with its full-length music video winning "Best Long Form Music Video." Slant Magazine included it among the "Greatest Dance Songs of All Time" and "Greatest Music Videos of All Time." VH1 ranked its music video among their "Greatest Videos." The video also won two MTV Video Music Awards for "Best Choreography" and "Best Dance Video", with Jackson awarded the Video Vanguard Award for her contributions to popular culture. The song is performed at Las Vegas' Legends in Concert series. The hand-written lyrics to "Rhythm Nation" and the music video's outfit are included in the Rock and Roll Hall of Fame's "Women Who Rock: Vision, Passion, Power" exhibit, with its lyrics also used in the museum's course on feminist songwriters. In 2021, it was listed at No. 475 on Rolling Stone's "Top 500 Best Songs of All Time".

List of accolades for "Rhythm Nation"

Award	Nominated work	Result
Billboard Music Awards	Director's Award	Won
Billboard Music Awards	Top Dance/Club Play Single of the Year	Won
Billboard Music Awards	Best Female Video Artist	Won
Billboard Music Awards	Best Female Artist, Dance	Won
Billboard Music Awards	Tanqueray Sterling Music Video Award for Artistic Achievement	Won
BMI Pop Awards	Most Played Song	Won
BMI Pop Awards	Songwriter of the Year	Won
Grammy Awards	Best Music Video, Long Form — Rhythm Nation 1814	Won
Grammy Awards	Producer of the Year, Non-Classical — Janet Jackson	Nominated
Legends in Concert	Janet Jackson and "Rhythm Nation"	—N/a
MTV	Bust Up: Best Dance Video Ever	Won
MTV Video Music Awards	Best Choreography in a Video	Won
MTV Video Music Awards	Best Dance Video	Won
MTV Video Music Awards	Video Vanguard Award	Won
National Museum of Women in the Arts	"Rhythm Nation" outfit	Won
Rock and Roll Hall of Fame	"Women Who Rock: Vision, Passion, Power" Exhibit — "Rhythm Nation" outfit and lyrics (2011)	—N/a
Rock and Roll Hall of Fame	"Women Who Rock: Vision, Passion, Power" songwriting exhibit — "Rhythm Nation" (2011)	—N/a
Rolling Stone	Ten Best Apocalyptic Dance Music Videos — #1 (2011)	Won
Slant Magazine	Greatest Dance Songs of All Time — #21	—N/a
Slant Magazine	Greatest Music Videos of All Time	—N/a
Soul Train Awards	Music Video of the Year	Won

== Legacy ==
The song exhorts social change in the face of injustice, using music – and by extension, rhythm – as a unifying tool. It's the perfect platform to talk about song structure (verse, chorus, bridge, etc.) More important, "Rhythm Nation" provides a unique point of view from which to draw conclusions about its author and her era.

— Kathryn Metz on the song's inclusion in the Rock and Roll Hall of Fame.

"Rhythm Nation" is among Jackson's signature songs, commended for its lyrical theme and innovative production. Jackson commented, "When I first proposed a socially conscious concept, there were voices of doubt. But the more I thought about it, the more committed I became, I no longer had a choice. The creativity took over, "Rhythm Nation" came alive. I saw that a higher power was at work." Jon Pareles declared it "one of the more innovative Top 10 hits of the 1980's", while Yahoo! Music called it "revolutionary" and "militaristic." Michael Saunders considered it among Jackson's repertoire of "skillfully packaged pop songs that have made her one of the biggest-selling performers in popdom." Jimmy Jam stated, "Janet has said a million times, "You're not going to change anybody. But if you've got somebody on the fence, and they're at that point when they're either going to go one way or another, then a little nudge in that direction ain't gonna hurt." So that's all you're trying to do. And it's cool to do that. It's cool to do that and have a hit."

Slant Magazine ranked it among the best singles of the 1980s, saying, "the music is militant and regimented, with beats that fire like artillery juxtaposed with the typically thin-voiced Janet's unbridled vocal performance." The publication added, "Rhythm Nation" makes its statement without relying on schmaltz; it's no wonder why big brother Mike was envious of it." The song was later ranked number twenty-one on their list of "100 Greatest Dance Songs", praising Jackson's "guarded political optimism into a direct attack on the 1980s' culture of indifference." Richard Croft praised its "powerful" production, declaring, "the beats on this song are probably the most powerful ever to be heard in the history of mankind." Another critique declared it "the best song Janet has ever done", praising its "mission statement" in addition to its "frantic beats, the message, the determined vocal performance, the lyrics and the explosive chorus", adding "There are few moments in pop music as thrilling as the transition of the dance breakdown into the final choruses, complete with Janet going nuts over the ad-libs, as if she was in a trance brought on but just how beyond amazing this song is. And that's not even mentioning the incredible video."

=== Philanthropy ===
Through words and deeds, Janet has set an example of generosity, of empowerment, of tolerance, while leading an array of efforts addressing some of society's greatest challenges.

— Kam Williams on Jackson's philanthropy.

Jackson founded the "Rhythm Nation Scholarship", assisting students in meeting their academic goals. The monetary award is given to students who have demonstrated high academic achievement or have been actively involved within their school or community. She received the Chairman's Award at the NAACP Awards for her work regarding illiteracy, drug abuse, violence, and high school dropout prevention. In response to a critic who said her socially conscious lyrics could accomplish "nothing", Jackson invited two high school graduates to the stage, who both had previously credited the song and its music video as the motivation for staying in school. Various portions of the "Rhythm Nation" outfit were donated to charity, including the Music Against AIDS auction. A tribute band known as "Rhythm Nation" performs at various fundraisers, including benefits for children with cancer at the Ronald McDonald House in New York City.

== Effect of resonant frequencies ==
In August 2022, Microsoft engineer Raymond Chen published an article detailing how playing the music video on or nearby certain laptops would cause a crash. The song contains one of the natural resonant frequencies to some 5400 RPM OEM-laptop hard drives used around the year 2005. This vulnerability was assigned a CVE ID of CVE-2022-38392, which describes a possible denial of service attack, and references Raymond Chen's blog post. YouTuber Adam Neely traced the song's resonant peak at 84.2 Hz, which he hypothesized as the combination of the song's bassline at the note E with a possible use of pitch control to increase the speed and pitch of the song during production, as the source of the offending resonant frequency.

== Official versions and remixes ==
- Album Version – 5:30
- LP Version – 4:42
- Design of a Decade US Edit – 5:58
- 7" Edit – 4:27
- Instrumental – 4:44
- 7" CHR Remix – 4:06
- Rhythm Mix – 4:48
- 7" United Mix Edit – 4:34
- 12" United Mix – 6:35
- 12" United Dub – 6:11
- 7" House Nation Edit – 4:23
- 12" House Nation Mix – 8:07
- House Nation Groove – 6:45
- Lee Groves' Super Bowl XXXVIII Remix (Unreleased)

== Track listings ==
US promo CD

1. "Rhythm Nation" (edit) – 4:28
2. "Rhythm Nation" (LP version) – 4:40
3. "Rhythm Nation" (instrumental) – 4:44

Canadian cassette single, European 7-inch single, and Japanese mini-CD single

1. "Rhythm Nation" (edit)
2. "Rhythm Nation" (instrumental)

Canadian and European 12-inch single

A1. "Rhythm Nation" (12-inch United Mix) – 6:35
A2. "Rhythm Nation" (United Dub) – 6:09
A3. "Rhythm Nation" (7-inch edit of LP version) – 4:28
B1. "Rhythm Nation" (12-inch House Nation Mix) – 8:06
B2. "Rhythm Nation" (House Nation Groove Mix) – 6:42
B3. "Rhythm Nation" (7-inch instrumental) – 4:44

UK CD single

1. "Rhythm Nation" (7-inch edit)
2. "Rhythm Nation" (12-inch House Nation Mix)
3. "Rhythm Nation" (12-inch United Dub)

UK 12-inch single

A1. "Rhythm Nation" (12-inch House Nation Mix)
B1. "Rhythm Nation" (12-inch United Mix)
B2. "Rhythm Nation" (United Dub)

UK cassette single

1. "Rhythm Nation" (7-inch edit)
2. "Rhythm Nation" (CHR Remix)

European CD single

1. "Rhythm Nation" (7-inch edit) – 4:28
2. "Rhythm Nation" (7-inch United Edit) – 4:22
3. "Rhythm Nation" (12-inch United Mix) – 6:35
4. "Rhythm Nation" (instrumental) – 4:44

Japanese CD maxi-single

1. "Rhythm Nation" (7-inch edit)
2. "Rhythm Nation" (12-inch United Mix)
3. "Rhythm Nation" (12-inch House Nation Mix)
4. "Rhythm Nation" (House Nation Groove)
5. "Rhythm Nation" (United Dub)
6. "Rhythm Nation" (7-inch CHR Remix)
7. "Rhythm Nation" (7-inch United Mix Edit)
8. "Rhythm Nation" (7-inch House Nation Edit)
9. "Rhythm Nation" (LP version)
10. "Rhythm Nation" (instrumental 7-inch)
11. "Rhythm Nation" (Rhythm Mix)
- The song is written as "リズム・ネイション" in Japan.

== Charts ==
=== Weekly charts ===
Chart (1989–1990)	Peak position
Australia (ARIA)	56
Belgium (Ultratop 50 Flanders)	24
Canada Retail Singles (The Record)	2
Canada Top Singles (RPM)	6
Canada Dance/Urban (RPM)	3
Europe (European Hot 100 Singles)	76
Ireland (IRMA)	19
Japan (Oricon)	84
Luxembourg (Radio Luxembourg)	17
Netherlands (Dutch Top 40)	11
Netherlands (Single Top 100)	9
New Zealand (Recorded Music NZ)	17
South Africa (Mediaguide)	2
Switzerland (Schweizer Hitparade)	22
UK Singles (Official Charts)	23
US Billboard Hot 100	2
US Dance Club Songs (Billboard)	1
US Dance Singles Sales (Billboard)	2
US Hot Black Singles (Billboard)	1
US Cash Box Top 100	3
US Contemporary Hit Radio (Radio & Records)	2
US Urban (Radio & Records)	1
West Germany (GfK)	83

=== Year-end charts ===
Chart (1990)	Position
Canada Top Singles (RPM)	79
Canada Dance/Urban (RPM)	44
US Billboard Hot 100	38
US 12-inch Singles Sales (Billboard)	9
US Dance Club Play (Billboard)	4
US Hot Black Singles (Billboard)	32
US Contemporary Hit Radio (Radio & Records)	81
US Urban (Radio & Records)	89

== Certifications ==
Region	Certification	Certified units/sales
United States (RIAA)	Platinum	1,000,000^{‡}
^{‡} Sales+streaming figures based on certification alone.

== Release history ==
Region	Date	Format(s)	Label(s)	Ref.
United Kingdom	October 23, 1989	7-inch vinyl; 12-inch vinyl; CD; cassette	A&M; Breakout	
United Kingdom	October 30, 1989	12-inch picture disc	A&M; Breakout	
Japan	November 21, 1989	Mini-CD	A&M	
Japan	March 21, 1990	Maxi-CD	A&M	

== See also ==
- List of number-one dance singles of 1989 (U.S.)
- List of number-one dance singles of 1990 (U.S.)
- R&B number-one hits of 1990 (USA)
