= Funny How Time Flies (When You're Having Fun) =

Single by Janet Jackson

from the album Control
- B-side: "When I Think of You"
- Released: November 2, 1987
- Recorded: 1985
- Studio: Flyte Tyme, Minneapolis, Minnesota
- Genre: Quiet storm; pop; soul
- Length: 4:29
- Label: A&M
- Songwriters: James Harris; Terry Lewis; Janet Jackson
- Producers: Jimmy Jam and Terry Lewis

Janet Jackson singles chronology
"Making Love in the Rain" (1987)	"Funny How Time Flies (When You're Having Fun)" (1987)	"Miss You Much" (1989)

Professional ratings
Review scores
Source	Rating
Number One	4/5 stars

"Funny How Time Flies (When You're Having Fun)" is a song by American singer Janet Jackson, released on November 2, 1987 by A&M Records as the seventh and final single from her third studio album Control (1986). Written by Jackson and collaborators Jimmy Jam and Terry Lewis and produced by the latter duo, the song has musical similarities to her brother Michael's song "The Lady In My Life" from his 1982 album Thriller. While the single was officially released in the United Kingdom and Australia, reaching number 59 on the UK Singles Chart and number 24 on the Irish Singles Chart, it was released solely for airplay in the United States and was thus ineligible to chart in that country. No music video was filmed for the single.

Jazz musician Stanley Clarke covered the song for his 1988 album If This Bass Could Only Talk. The song was also sampled on The Lost Boyz's "Renee" and on Camp Lo's "Coolie High", both from 1996. In 2014, it was sampled on Tinashe's "How Many Times" featuring Future from her debut album Aquarius. Two years later, it was sampled on SWV's "MCE (Man Crush Everyday)". JPEGMafia sampled the song on his 2024 track "I Recovered From This" off his album I Lay Down My Life for You. The following year, Cardi B sampled and interpolated the song's introduction for her track "On My Back" featuring Lourdiz from her sophomore album Am I the Drama?.

== Live performances ==
Jackson included the song as an instrumental interlude on her Rhythm Nation World Tour 1990. She performed the full song on her 2008 Rock Witchu Tour. Jackson also included the song in her performances at the 2010, 2018, & 2022 Essence Music Festival, held in New Orleans, Louisiana. The song was used as an interlude for the video introduction on the Unbreakable World Tour (2015–2016), and was later included on the second leg of the 2018 State of the World Tour. Jackson included the song at her 2019 Las Vegas residency Janet Jackson: Metamorphosis.

== Track listings ==
- UK and Australian 7-inch single

A. "Funny How Time Flies (When You're Having Fun)" – 4:29
B. "When I Think of You" – 3:57

- UK 12-inch single

A1. "Funny How Time Flies (When You're Having Fun)" – 4:29
A2. "Nasty" (Cool Summer Mix – Part One) – 7:57
B1. "When I Think of You" (Dance Remix) – 6:25

== Charts ==
Chart (1987)	Peak position
Ireland (IRMA)	24
UK Singles (OCC)	59
