= No Sleeep =

Single by Janet Jackson (Album Version featuring J. Cole)

from the album Unbreakable
- Released: June 22, 2015
- Studio: Flyte Tyme Studios (Agoura Hills, CA)
- Genre: R&B; neo soul; quiet storm
- Length: 3:26 (solo version); 4:20 (featuring J. Cole)
- Label: Rhythm Nation; BMG
- Songwriters: Janet Jackson; James Harris III; Terry Lewis
- Producers: Janet Jackson; Jimmy Jam and Terry Lewis

Janet Jackson singles chronology
"Nothing" (2010)	"No Sleeep" (2015)	"Unbreakable" (2015)

J. Cole singles chronology
"Wet Dreamz" (2015)	"No Sleeep" (2015)	"No Role Modelz" (2015)

Music video
- "No Sleeep" on YouTube

"No Sleeep" is a song recorded by American singer-songwriter Janet Jackson for her eleventh studio album Unbreakable (2015). Co-written and produced by Jackson and her long-time collaborators Jimmy Jam and Terry Lewis, it is the first record to be released under Jackson's independent label Rhythm Nation Records, distributed by BMG Rights Management. It was made available as the lead single from the album digitally on June 22, 2015, in addition to vinyl copies being sold on Jackson's official website in conjunction with pre-sale orders for the studio album and Unbreakable World Tour concert tickets. Lyrically, the song depicts Jackson longing to reunite with her lover, anticipating that when she does, the couple will get "no sleep". Due to its slow tempo and sentimentality, it has been described as embodying traits of the quiet storm radio style.

The album version of the song features additional verses from American rapper J. Cole, and was used in the accompanying music video which premiered on July 24, 2015. Directed by Dave Meyers, its minimalist aesthetic and production has been compared to the music video for "That's the Way Love Goes" (1993). Jackson's solo version of the single debuted on the US Billboard Hot 100 at number 67, marking her 40th entry on the chart. It also debuted on the US Hot R&B/Hip-Hop Songs at number 18. The album version featuring J. Cole enabled it to re-enter the Hot 100 with a new peak position at number 63, while also topping the US Adult R&B Songs chart.

== Background ==
In August 2014, producer and engineer Ian Cross confirmed to Barefoot Sound magazine that he was working on Jackson's new album. After Cross' declarations, Jackson herself responded to the rumor, neither confirming nor denying the works: "If there is a new project, you'll hear it from my lips," she tweeted. At midnight on May 16, 2015, Jackson announced plans to release a new album and to embark on a world concert tour, stating "I promised you would hear it from my lips. And now you will. This year, new music, new world tour, a new movement. I've been listening. Let's keep the conversation going." She released her new album in the fall of 2015 under her own record label, Rhythm Nation, distributed by BMG Rights Management. The launch of Rhythm Nation ranks Jackson as among the few African-American women to establish a record label.

In early June 2015, producer Jimmy Jam tweeted, "Early morning #Plush #NoSL333P #ConversationsInACafe," along with a picture of sheet music in a darkened studio. Fans quickly found out the titles "No SL333P" and "plush" in the picture. Later, a snippet of the song was leaked, followed by a countdown on her official website which revealed the song on June 22, 2015. She tweeted "I dedicate this to My Love", referring to then-husband, Wissam Al Mana.

Producer Jimmy Jam later recalled in an interview with Entertainment Weekly that "No Sleeep" almost did not make it into the final track list for Unbreakable. He stated that it "was basically called that because it was like five in the morning, and we had just completed a day of work and I was still awake, so I was playing around with some different stuff and came up with the skeleton of it." Months went by before the initial track was discovered by Lewis and Jackson, at which point Jam recalled: "Terry asked me for a melody, and it evolved from there. Janet loved it—just the feeling that she got when she heard it is the feeling she wanted the fans to have. Just a warm, welcoming, sensual feel. But it was almost forgotten."

== Composition ==
"No Sleeep" is an R&B, neo soul, and quiet storm song, which lyrically finds Jackson crooning about a long-distance romance over "soulful" keyboards and programmed drums. Opening with a sample of pouring rain and distant thunder, the first word heard is "plush", followed by Jackson singing the chorus: "You missing me, I'm missing you, whenever we meet, we ain't gonna get no sleep," in her signature breathy soprano. She also promises to be "the queen of insomnia" in the song. Zach Johnson from E! Online noted that Jackson's vocals are "especially impressive" in the bridge of the song. According to The Guardian, "On first listen it seems to be missing any discernible hooks, but slowly the chorus starts to dig its claws in, while the sudden vocal shift from soft coo to full-bodied yearning in the middle eight is a hairs on the back of the neck moment."

== Critical reception ==
Nolan Feeney, writing for Time magazine, said it "isn't another 'All Nite'-esque banger, but a sexy slow jam about getting quality time with a lover." Vibe remarked: "The mellow soundscape sounds like Janet literally just lit some incense, sat down on the studio floor and let the words flow from her mouth without a second thought." Michael Craigg from The Guardian gave a positive review, calling the song a "slowly unfurling sex jam" and also pointed out that while "the general consensus among pop stars nowadays is that all singles must be at least 124 BPM, Janet's always done things slightly differently," adding that any song which "manages to incorporate the phrase 'fait accompli' into its chorus is on to something." Aisha Harris of Slate states that "Jackson’s soft, cooing vocals ... are left largely untouched, the production uncluttered" and favorably compared the song to material from the singer's 1997 studio album The Velvet Rope. Similarly, Pitchfork Media's Meaghan Garvey described the song's quiet storm appeal as "envok[ing] her richest and most breathtaking era: the mid-'90s stretch including 1993’s super-sensual janet., and especially 1997’s inimitable and deeply personal classic, The Velvet Rope." The website ranked it 37 on their year-end list of best songs. Lewis Corner and Amy Davidson state that her "undeniably distinct and cooing vocal tone glides perfectly over the effortlessly seductive soundscape[.]" Spin's Brennan Carley considered the song a "slow yet stormy little number." Steven J. Horovitz, writing for Billboard, complimented Jackson's vocals, but noted that "she feels too restrained, doing little to up the midnight-storm beat."

== Chart performance ==
"No Sleeep" sold 38,000 copies through digital download in its first week. It debuted on the US Billboard Hot 100 at number 67, marking Jackson's 40th entry on the chart. The album version of the single featuring J. Cole enabled it to re-enter the Hot 100, giving it a new peak position at number 63. On the US Hot R&B/Hip-Hop Songs, it debuted at number 18, becoming Jackson's 48th entry. It debuted on the US Hot R&B/Hip-Hop Airplay chart at number 27, becoming her 36th hit there, and peaked at number 12. On the US Adult R&B Songs—a component chart of the Hot R&B/Hip-Hop Airplay measuring airplay from Urban adult contemporary radio stations—it entered at number 15, becoming her highest entry on the chart and subsequently rose the number one position. Spending twelve nonconsecutive weeks atop the chart, it became her most successful Adult R&B Song, surpassing "I Get Lonely" (1998), which spent five weeks at number one. As of May 2018, the single has sold 178,183 digital copies according to Nielsen SoundScan.

== Music video ==
A music video made for the album version of the song featuring J. Cole premiered on Today on July 24, 2015. Directed by Dave Meyers, who also directed videos for Jackson's previous singles "All for You", "Just a Little While", and "I Want You", it showcases Jackson residing inside a mansion late at night during a rainstorm. She maneuvers from room to room throughout the dimly lit empty house before being accompanied by J. Cole. Its minimalist aesthetic and production has been compared by Idolator's Bianca Gracie to the music video for "That's The Way Love Goes" (1993). Eliza Berman of Time states that the video "features Jackson holed up in a cozy chalet on a rainy night. Teaming up with the uber-relevant J. Cole—a smart choice for a comeback single—Jackson conjures the laid-back, sexy vibes of early 90s singles like 'That’s the Way Love Goes'." Berman notes that background images of the singer's childhood photos with father Joe Jackson along with certain word choices from J. Cole's verses run contrary to the song's original subject matter, but concludes that "eccentricities aside, it’s a more than welcome return."

== Live performances ==
"No Sleeep" was performed on the 2015–16 Unbreakable World Tour, with J. Cole appearing on the screen. It was also performed on her 2017-2019 State of the World Tour. Jackson included the song on her 2023 Together Again Tour.

== Charts ==
Chart (2015)	Peak position
France (SNEP)	106
UK Singles Downloads (Official Charts)	97
UK Independent (Official Charts)	17
US Billboard Hot 100	63
US Hot R&B/Hip-Hop Songs (Billboard)	18
US Adult R&B Songs (Billboard)	1

=== Year-end charts ===
Chart (2015)	Position
US Adult R&B Songs (Billboard)	7
Chart (2016)	Position
US Adult R&B Songs (Billboard)	16

== Release history ==
Region	Date	Format	Version	Label	Ref.
United States	June 22, 2015	Digital download	Solo	Rhythm Nation	
Brazil	June 22, 2015	Digital download	Solo	LAB 344	
Australia	June 23, 2015	Digital download	Solo	Rhythm Nation	
Italy	June 23, 2015	Contemporary hit radio	Solo	BMG	
United States	June 30, 2015	Urban radio	Solo	Rhythm Nation; BMG	
United States	July 23, 2015	Urban radio	Duet	Rhythm Nation; BMG	
United States	July 23, 2015	Rhythmic crossover radio	Duet	Rhythm Nation; BMG	
United States	July 24, 2015	Digital download	Duet	Rhythm Nation	
Brazil	July 24, 2015	Digital download	Duet	LAB 344	
United Kingdom	July 25, 2015	Digital download	Duet	Rhythm Nation	
Canada	August 7, 2015	Digital download	Duet	Rhythm Nation	
New Zealand	August 7, 2015	Digital download	Duet	Rhythm Nation	
