= Let Me Try (disambiguation) =

"Let Me Try" is a song by Luminiţa Anghel and Sistem.

Let Me Try may also refer to:

- "Let Me Try", a 1965 song by Barry Gordon
- "Let Me Try", a 1970 song by MC5
- "Let Me Try", a 1992 song by Randy Travis
- "Let Me Try", a 1989 song by Ken Laszlo
