= Luv (Janet Jackson song) =

Single by Janet Jackson

from the album Discipline
- Released: February 11, 2008
- Recorded: 2007
- Studio: 2nd Floor Studios (Atlantic City, NJ)
- Length: 3:09
- Label: Island
- Songwriters: Rodney Jerkins; Dernst Emile; Tasleema Yasin; LaShawn Daniels
- Producers: Rodney Jerkins; D'Mile

Janet Jackson singles chronology
"Rock with U" (2008)	"Luv" (2008)	"Can't B Good" (2008)

"Luv" is a song recorded by American singer-songwriter Janet Jackson for her tenth studio album Discipline (2008). Written by Rodney "Darkchild" Jerkins, Dernst "D'Mile" Emile, Tasleema Yasin, and LaShawn Daniels, the song's production was handled by Darkchild and D'Mile. Described as a "feel-good" clap-and-bounce track, "Luv" is an electro-R&B song, with Jackson relating a car crash to falling in love.

"Luv" was released to urban contemporary radio on February 11, 2008, by Island Records as the third single from Discipline. The song received generally positive reviews from music critics, who agreed that it resembles her early hits and highlighted it as one of the album's best tracks. "Luv" had limited chart success, managing to reach number 34 on the US Hot R&B/Hip-Hop Songs.

== Music and lyrics ==
"Luv" was written and produced by Rodney "Darkchild" Jerkins and Dernst "D'Mile" Emile II, with Tasleema Yasin and LaShawn Daniels serving as the co-writers of the track, while Jackson and Ian Cross served as the vocal producers. "Luv" was described as "a brisk, feel-good clap-and-bounce" song, by Andy Kellman of AllMusic, with Princess P. of MWZA describing the lyrics as "an extended automotive metaphor" (red lights/headlights imagery, and the line: "He hit me with his love"), with the chorus constantly repeating "Luv, luv, luv, luv".

"Luv" is an R&B-hip-hop-flavored song, where Jackson relates a car crash to falling in love, singing: "He ran a red light/ And hit me with his luv, luv, luv". Princess P. saw that "vocally, it's hyper like the chorus of Chris Brown's 'With You,' but musically, it sounds like a Southern-fried sequel to Kanye West's 'Good Life'." Glenn Gamboa of Newsday wrote the song "grooves along like it could have come from Ciara's album, aside from a few trade Jackson harmonies."

== Critical reception ==
Andy Kellman of AllMusic picked out the song as one of "the highlights of the album", writing that it is "as innocent, universal, and inviting as anything else in Janet's past." Dan Gennoe of Yahoo! Music agreed, calling it a "Nelly-ish synth sunshine", praising it for being "as clean, crisp and adorable as anything on her 'Design Of A Decade' hits collection." In the same vein, Michael Arceneaux of PopMatters called it "groovy and catchy follow-up to 'Feedback' that reminds listeners of the early stages of the pop star’s career when she sang about her affections innocently."

Joan Anderman of The Boston Globe called it "another standout, a plump, crackling confection." Chad Grischow of IGN commented about her "touched-up vocals" on the track, writing that "actually work in her favor on infectious synth-driven 'Luv', where the computerized blurping vocals in the bouncy hook balance perfectly against her natural voice in the verses." Ann Powers of Los Angeles Times wrote a mixed review, writing that the song "grabs the essence of previous hits by Britney Spears, T-Pain and Kanye West, without so much as a patent application. The overheated production makes it stand out, but it's heartless."

== Commercial performance ==
Much like its predecessor "Rock with U", "Luv" was a commercial failure. Failing to enter the US Billboard Hot 100, it peaked at number two on its extension chart Bubbling Under Hot 100 Singles. The song peaked at number 34 on the Hot R&B/Hip-Hop Songs chart in mid-March 2008, becoming Jackson's 43rd top-40 single on the chart.

== Live performances ==
Jackson first performed "Luv" on America United: In Support of Our Troops, which aired on September 7, 2008, on ABC, in a medley with "Rhythm Nation" (1989). During Jackson's Rock Witchu Tour the same year, "Luv" was performed during the encore, along with "Runaway" (1995). An interlude of the song was used during her Unbreakable World Tour (2015–2016).

== Charts ==
Weekly chart performance for "Luv"
Chart (2008)	Peak position
US Bubbling Under Hot 100 (Billboard)	2
US Hot R&B/Hip-Hop Songs (Billboard)	34

== Release history ==
Release dates and formats for "Luv"
Region	Date	Format(s)	Label(s)	Ref.
United States	February 11, 2008	Urban contemporary radio	Island	
United Kingdom	April 21, 2008	Digital download	Island	
