= Tonight =

Tonight may refer to:

== Television ==
- Tonight (1957 TV programme), a 1957–1965 British current events television programme hosted by Cliff Michelmore, broadcast on BBC
- Tonight (1975 TV programme), a 1975–1979 British current events television programme on BBC One
- Tonight (1999 TV programme), a British news magazine television programme that has aired on ITV since 1999
- 1News Tonight, a New Zealand evening news programme hosted by Kate Hawkesby
- The Tonight Show, a US talk show, also known in its early years as simply Tonight
- Tonight with Arnold Clavio, a Philippine television talk show
- "Tonight" (Prison Break), an episode of Prison Break

== Music ==
=== Bands ===
- Tonight (band), a British new-wave group

=== Albums ===
- Tonight (Big Bang EP), or the title song, 2011
- Tonight (Clark Terry-Bob Brookmeyer Quintet album), 1965
- Tonight (David Bowie album), or the title song (see below), 1984
- Tonight (FM album), 1987
- Tonight (France Joli album), or the title song, 1980
- Tonight (Millionaires album), 2007
- Tonight (Renée Geyer album), 2005
- Tonight (Silk album), or the title song, 1999
- Tonight (TobyMac album), or the title song, 2007
- Tonight! (album), by Four Tops, 1981
- Tonight! (Summercamp EP), 1997
- Tonight: Franz Ferdinand, by Franz Ferdinand, 2009

=== Songs ===
- "Tonight" (Barbara Mandrell song), 1978
- "Tonight" (Big Bang song), 2011
- "Tonight" (The Big Pink song), 2010
- "Tonight" (Blondie song), 2017
- "Tonight" (Danny Byrd song), 2011
- "Tonight" (Def Leppard song), 1993
- "Tonight" (Doja Cat song), 2021
- "Tonight" (Emcee N.I.C.E.), 2014
- "Tonight" (Iggy Pop song), 1977, also covered by co-writer David Bowie, 1984
- "Tonight" (Jay Sean song), 2008
- "Tonight" (Jett Rebel song)
- "Tonight" (Jeremy Camp song), 2006
- "Tonight" (Jessica Sanchez song), 2013
- "Tonight" (Jonas Brothers song)
- "Tonight" (Kállay Saunders song), 2012
- "Tonight" (Ken Laszlo song), 1985
- "Tonight" (Kesha song), 2020
- "Tonight" (Kim Hyun-joong song), 2013
- "Tonight" (Luna Sea song), 2000
- "Tonight" (The Move song), 1971
- "Tonight" (New Kids on the Block song), 1990
- "Tonight" (Phoenix song), 2022
- "Tonight" (PinkPantheress song), 2025
- "Tonight" (Raspberries song), 1973
- "Tonight" (Reamonn song), 2006
- "Tonight" (Rubettes song), 1974
- "Tonight" (Rufus song), 2013
- "Tonight" (Sara Evans song), 2004
- "Tonight" (Seether song), 2011
- "Tonight" (Spica song), 2013
- "Tonight" (Sugarland song), 2011
- "Tonight" (TrueBliss song), 1999
- "Tonight" (The Underdog Project song), 2000
- "Tonight" (Westlife song), 2002
- "Tonight" (West Side Story song), 1956
- "Tonight (Best You Ever Had)", by John Legend featuring Ludacris, 2012
- "Tonight (I'm Lovin' You)", or "Tonight (I'm Fuckin' You)", by Enrique Iglesias, 2010
- "Tonight (We Live Forever)", by Union J, 2014
- "Tonight", by The Afters from Never Going Back to OK, 2008
- "Tonight", by Alex Band from We've All Been There, 2010
- "Tonight", by Benny Mardones from A Journey Through Time, 2002
- "Tonight", by Blackfoot from After the Reign, 1994
- "Tonight", by Drag-On from Oz: The Soundtrack, 2001
- "Tonight", by Dommin from Love is Gone, 2010
- "Tonight", by Elton John from Blue Moves, 1976
- "Tonight", by FM Static from Critically Ashamed, 2006
- "Tonight", by Freezepop from Fancy Ultra•Fresh, 2004
- "Tonight", by the Godfathers from Alpha Beta Gamma Delta, 2022
- "Tonight", by Hard-Fi from Once Upon a Time in the West, 2007
- "Tonight", by Humanoid from Global, 1989
- "Tonight", by Inna from Party Never Ends, 2013
- "Tonight", by James as a B-side of the single "Sit Down", 1989
- "Tonight", by Joe Cocker from Across from Midnight, 1997
- "Tonight", by Keke Palmer and Cham from the film Night at the Museum, 2006
- "Tonight", by Kings of Leon from Mechanical Bull, 2013
- "Tonight", by Kool & The Gang from In the Heart, 1983
- "Tonight", by Kutless from Kutless, 2002
- "Tonight", by Low, 2004
- "Tonight", by Matt Brouwer from Till the Sunrise, 2012
- "Tonight", by MC5 from Back in the USA, 1970
- "Tonight", by McAlmont & Butler from The Sound of McAlmont and Butler, 1995
- "Tonight", by Michael Mazochi from the TV series The Shield, 2002
- "Tonight", by Monni, 2021
- "Tonight", by Mötley Crüe from Too Fast for Love, 1981
- "Tonight", by Nick Lowe from Jesus of Cool, 1978
- "Tonight", by Ozzy Osbourne from Diary of a Madman, 1981
- "Tonight", by Paddy Casey from Addicted to Company (Part One), 2007
- "Tonight", by PinkPantheress from Fancy That, 2025
- "Tonight", by Rapture Ruckus from Rapture Ruckus, 2010
- "Tonight", by Raspberries from Side 3, 1973
- "Tonight", by Ringo Starr from Bad Boy, 1978
- "Tonight", by Scooter from Age of Love, 1997
- "Tonight", by the Soft Boys from Underwater Moonlight, 1980
- "Tonight", by Soulsavers from The Light the Dead See, 2012
- "Tonight", by Staind from 14 Shades of Grey, 2003
- "Tonight", by Supergrass from In It for the Money, 1997
- "Tonight", by Thomas Newson & Magnificence, 2016
- "Tonight", by Tommy Tutone from Tommy Tutone 2, 1981
- "Tonight", by TV on the Radio from Return to Cookie Mountain, 2006
- "Tonight", by Tyler Joseph from No Phun Intended, 2008
- "Tonight", by Xscape from Hummin' Comin' at 'Cha, 1993
- "Tonight", by Yemi Alade from Mama Africa, 2016
- "Tonight", by Yuksek from Away from the Sea, 2009
- "Tonight", by Zayn from Icarus Falls, 2018
- "Tonight (Could Be The Night)", by The Velvets, 1961
- "Tonight (We Need a Lover)", by Mötley Crüe from Theatre of Pain, 1985

== Other uses ==
- Tonight (newspaper), a free afternoon newspaper in Toronto, Canada

== See also ==
- Tonight Tonight (disambiguation)
- "Tonight, Tonight, Tonight", by Genesis
- Tonightly, a British comedy entertainment show
- Tonite (disambiguation)
