= List of Billboard number-one R&B/hip-hop albums of 2008 =

This page lists the albums that reached number one on the Top R&B/Hip-Hop Albums and Top Rap Albums charts in 2008. The Rap Albums chart partially serves as a distillation of rap-specific titles from the overall R&B/Hip-Hop Albums chart.

== Chart history ==
Key
†	Indicates best-performing album of 2008

Issue date	R&B/Hip-Hop Albums	Artist(s)	Rap Albums	Artist(s)	Refs.
January 5	Growing Pains	Mary J. Blige	Lupe Fiasco's The Cool	Lupe Fiasco	
January 12	Growing Pains	Mary J. Blige	Lupe Fiasco's The Cool	Lupe Fiasco	
January 19	Growing Pains	Mary J. Blige	Lupe Fiasco's The Cool	Lupe Fiasco	
January 26	Growing Pains	Mary J. Blige	American Gangster	Jay-Z	
February 2	Love Behind the Melody	Raheem deVaughn	Lupe Fiasco's The Cool	Lupe Fiasco	
February 9	Growing Pains	Mary J. Blige	Lupe Fiasco's The Cool	Lupe Fiasco	
February 16	Growing Pains	Mary J. Blige	Lupe Fiasco's The Cool	Lupe Fiasco	
February 23	As I Am †	Alicia Keys	American Gangster	Jay-Z	
March 1	As I Am †	Alicia Keys	Lupe Fiasco's The Cool	Lupe Fiasco	
March 8	Growing Pains	Mary J. Blige	Harlem's American Gangster	Jim Jones	
March 15	Discipline	Janet Jackson	Savage Life 2	Webbie	
March 22	Discipline	Janet Jackson	Savage Life 2	Webbie	
March 29	Trilla	Rick Ross	Trilla	Rick Ross	
April 5	Welcome to the Dollhouse	Danity Kane	Trilla	Rick Ross	
April 12	Day26	Day26	Trilla	Rick Ross	
April 19	Still da Baddest	Trina	Still da Baddest	Trina	
April 26	All I Feel	Ray J	Trilla	Rick Ross	
May 3	E=MC²	Mariah Carey	Trilla	Rick Ross	
May 10	E=MC²	Mariah Carey	Trilla	Rick Ross	
May 17	Lyfe Change	Lyfe Jennings	Rising Down	The Roots	
May 24	E=MC²	Mariah Carey	Trilla	Rick Ross	
May 31	Just Me	Keith Sweat	Trilla	Rick Ross	
June 7	II Trill	Bun B	II Trill	Bun B	
June 14	Here I Stand	Usher	II Trill	Bun B	
June 21	Here I Stand	Usher	II Trill	Bun B	
June 28	Tha Carter III	Lil Wayne	Tha Carter III †	Lil Wayne	
July 5	Tha Carter III	Lil Wayne	Tha Carter III †	Lil Wayne	
July 12	Tha Carter III	Lil Wayne	Tha Carter III †	Lil Wayne	
July 19	Tha Carter III	Lil Wayne	Tha Carter III †	Lil Wayne	
July 26	Tha Carter III	Lil Wayne	Tha Carter III †	Lil Wayne	
August 2	Untitled	Nas	Untitled	Nas	
August 9	Untitled	Nas	Untitled	Nas	
August 16	Tha Carter III	Lil Wayne	Tha Carter III †	Lil Wayne	
August 23	Lessons in Love	Lloyd	Tha Carter III †	Lil Wayne	
August 30	Tha Carter III	Lil Wayne	Tha Carter III †	Lil Wayne	
September 6	Raw Footage	Ice Cube	Raw Footage	Ice Cube	
September 13	L.A.X.	The Game	L.A.X.	The Game	
September 20	The Recession	Young Jeezy	The Recession	Young Jeezy	
September 27	The Recession	Young Jeezy	The Recession	Young Jeezy	
October 4	Year of the Gentleman	Ne-Yo	Brass Knuckles	Nelly	
October 11	Fearless	Jazmine Sullivan	The Recession	Young Jeezy	
October 18	Paper Trail	T.I.	Paper Trail	T.I.	
October 25	Paper Trail	T.I.	Paper Trail	T.I.	
November 1	Paper Trail	T.I.	Paper Trail	T.I.	
November 8	Paper Trail	T.I.	Paper Trail	T.I.	
November 15	Evolver	John Legend	Paper Trail	T.I.	
November 22	Paper Trail	T.I.	Paper Trail	T.I.	
November 29	Three Ringz	T-Pain	Paper Trail	T.I.	
December 6	I Am... Sasha Fierce	Beyoncé	Paper Trail	T.I.	
December 13	808s & Heartbreak	Kanye West	Theater of the Mind	Ludacris	
December 20	I Am... Sasha Fierce	Beyoncé	Emeritus	Scarface	
December 27	Onmyradio	Musiq Soulchild	Universal Mind Control	Common	

== See also ==
- 2008 in music
- 2008 in hip hop music
- List of number-one R&B singles of 2008 (U.S.)
- List of Billboard 200 number-one albums of 2008
