= Tonight Tonight =

Tonight Tonight may refer to:

- "Tonight Tonight" (Bill Champlin song), 1981
- "Tonight Tonight" (Hot Chelle Rae song), 2011
- "Tonight, Tonight" (The Smashing Pumpkins song), 1996
- "Tonight Tonight", a song by Celeste from the album Not Your Muse
- "Tonight Tonight", a song by John King
- "Tonight, Tonight", a song by The Mello-Kings, 1957
- "Tonight Tonight", a song by The Rasmus from the album Hell of a Tester
- "Tonight Tonight", a song by Rascal Flatts from the album Nothing Like This

== See also ==
- "Tonight, Tonight, Tonight", a song by Genesis
- Tonight (disambiguation)
- Tonite (disambiguation)
