= D. DoRohn Gough =

American music producer

- Born: March 22, 1978 (age 46); Detroit, Michigan, U.S.
- Occupation: Record producer
- Years active: 2008–present

David DoRohn Gough Sr. (born March 22, 1978) is an American record producer from Detroit, Michigan. He has served as the president and chief executive officer (CEO) of DoRohn Entertainment since 2017, which was founded by his father in 1978. He is best known for his work with R&B singer Ne-Yo, having produced his 2010 single "Champagne Life," as well as Janet Jackson's 2008 single "Can't B Good"—which Ne-Yo co-produced.

== Early life ==
Gough was born on March 22, 1978, into a musical family. He was raised in Detroit, Michigan as the son of the son of David L. Gough, founder of the "International Gospel Music Hall of Fame and Museum".

== Career ==
Gough received classical and jazz training at the Center for Creative Studies and Performing Arts and studied music at Eastern Michigan University. During this time, he met Kern & Valdez Brantley, (musical directors for Lady Gaga and Usher), both of whom became his musical mentors.

After college, Gough remained committed to his gospel roots and began working with gospel singer Dorinda Clark-Cole. He was soon recruited to play the keyboards for the 2006 "Up-close and Personal Tour" featuring Chris Brown and Ne-Yo. The latter of whom discovered Gough's songwriting ability and signed him as a producer to his record label, Compound Entertainment. By doing so, Gough received his first commercial songwriting credits on the 2008 songs "Then There’s You" for Day 26 and "Can't B Good" for Janet Jackson on her Discipline album. Gough then produced multiple songs from Ne-Yo's 2010 album Libra Scale—including "What Have I Done?" and its second single, "Champagne Life". In the following years, Gough has contributed to a number of Ne-Yo's productions in both his recording and songwriting careers.

== Discography ==
- 2008: "Can't Be Good" (Janet Jackson - Discipline)
- 2009: "Then There's You" (Day 26 - Forever in a Day)
- 2010: "Champagne Life" (Ne-Yo - Libra Scale)
- 2010: "What Have I Done?" (Ne-Yo - Libra Scale)
- 2012: "Champagne Life" (Gerald Albright & Norman Brown — 24/7)
- 2014: "Don't Say Good Bye" (Kem featuring L. Renee — Promise To Love Deluxe Edition)
- 2020: "His Love" (The Clark Sisters featuring Snoop Dogg — The Return: Deluxe Edition)
- 2021: "Trouble Don't Last Always" (D'Shondra featuring Kirk Franklin — D'SHONDRA EP)
