= Tobita =

Tobita can refer to:

== People ==
- Masaru Tobita (or "Survival Tobita"), Japanese professional wrestler
- Nobuo Tobita, Japanese voice actor
- Ruki Tobita, Japanese snowboarder

== Places ==
- Tobita Shinchi (red light district) in Osaka, Japan

== See also ==
- Tonita (name)
