= Rock with U =

2008 single by Janet Jackson

Single by Janet Jackson

from the album Discipline
- Released: February 5, 2008
- Recorded: 2007
- Studio: SouthSide Studios (Atlanta, GA); Legacy Recording Studios (New York, NY)
- Genre: Pop; Eurodisco; house
- Length: 3:53
- Label: Island
- Songwriters: Shaffer Smith; Jermaine Dupri; Eric Stamile
- Producers: Jermaine Dupri; Eric Stamile

Janet Jackson singles chronology
"Feedback" (2007)	"Rock with U" (2008)	"Luv" (2008)

Music video
- "Rock with U" on YouTube

"Rock with U" is a song by American singer Janet Jackson from her tenth studio album, Discipline (2008). It was written by Ne-Yo, Jermaine Dupri, and Eric Stamile, and produced by the last two. The song was released as the album's second single on February 5, 2008, by Island Records. "Rock with U" is a pop, Eurodisco, and house song that was recorded with the gay community in mind, as Jackson felt the necessity to do something for her gay fans, as well as the wider community members.

"Rock with U" received positive reviews from music critics, with the majority lauding its retro, but futuristic sound, and commending the song's elements of house music. The song had minimal success, only being able to reach the Bubbling Under Hot 100 Singles and the top 20 of the Hot Dance Club Songs. Saam Farahmand directed the long-take music video, which features Jackson having a party inside a club, with red and white rays of light entering the room. "Rock with U" served as the title for Jackson's Rock Witchu Tour the same year, where the song was also performed.

== Background and writing ==
In July 2007, it was announced that Jackson had signed a recording contract with Island Records, after her five-album deal with Virgin Records was fulfilled with the release of her album 20 Y.O. (2006). Jackson's tenth studio album, Discipline, which was an acknowledgment of Jackson's commitment, focus and dedication to her career, was released on February 26, 2008 under the supervision of label head L. A. Reid. She did not write or co-write any songs on the album, a departure from her usual practice of co-writing and producing all of the songs on her albums. "Rock with U" was written by Shaffer Smith, Jermaine Dupri and Eric Stamile, with Dupri producing it, while Stamile co-produced it. In an interview for NewNowNext, Jackson explained that the song was created for the gay community, saying,

"Honestly the song was created for the gay community. I kept stressing to Jermaine [Dupri, the song's co-writer], 'I got to do something for the kids.' I had talked about it on the last album – and there was a song that I had, and it wasn't quite completed. And I talked about it to the papers, gay magazines, and it didn't wind up on the album with the cut-off date. I felt really badly about that. So he just handed me a CD and said, ‘Here are 10 tracks for the kids; tell me which one you like the best.' I fell in love with 'Rock With U'."

After the song was released, Jackson was awarded the Vanguard Award at the 19th annual GLAAD Media Awards, honoring her contributions in promoting equal rights among the gay community. The organization's president commented, "Ms. Jackson has a tremendous following inside the LGBT community and out, and having her stand with us against the defamation that LGBT people still face in our country is extremely significant."

== Music and lyrics ==
"Rock with U"
23-second sample of "Rock with U", with Jackson's robotic vocals.

"Rock with U" is a pop, Eurodisco, and house song. According to Jackson, it is reminiscent of "Together Again" or "Throb" from The Velvet Rope (1997) and janet. (1993), respectively. "It's still classic me but with a different twist to it – a modern twist", she said. Jim Farber from the New York Daily News noted the song's riffs, which he considered greater when they first appeared in Madonna's 1985 song "Into the Groove". The song was compared to Jackson's brother Michael Jackson's "Rock with You" (1979), due to the similar title and its disco themes. "Rock with U" also contains vocodered whispers and murmured vocals. The song opens with the line, "Strobe lights make everything sexier", while it talks about an erotic proposition which was reportedly dedicated to the gay community.

== Release ==
"Rock with U" was made available for sale through the US iTunes Store on February 5, 2008, along with a pre-order offer for Discipline. In the United States, the song was serviced to rhythmic contemporary radio stations on February 11 and to contemporary hit radio stations on February 26.

== Critical reception ==
"Rock with U" was met with general critical acclaim from most music critics, with most praising its style and retro vibe. Picking the song as one of the album's best tracks, Andy Kellman of AllMusic named it "an irresistible, grade-A dancefloor track", calling it "swift and swooning." Bryan Borzykowski of Now called it a "bouncy house track", while Nick Levine from Digital Spy called it "cosmic, sleek, catchy and bracingly modern", writing that "it wouldn't disgrace itself as a Kylie [Minogue] single." Dan Gennoe of Yahoo! Music was extremely positive, writing that the song marries Jackson's sweet and stomping side for a 1980s influenced song, which we called both genuinely exciting and "sounds 100 per cent like Janet Jackson".

Ann Powers from the Los Angeles Times enjoyed the track, calling it "the gentlest time travel ever accomplished." Powers also wrote, "Playing on memory and melancholia, Janet's 'Rock With U' is nowhere as great as the original, but as a bit of intimate meta-pop it's utterly poignant. Jackson has long been the bearer of her brother's secrets, and on this song she shows that she can still crave something other than sexual fulfillment. Something like innocence." Michael Arceneaux of PopMatters praised the track, calling it "a sensual gem" and "almost euphoric", effectively complimenting Jackson's "whispery delivery." Arceneaux added, "It's a digitized form of pop music Janet should look into for future recordings." Tom Young from BBC Music was negative in his review, saying that its lyrics would not seduce anybody.

== Music video ==
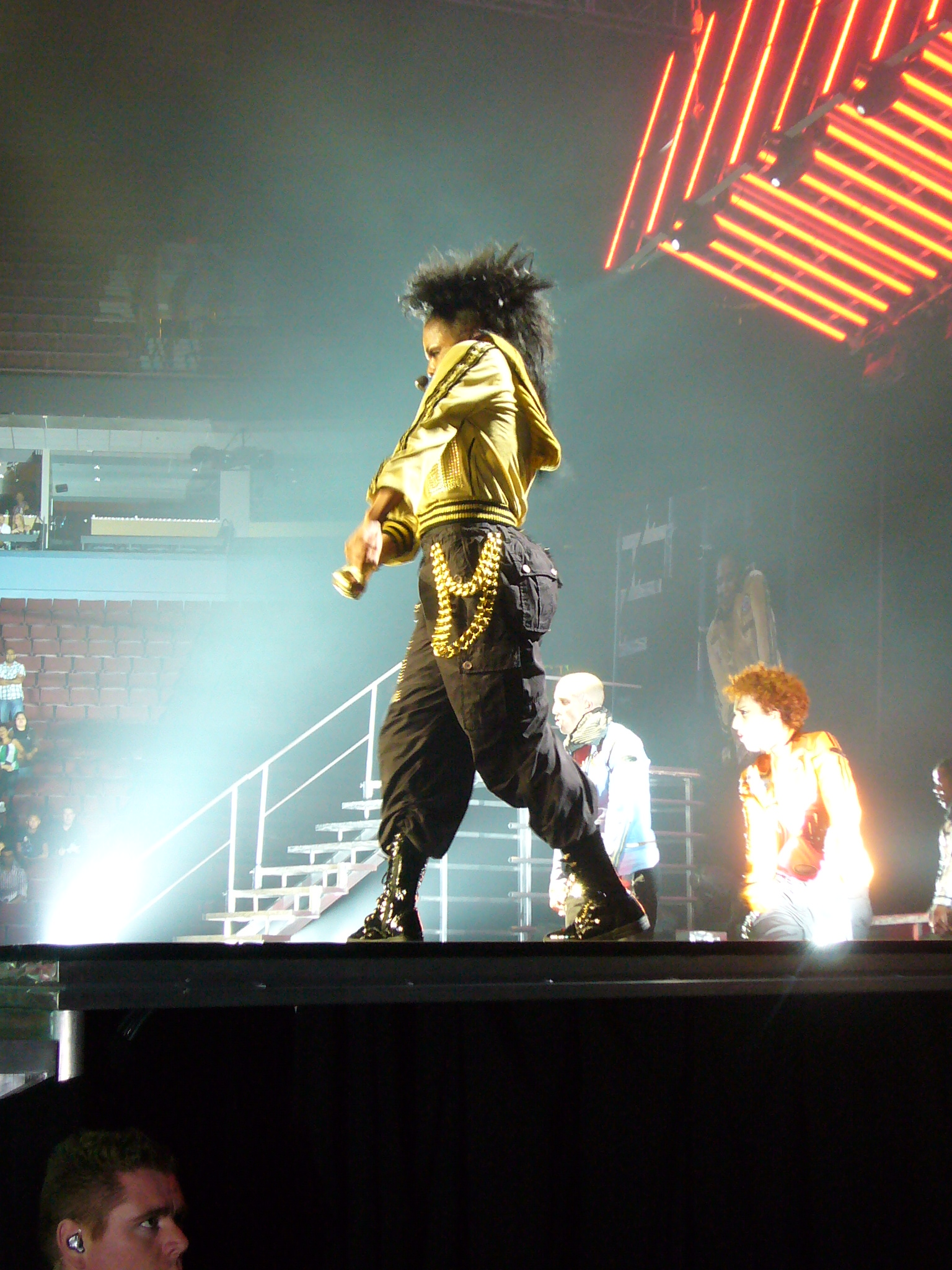
Jackson performing the song during the 2008 Rock Witchu Tour

The accompanying music video for "Rock with U" was directed by Saam Farahmand and choreographed by Gil Duldulao. It premiered on Access Granted on March 5, 2008. Jackson described Farahmand as an excited, passionated and creative person. He wanted to make the video as a long take video, like the music video for previous single "Feedback", which he also directed. According to the singer, the makeup looks and fashion of the video were a "futuristic version of the Blitz Kids from the 80's". Dulduao commented "I just wanted sort of bring Janet into the visionary style she's had in the past and I wanted to bring to like, video, and bring it back". He also mentioned that it took him at least a day and a half to finish its choreography.

The long-take video begins with many people dancing on a hallway, until a girl comes and opens a door which leads to a room. There, other dancers are dancing to the song in midway of white rays of light, until the camera shows Jackson in the corner of the room and they start performing a dance routine. While the singer disappears from vision, people dance until she appears again dancing to the song. Then she goes to a hallway and enters a red-lighted room, accompanied by dancers, where entertainer Mimi Marks is seen. There she dances another routine along with her dancers. After dancing, she enters in another hallway where she gets alone with a man, until they share a kiss. Then, people who were in the previous room enter to the hallway to connect to another room, with Marks taking Jackson with her. The video ends with people coming closer to Jackson.

== Live performances ==
Jackson performed "Rock with U" on Good Morning America, which aired in February 2008 on ABC. During the Rock Witchu Tour the same year, "Rock with U" was performed by Jackson right after "All Nite (Don't Stop)". An interlude of "Rock with U" was used during her Unbreakable World Tour (2015–2016). It was also included during the DJ intermission on the State of the World Tour (2017–2018). Jackson also included the song on the set list of her Las Vegas residency Janet Jackson: Metamorphosis (2019), as well as her Glastonbury Festival performance the same year. During the May 28, 2023 concert of her tour, Janet Jackson: Together Again in Milwaukee, "Rock with U" was performed after being requested by one of her backup dancers., before being added permanently for the 2024 shows. The song was performed for her 2024–2025 Janet Jackson: Las Vegas residency.

== Credits and personnel ==
Credits adapted from the liner notes of Discipline.

- Janet Jackson – vocals
- Shaffer Smith – songwriter
- Jermaine Dupri – songwriter, producer, vocal production, mixing
- Eric Stamile – songwriter, co-producer
- Manuel Seal – vocal production
- Ian Cross – vocal production, mixing assistant, vocal recording
- John Horesco IV – guitar, recording
- Josh Houghkirk – engineer
- Steven Barlow – assistant engineer
- Chris Soper – assistant engineer
- Angie Teo – assistant engineer

== Charts ==
Chart performance for "Rock with U"
Chart (2008)	Peak position
Japan (Japan Hot 100)	27
US Bubbling Under Hot 100 (Billboard)	21
US Bubbling Under R&B/Hip-Hop Songs (Billboard)	14
US Dance Club Songs (Billboard)	20

== Release history ==
Release dates and formats for "Rock with U"
Region	Date	Format(s)	Label(s)	Ref.
United States	February 5, 2008	Digital download	Island	
United States	February 12, 2008	Rhythmic contemporary radio	Island	
United States	February 26, 2008	Contemporary hit radio	Island	
