= Ken Laszlo (album) =

1987 studio album by Ken Laszlo

Studio album by Ken Laszlo
- Released: 3 July 1987
- Studio: Arlequin (Mantua)
- Genre: Italo disco
- Length: 38:01
- Label: Memory
- Producer: Stefano Cundari; Claudio Cattafesta; Alessandro Zanni

Ken Laszlo chronology
Ken Laszlo (1987)	Dr Ken & Mr Laszlo (1998)

Singles from Ken Laszlo
- 1. "Hey Hey Guy" Released: 1984; 2. "Tonight" Released: 1985; 3. "Don't Cry" Released: 1986; 4. "1-2-3-4-5-6-7-8" Released: 1987; 5. "Glasses Man" Released: 1987

Ken Laszlo is the debut studio album by Italian singer Ken Laszlo, released on 3 July 1987, by Memory Records.

Five singles were released from the album: "Hey Hey Guy", "Tonight", "Don't Cry", "1-2-3-4-5-6-7-8" and "Glasses Man".

== Commercial performance ==
In Sweden, the album debuted in its peak of number 31 and spent only one week on the chart.

== Track listing ==
Ken Laszlo – Side one
No.	Title	Writer(s)	Length
1.	"Tonight (Remix)"	Sandro Oliva; Gino Caria	6:50
2.	"Let Me Try"	Oliva; Caria	4:23
3.	"Black Pearl"	Oliva; Caria	4:00
4.	"Glasses Man"	Oliva; Caria	4:07
Total length:			19:20

Ken Laszlo – Side two
No.	Title	Writer(s)	Length
1.	"1-2-3-4-5-6-7-8"	Oliva; Caria	4:30
2.	"Talkin"	Oliva; Caria	4:20
3.	"Don't Cry (Remix)"	Oliva; Caria	4:09
4.	"Hey Hey Guy (USA Remix)"	Oliva	5:42
Total length:			18:41

Notes

- "1-2-3-4-5-6-7-8" was re-titled "1.2.3.4.5.6.7.8" on certain editions of the album.

== Personnel ==
Credits adapted from the album's liner notes.

Musicians

- Ken Laszlo – lead vocals

Production and design

- Stefano Cundari – producer, mixing
- Claudio Cattafesta – producer, mixing
- Alessandro Zanni – producer
- Emilio Tremolada – photography

== Charts ==
Weekly chart performance for Ken Laszlo
Chart (1987)	Peak position
Finnish Albums (Suomen virallinen lista)	18
Swedish Albums (Sverigetopplistan)	31
