= Tonite =

Tonite may refer to:

- A rare variant of "tonight"; see Tonight (disambiguation)
- Tonite (explosive), type of explosive
- Tonite (Bad Boys Blue album), 2000
- "Tonite" (DJ Quik song), 1991
- "Tonite" (LCD Soundsystem song), 2017
- "Tonite", song by Phats and Small from Now Phats What I Small Music, 1999
- "Tonite", song by Air Supply from The One That You Love, 1981
- "Tonite", song by Eminem from Infinite, 1996
- "Tonite", song by the Go-Go's from Beauty and the Beat, 1981
- "Tonite", song by April Wine from Harder ... Faster, 1979
- "2nite", song by Janet Jackson from Discipline, 2008
- "2nite", song by Yeat from ADL, 2026

== See also ==
- Tonie
- Tonita (name)
- Toñito (name)
