= Can't B Good =

Single by Janet Jackson

from the album Discipline
- Released: March 18, 2008
- Recorded: 2007–2008
- Studio: SouthSide (Atlanta)
- Genre: R&B
- Length: 4:13
- Label: Island
- Songwriters: David DoRohn Gough; Shaffer Smith
- Producers: D. DoRohn Gough; Ne-Yo

Janet Jackson singles chronology
"Luv" (2008)	"Can't B Good" (2008)	"Make Me" (2009)

"Can't B Good" is a song recorded by American singer-songwriter Janet Jackson for her tenth studio album Discipline (2008). It was written and produced by D. DoRohn Gough and Ne-Yo. The song is a soulful, "jazzy" R&B track about Jackson's relationship with Jermaine Dupri. It was released as the fourth and final single from Discipline on March 18, 2008 by Island Records.

"Can't B Good" received mostly positive reviews from music critics, who praised it for being smooth, tender and lovely, and picked the song as one of the best tracks on Discipline, with some others comparing the song to "Human Nature" (1983) by Jackson's brother Michael. Commercially, "Can't B Good" peaked at number 76 on the US Hot R&B/Hip-Hop Songs and number 20 on the US Adult R&B Songs chart.

== Recording and production ==
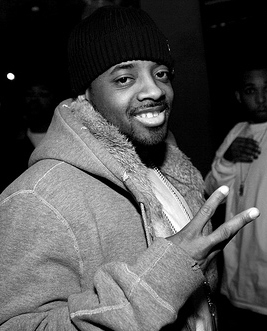
The song was inspired by Jackson's relationship with Jermaine Dupri (pictured).

"Can't B Good" was written and produced by D. DoRohn Gough and Ne-Yo. It was recorded between 2007 and 2008 at SouthSide Studios in Atlanta, Georgia. Although Jackson did not write the song, Jackson described "Can't B Good" as a song reflecting her seven-year relationship with songwriter and producer Jermaine Dupri, saying: "I'd been hurt before, and I was trying to protect myself. I'm glad I allowed myself to accept it. He's very attentive and affectionate, a beautiful soul". A remix of the song was recorded, featuring Jamaican rapper Red Rat, and was produced by HardWork.

== Music and lyrics ==
Princess P. from MWZA described the lyrics as "standard falling-in-love-too-deep far", with the thwack of the snare contrasting heavily with the layers of cooing vocals. Musically, the song is a mid-tempo "smooth and jazzy" R&B ballad, featuring thundering bass and piano, with 1980s-inspired keyboard sounds and cooing harmonies. Princess P. also wrote the song resembles Aaliyah's "Rock the Boat" (2001) with a more "punishing" beat, Jackson's brother Michael's "Butterflies" (2001) and Janet Jackson's own track "Spending Time with You" from Damita Jo (2004).

== Critical reception ==
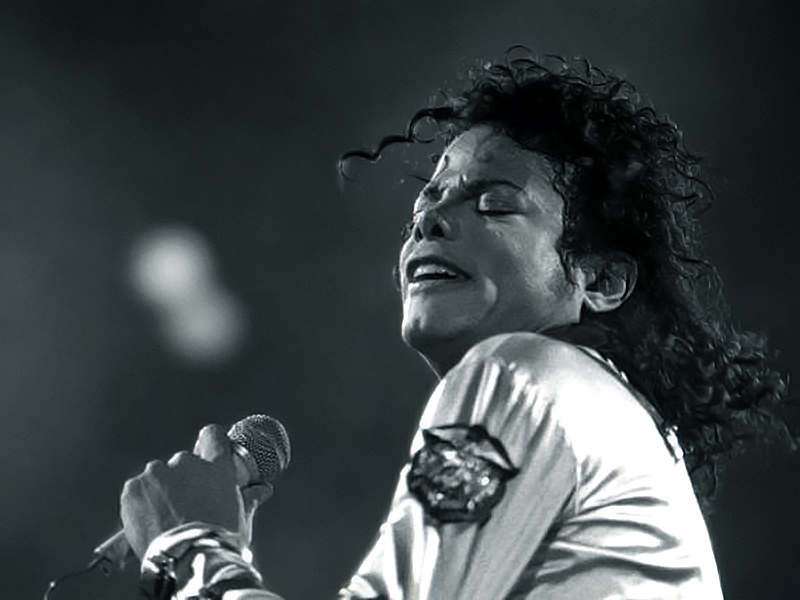
Some critics compared "Can't B Good" to Michael Jackson songs, including "Human Nature" (1983).

"Can't B Good" received mostly positive reviews from music critics. Andy Kellman from AllMusic picked the song as one of the album's best tracks, highlighting that "it's a descendent of her brother Michael's 'Can't Help It,' with that gentle and affecting self-examination that only a Jackson can do so well." Chuck Taylor of Billboard magazine wrote that "'Can't B Good' serves up a smooth, jazzy groove and Jackson's soft, supple vocal, fluffed with multiple background layers that duly merit adult R&B love." Princess P. from MWZA saw that, "The layers pile and pile so that by the bridge, the song is virtually dizzying", calling it "extremely well-produced." The Boston Globe writer Joan Anderman perceived the song is "eerily reminiscent of 'Human Nature', one of brother Michael's most elegant records." Margeaux Watson of Entertainment Weekly agreed, calling a "tender" throwback to the same song.

Los Angeles Times' Ann Powers called it "a waterfall of mixed emotions enfolding a sunlit morning-after," and "the most emotionally vulnerable ballad Jackson's recorded in years." Dan Gennoe of Yahoo! Music wrote that the song "proves that ballads don't have to be inane and that she doesn't have to spell out exactly where she wants it and how to be sexy." Glenn Gamboa from Newsday praised the track, writing that it could be one of her best songs ever. Caroline Sullivan, writing for The Guardian, simply wrote that "Can't B Good" is completely lovely. Andy Battaglia of The A.V. Club called it a "majestic" song produced by Ne-Yo. Tom Young of BBC Music called it "a potential diamond." For Nick Levine from Digital Spy, the song was created to recall classic Jackson ballads like "Come Back to Me" (1990) and "Let's Wait Awhile" (1987), but failed to do so, due to its lack of melody. Chad Grischow of IGN was less favorable, calling it "cheesy late-eighties ballad, featuring wafer-thin breathy vocals that sounds like someone calling you to their hospital bed rather than the bedroom."

== Commercial performance ==
"Can't B Good" was the fifth most-added song on Radio & Records's urban adult contemporary panel, debuting at number 40 on the Radio & Records Urban AC Chart dated March 28, 2008. The song debuted and peaked at number 40 on the Billboard Adult R&B Songs the week ending April 5, 2008. Furthermore, it peaked at number 76 on the Hot R&B/Hip-Hop Songs.

== Credits and personnel ==
Credits adapted from the liner notes of Discipline.

- Janet Jackson – vocals
- David DoRohn Gough – songwriter, producer
- Shaffer Smith – songwriter, producer
- Jermaine Dupri – vocals production
- Manuel Seal – vocals production
- Ian Cross – vocals production, mixing assistant
- Phil Tan – mixing
- John Houghkirk – engineer
- Carlos Oyanedel – assistant

== Charts ==
Weekly chart performance for "Can't B Good"
Chart (2008)	Peak position
US Adult R&B Songs (Billboard)	20
US Hot R&B/Hip-Hop Songs (Billboard)	76
