= Tonita (name) =

Tonita is a feminine given name and a surname. Notable people with this name include the following:

== Given name ==
- Tonita Castro (1953 – 2016), Mexican-born American actress
- Tonita Peña born as Quah Ah and also known as Tonita Vigil Peña and María Antonia Tonita Peña (1893 – 1949), American artist

== Surname ==
- Ovidiu Tonița (born 1980), Romanian rugby union player

== See also ==
- Tobita (disambiguation)
- Tonia (name)
- Tonina (disambiguation)
- Tonite (disambiguation)
- Toñito (name)
