= Rock Witchu Tour =

2008 concert tour by Janet Jackson

- Tour by Janet Jackson
- Tourbook cover
- Location: North America
- Associated album: Discipline
- Start date: September 10, 2008
- End date: November 1, 2008
- Legs: 1
- No. of shows: 16
- Box office: US$11.7 million ($17.5 million in 2025 dollars)

Janet Jackson concert chronology
- All for You Tour (2001–02); Rock Witchu Tour (2008); Number Ones, Up Close and Personal (2011)

Rock Witchu Tour was the fifth concert tour by American singer Janet Jackson, in support of her tenth studio album Discipline (2008), and her first in nearly seven years, following a total blacklist of the singer's music, due to the Super Bowl XXXVIII halftime show controversy. The tour began on September 10, 2008, in Vancouver, Canada, and was scheduled to conclude in Fukuoka, Japan, on February 22, 2009. However, several North American dates were cancelled due to Jackson's vertigo, and the upcoming Japanese leg was scrapped, following the 2009 economic crisis and another bout of illness for the singer. The tour officially ended on November 1, 2008, in New York City, resulting in only sixteen shows. Still, the tour received rave reviews, and at the end of 2008, was placed 78th on Pollstar's "Top 100 North American Tours", grossing $11.7 million.

== Background ==
After releasing her eighth studio album, Damita Jo (2004), Janet dealt with criticism with the massively controversial Super Bowl incident, resulting to a blacklist of Jackson's subsequent singles and music videos from several conglomerates, including Viacom's MTV and CBS and various subsidiaries, which largely affected Jackson's airplay on many radio formats and music channels worldwide. Due to that, Jackson did not go on tour to support Damita Jo, and instead recorded her ninth studio album during 2005–2006. The album, entitled 20 Y.O., was released in September 2006, and it was announced that Janet was prepping a worldwide tour to promote the album. However, the unnamed tours were canceled abruptly when Jackson began recording new material. Jackson stated:

"I was supposed to go on tour with the last album [...] We were actually in full-blown tour rehearsals at that point ... learning numbers, getting everything together, set designs [...] I had to kind of shut everything down and go into the studio."

In early 2008 on The Ellen DeGeneres Show, Jackson announced that she would go on tour. The audience was given free tickets to her show at the Staples Center. While planning the tour, Jackson started a phone line where fans could call in and request songs to be performed. Jackson was set to perform all of her memorable hits, including those from her pre-Control days.

== Development ==
According to Janet herself, "It will definitely be a big production but it will definitely also be something that I've never done before, that people have never seen from me before." The title of the tour, "Rock Witchu Tour", was named for a song of the same name on her latest album, Discipline. The tour was set to be worldwide, with Janet stating, "It's been a while so I really want to make my rounds. I haven't been to Australia in a very long time; I can't wait to go there. There are a lot of places where I really want to stop off at, and that's the idea, that's the goal with this tour."

In April 2008, the singer claimed, "I'm still promoting the new album (Discipline) right now, but we'll be getting into rehearsals in about a month and then start touring," Jackson says. For Janet, "My true goal is to try at least do every single that I’ve ever had. So, I’ve got to figure out a way to fit this in two hours, and yet give them enough of each song so that they don’t feel hungry for more of that song in particular." The two and a half hour show kicked off in Vancouver on September 10, 2008, to rave reviews.

== Synopsis ==
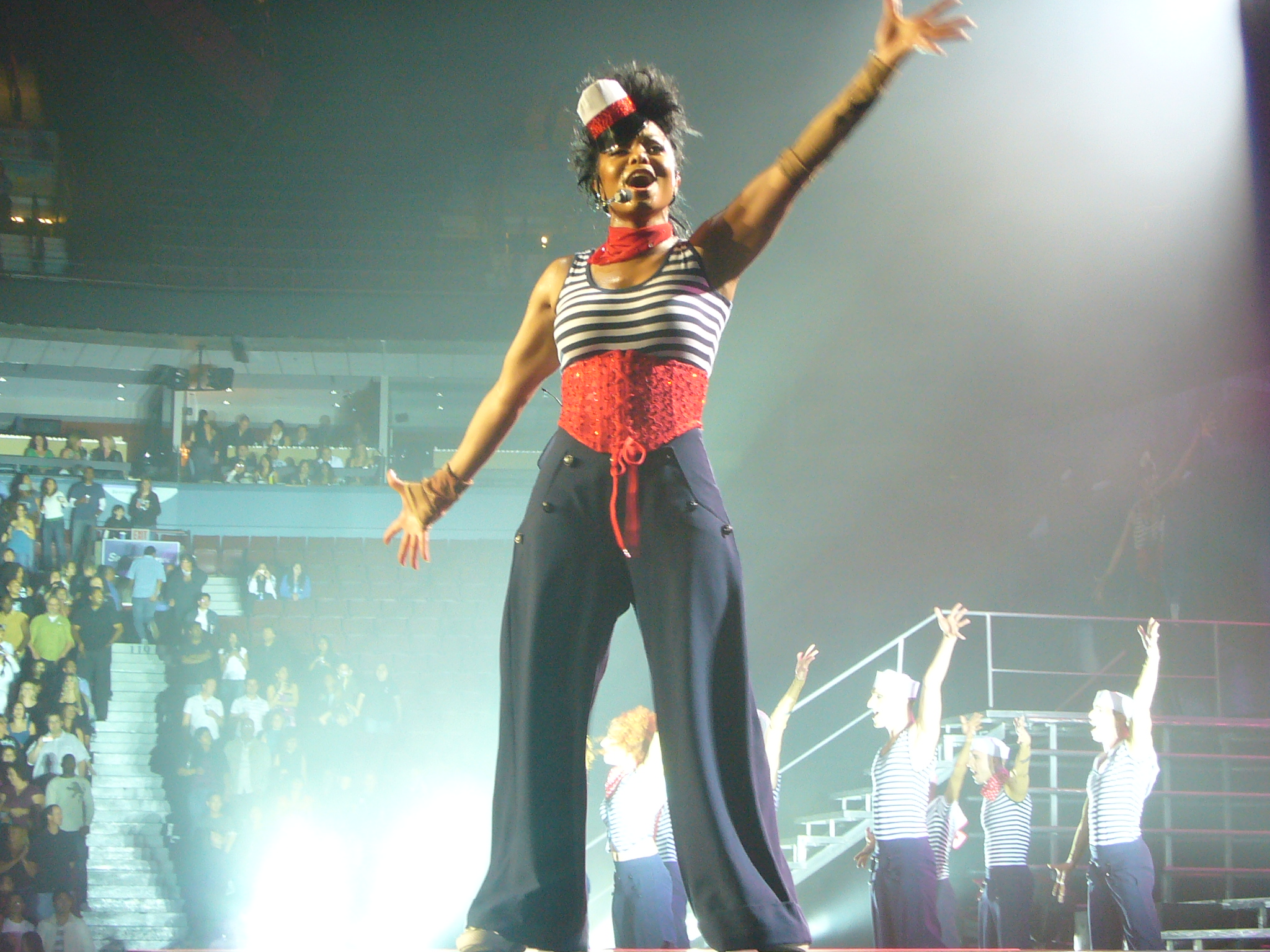
Janet performing "Miss You Much".

For two hours, the show sees Janet performing nearly 40 hits, complete with theatrics, costume changes and a few surprises. According to Janet, the tour features a set list that was directly influenced by her fans. The setup of the stage includes a giant square-shaped catwalk surrounding the first several front rows of seats, reaching out to the center of the arena where fans could see Jackson from any level of seating. Rows of seating inside the catwalk were exclusively designed for those with purchased fan club memberships. There are three video screens that take on the stage, including the biggest one being in the center where video clips are shown throughout songs to take place for effects and in-between costume change breaks. Other special staging includes movable staircases, steel cages, pyrotechnics, and other special pieces.

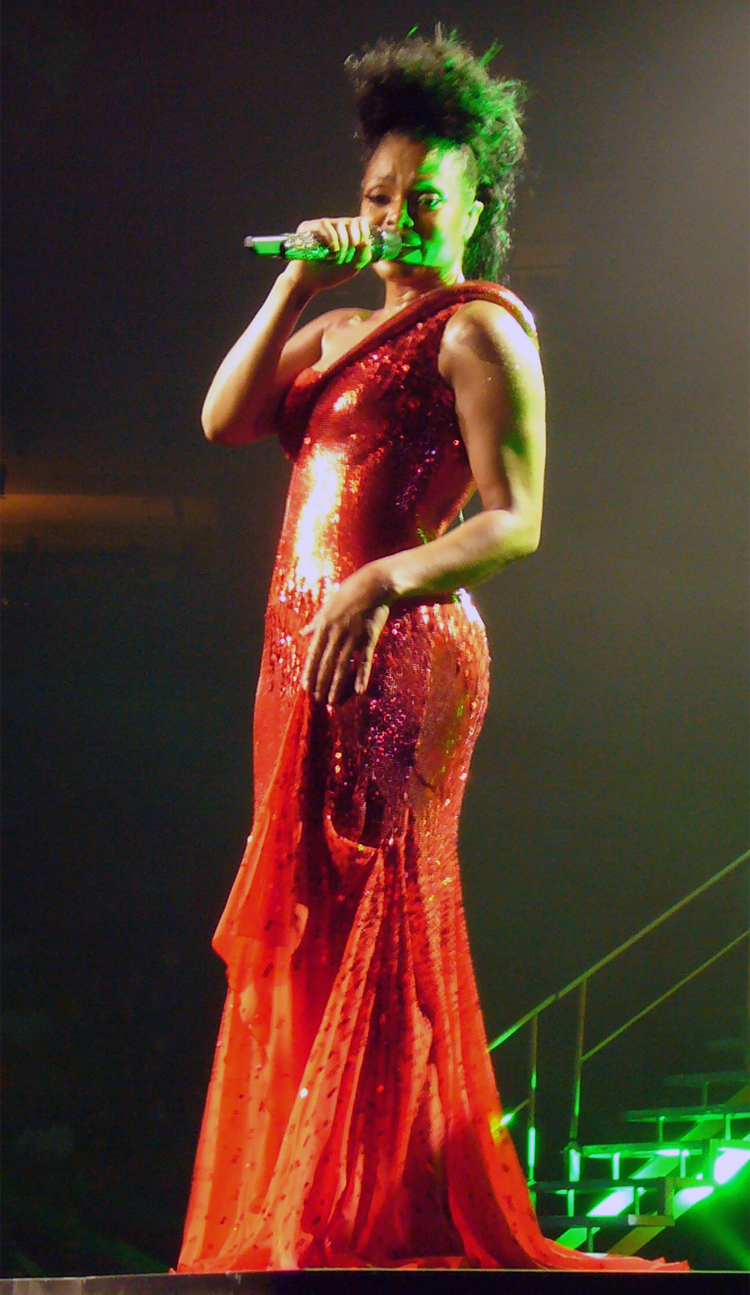
Janet performing "Again".

The show begins with an echo of words being said in the distance of the arena, such as "Janet", "Rock Witchu", "Dance", and "Discipline". As the words speed up, the show lights come on and several dancers dressed as astronauts appear on the stage, with two standing beside two big glittery "J"'s (representing Janet's name.) The "J"'s move back and forth on the center of the stage with stars appearing on the center video screen (a representation of Space). Pretty soon, fog appears in front of the audience and a bang of pyrotechnics blasts, thus beginning the opening of the show. Jackson appears on the upper center section of the stage in a gold hyperspace dance suit singing "The Pleasure Principle", as well as "Control", when 13 dancers join her, emerging from underground in various positions around the massive stage, and "What Have You Done for Me Lately", on the "Control Medley", and later moving on to "Feedback". She then performed "You Want This", "Alright" and "Miss You Much." Afterward Janet did a brief costume change and returned to the stage in a sultry red dress to perform a string of ballads including "Come Back to Me", "Again" and "Let's Wait Awhile." After another wardrobe change, she came back out to perform a mixture of old and new songs including "So Excited", "Together Again", "Nasty", "Escapade", "That's the Way Love Goes", "Luv" and "Rhythm Nation".

Her duets with Nelly, Q-Tip and Dave Navarro had the musicians appearing on a pre-recorded video and performing their verses while Janet sang on stage. Other notable performances of the night include the Pre-"Control" medley, in which Jackson performs songs she has never done before live from her first two albums Janet Jackson and Dream Street, as well as an S&M display on-stage with a lucky audience member to perform the title track off Jackson's tour supporting album, Discipline. During the performance, she had her dancers pull up a male audience member and strap him into a harness; he was then suspended midair as Jackson teased him with a highly suggestive set of moves and the breathy soft-core porn of the track. For the finale of the show, Jackson and her dancers perform "Luv" and Jackson's top-five hit, "Runaway".

== Critical reception ==
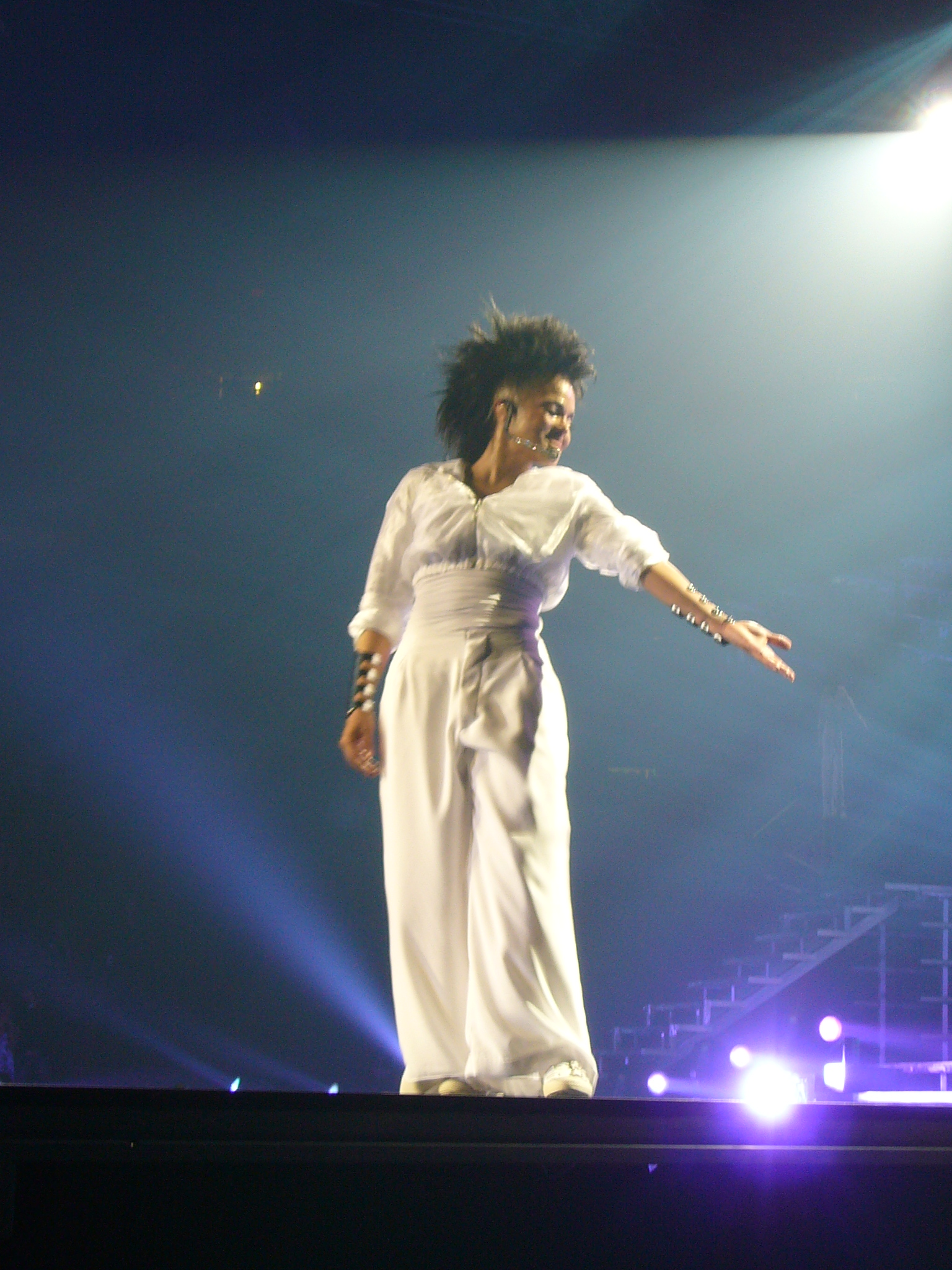
Janet performing ‘Runaway’ during the finale of the show.

The tour was met with rave reviews from critics, who praised the show’s production and choreography and commended Jackson’s dancing and showmanship. Tim Henley of NewsOK wrote that, "Despite the fact that she is 42-years-old, Janet still gave a high energy performance from start to finish. She danced during the entire show, and her choreography was on point. She put Britney, Beyoncé and Usher to shame. Janet has officially solidified herself as the queen.” Marsha Lederman of The Globe and Mail claimed that "The most memorable moment of the Vancouver show came almost halfway through, when Jackson, dressed in a gold and black glam hip hop-inspired track suit (and one gold glove), stopped on the catwalk after her hit 'Together Again', listened to the crowd roar its approval, and became emotional – really emotional." Lederman called the show, "a fun, glitzy choreographed experience worthy of a woman who's been in show business longer than most of the people in the audience have been alive. Bravo." Rap-Up magazine wrote that, "There are few artists in 2008 who can pack arenas and put on a spectacle the way Janet Jackson can, and last night was proof that Janet's fans still remain loyal to the icon."

Denise Sheppard of Rolling Stone gave the tour a positive review, writing that Janet "put together a show that was less extravagant in terms of outfits and stage props, attempting instead to bring the bang with pyro and mini-explosions." However, Sheppard criticized "the inclusion of nearly nonsensical video vignettes designed to create a space-age good vs. evil battle", calling it "bizarre". Jason Bracelin of Las Vegas Review-Journal wrote that, "It was a night of sweaty performance art as it was a larger-than-life pop show, with Jackson taking the stage alone at first, without the oversized backing band that most contemporary singers employ to lard up their tunes live." Ann Powers of Los Angeles Times review the Staples Center concert, writing that "Jackson has crafted a spectacle meant to help her finally recover from that Super Bowl incident and prove to those who say she's washed up that, at 42, she still deserves serious attention." However, Powers criticized that, "The elaborate set also made it hard to focus on the charisma of the night's star", saying that its narrative "was painfully unclear and the worst part of the show."

American singer Britney Spears stated the show inspired the choreography for her "Womanizer" video, after attending the concert in Los Angeles. Rehearsals for "Womanizer" were shown on the documentary Britney: For the Record, with Spears saying "I like how it's close together. In Janet's show that's what they did a lot. She did a lot of close stuff like that with the dancers, and it was so powerful". Spears also hired Janet's stylist from the tour for The Circus Starring Britney Spears.

=== Controversies and additional notes ===
During the sound check for the show in Montreal, Jackson "got suddenly ill" and had to be rushed to the hospital. She was later discharged two hours later. After postponing her Montreal show due to an unspecified illness, Jackson also canceled her show in Boston and Philadelphia. According to The Associated Press, Jackson's publicist sent out an e-mail stating that the singer was postponing shows in Greensboro, Atlanta, and Sunrise, stating, "Janet was hoping to resume her tour in an effort not to disappoint her fans. However, after arriving in Greensboro, it became evident that she is not fully recovered. A local doctor advised that she not perform tomorrow." Finally, in November 2008, the postponed dates, along with shows in Uncasville and Verona, were ultimately cancelled due to migraine-associated vertigo. The opening act LL Cool J also announced that he has dropped off the bill due to unspecified "scheduling conflicts."

== Set list ==
The following set list is obtained from the September 10 show in Vancouver. It is not intended to represent all dates throughout the tour.

1. "The Pleasure Principle" / "Control" / "What Have You Done for Me Lately"
2. "Feedback"
3. "You Want This"
4. "Alright" / "Miss You Much" (contains elements of "Rhythm Nation")
5. "Never Letchu Go" / "Come Back to Me" / "Let's Wait Awhile" / "Again"
6. "So Excited"
7. "So Much Betta"
8. "Nasty" (contains elements of "Deep Cover")
9. "All Nite (Don't Stop)"
10. "Rock with U"
11. "Together Again"
12. "Young Love" / "Say You Do" / "Don't Stand Another Chance"
13. "Doesn't Really Matter" / "Escapade" / "Love Will Never Do (Without You)" / "When I Think of You" / "All for You"
14. "Got 'til It's Gone"
15. "Call on Me"
16. "That's the Way Love Goes"
17. "I Get Lonely"
18. "Funny How Time Flies (When You're Having Fun)" / "Any Time, Any Place"
19. "Discipline"
20. "Black Cat"
21. "If"
22. "Rhythm Nation"

Encore

23. "Luv" (contains elements of "Lollipop")
24. "Runaway"

=== Notes ===
- During the Oakland show, Nelly joined Jackson onstage to perform "Call on Me".

== Shows ==
List of concerts, showing date, city, country, venue, opening act, tickets sold, number of available tickets and amount of gross revenue
Date	City	Country	Venue	Opening act	Attendance	Revenue
North America
September 10, 2008	Vancouver	Canada	General Motors Place	Hedspin	8,941 / 11,074	$928,936
September 13, 2008	Oakland	United States	Oracle Arena	Nelly	9,430 / 12,282	$809,478
September 17, 2008	Los Angeles	United States	Staples Center	LL Cool J	12,109 / 13,025	$1,181,045
September 19, 2008	Las Vegas	United States	Mandalay Bay Events Center	—N/a	8,085 / 8,168	$1,027,602
September 20, 2008	San Diego	United States	San Diego Sports Arena	—N/a	4,844 / 9,678	$518,595
September 25, 2008	Rosemont	United States	Allstate Arena	LL Cool J	9,519 / 11,541	$792,139
September 28, 2008	Toronto	Canada	Air Canada Centre	LL Cool J	8,202 / 12,000	$927,130
October 15, 2008	Washington, D.C.	United States	Verizon Center	—N/a	9,720 / 10,389	$1,077,846
October 17, 2008	East Rutherford	United States	Izod Center	—N/a	10,865 / 14,247	$883,472
October 19, 2008	Atlanta	United States	Philips Arena	—N/a	7,503 / 9,698	$665,775
October 21, 2008	Houston	United States	Toyota Center	LL Cool J DJ Playboy	7,090 / 7,470	$548,039
October 22, 2008	Dallas	United States	American Airlines Center	LL Cool J DJ Playboy	7,729 / 11,640	$532,393
October 24, 2008	Kansas City	United States	Sprint Center	—N/a	7,108 / 8,226	$382,427
October 26, 2008	Tulsa	United States	BOK Center	—N/a	5,355 / 6,208	$231,690
October 28, 2008	Auburn Hills	United States	The Palace of Auburn Hills	—N/a	7,733 / 9,687	$441,578
November 1, 2008	New York City	United States	Madison Square Garden	DJ Juan	9,955 / 12,029	$799,083
Total					134,188 / 166,492 (80%)	$11,747,228

== Cancelled shows ==
List of cancelled concerts, showing date, city, country, venue and reason for cancellation
Date	City	Country	Venue	Reason
September 29, 2008	Montreal	Canada	Bell Centre	Migraine-associated vertigo
October 1, 2008	Boston	United States	TD Banknorth Garden	Migraine-associated vertigo
October 2, 2008	Philadelphia	United States	Wachovia Center	Migraine-associated vertigo
October 4, 2008	Greensboro	United States	Greensboro Coliseum	Migraine-associated vertigo
October 7, 2008	Sunrise	United States	Bank Atlantic Center	Migraine-associated vertigo
October 11, 2008	Uncasville	United States	Mohegan Sun Arena	Migraine-associated vertigo
October 13, 2008	Verona	United States	Turning Stone Event Center	Migraine-associated vertigo
February 14, 2009	Saitama	Japan	Saitama Super Arena	Illness and 2009 economic crisis
February 15, 2009	Saitama	Japan	Saitama Super Arena	Illness and 2009 economic crisis
February 17, 2009	Osaka	Japan	Osaka-jō Hall	Illness and 2009 economic crisis
February 19, 2009	Nagoya	Japan	Nagoya Rainbow Hall	Illness and 2009 economic crisis
February 22, 2009	Fukuoka	Japan	Marine Messe Fukuoka	Illness and 2009 economic crisis

== Personnel ==
Show Director
Janet Jackson & Gil Duldulao

Promoter
Leonard Rowe

Creative Director and Choreographer
Gil Duldulao

Choreographer
Ed Moore

Assistant to Creative Director & Choreographer
Stephani Kammer

Band

- Adam Blackstone (Musical Director/Bass)
- Dave Navarro (Guitars)
- Lil' John Roberts (Drums)
- Daniel Jones (Keyboards)
- Jae Deal (programming, orchestration)

Costumes
Donatella Versace

Lighting and Set Design
Vince Foster

FOH Sound Engineer
Jon Lemon

Pyrotechnics Design
Lorenzo Cornacchia (Vice President of Pyrotek Special Effects)

Dancers

Gil Duldulao (Choreographer), Ed Moore (Choreographer), Jillian Meyers, Laurel Thompson, Nick Bass, Teddy Forance, Cassidy Noblett, Josh Ortiz, Victor Rojas, Whyley Yoshimura, Anthony Garza (Swing Dancer)
