= List of Billboard 200 number-one albums of 2008 =

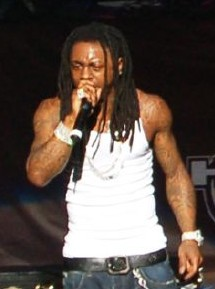
Hip hop artist Lil Wayne's sixth studio album, Tha Carter III, was the highest-selling record of 2008.

The highest-selling albums and EPs in the United States are ranked in the Billboard 200, which is published by Billboard magazine. The data are compiled by Nielsen Soundscan based on each album's weekly physical and digital sales. In 2008, 38 albums advanced to the peak position of the chart.

Singer-songwriter Taylor Swift's Fearless is her first number-one album and had the longest run among the releases that have reached peak position in 2008, spending 11 non-consecutive weeks beginning with the issue dated November 29 and continuing into the 2009 chart year. She is the only singer to have achieved the longest-running album as a country female recording act in the Billboard 200 history. Swift is now ranked fifth on the list of solo female artists with the longest-running number-one album in Billboard history, tied with veterans Mariah Carey and Whitney Houston. Other albums with extended chart runs include Jack Johnson's fifth studio album, Sleep Through the Static, and Metallica's ninth studio album, Death Magnetic; each spent three straight weeks on the chart. Three soundtrack albums topped the chart in 2008: Juno, Mamma Mia! and Twilight.

Hip hop artist Lil Wayne's Tha Carter III is the highest-selling album of 2008 in the US, selling 2.874 million copies since its release. The album attained the most sales in a week, netting over one million units after a week of release, a feat previously accomplished in 2005. The second best-selling album of the year is alternative rock band Coldplay's Viva la Vida or Death and All His Friends with 2.144 million copies sold, followed by Swift's Fearless with 2.112 million. It is also the best-selling album in digital format, having topped the Billboard Top Digital Albums of 2008. Alternative rock band Radiohead's In Rainbows had the most vinyl albums sold in 2008, amounting to 26,000 units.

Pop singer Madonna scored her seventh number-one album, Hard Candy, making her the female act with the second most number-one albums in the United States. R&B singer Mariah Carey earned her sixth number-one album in 2008 with E=MC², tying her with R&B singer Janet Jackson for third place for most number-one albums by a female act. E=MC² opened at number one on the chart for selling 463,000 copies, outselling Carey's previous albums' debut figures. Neil Diamond achieved the first number one album of his career with Home Before Dark 42 years after his first chart entry.

== Chart history ==
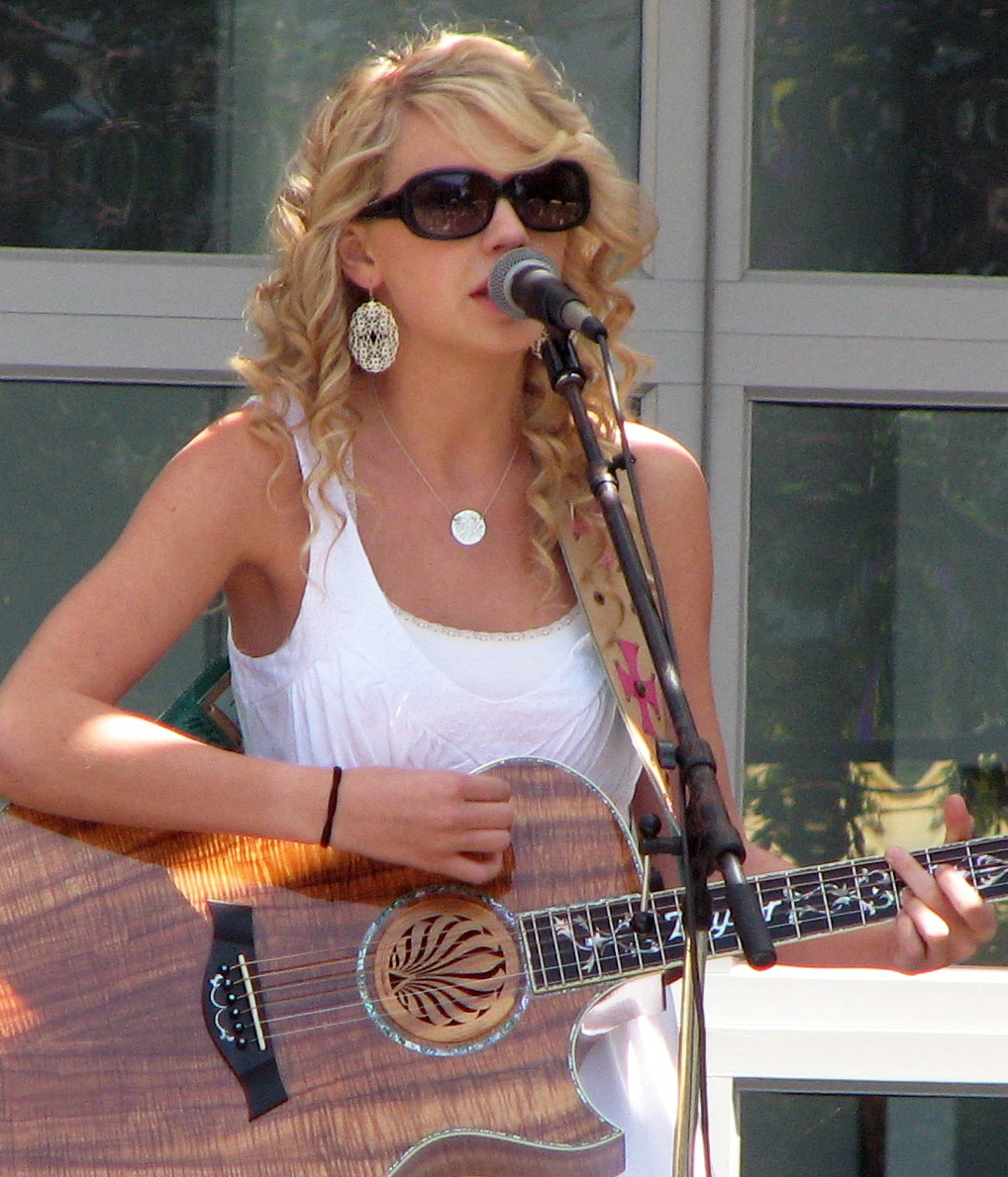
Country singer-songwriter Taylor Swift's Fearless is her first number-one album and the longest-running number-one album from 2008, topping the chart for 11 non-consecutive weeks.

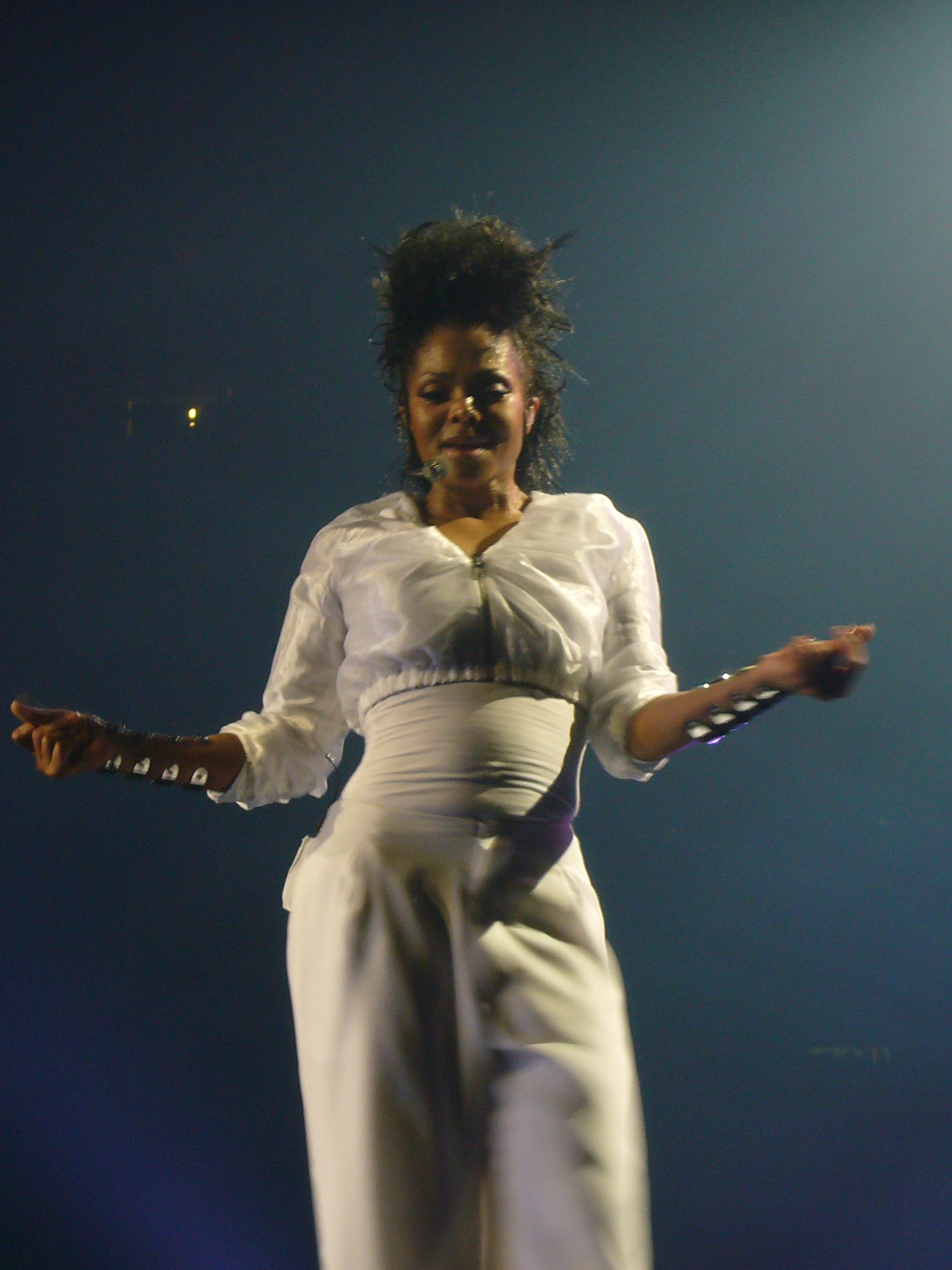
Singer Janet Jackson scored her sixth number-one album, Discipline.

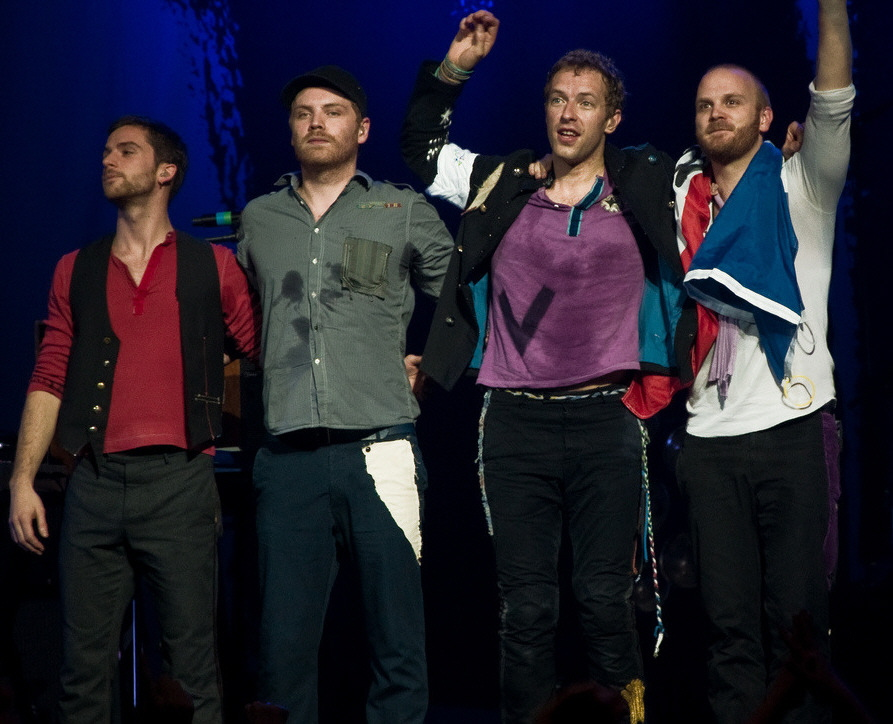
British rock band Coldplay's Viva la Vida or Death and All His Friends sold the most digital albums in 2008.

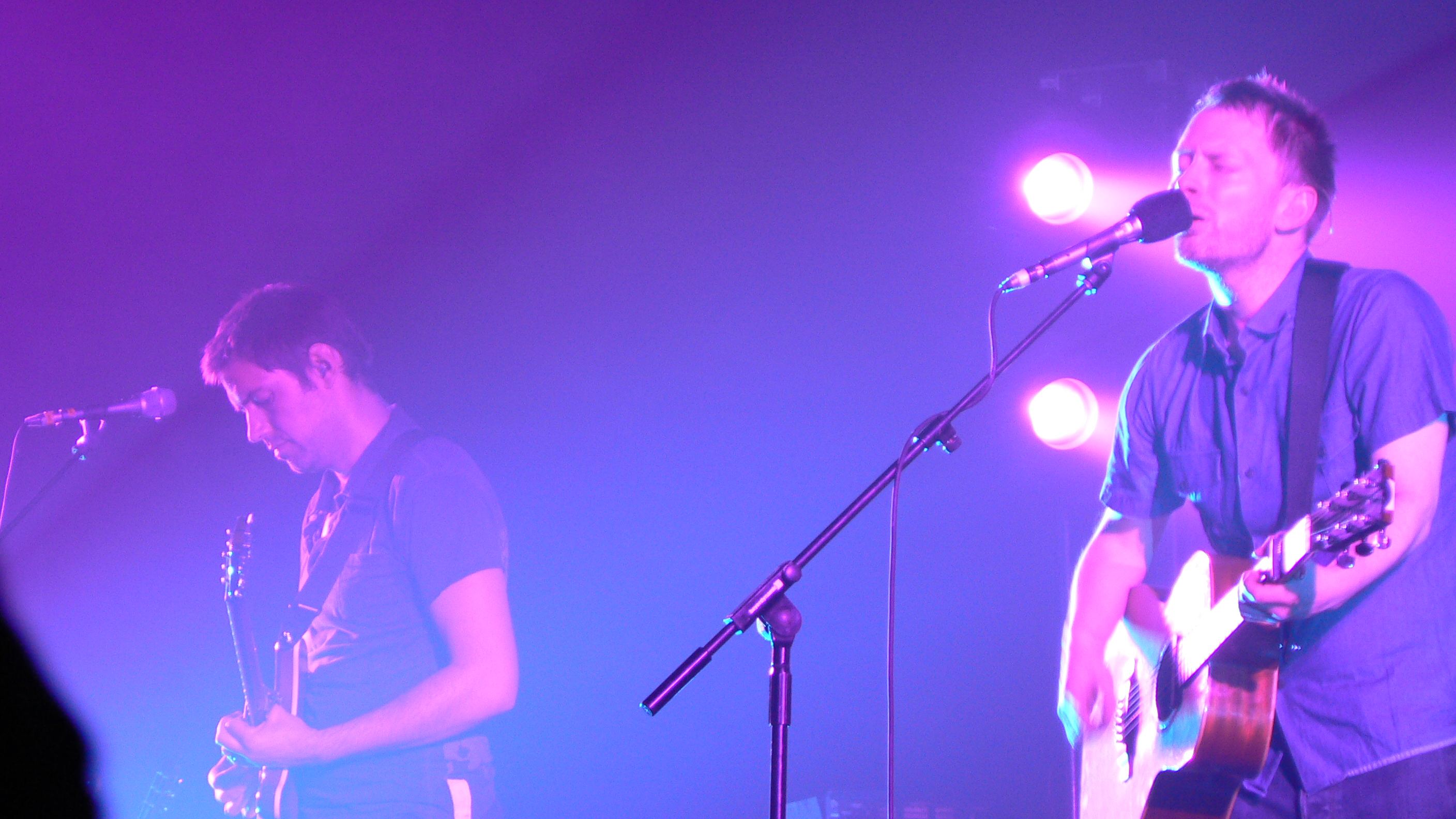
British rock band Radiohead sold the most vinyl formats in 2008 with In Rainbows.

Key
†	Indicates best performing album of 2008

Issue date	Album	Artist(s)	Sales	Ref.
January 5	Noël	Josh Groban	757,000	
January 12	Growing Pains	Mary J. Blige	204,000	
January 19	In Rainbows	Radiohead	122,000	
January 26	As I Am †	Alicia Keys	103,000	
February 2	As I Am †	Alicia Keys	61,000	
February 9	Music from the Motion Picture Juno	Soundtrack	65,000	
February 16	As I Am †	Alicia Keys	61,000	
February 23	Sleep Through the Static	Jack Johnson	375,000	
March 1	Sleep Through the Static	Jack Johnson	180,000	
March 8	Sleep Through the Static	Jack Johnson	105,000	
March 15	Discipline	Janet Jackson	181,000	
March 22	Good Time	Alan Jackson	119,000	
March 29	Trilla	Rick Ross	198,000	
April 5	Welcome to the Dollhouse	Danity Kane	236,000	
April 12	Day26	Day26	190,000	
April 19	Troubadour	George Strait	166,000	
April 26	Spirit	Leona Lewis	205,000	
May 3	E=MC²	Mariah Carey	463,000	
May 10	E=MC²	Mariah Carey	182,000	
May 17	Hard Candy	Madonna	280,000	
May 24	Home Before Dark	Neil Diamond	146,000	
May 31	Narrow Stairs	Death Cab for Cutie	144,000	
June 7	3 Doors Down	3 Doors Down	154,000	
June 14	Here I Stand	Usher	433,000	
June 21	Indestructible	Disturbed	252,000	
June 28	Tha Carter III	Lil Wayne	1,006,000	
July 5	Viva la Vida or Death and All His Friends	Coldplay	721,000	
July 12	Viva la Vida or Death and All His Friends	Coldplay	249,000	
July 19	Tha Carter III	Lil Wayne	156,000	
July 26	Tha Carter III	Lil Wayne	125,000	
August 2	Untitled	Nas	187,000	
August 9	Breakout	Miley Cyrus	371,000	
August 16	Love on the Inside	Sugarland	171,000	
August 23	Mamma Mia! The Movie Soundtrack	Soundtrack	130,000	
August 30	A Little Bit Longer	Jonas Brothers	525,000	
September 6	A Little Bit Longer	Jonas Brothers	147,000	
September 13	All Hope Is Gone	Slipknot	240,000	
September 20	The Recession	Young Jeezy	260,000	
September 27	Death Magnetic	Metallica	490,000	
October 4	Death Magnetic	Metallica	337,000	
October 11	Death Magnetic	Metallica	132,000	
October 18	Paper Trail	T.I.	568,000	
October 25	Paper Trail	T.I.	177,000	
November 1	Lucky Old Sun	Kenny Chesney	176,000	
November 8	Black Ice	AC/DC	784,000	
November 15	Black Ice	AC/DC	271,000	
November 22	Twilight: Original Motion Picture Soundtrack	Soundtrack	165,000	
November 29	Fearless	Taylor Swift	592,000	
December 6	I Am… Sasha Fierce	Beyoncé	482,000	
December 13	808s & Heartbreak	Kanye West	450,000	
December 20	Circus	Britney Spears	505,000	
December 27	Fearless	Taylor Swift	249,000	

== See also ==
- 2008 in music
- List of number-one albums (United States)
