= Discipline (Janet Jackson album) =

Studio album by Janet Jackson
- Released: February 22, 2008
- Recorded: July 2007 – January 2008
- Studios: Carrington House; SouthSide; Triangle Sound (Atlanta); 2nd Floor Studios (Atlantic City); The Boom Boom Room (Burbank); DoRohn Entertainment (Detroit); DML (East Orange); Flyte Time (Edina); Studio at the Palms (Las Vegas); The Village (Los Angeles); Choice (Miami); Legacy; Platinum Sound; Roc the Mic (New York City)
- Genres: Pop; electronic; R&B
- Length: 53:55
- Label: Island Def Jam
- Producers: Rodney "Darkchild" Jerkins; D'Mile; Jermaine Dupri; David "DoRohn" Gough; Chuck Harmony; Janet Jackson; Terius "The-Dream" Nash; Stargate; Christopher "Tricky" Stewart; Shea Taylor

Janet Jackson chronology
20 Y.O. (2006)	Discipline (2008)	Number Ones (2009)

Singles from Discipline
- 1. "Feedback" Released: December 26, 2007; 2. "Rock with U" Released: February 5, 2008; 3. "Luv" Released: February 11, 2008; 4. "Can't B Good" Released: March 18, 2008

Discipline is the tenth studio album by American singer Janet Jackson. It was released on February 22, 2008, by Island Records. It is her only album released with the record label after her five-album deal with Virgin Records was fulfilled with the release of 20 Y.O. (2006). Jackson worked with producers such as Darkchild, Ne-Yo, Shea Taylor, Stargate, Johntá Austin, Jermaine Dupri, Tricky Stewart, and The-Dream on the album. Jackson's long-time producers Jimmy Jam and Terry Lewis did not contribute to the project. The album was executive produced by Island Urban president Dupri and Jackson. The album experimented with the electropop, house, and dance-pop genres and also contained R&B and hip-hop-oriented tracks.

The album received mixed reviews, with critics admitting that it was an improvement on Jackson's two previous albums. It debuted at number one on the US Billboard 200, becoming her sixth album to top the chart, and her first number-one since All for You (2001). However, sales of the album quickly fell, and by June 2008, the album's promotion had officially ended. Jackson started her Rock Witchu Tour—with the support of Live Nation—in early September to positive reviews, but by the end of that month, Jackson parted with her record label per her request due to the lack of promotion. Four singles were released from the album: the lead single "Feedback" reached number nineteen on the US Billboard Hot 100, becoming Jackson's best charting single since 2001's "Someone to Call My Lover", while the following singles–"Rock with U", "Luv" and "Can't B Good"–did not match the success of "Feedback".

== Recording and production ==
In July 2007, after her five-album deal with Virgin Records was fulfilled with the release of her album 20 Y.O., Jackson signed a recording contract with Island Records, who asked her to immediately record a new album, which would become Discipline. Jackson was in "full-blown tour rehearsals" for touring the 20 Y.O. album at that point, "learning numbers, getting everything together, set designs", etc, and had no songs ready for a new album, so Jackson has no song-writing credits on the album for the first time since Dream Street (1984).

The album was recorded during a six-month period at locations in Burbank, Los Angeles, Las Vegas, Edina, Detroit, New York City, East Orange, Atlantic City, Atlanta and Miami. Jackson worked with producers such as Rodney Jerkins (who produced the lead single "Feedback" alongside D'Mile), Jermaine Dupri, Ne-Yo, Shea Taylor, Stargate, Johntá Austin, Tricky Stewart, and The-Dream. Jackson's long-time producers Jimmy Jam and Terry Lewis, did not contribute to the project. The album was executive produced by Island Urban president Jermaine Dupri and Jackson. She did not write or co-write any songs on the album, a departure from her usual practice of co-writing and producing all of the songs on her albums. The song "So Much Betta" contains sampled portions of the track "Daftendirekt" by the French house music duo Daft Punk.

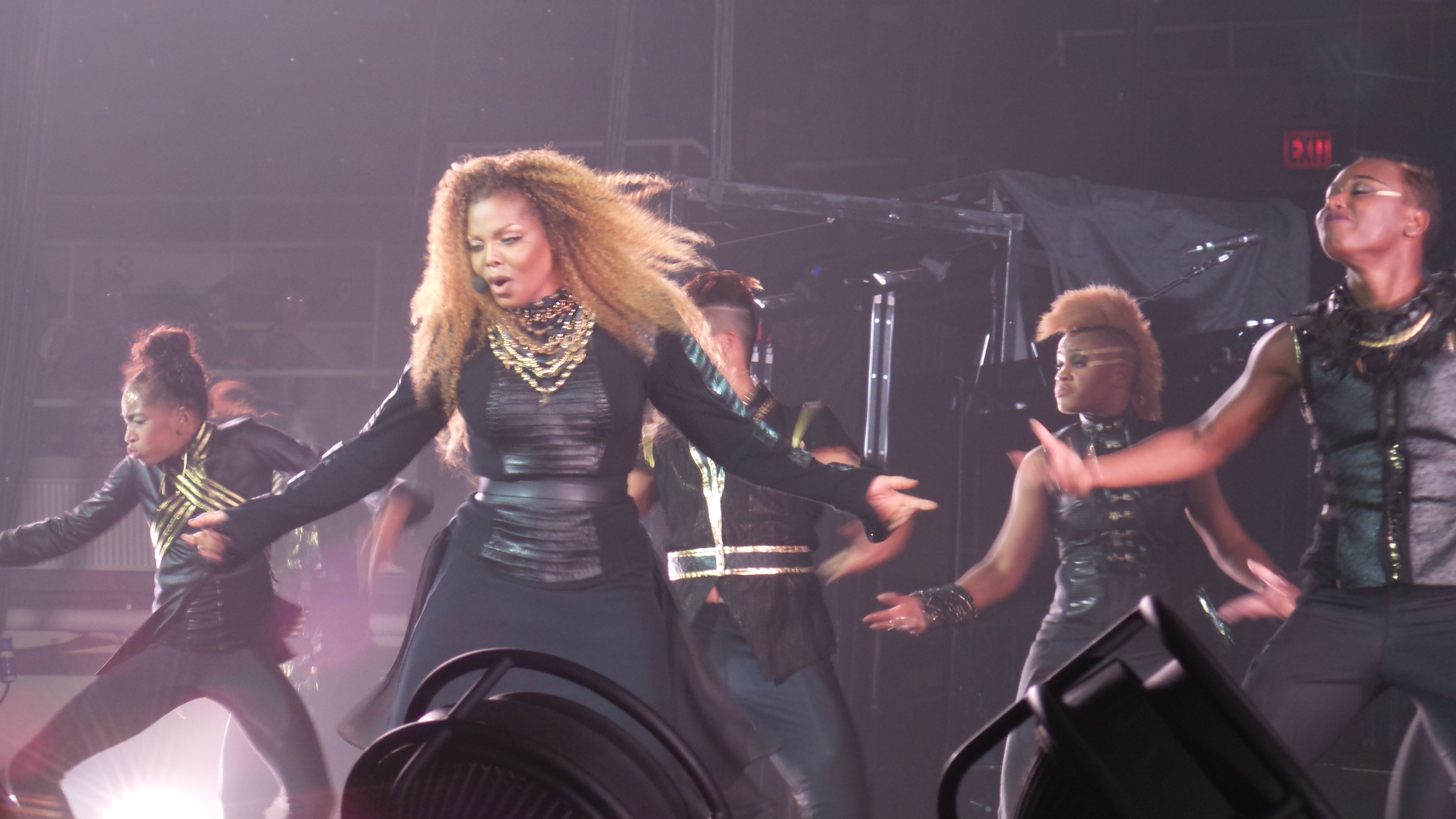
Jackson and her dancers performing Discipline's lead single, "Feedback" during Jackson's Unbreakable Tour (2015-16).

The deluxe edition of Discipline included a DVD entitled The Making of Discipline, split into five chapters which document the production of the album, its promotion, and the "Feedback" music video. The first chapter, entitled "Photo Shoots", shows Jackson creating a new image for the album and adopting different looks for different markets. She spent two days working on photos for the cover and credit booklet, revealing that she still feels uncomfortable in front of the camera despite two decades in the music industry. In the second chapter, "The Studio", Jackson expressed her opinion on recording work, stating that although she usually enjoyed the experience, it was, at times, tedious. She discusses further how her songs are built up in layers and parts, from melodies and background vocals or sounds. The third chapter, "Rehearsals", shows the rehearsals of the dance routine for the "Feedback" music video. The DVD reveals that the eight dancers had been practicing for over a week before they started working with Jackson. The dancers then had three days to rehearse with Jackson and a further two days to complete the video. Jackson described the video as a metaphor for sexual tension. The fourth chapter, "Behind the Video", shows the making of the video itself. Jackson told the director that she wanted a futuristic, moody concept, and he came up with the idea of jumping between planets. The final chapter is the lead music video in its entirety.

== Music and lyrics ==
Discipline is a pop, electronic and R&B album with some house and hip-hop-oriented songs. Lyrically, it explores erotic themes such as sexual fetishism and sadomasochism, along with other themes such as love and relationships. Throughout the album, Jackson interacts with a fictional DJ-robot Kyoko.

The album opens with a 48-second spoken-word intro "I.D.", which is followed by the lead single "Feedback". "Feedback" is an electropop and dance-pop song which incorporates elements of Eurodance and hip-hop. Its lyrical composition is based on Jackson's sexual bravado, questioning the listener while responding with a chant of "sexy, sexy". The song's chorus compares her body to instruments such as a guitar and amplifier, using metaphors to demonstrate sexual climax. It's followed by "Luv", an electro-R&B song described as a "feel-good" clap-and-bounce track, in which Jackson relates a car crash to falling in love. "Rollercoaster", an electro-funk song, sees Jackson comparing feelings caused by her love interest to a rollercoaster. "Rock with U" is a pop, Euro disco, and house song recorded with the gay community in mind, as Jackson felt the necessity to do something for her gay fans, as well as the wider community members. Jackson said: "It's still classic me but with a different twist to it – a modern twist". Jim Farber from New York Daily News noted the song's riffs, which he considered greater when they first appeared in Madonna's song "Into the Groove" (1985). The song was compared to Jackson's brother Michael Jackson's "Rock with You" (1979), due to its disco themes. "Rock with U" also contains vocodered whispers and murmured vocals. On "2nite", Jackson is asking her partner to sexually please her.

"Can't B Good" is a soulful, "jazzy" R&B song about Jackson's relationship with Jermaine Dupri. "Never Letchu Go" was described by Andy Kellman from AllMusic as "a sweet, glistening ballad". Its lyrics see Jackson not wanting to end her relationship because she feels like her partner is "the one". "Greatest X" is an R&B ballad which, as its title suggests, is an open letter to Jackson's "greatest ex ever". "So Much Betta" samples "Daftendirekt" (1997) by Daft Punk and sees Jackson "tired of being number two" and trying to prove a man she's better for him than her rival. The song also contains vocodered vocals. Like "So Much Betta", "The 1" sees Jackson trying to convince her love interest she's "the one" for him. It features rapper Missy Elliott. "What's Ur Name" is an up-tempo electro-R&B song on which Jackson sings about meeting a man for the first time. After discussing the meaning of the term "discipline" in the interlude "The Meaning", Jackson begs her partner to "punish" her in "Discipline"; its lyrical themes include masturbation and sadomasochism. The album closes with "Curtains", an R&B song which sees Jackson putting on a show for her lover in the form of foreplay and filming it.

== Title and artwork ==
The album was titled Discipline as an acknowledgment of Jackson's commitment, focus, and dedication to her career. Jackson stated: "I wanted to name the album Discipline because it has a lot of different meanings for me, but the most important would be work — to have done this for as long as I have ... And to have had the success that I've had — not excluding God by any means — but it takes a great deal of focus." However, in the album's title track, the title has a different meaning, as its lyrics see the protagonist asking her partner to discipline her for "being bad".

The cover artwork for Discipline was shot by Singaporean fashion photography duo Chuando + Frey and features Jackson as a dominatrix, wearing long black latex gloves with "Discipline" and "Janet" ("Janet Jackson" on some editions) written on them.

== Release and promotion ==
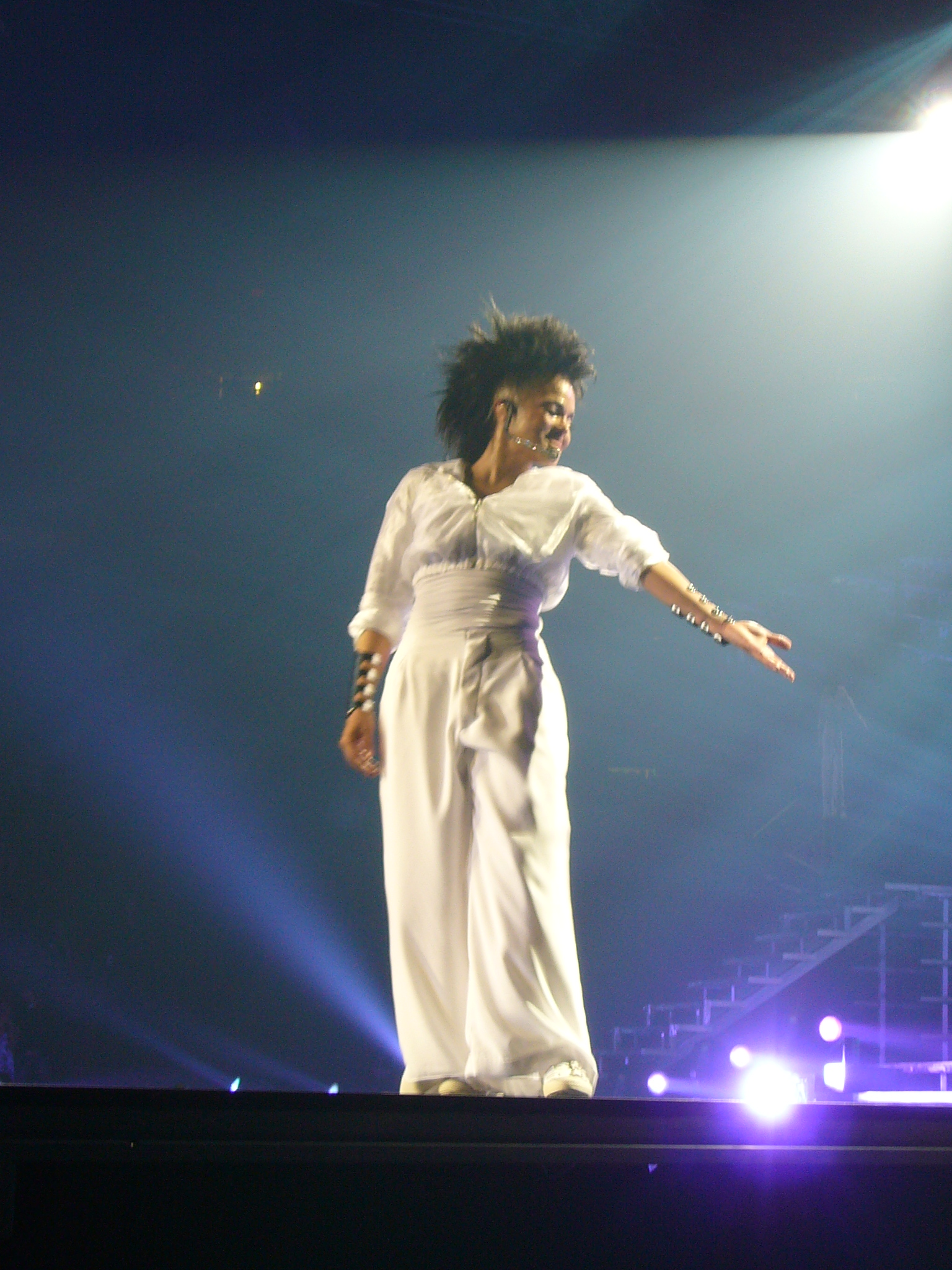
Jackson performing during the Rock Witchu Tour.

Discipline was released on February 26, 2008 by Island Records; its deluxe edition, which included a bonus DVD, was released simultaneously. Jackson promoted the album through televised performances on Good Morning America, The Ellen DeGeneres Show and MTV's Total Request Live. Her performance on Total Request Live was her first MTV appearance in six years, following her being blacklisted by the network due to the Super Bowl halftime show incident in 2004. She was also scheduled to perform on Saturday Night Live but cancelled it due to illness. Performances on Jimmy Kimmel Live and at the London nightclub G-A-Y were also initially planned. The album was also promoted during an appearance on Larry King Live. On March 31, 2008, an edition of Discipline in environmentally-friendly packaging was released exclusively in Walmart as a part of a "green" promotion. Island Records officially ended the promotion of the album by June 2008. Later, Jackson performed "Luv" in a medley with "Rhythm Nation" on the ABC special America United: In Support of Our Troops on September 7.

Although the album promotion stopped in June, Jackson's fifth concert tour—the North American Rock Witchu Tour, with the support of Live Nation—began on September 10, 2008. Amy O'Brian of The Vancouver Sun described Jackson's stage show at the GM Place as a "high-voltage performance". According to O'Brian, "[w]ith an ear-piercing blast of pyrotechnics, a fog of thick cloud and dancers that popped up out of the stage and runway, Jackson proved within the first minutes that she didn't choose the low-budget route for her Rock Witchu Tour." Similarly, Jim Harrington of The Oakland Tribune offered a positive review, stating: "Like Jackson's previous tours, 'Rock Witchu' was a flashy, high-budget extravaganza built on well-choreographed dance routines and plenty of theatrics." The initial response to the tour was positive, with sold-out shows in Los Angeles and Las Vegas. Supporting acts for the show included LL Cool J and Donnie Klang. Jackson had to reschedule nine dates on the first leg of the tour due to vestibular migraines. However, on November 4, 2008, Jackson canceled seven of the nine shows which had been rescheduled, citing scheduling conflicts. On November 19, it was announced that Jackson would bring the tour to Japan for a series of five shows in Saitama, Nagoya, Osaka, and Fukuoka in February 2009, but all five dates were canceled. Due to the cancellations, the tour's final date was on November 1, 2008, in New York City.

== Singles ==
The album's lead single "Feedback", was released for digital download in December 2007. In the United States, the song reached number nineteen on the Billboard Hot 100, number thirty-nine on the Hot R&B/Hip-Hop Songs, and number twenty-three on the Pop 100, becoming Jackson's best charting single since "Someone to Call My Lover" (2001). The song was also successful in Canada and South Africa where it peaked at numbers three and eight, respectively. Due to a rushed release and no international promotion, the song failed to chart highly in European countries, peaking at number thirty-six in France and thirty-two in Ireland, but reaching the top five in Greece.

Subsequent singles were promoted and released primarily in the US. "Rock with U", the second single, was released on February 5, 2008. A music video was released, with the song peaking at number twenty on the Dance Club Songs chart and at number four on the UK R&B Singles Chart. Two more singles–"Luv" and "Can't B Good"–were issued to select radio formats. "Luv" was released on February 11, 2008 and peaked at number thirty-four on the Hot R&B/Hip-Hop Songs. "Can't B Good", was serviced to urban contemporary radio on March 18, 2008. The song "2nite", although not released as a single, was featured on the second part of the soundtrack to the film Sex and the City (2008), entitled Sex and the City, Vol. 2: More Music.

== Critical reception ==
Professional ratings
Aggregate scores
Source	Rating
Metacritic	61/100
Review scores
Source	Rating
AllMusic	4/5 stars
The A.V. Club	B
Entertainment Weekly	C−
Dotmusic	7/10
The Guardian	2/5 stars
Los Angeles Times	3/4 stars
PopMatters	5/10
NOW	4/5 stars
Rolling Stone	3.5/5 stars
Slant Magazine	3/5 stars

Discipline received mixed to positive reviews from most music critics. At Metacritic, which assigns a normalized rating out of 100 to reviews from mainstream critics, the album received an average score of 61, based on 14 reviews, which indicates "generally favorable reviews".

Music critic Keith Harris of Rolling Stone wrote, "Janet Jackson has abandoned the plastic R&B of 2006's 20 Y.O. for a sexier brand of digitized megapop [...] you can dismiss any images of the abusive Jackson clan that flit into your mind. Just lie back and enjoy the sensations as pure aural auto-eroticism." Andy Kellman of AllMusic gave a four-out-of-five star rating, noting several tracks were "as innocent, universal, and inviting as anything else in Janet's past", and called the songs "Rock with U" and "2Nite" "irresistible, grade-A dance floor tracks". Sal Cinquemani of Slant Magazine described it as Jackson's "most cohesive album in a while", giving three-out-of-five stars. Dan Gennoe of Yahoo! Music UK gave it seven out of ten stars saying "Still, if not perfect, there's plenty to like on Discipline, and while none of it is exactly vintage Janet, there's enough here to keep the Jackson name on pop's A-list for a little while longer."

Carol Cooper of The Village Voice called Discipline "the most cohesive deep-groove album from La Jackson since Control." NOW Magazine reviewer Bryan Borzykowski called it "her most modern and club friendly" album, and commented saying "Jackson wouldn't want us to call it a comeback, but it sure sounds like one." Ann Powers of the Los Angeles Times gave it a three out of four rating, saying "Its 22 tracks should be two albums: The first, a club-directed missile helmed by "Darkchild" Rodney Jerkins and Jackson's beau, Jermaine Dupri, could reassert Jackson's primacy among glamazon hit makers; the second, a bedroom bound ladies' favorite co-authored by soul dauphin Ne-Yo, would remind fans of Jackson's gift for creating truly tender smut."

The Boston Globe music critic Joan Anderman criticized the album, saying "Jackson's decision to recycle the nympho routine one more time is just boring [...] A quarter century into her career, it was Jackson's moment to take a breath, dig a little deeper, and make a bold - or at least a different - statement. Instead, she has trussed herself up in vinyl to coo another batch of digitized porn." On a better note, she called the tracks "Rollercoaster" and "Luv" "engaging tracks", describing them as a "sassy-sweet side" and "a plump, crackling confection", respectively.

New York Times music critic Kelefa Sanneh felt that, "If anything, Discipline may be too subtle: a pretty, smartly produced collection that sometimes sounds like background music." Michael Arceneaux of PopMatters called the album the "same old from her", adding, "These days her look and sound seem nothing more than a continuation of 2001's All for You." Entertainment Weekly's Margeaux Watson wrote that Jackson's lyrics "sound like the cheesy text messages of a lovesick adolescent" and gave a C− rating. Nick Levine of Digital Spy wrote that "Jackson's attempts to play the uber-nympho are beginning to sound very, very desperate" with "embarrassingly lewd lyrics" and gave the record 2 out of 5 stars. Caroline Sullivan of The Guardian described most tracks on the album as either boring or unmemorable. Robert Christgau gave the album a "dud" score as he had done with her previous album 20 Y.O..

== Accolades ==
Accolades for Discipline
Year	Award	Category	Recipient	Result	Ref.
2008	HX Awards	Best Song of the Year	"Feedback"	Nominated	
2009	International Dance Music Awards	Best Pop Dance Track	"Feedback"	Nominated	
2009	International Dance Music Awards	Best House/Garage Track	"Feedback"	Nominated	
2009	International Dance Music Awards	Best Urban Dance Track	"Feedback"	Nominated	

== Commercial performance ==
Discipline debuted at number one on the Billboard 200 for the issue dated ending March 15, 2008, with 181,000 copies sold. While this was a higher chart position than Jackson's two previous releases, it was a lower first week sales total compared to Damita Jo which opened with sales of 381,000 and 20 Y.O. with sales of 296,000. Paul Grein of Yahoo! Music observed that with six number one studio albums, Jackson had "surpasse[d] her brother Michael Jackson, who has amassed five [number-one] albums." With six number one albums, Jackson is now tied with Mariah Carey and Britney Spears in the US for the third most number-one albums for a female artist, behind Madonna with eight and Barbra Streisand's ten chart-toppers. In its second week, the album fell to number three with 57,000 copies sold. In its third week, the album fell to number eight with sales of 38,000 copies. In its fourth week, the album fell to number seventeen with sales of 34,000 copies, achieving total first-month sales of 310,000 copies. It has moved over 600,000 units in the United States to date.

The album achieved moderate success in other countries, reaching number three in Canada (with 6,000 copies sold during its first week), and number nine in Switzerland, but had low sales in most European markets. By June 2008, Island stopped promoting Discipline. The singer expressed open dissatisfaction with the promotion of the album, explaining that there would be no further single releases. The album was a commercial failure in the United Kingdom, spending only one week on the UK Albums Chart and peaking at number 63 with 3,914 copies sold, but it did manage to peak at number five on the UK R&B Album Chart. It has sold 9,312 copies in the country. In France, Discipline debuted at number 43 with just 3,000 copies sold. In Japan, the album debuted at number nine with 19,839 copies sold. It has been certified gold by the Recording Industry Association of Japan (RIAJ) and has sold over 100,000 copies in the country.

== Label change ==
On September 22, 2008—while on the Live Nation-supported tour of North America—Jackson parted company with her recording label Island; their 14-month relationship was dissolved per a request by Jackson. The singer had previously expressed dissatisfaction with the label, first telling SOHH that they "stopped all promotion whatsoever on the album" after releasing the first single, "Feedback". In early September she had stated, "I can't say if we'll be working with them in the future. I don't know what the future holds between the two of us." A spokesperson for Jackson added, "[Jackson] will have autonomy over her career, without the restrictions of a label system... Always known to break new ground and set trends, Janet's departure from Island Records makes her one of the first superstar artists to have the individual freedom to promote their work through a variety of avenues such as iTunes, mobile carriers and other diverse and innovative channels".

Jackson told Sister 2 Sister magazine, "There were some people who didn't like the direction I took with this album. I love doing dance songs and I think my fans expect that of me. I have been getting more behind the scenes with film and television. I will probably continue to do music – and acting is still a strong passion of mine – but I really have been loving behind-the-scenes work: producing, directing and all the technical stuff". A few months before the split, a spokesperson for the label told Billboard, "Unfortunately we haven't experienced the results we would have liked with this new album. But we respect and support Janet".

== Track listing ==
Discipline – Standard edition
No.	Title	Writer(s)	Producer(s)	Length
1.	"I.D."	Rodney Jerkins; Dernst Emile	Darkchild; D'Mile	0:48
2.	"Feedback"	Jerkins; Emile; Tasleema Yasin; LaShawn Daniels	Darkchild; D'Mile	3:38
3.	"Luv"	Jerkins; Emile; Yasin; Daniels	Darkchild; D'Mile	3:10
4.	"Spinnin"	Jerkins	Darkchild	0:08
5.	"Rollercoaster"	Jerkins; Theron Thomas; Timothy Thomas	Darkchild	3:51
6.	"Bathroom Break"	Jerkins	Darkchild	0:40
7.	"Rock with U"	Shaffer Smith; Jermaine Dupri; Eric Stamile	Dupri; Stamile^{[a]}	3:51
8.	"2nite"	Phillip "Taj" Jackson; Mikkel S. Eriksen; Tor Erik Hermansen	Stargate	4:09
9.	"Can't B Good"	Smith; David Gough	Gough; Ne-Yo^{[a]}	4:13
10.	"4 Words"	Jerkins; Janet Jackson	Darkchild; J. Jackson	0:11
11.	"Never Letchu Go"	Dupri; Johntá Austin; Manuel Seal, Jr.	Dupri; Seal^{[a]}	4:07
12.	"Truth or Dare"	Jerkins; Emile; Daniels; Delisha Thomas	Darkchild; D'Mile	0:24
13.	"Greatest X"	Christopher Stewart; Terius Nash	Tricky Stewart; The-Dream	4:23
14.	"Good Morning Janet"	Jerkins	Darkchild	0:44
15.	"So Much Betta"	Dupri; Crystal Johnson; Seal; Thomas Bangalter; Guy-Manuel de Homem-Christo	Dupri; Seal^{[a]}	2:53
16.	"Play Selection"	Jerkins	Darkchild	0:17
17.	"The 1" (featuring Missy Elliott)	Dupri; Johnson; Seal; Melissa Elliott	Dupri; Seal^{[a]}	3:41
18.	"What's Ur Name"	Dupri; Johnson; Seal	Dupri; Seal^{[a]}	2:34
19.	"The Meaning"	Jerkins; Emile; Daniels; D. Thomas	Darkchild; D'Mile	1:16
20.	"Discipline"	Smith; Shea Taylor	Taylor; Ne-Yo^{[a]}	5:00
21.	"Back"	Jerkins	Darkchild	0:18
22.	"Curtains"	Jerkins; Eric Dawson; Daniels; Antonio Dixon	Darkchild	3:50
Total length:				53:55

Discipline – UK edition (bonus track)
No.	Title	Writer(s)	Producer(s)	Length
23.	"Let Me Know"	Charles Harmon; Smith	Chuck Harmony; Ne-Yo^{[a]}	3:47
Total length:				57:42

Discipline – Japanese and 2023 digital deluxe edition (bonus track)
No.	Title	Writer(s)	Producer(s)	Length
24.	"Feedback" (Ralphi Rosario Electroshok Radio)	Jerkins; Daniels; Emile; Yasin	Darkchild; D'Mile	3:47
Total length:				61:29

Discipline – Deluxe edition (bonus DVD)
No.	Title	Length
1.	"The Photo Shoot"	6:36
2.	"The Recording Studio"	2:22
3.	"Rehearsal"	6:31
4.	"The Making of "Feedback" Video"	10:45
5.	"The "Feedback" Video"	4:16
Total length:		30:30

Notes

- ^{^[a]} signifies a co-producer

Sample credits

- "So Much Betta" contains a sample of "Daftendirekt" performed by Daft Punk.

== Personnel ==
- Janet Jackson – vocals, background vocals, producer, executive producer, vocal producer
- Judi Acosta-Stewart – production coordination
- Ashaunna Ayars – marketing
- Dave Clauss – assistant engineer
- Fran Cooper – make-up
- Carol Corless – package production
- Ian Cross – mixing assistant, vocal engineer, vocal producer
- LaShawn Daniels – vocal arrangement
- Eric Dawkins – background vocals, vocal arrangement
- Mike Donaldson – engineer, digital editing, effects
- The-Dream – producer
- Jermaine Dupri – producer, executive producer, mixing, vocal producer
- Missy Elliott – rap
- Dernst Emile – guitar, producer, vocal arrangement, instrumentation
- Paul Foley – engineer, mixing
- Brian Gardner – mastering
- Kenneth Goh – stylist
- David Gough – producer
- Kuk Harrell – engineer
- Tor Erik Hermanson – instrumentation
- John Horesco IV – guitar, engineer, vocal engineer
- Josh Houghkirk – engineer
- Kegan Houston – assistant engineer
- Ernie Isley – guitar
- Rodney Jerkins – producer, mixing, instrumentation
- Doug Joswick – package production
- Daniel Laporte – engineer
- Jaymz Hardy Martin III – engineer
- Diane McDonald – production coordination
- Ne-Yo – co-producer
- No I.D. – producer
- Carlos Oyanedel – assistant
- Dave Pensado – mixing
- R. City – vocals
- J. Peter Robinson – art direction, packaging
- Manuel Seal, Jr. – co-producer, vocal producer
- Telisha Shaw – vocals
- Chris Soper – assistant engineer
- Eric Stamile – co-producer
- Stargate – producers
- Tricky Stewart – producer
- Phil Tan – mixing, vocal mixing
- Robert "R.T." Taylor – electric guitar
- Angie Teo – assistant engineer
- Brian "B Luv" Thomas – engineer
- Delisha Thomas – vocals
- Pat Thrall – engineer
- Roberto Vazquez – engineer, mixing
- Chris Viecco – vocals
- Brian Woodring – engineer
- Andrew Wuepper – mixing assistant
- Janet Zeitoun – hair stylist

== Charts ==
=== Weekly charts ===
Weekly chart performance for Discipline
Chart (2008)	Peak position
Australian Albums (ARIA)	16
Australian Urban Albums (ARIA)	5
Austrian Albums (Ö3 Austria)	45
Belgian Albums (Ultratop Flanders)	46
Belgian Albums (Ultratop Wallonia)	47
Canadian Albums (Billboard)	3
Dutch Albums (Album Top 100)	58
French Albums (SNEP)	58
German Albums (Offizielle Top 100)	38
Hong Kong Albums (IFPI)	8
Irish Albums (IRMA)	60
Italian Albums (FIMI)	54
Japanese Albums (Oricon)	9
Japanese International Albums (Oricon)	3
New Zealand Albums (RMNZ)	35
Norwegian Albums (VG-lista)	30
Spanish Albums (Promusicae)	51
Swedish Albums (Sverigetopplistan)	54
Swiss Albums (Schweizer Hitparade)	9
Taiwanese Albums (Five Music)	1
UK Albums (Official Charts)	63
UK R&B Albums (Official Charts)	5
US Billboard 200	1
US Top R&B/Hip-Hop Albums (Billboard)	1

=== Year-end charts ===
Year-end chart performance for Discipline
Chart (2008)	Position
US Billboard 200	102
US Top R&B/Hip-Hop Albums (Billboard)	27

== Certifications and sales ==
Certifications and sales for Discipline
Region	Certification	Certified units/sales
France	—	10,000
Japan (RIAJ)	Gold	100,000^{^}
United Kingdom	—	9,312
United States	—	456,000
^{^} Shipments figures based on certification alone.

== Release history ==
Release history and formats for Discipline
Region	Date	Edition(s)	Format(s)	Label(s)	Ref.
Australia	February 22, 2008	Standard; deluxe	CD; CD+DVD; digital download; LP	Universal Music	
Germany	February 22, 2008	Standard; deluxe	CD; CD+DVD; digital download; LP	Universal Music	
United Kingdom	February 25, 2008	Standard; deluxe	CD; CD+DVD; digital download; LP	Mercury	
United States	February 26, 2008	Standard; deluxe	CD; CD+DVD; digital download; LP	Island	
Japan	February 27, 2008	Standard; deluxe	CD; CD+DVD; digital download; LP	Universal Music	

== See also ==
- List of Billboard 200 number-one albums of 2008
- List of Billboard number-one R&B albums of 2008
