= Ken Laszlo =

Italian Italo disco singer (born 1954)

- Born: Gianni Coraini; 18 July 1954 (age 72); Florence, Italy
- Occupations: Singer; songwriter; musician
- Years active: 1984–present
- Musical career
- Genres: Italo disco; synth-pop; hi-NRG; Eurodance; Eurobeat
- Instrument: Vocals
- Labels: Time; Memory; SAIFAM

Gianni Coraini (born 18 July 1954), known by his stage name Ken Laszlo, is an Italian singer, songwriter and musician.

Laszlo was interested in music at a young age and his career began in 1980 when he played and sang in discos, bowling alleys, and clubs. His first hit in Europe was the single "Hey Hey Guy" in 1984. His songs "Tonight", "1, 2, 3, 4, 5, 6, 7, 8", "Mary Ann", "Everybody Is Dancing", "Baby Call Me", "Glasses Man", "Don't Cry" are also well known.

Many of Laszlo's songs appear under his own name and many others, under pseudonyms such as Ric Fellini, DJ NRG, and Ricky Maltese.

== Discography ==
=== Albums ===
- Ken Laszlo (1987)
- Dr Ken & Mr Laszlo (1998)
- Future Is Now (2007)

=== Singles ===
- 1984 - "Hey Hey Guy" [#21 France]
- 1985 - "Tonight" [#7 Sweden, #14 Netherlands, #29 France, #26 Belgium]
- 1986 - "Don't Cry" [#13 Sweden]
- 1987 - "1, 2, 3, 4, 5, 6, 7, 8"
- 1987 - "Glasses Man"
- 1988 - "Red Man"/"Black Pearl"
- 1989 - "Everybody Is Dancing"
- 1989 - "Madame"/"Let Me Try"
- 1989 - "Hey Hey Guy for Tonight" (Laszlo & Innocence)
- 1991 - "Happy Song"
- 1991 - "Sha La La"
- 1992 - "Mary Ann"
- 1992 - "Baby Call Me"
- 1994 - "Everytime"
- 1996 - "Whatever Love"
- 2000 - "Video Killed the Radio Star"
- 2003 - "Inside My Music"
- 2009 - "Dancing Together"
- 2011 - "Let's Get It Done Tonight" (feat. Domino)
- 2014 - "Disco Queen" (with ItaLove)
- 2016 - "Let's Dance"
- 2017 - "Fire and Ice"
- 2021 - "Leather Man"
- 2021 - "Stranger"

== Singles under other pseudonyms ==
- Alvin - "A Lovely Night"
- Alvin - "Runaway, Getaway"
- Alvin - "Shocking Fever"
- Alvin - "Tonight Is the Night"
- Artwork - "Party Time"
- Billy The Butcher - "Cannibal Attraction"
- Chris Lang - "Disco Island"
- Coo Coo - "Boogie Woogie"
- Coo Coo - "Easy Lover"
- Coo Coo - "Energy"
- Coo Coo - "Upside Down"
- Coo Coo - "Walkin' on Music"
- Coo Coo - "Winner"
- Coy Mc. Coy - "Island"
- Danny Keith - "Lean on Me"
- Danny Keith - "One More Time"
- Danny Kieth - "Du Du-Da Da"
- Dave Cole - "Space Desire"
- De Niro - "Give It Up"
- DJ NRG - "Bad Boy"
- DJ NRG - "Extasy"
- DJ NRG - "Extasy" (Maio and Co. Remix)
- DJ NRG - "I'm a Dee Jay"
- DJ NRG - "Kamikaze"
- DJ NRG - "Kamikaze" (Maio and Co. Remix)
- DJ NRG - "Ringo Boy"
- DJ NRG - "You Are Number One"
- Francis Cooper - "Night Fly Guy"
- Francis Cooper - "Turbo Night"
- Franz Tornado - "Tornado Superchild"
- Gordon Jim - "Wonder Woman"
- Jaco - "Spanish Run"
- Jeff Driller - "Rocket in My Pocket"
- Jungle Bill - "Master Mind"
- Jungle Bill - "Oh Happy Day"
- Jungle Bill - "Sexy Toy, Sexy Joy"
- Live Music Gang - "Energy People United"
- Lucky Boy - "Listen to My Mistery"
- Malcolm J.Hill - "Fantasy"
- Malcolm J.Hill - "Run to Me"
- Malcolm J.Hill - "Tin Box"
- Mark Tower & Co. - "Don't Cry"
- Michael Dream - "Feel Like Dancing"
- Michael Dream - "Never Say Never"
- Mike Freeman - "Take your Time"
- Mike Freeman - "What Is Real"
- Moreno - "Let's Do It Again"
- Mr. Beat - "Kiss Me Baby"
- Nick Kaye - "Open Your Door"
- Otello - "Olympic Games"
- Remy Panther - "Gimme a Chance"
- Ric Fellini - "All My Loving"
- Ric Fellini - "Stop and Go"
- Ric Fellini - "Welcome to Rimini"
- Ricky Maltese - "Mama"
- Ricky Maltese - "Warrior"
- Rocky Custer - "The Summer"
- Spencer - "Doctor of Love"
- Spencer - "Hurricane"
- Tommy B. Waters - "Love Without You"

Levi Heron - The Glen
