= Feedback (Janet Jackson song) =

2007 single by Janet Jackson

Single by Janet Jackson

from the album Discipline
- Released: December 12, 2007
- Studio: 2nd Floor Studios (Atlantic City, NJ); SouthSide Studios (Atlanta, GA)
- Genre: Dance-pop; electropop
- Length: 3:57 (single version/radio edit); 3:38 (album version)
- Label: Island
- Songwriters: Rodney Jerkins; Dernst Emile; Tasleema Yasin; LaShawn Daniels
- Producers: Darkchild; D'Mile

Janet Jackson singles chronology
"With U" (2006)	"Feedback" (2007)	"Rock with U" (2008)

Music video
- "Feedback" on YouTube

"Feedback" is a song by American singer Janet Jackson from her 10th studio album, Discipline (2008). It was written and produced by Rodney "Darkchild" Jerkins and D'Mile, with additional writing from Tasleema Yasin and LaShawn Daniels. "Feedback" fuses electropop and dance, while also incorporating elements of Eurodance and hip hop. Its lyrical composition is based on Jackson's sexual bravado; questioning the listener while responding with a chant of "sexy, sexy". Its chorus compares her body to instruments such as a guitar and amplifier, using metaphors to demonstrate sexual climax.

Released as the lead single from Discipline on December 12, 2007, by Island Records, "Feedback" received acclaim from music critics, who praised its dance sound and contrast from Jackson's previous album 20 Y.O. (2006). It reached number 19 on the US Billboard Hot 100 and peaked atop the Dance Club Songs chart, becoming her highest-peaking single since "Someone to Call My Lover" (2001). Internationally, it reached the top ten in Canada, Greece, and Slovakia.

The song's accompanying music video, directed by Saam Farahmand, portrays Jackson jumping from various planets before dancing among an unidentified white liquid. The video received positive feedback from critics, who praised its galactic visuals and choreography. Jackson performed "Feedback" on Good Morning America, The Ellen DeGeneres Show, and TRL–the latter being Jackson's first appearance on MTV since her 2004 Super Bowl performance incident. "Feedback" received nominations for various awards, including three International Dance Music Awards.

== Music and lyrics ==
"Feedback" was written and produced by Rodney "Darkchild" Jerkins and D'Mile, with additional writing from Tasleema Yasin and LaShawn Daniels. It saw Jackson returning to an experimental dance-pop sound in contrast to the subdued rhythmic feel of prior album 20 Y.O. Island Records' A&R director Shakir Stewart likened its drum pattern to "Rhythm Nation", though he clarified: "it doesn't sound like it. It's a 2008 version." "Feedback" is an electropop and R&B song with slight elements of Eurodance and hip hop. It features varied instrumentation, such as guitars, synthesizers and drums. The song uses a "digitized" robotic effect on Jackson's vocals to heighten its futuristic aura and sensual tone, likened to a sex gynoid by Rolling Stone. Erotic Revolutionaries author Shayne Lee wrote: "In "Feedback", she puts her body on display for a peep show in which her partner is free to explore her erotic zones."

Feedback
Janet uses metaphors and questions the listener over the song's electro instrumentation.

The line within the song, "My swag is serious, something heavy like a first day period," in which Jackson compares her dominant presence to the initial side effects of a woman's menstrual cycle, drew media attention. Digital Spy remarked the song deserved heightened notoriety due to the lyrical boast, praising her return to "brilliantly filthy form". Louis Virtel of Movieline highlighted the line as he called "Feedback" Jackson's "biggest feat" in several years. In 2013, Thought Catalog declared Jackson among "23 Essential Role Models" for young women, saying despite the line, "somehow the song is still sexy and hot and amazing.[...] Her witchcraft is something to be studied for years to come."

== Release ==
Jackson's first single released by Island Records after departing from Virgin Records, "Feedback" leaked on December 12, 2007, and premiered via New York radio station Z100 the same day. It was made available for digital download on December 26, and was serviced to contemporary hit radio and rhythmic contemporary radio in the United States on January 8, 2008.

== Critical reception ==
Chuck Taylor of Billboard declared it a "bona fide smash," equipped with "the goods for a meaningful return to pop." Taylor noted the song "features a gracious dance groove, but more so, supplies a sing along hook and distinctive melody," likening it to "a funked-up 'All for You'". Glenn Gamboa of Newsweek called it "enjoyable fluff," with a "robo-dance" sound highlighting "Jackson's playful phrasing and ability to mine the electro-groove." Blender called it "her most distinctive track in years," and MTV News cited Jackson as "bringing back the dance sound" to the mainstream. Nick Levine of Digital Spy deemed it a "libidinous strut" that contains "everything you want from a Jackson single", including "hard-edged beats, plenty of hooks and enough attitude to compensate for her flimsy-as-cling-film voice." Levine went on to call the track "a Shoulda Been Smash, if only for Janet's boast that she's "something heavy like a first-day period." Keith Harris of Rolling Stone called the song a "high-voltage money shot," likening Jackson's vocals to a "sex droid," complete with "crass" beats and "heavy breathing." Harris added, "When Janet brags she's heavy like a first-day period [...] all the amateur competition should just pack up their Webcams and go home."

Entertainment Weekly's Tim Stack analyzed it as "breathy with a propulsive beat" and "exactly how I like my Jsquared," calling Jackson "the comeback story of 2008." Andy Battaglia of The A.V. Club considered it "a slight digital jam" which masks Jackson among "uncertain vocal tones and incongruous lines about guitars." IGN called Jackson's vocals a "metallic mess" but goes on to say that the song is saved by a "mediocre hook" and a "fuzzy dance beat." The New York Times referred to the track as "blippy and propulsive," stating that it offers "more proof that for Ms. Jackson, sex really doesn't sell." PopMatters called it "energetic" and a "club-ready track perfect for both Janet's celebrated choreography and flirty vocal stylings," adding "she opts to forgo any shock and awe moments," repeating the lines, "sexy, sexy, sexy" to grab your interests, versus a full onslaught of visceral come on's." The Boston Globe called it "droid-like," built on "metaphors and analogies."

Eric Henderson of Slant Magazine said the track "shows Janet the 4/4 we assumed she lost, though the beat whomps so relentlessly here it's hard to know how she could've ever misplaced it." The song's "octane," composition, and bridge were also praised, with Henderson adding she's "accidentally discovered the essence of hip-hop for good measure." Slant Magazine ranked it the eighth best single of 2008 and 59th best song of the decade, declaring it "infectiously bizarre" and commending its advanced production and lyrical content. NRJ France commended its "sexy chorus" and "fat electro bass", saying it "remains easily in your head." The Los Angeles Times noted its "top-notch" and "glossed-over" production, praising the "tech-savvy groove" while adding "It'll sound great in a club." Australia's Daily Telegraph called it a "cracking pop track." Elsewhere, it was called "crisp", "danceable", and "ridiculously good", also "lavished with Janet's trademark velvet harmonies." MuuMuse ranked it the nineteenth best single of the year, while MuchMusic praised the single as a return to form, saying "People want to dance. You like to dance. Together, the world can dance once again." Bob Burke of FMQB described the song as "a whole new groove for Jackson" that "fits like a glove," adding "the early 'feedback' indicates another multi-format hit in the making."

== Commercial performance ==
"Feedback" debuted on the US Billboard Hot 100 at number 84. Several weeks later, it rose to its peak position at number 19, becoming Jackson's 29th top-20 single on the chart and her first since "Someone to Call My Lover" (2001). On other US Billboard charts, "Feedback" reached number one on the Dance Club Songs chart, number two on Hot Singles Sales, number three on Dance/Mix Show Airplay, number seven on Digital Song Sales, number 30 on Mainstream Top 40, and number 23 on the Pop 100. It also peaked within the top 25 of rhythmic and urban airplay formats. It was the fifth most successful song on Dance Club Songs of 2008, as well as Jackson's 18th number-one on the chart. In Canada, "Feedback" peaked at number three on the Canadian Hot 100 and number two on Hot Canadian Digital Singles.

Internationally, "Feedback" reached number five in Greece, as well as number eight in Slovakia, where it charted for 41 weeks. In Japan, it peaked at number 14 on the Japan Hot 100 and at number seven on the Japan Hot 100 airplay chart. It peaked within the top 20 in Norway and New Zealand, while reaching number 21 in Finland, number 22 in Brazil, number 32 in Ireland, and the top 40 in France, Denmark, and Germany. In Australia and the United Kingdom, it was not as successful, peaking at numbers 50 and 114, respectively; however, it did manage to peak at 14 on the UK R&B Chart. The song was the 33rd most-played song of 2008 on Lebanese NRJ radio.

== Music video ==
=== Background and concept ===
The music video for "Feedback," directed by Saam Farahmand, was filmed over two days on December 13–14, 2007, on a sound-stage located in New York City. Jackson approached Farahmand with a "futuristic" galactic concept, which he created based on Jackson's vision. Jackson was the first pop artist to work with Farahmand, resulting in a "far more" successful attempt at mainstream recognition than his prior works. A second version of the video, with several scenes lightened and edited to appear more clearly, was released to iTunes two months after the original. Rolling Stone later announced it the third most expensive music video of 2008.

=== Synopsis ===
Jackson portrays an intergalactic being in an alternate universe, commanding white objects to ascend from a liquid surface.

The music video begins with a purple liquid forming the word 'JANET'. Jackson is then shown sitting on top of a planet in outer space, wearing a bodysuit adorned with jewelry, long ponytail, and mask. Various asteroids and dancers mounting planets in black latex attire and helmets are shown. Jackson flips her ponytail, revealing her face as cosmic dust is tossed about. Several dancers leap to other planets as Jackson descends to a cratered surface, performing abstract choreography with two dancers. Jackson jumps to another setting, shown in slow motion as the audio is filtered, landing on a white liquid surface with a crimson atmosphere. Backed by eight dancers, Jackson performs the song's choreography as various objects crash into the liquid. Jackson and the dancers fall into the liquid, with Jackson reemerging in a red catsuit. Jackson then performs a dance routine with six glowing spheres. The final sphere ascends upward as fourteen white liquid objects explode.

=== Release and reception ===
The video premiered on January 8, 2008, on BET's 106 & Park at first (at 6PM ET) and debuted later on Yahoo! Music (at 7:30PM ET). Upon mending her relationship with MTV, it premiered on TRL on January 14, 2008. The video and behind the scenes footage is featured on a DVD included with the deluxe edition of Jackson's Discipline album.

Yahoo! Music declared "Feedback" the tenth most streamed video of 2008. Billboard favorably called it "pretty insane". MTV News regarded Jackson as being "big-time back," citing the clip as an "indication of her new look and feel." MTV added, "Janet looks amazing, and the track bumps," regarding it "hot enough to undo the damage of Nipplegate, of course, but, more recently, 20 Y.O." MuchMusic declared it "awesome", adding "the dance sequence is classic Jackson fabulousness and the ending is super cool." the Los Angeles Times praised the science fiction aura among its "planetary effects". NRJ France praised its "magnificent" choreography, adding that the video closes with "a squirt of milk." Eric Henderson of Slant Magazine thought it was "a minor revelation" in comparison to the song itself, though credited Jackson for "juggling CGI in a skin-tight red jumpsuit during what appeared to be the middle ground of her yo-yo weight swings" and "whipping up cosmic dust with that ponytail (how's that for an entrance?!)."

== Live performances ==
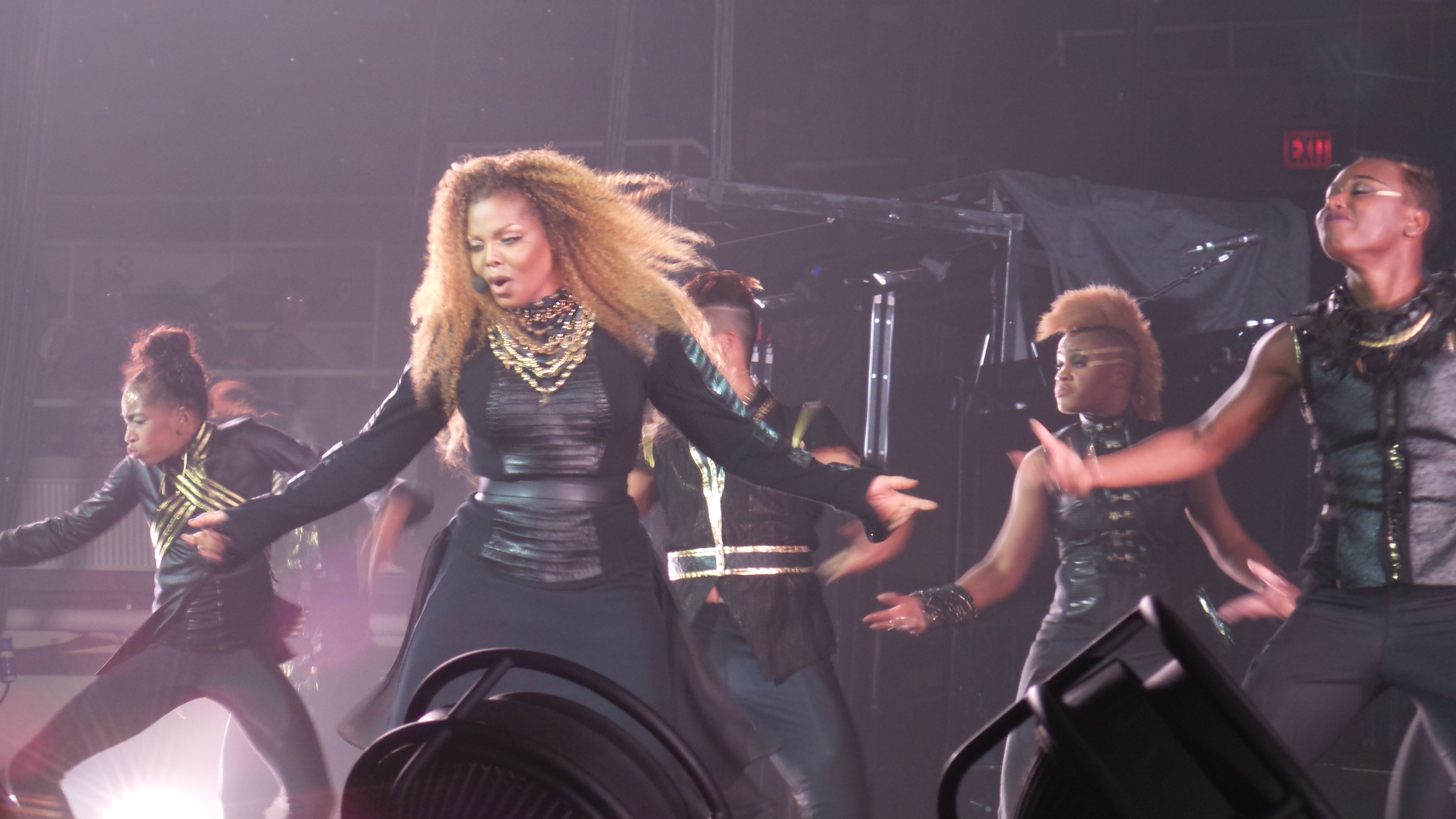
Jackson and her dancers performing "Feedback" during her Unbreakable Tour (2015–16).

Jackson performed "Feedback" on Good Morning America, The Ellen DeGeneres Show, and MTV's TRL. "Feedback" and several other songs were scheduled to be performed on Saturday Night Live, but Jackson was required to cancel due to illness. Performances on Jimmy Kimmel Live and London nightclub G-A-Y were also initially planned. Jackson taught the video's choreography to Larry King during an appearance on Larry King Live. It was later performed on the Rock Witchu Tour, Number Ones, Up Close and Personal, Unbreakable World Tour, and the 2017–2019 State of the World Tour. The performance on TRL became Jackson's first appearance on MTV in six years, following a lengthy period in which the network blacklisted Jackson and her music videos after they were fined regarding her controversial Super Bowl performance incident. MTV News called the performance "fantastique", with the audience "completely losing their cot-damn marbles." Jackson's rendition on Number Ones, Up Close and Personal was called "throbbing" by The Courant, noting its "explicit dance moves". Jackson also included the song on her 2019 Las Vegas Residency Janet Jackson: Metamorphosis.

Musician Justin West recorded an acoustic version of "Feedback." Miley Cyrus performed a dance routine to the song on the premiere episode of YouTube series "The Miley and Mandy Show". So You Think You Dance winner Jeanine Mason performed a dance routine to the song on the show's fifth season. It was also used in an episode of MTV's The Hills. In 2013, it was mentioned in the novel Cruising: Gay Erotic Stories. Fitness magazine included it among their list of Best Songs for Running.

== Awards and accolades ==
Award	Nominated work	Result
HX Awards	Best Dance Single of the Year	Nominated
International Dance Music Awards	Best Pop Dance Track	Nominated
International Dance Music Awards	Best House/Garage Track	Nominated
International Dance Music Awards	Best Urban Dance Track	Nominated
Slant Magazine	The 25 Best Singles of 2008 — #7	—N/a
Slant Magazine	The 100 Best Singles of the Aughts — #59	—N/a
Yahoo! Music	Top 10 Streaming Videos of 2008 — #10	—N/a

== Track listings ==
- UK 12-inch vinyl (1764113) (limited edition picture disc)
1. Main version – 3:38
2. Instrumental – 3:57
3. Ralphi Rosario Electroshok Radio Mix – 3:44
- Australian, French CD single (1763603)
1. Single version – 3:56
2. Ralphi Rosario Electroshok Radio Mix – 3:44
- German CD maxi
1. Main – 3:59
2. Ralphi Rosario Electroshok Radio Mix – 3:44
3. Ralphi Rosario Electroshok Club Mix – 8:10
4. Video – 4:08
- Digital EP – Remixes
1. Moto Blanco Full Vocal Remix – 8:26
2. Ralphi Rosario Dirty Club Remix – 9:40
3. Ralphi Rosario Electroshock Club – 8:10
4. Wideboys Club Remix – 6:19
5. Jody den Broeder Club Remix – 7:16
- Digital Download – So So Def Remix (Explicit)
1. So So Def Remix (featuring Busta Rhymes, Ciara and Fabolous) (Explicit) – 3:31
- Digital Download – So So Def Remix (Edited)
1. So So Def Remix (featuring Busta Rhymes, Ciara and Fabolous) (Edited) – 3:31
- French DVD-Video
1. Music video – 4:19

== Personnel ==
- Vocals: Janet Jackson
- Writers: Rodney Jerkins, D'Mile, Tasleema Yasin, LaShawn Daniels
- Producers: Rodney "Darkchild" Jerkins, D'Mile
- Mixing: Roberto "Tito" Vazquez, Rodney Jerkins
- Engineer: Josh Houghkirk, Carlos Oyanedel
- Pro Tools editing: Mike "Handz" Donaldson

== Charts ==
=== Weekly charts ===
Weekly chart performance for "Feedback"
Chart (2008)	Peak position
Australia (ARIA)	50
Australian Urban (ARIA)	14
Austria (Ö3 Austria Top 40)	47
Belgium (Ultratop 50 Flanders)	19
Belgium (Ultratip Bubbling Under Wallonia)	5
Canada Hot 100 (Billboard)	3
CIS Airplay (TopHit)	117
Croatia International Airplay (HRT)	13
Denmark (Tracklisten)	27
Finland (Suomen virallinen lista)	21
France (SNEP)	36
Germany (GfK)	40
Global Dance Tracks (Billboard)	5
Ireland (IRMA)	32
Japan (Japan Hot 100)	14
Japan (Oricon)	200
Netherlands (Dutch Top 40 Tipparade)	14
Netherlands (Single Top 100)	59
New Zealand (Recorded Music NZ)	17
Norway (VG-lista)	16
Romania (Romanian Top 100)	34
Slovakia Airplay (ČNS IFPI)	8
Sweden (Sverigetopplistan)	41
Switzerland (Schweizer Hitparade)	51
UK Singles (OCC)	114
UK Hip Hop/R&B (Official Charts)	14
US Billboard Hot 100	19
US Dance Club Songs (Billboard)	1
US Hot R&B/Hip-Hop Songs (Billboard)	39
US Pop Airplay (Billboard)	30
US Rhythmic Airplay (Billboard)	26

=== Year-end charts ===
Year-end chart performance for "Feedback"
Chart (2008)	Position
Canada (Canadian Hot 100)	68
Japan (Japan Hot 100)	98
UK Commercial Pop Top 30 (Music Week)	3
US Dance Club Songs (Billboard)	5

== Certifications ==
Region	Certification	Certified units/sales
United States (RIAA)	Platinum	1,000,000^{‡}
^{‡} Sales+streaming figures based on certification alone.

== Release history ==
Release dates and formats for "Feedback"
Region	Date	Version(s)	Format(s)	Label(s)	Ref.
United States	December 12, 2007	Original	Streaming	Island	
United States	December 26, 2007	Original	Digital download	Island	
United States	January 8, 2008	Original	Contemporary hit radio; rhythmic contemporary radio	Island	
Japan	February 6, 2008	Original	CD	Universal Music	
United States	February 12, 2008	Various	12-inch vinyl; digital download (EP)	Island	
Australia	February 18, 2008	Original	CD	Universal Music	
United Kingdom	March 3, 2008	Original	CD	Mercury	
Germany	March 21, 2008	Various	Maxi CD	Universal Music	
United States	April 15, 2008	So So Def Remix	Digital download	Island	

== Bibliography ==
- Lee, Shayne (August 4, 2010). Erotic Revolutionaries: Black Women, Sexuality, and Popular Culture. Government Institutes. p. 15. ISBN 9780761852292 – via Google Books.
