= Tonight (Ken Laszlo song) =

1985 single by Ken Laszlo

Single by Ken Laszlo

from the album Ken Laszlo
- B-side: "Tonight (Instrumental)"
- Released: 1985
- Recorded: September 1985
- Studio: Memory (Parma)
- Genre: Italo disco
- Length: 3:59
- Label: Memory
- Songwriter(s): Sandro Oliva; Gino Caria
- Producer(s): Stefano Cundari; Alessandro Zanni

Ken Laszlo singles chronology
"Hey Hey Guy" (1984)	"Tonight" (1985)	"Don't Cry" (1986)

Audio
- "Tonight" on YouTube

"Tonight" is a song by Italian musician Ken Laszlo (real name Gianni Coraini), released in 1985 as the second single from his debut studio album, Ken Laszlo (1987). The song reached the top 10 in Sweden, peaking at No. 7 in March 1986. "Tonight" also charted in the Netherlands, Belgium and France, peaking at No. 24, No. 26 and No. 29, respectively.

== Track listing and formats ==
- Italian 7-inch single

A. "Tonight" – 3:59
B. "Tonight" (Instrumental) – 3:48

- Italian 12-inch single

A. "Tonight" – 5:45
B. "Tonight" (Instrumental) – 5:45

== Credits and personnel ==
- Ken Laszlo – vocals
- Sandro Oliva – songwriter, arranger
- Gino Caria – songwriter, arranger
- Stefano Cundari – producer, arranger, mixing
- Alessandro Zanni – producer, arranger
- Claudio Cattafesta – producer, arranger, mixing
- Emilio Tremolada – cover art, photographer

Credits and personnel adapted from the Ken Laszlo album and 7-inch single liner notes.

== Charts ==
Weekly chart performance for "Tonight"
Chart (1985–1986)	Peak position
Belgium (Ultratop 50 Wallonia)	26
France (SNEP)	29
Netherlands (Dutch Top 40)	14
Netherlands (Single Top 100)	24
Sweden (Sverigetopplistan)	7
