= Khia discography =

- Studio albums: 7
- Singles: 10
- Video albums: 5

This is the discography of American rapper Khia.

== Studio albums ==
Title	Album details	Peak chart positions		Certifications
Title	Album details	US	US R&B /HH	Certifications
Thug Misses	Released: April 23, 2002; Label: Epic; Formats: CD, digital download	33	13	RIAA: Gold
Gangstress	Released: July 11, 2006; Label: Path Thru; Formats: CD, digital download	—	67	
Nasti Muzik	Released: July 22, 2008; Label: Big Cat; Formats: CD, digital download	—	66	
MotorMouf aka Khia Shamone	Released: July 12, 2012; Label: Thug Misses Entertainment; Format: Digital download	—	—	
Love Locs	Released: July 4, 2014; Label: Thug Misses Entertainment; Format: Digital download	—	—	
QueenDomCum	Released: July 7, 2016; Label: Thug Misses Entertainment; Format: Digital download	—	—	
Twerkanomics	Released: December 6, 2018; Label: Thug Misses Entertainment; Format: Digital download	—	—	
"—" denotes items which were not released in that country or failed to chart.

== Mixtapes ==
List of mixtapes, with selected details
Title	Details
All Hail the Queen	Released: September 13, 2006
The Boss Lady (with DJ Scream)	Released: May 11, 2008
Street Respect (with DJ Keem Dawg)	Released: 2008

== Singles ==
=== As lead artist ===
Title	Year	Peak chart positions									Certifications	Album
Title	Year	US	US R&B /HH	US Rap	AUS	CAN	GER	IRE	NLD	UK	Certifications	Album
"My Neck, My Back (Lick It)"	2002	42	20	12	12	30	29	20	28	4	ARIA: Gold; BPI: Silver	Thug Misses
"You My Girl"	2002	—	—	—	—	—	—	—	—	—		Thug Misses
"The K-Wang"	2002	—	—	—	—	—	—	—	—	—		Thug Misses
"Snatch the Cat Back"	2006	—	—	—	—	—	—	—	—	—		Gangstress
"What They Do" (featuring Gucci Mane)	2008	—	—	—	—	—	—	—	—	—		Nasti Muzik
"Be Your Lady"	2008	—	—	—	—	—	—	—	—	—		Nasti Muzik
"Been a Bad Girl"	2010	—	—	—	—	—	—	—	—	—		Motor Mouf a.k.a. Khia Shamone
"You Deserve It"	2014	—	—	—	—	—	—	—	—	—		Love Locs
"Yum Yum Sauce"	2015	—	—	—	—	—	—	—	—	—		QueenDom Cum
"Next Caller" (featuring Ts Madison)	2017	—	—	—	—	—	—	—	—	—		TwerkAnomics
"Petty"	2017	—	—	—	—	—	—	—	—	—		TwerkAnomics
"Kash Only"	2018	—	—	—	—	—	—	—	—	—		TwerkAnomics
"—" denotes items which were not released in that country or failed to chart.

=== As a featured artist ===
Title	Year	Chart positions						Album
Title	Year	US	US R&B /HH	CIS	FIN	ITA	SPA	Album
"So Excited" (Janet Jackson featuring Khia and Jermaine Dupri)	2006	90	18	58	9	37	13	20 Y.O.

=== Promotional singles ===
- "Psychic Eyes" (2013)
- "I'm Hott" (2014)
- "My X" (2014)
- "Lazer Pop" (featuring Kuntilla) (2014)

== Album appearances ==
Year	Title	Album
2002	"My Neck, My Back"	Dark Angel soundtrack
2002	"Play Wit It" (Dirty South Divas featuring Khia)	Play Wit It
2004	"J.O.D.D." (Trick Daddy featuring Khia)	Thug Matrimony: Married to the Streets
2005	"Badesong" (DJ Tomekk featuring Khia and Sido)	Numma Eyns
2005	"Imm Club" (DJ Tomekk featuring Khia, G-Style, Mega D and Pain)	Numma Eyns
2005	"Work" (JT Money featuring Khia)	Undeniable
2007	"What They Do" (Gucci Man featuring Khia and Young Snead)	Trap-a-Thon
2015	"In You Mouf" (JT Money featuring Khia)	P.G.P. (Pimpin' Gangsta Party)

== Music videos ==
Year	Title	Director
2002	"My Neck, My Back (Lick It)"	Diane Martel
2002	"You My Girl"	Dave Meyers
2006	"So Excited" (Janet Jackson featuring Khia)	Joseph Kahn
2006	"Snatch the Cat Back"	Unknown
2008	"Be Your Lady"	Christopher Nolan
2010	"Been a Bad Girl"	Clifton Bell
2013	"Turn U Out"	Unknown
2014	"You Deserve It"	Khia
2016	"Yum Yum Sauce"	Khia
2017	"Next Caller"	Khia
2022	"KWANG WIT IT"	Rahn Evans
