= Let's Wait Awhile =

1987 single by Janet Jackson

Single by Janet Jackson

from the album Control
- B-side: "Pretty Boy"; "Nasty" (Cool Summer Mixes)
- Released: January 6, 1987
- Recorded: 1985
- Studio: Flyte Tyme, Minneapolis, Minnesota
- Genre: Pop; R&B
- Length: 4:37
- Label: A&M
- Songwriters: James Harris III; Terry Lewis; Janet Jackson; Melanie Andrews
- Producer: Jimmy Jam and Terry Lewis

Janet Jackson singles chronology
"Control" (1986)	"Let's Wait Awhile" (1987)	"Diamonds" (1987)

Music video
- "Let's Wait Awhile" on YouTube

"Let's Wait Awhile" is a song by American singer Janet Jackson from her third studio album Control (1986). It was released on January 6, 1987 on A&M Records as the album's fifth single. The song was written and produced by Jackson, Jimmy Jam, and Terry Lewis, with Melanie Andrews serving as co-writer. It is also the first song Jackson co-produced. "Let's Wait Awhile" was inspired by intimate moments and conversations Andrews had with her first love and boyfriend. Just young teenagers at the time, the couple decided through those conversations to postpone sexual intimacy within their relationship until the time was right.

The song received generally favorable reviews from music critics, who praised the track's sweetness and Jackson's tender delivery. It was also praised for its meaningful message, considered to be a teaching tool to encourage sexual abstinence amidst the AIDS crisis at the time. In the United States, "Let's Wait Awhile" peaked at number two on the Billboard Hot 100 and Adult Contemporary charts, while topping the Hot R&B/Hip-Hop Songs chart. Internationally, it reached number three in the United Kingdom, where she made her debut on the BBC's Top of the Pops on March 26, 1987, and number four in Ireland, in addition to charting within the top 40 in several other countries. It has been included on two of Jackson's greatest hits albums, Design of a Decade: 1986–1996 (1995) and Number Ones (2009).

A music video for "Let's Wait Awhile," directed by Dominic Sena, co-stars martial artist and actor Taimak, and tells the story of a couple in love. Jackson has performed the song live on all of her tours, beginning with the Rhythm Nation World Tour 1990 through the Unbreakable World Tour (2015–16), receiving praise for her vocal performance. The song has been covered and sampled in numerous songs throughout the years.

== Background and recording ==
While writing for her upcoming breakthrough album Control, Jackson's manager John McClain introduced to her the production duo Jimmy Jam and Terry Lewis to work and produce with her the majority of the album. "Let's Wait Awhile" was one of the tracks they penned together, along with Melanie Andrews. Jackson, Jam and Lewis also produced the track and provided rhythm arrangements, while the latter two with Andrews were responsible for vocal arrangements. Jackson alone provided digital bells and background vocals, while Jam and Lewis were responsible for drum programming, digital keyboards, acoustic piano, and percussion. It was recorded and mixed at Flyte Tyme Productions in Minneapolis, Minnesota.

== Composition and lyrical interpretation ==
"Let's Wait Awhile" is a simple love song, as described by Jam and Lewis. Lyrically, it talks about abstinence and waiting until the right moment to have sex. Janet, along with her friend and co-writer Melanie Andrews, was inspired to write the track after talking about how Melanie was unsure if she really wanted to have sex with her boyfriend. She advised her to wait awhile, and after that discussion she was inspired to write the track. "I connected that song to millions of young people who might need encouragement to think rather than act, to pause rather than move." Jam further commented, "The theme of the song was Janet's idea. She's not a preachy person. She's not telling people how to live their lives. All she's doing is offering an opinion."

In addition to serving as an anthem for sexual abstinence, the song became successful during the height of the AIDS pandemic. Some school teachers adopted the song as a teaching tool to help steer students toward sexual abstinence. It was also a precursor to a sexually liberated Jackson who emerged on the Rhythm Nation 1814 track "Someday Is Tonight", a sequel to "Let's Wait Awhile", which can be viewed as Jackson's readiness to go further in their relationship. On her album Janet, several songs revolve around the theme of sexual intimacy as well. On 20 Y.O., the track "With U" was written as a follow-up to "Let's Wait Awhile". According to the song's producer Jermaine Dupri, "With U" takes place after the act of intimacy the two have put off, which results in "romantic confusion".

"Let's Wait Awhile" is written in the key of C♯ major, set in a rock ballad tempo of 87 beats per minute. Janet's vocals range from the low note of G♯_{3} to the high note of C♯_{5}. The introduction follows the chord progression of F♯–D♯7–C♯/D♯–E7–D/E–E7–G♯, while the verses follow the chord progression of F7–D♯7–F7–D♯7–F7. The key of the song moves up one semitone to D major at the last chorus of the song.

== Critical reception ==
"Let's Wait Awhile" received mostly positive reviews from music critics. Ed Hogan of AllMusic saw the song as a "sweet, soft departure from the hard funky veneer of [previous singles] 'What Have You Done for Me Lately,' 'Nasty,' and 'Control.'" Eric Henderson of Slant Magazine praised "how perfect her tremulous hesitance fits into the abstinence anthem 'Let's Wait Awhile'," also noting that it "would've been a great place to end the album." Norman Riley of The Crisis praised the track, calling it "pleasing and surprising." Nelson George of Billboard picked the track as one of the album's highlights, calling it "somber." Danyel Smith of Vibe praised the track, writing that "on the fragile [ballad], Jackson's tender, hesitant delivery conveys all of the trepidation and wonder felt by a young girl on the brink of losing her innocence." Wendy Robinson of PopMatters praised the track for "showcas[ing] Janet's ability to combine a gorgeous melody with a meaningful message." Nick Levine wrote for Digital Spy that the "seemingly gooey '80s ballad has a hard centre," referring to the song's lyrics.

== Controversy ==
"Let's Wait Awhile" has been described as "bearing striking similarities" to the 1975 song "Daisy Jane" by the band America. Reportedly on hearing "Let's Wait Awhile" on a car radio in 1987, the road manager for America pulled over at a phone booth to alert Gerry Beckley to the evident debt of Jackson's track to Beckley's composition. Beckley eventually reached an out-of-court settlement with Jackson and her co-writers Jimmy Jam and Terry Lewis, thus preempting litigation for plagiarism.

== Commercial performance ==
In the United States, "Let's Wait Awhile" peaked at number two on the Billboard Hot 100, behind Club Nouveau's "Lean on Me." It became Jackson's fifth consecutive top-five single on the chart. It also reached number one on the Hot R&B/Hip-Hop Songs chart for one week, her fourth single to top the chart. "Let's Wait Awhile" was placed at number 48 on the Billboard Hot 100 year-end chart of 1987 and at number 42 on the year's R&B chart. The single also peaked at number two on the Hot Adult Contemporary chart. In the United Kingdom, the song was released in March 1987 and peaked at number three on the UK Singles Chart a month later, spending 10 weeks on the chart. It became her second top-three single there, and her most successful at the time, along with "What Have You Done for Me Lately." The single also peaked inside the top 20 in Belgium, Canada, Ireland, and the Netherlands.

== Music video ==
The music video for "Let's Wait Awhile" was directed by Dominic Sena and is set in New York City. Martial artist and actor Taimak Guarriello was cast to play Jackson's love interest after receiving a call from a modeling agent, who informed him that Jackson wanted him to portray her boyfriend. The video follows Jackson and her boyfriend going out for a romantic night on the town. In the middle of the video, her boyfriend wants to end the evening by taking their relationship a step further, but Jackson wants to wait until they are both ready.

== Live performances ==
Jackson has performed the song on most of her tours. It was performed on the 1990 Rhythm Nation 1814 Tour. Jackson included "Let's Wait Awhile" during her Janet World Tour in 1993–95. During some shows, the singer asked a prayer to her brother Michael Jackson. According to Greg Kot of The Chicago Tribune, she sang it "as if to say she's still the one in charge" following her female-empowering themes throughout her career. During The Velvet Rope Tour in 1998, she sang the song sitting on a stool, accompanied by a guitarist. A medley at the October 11, 1998 show at Madison Square Garden in New York City was broadcast during a special titled The Velvet Rope: Live in Madison Square Garden by HBO. It was also added to the set list of its DVD release, The Velvet Rope Tour: Live in Concert (1999).

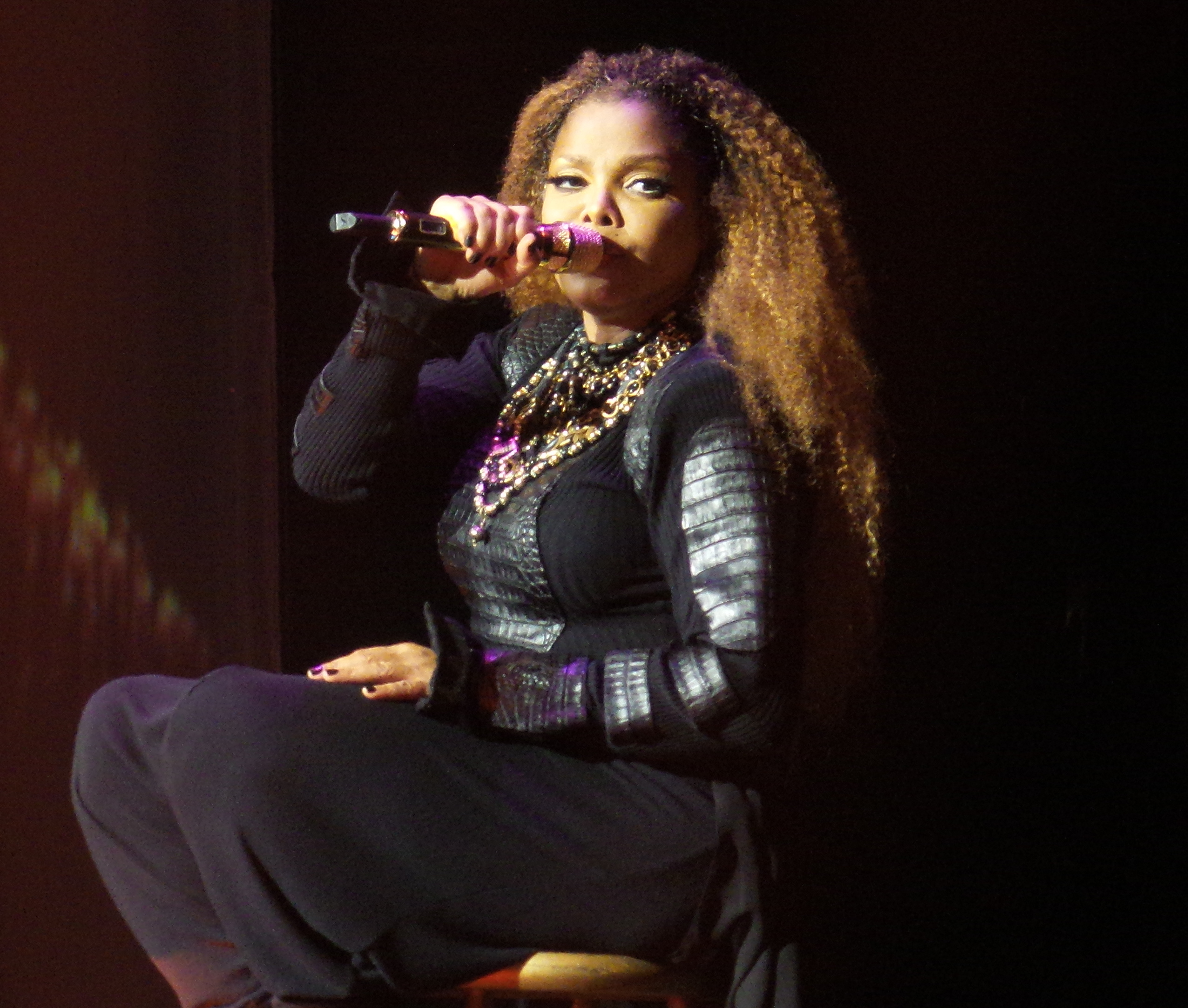
Jackson performing the song during her 2015-16 Unbreakable World Tour.

For the performance of "Let's Wait Awhile" on the All for You Tour in 2001 and 2002, Denise Sheppard from Rolling Stone called the number "mellow," and commented, "Without question, one of the night's most beautiful and verklempt moments arrived out of nowhere forty-five minutes into the set. It was the first time that a break in the action occurred—no dancers, no music—and as a close-up captured Jackson looking genuinely happy, the audience spontaneously burst into what became a five-minute standing ovation. Looking on, shocked by the sincerity of the moment, she shed sincere tears, simultaneously overwhelmed and overjoyed. 'I love you so much, Vancouver. Thank you.'" The February 16, 2002 final date of the tour at Aloha Stadium in Hawaii was broadcast by HBO, and included a performance of the song. This rendition was also added to the set list at its DVD release, Janet: Live in Hawaii, in 2002.

For The Rock Witchu Tour in 2008, she included "Let's Wait Awhile" in its set list. Phil Gallo of Variety praised her vocals during the performance of the song, praising her "startlingly full-bodied" vocal performance on the track. In contrast, Marsha Lederman of The Globe and Mail perceived that the performance was "a bit bumpy, and she seemed to be struggling a tad as she held her hand up to her ear in an effort to catch the right notes." On the Number Ones: Up Close and Personal tour, Jackson used a diamond-encrusted lavender gown to perform a ballad medley of "Nothing," "Come Back to Me," and "Let's Wait Awhile." Annabel Ross of Sydney's "Everguide" praised Janet for "hitting some impressive high notes herself." Joanna Chaundy of The Independent agreed, calling it "the highlight of the show's first half since her voice was more audible and still in fine form." The song was also included in Jackson's 2015-2016 Unbreakable World Tour; writing for the Hartford Courant, Thomas Kintner pointed out that the performance showcased "that even though singing is not the most evocative part of her repertoire, it generates smallish vocal flourishes to augment her pleasant baseline tone." It was included as a video interlude on the second leg of the State of the World Tour. Jackson included the song at her 2019 Las Vegas residence Janet Jackson: Metamorphosis. It was also included on her special concert series Janet Jackson: A Special 30th Anniversary Celebration of Rhythm Nation in 2019.

== Legacy ==
In 1987, the song was part of the international soundtrack of Brazilian telenovela "Brega e Chique" (English: "Tacky and Chic"). In 1988, smooth jazz/fusion guitarist Paul Jackson Jr. covered the song for his album I Came to Play. In 1989, jazz fusion saxophonist Nelson Rangell covered the song on his album Playing for Keeps. In 1990, Hong Kong singer Cass Phang covered the song for her album With Love. In 1992, contemporary jazz musician Everette Harp covered the song on his self-titled debut album. In 1994, Booker T. & The M.G.s covered the song instrumentally on their album That's the Way It Should Be. In 2001, Ashanti covered the chorus on the Big Pun album Endangered Species. During that same year, Destiny's Child sang the song live as a tribute to Jackson during MTV's MTV Icon special. In 2002, smooth jazz guitarist Norman Brown covered the song instrumentally on his album Just Chillin'. In 2004, Australian actress Emily Browning covered this song. In 2005, Ilona Irvine covered the song on the compilation album Island Soul: A Way of Life, Vol. 1. In 2007, Filipino singer Nikki Gil covered the song. Its refrain is sampled by Melody Thornton on Jibbs' single "Go Too Far." In 2013, Justin Timberlake sang part of "Let's Wait Awhile" on his The 20/20 Experience World Tour. In 2014, Amber Riley and Kevin McHale covered the song in the Glee episode "Tested."

== Track listings ==
- US 7-inch single

A. "Let's Wait Awhile" (remix) – 4:30
B. "Pretty Boy" – 6:32

- UK and European 7-inch single

A. "Let's Wait Awhile" (remix) – 4:30
B. "Nasty" (Cool Summer Mix Part 1 edit) – 4:10

- UK 12-inch single

A1. "Let's Wait Awhile" (remix) – 4:30
A2. "Nasty" (Cool Summer Mix Part 1) – 7:57
B1. "Nasty" (Cool Summer Mix Part 2) – 10:09

- UK limited-edition 7-inch picture disc

A. "Let's Wait Awhile" (remix) – 4:30
B. "Nasty" (Cool Summer Mix Part 1 edit) – 4:10
C. "Nasty" (edit of remix) – 3:40
D. "Control" (edit) – 3:26

== Charts ==
=== Weekly charts ===
Chart (1987)	Peak position
Australia (Kent Music Report)	21
Belgium (Ultratop 50 Flanders)	15
Canada Top Singles (RPM)	11
Canada Adult Contemporary (RPM)	1
Canada Retail Singles (The Record)	14
Europe (European Hot 100 Singles)	11
Iceland (RÚV)	13
Ireland (IRMA)	4
Luxembourg (Radio Luxembourg)	4
Netherlands (Dutch Top 40)	16
Netherlands (Single Top 100)	14
New Zealand (Recorded Music NZ)	26
Panama (UPI)	6
Switzerland (Schweizer Hitparade)	27
UK Singles (Official Charts)	3
US Billboard Hot 100	2
US Adult Contemporary (Billboard)	2
US Hot R&B/Hip-Hop Songs (Billboard)	1
US Cash Box Top 100	3
West Germany (GfK)	34

=== Year-end charts ===
Chart (1987)	Position
Canada Top Singles (RPM)	73
Netherlands (Single Top 100)	72
UK Singles (Gallup)	37
US Billboard Hot 100	48
US Adult Contemporary (Billboard)	36
US Hot R&B/Hip-Hop Songs (Billboard)	42
US Cash Box Top 100	35

== Certifications ==
Region	Certification	Certified units/sales
United Kingdom (BPI)	Silver	250,000^{^}
^{^} Shipments figures based on certification alone.

== Release history ==
Release dates and formats for "Let's Wait Awhile"
Region	Date	Label(s)	Format(s)	Cat. No.	Ref.
United Kingdom	March 9, 1987	Breakout; A&M	7-inch; 12-inch	USA 601; USA 601T	
