= 20 Y.O. =

- Physical deluxe edition and digital cover

Studio album by Janet Jackson
- Released: September 20, 2006
- Recorded: 2005–2006
- Studios: Flyte Time; Studio Atlantis; The Village (Los Angeles)
- Genres: R&B; dance; hip-hop
- Length: 49:54
- Label: Virgin
- Producers: Janet Jackson; Jermaine Dupri; Jimmy Jam and Terry Lewis; LRoc; Manuel Seal; The Avila Brothers; No I.D.

Janet Jackson chronology
Damita Jo (2004)	20 Y.O. (2006)	Discipline (2008)

Singles from 20 Y.O.
- 1. "Call on Me" Released: June 19, 2006; 2. "So Excited" Released: August 28, 2006; 3. "With U" Released: December 11, 2006

20 Y.O. is the ninth studio album by American singer Janet Jackson. It was first released in Japan on September 20, 2006, by Virgin Records. Its title is a reference to the twentieth anniversary of the 1986 breakthrough album Control, which she made when she was 20, and that she felt 20 in 2006 as she was making 20 Y.O.. The album represents the "celebration of the joyful liberation and history-making musical style" of Control. It is an R&B and dance album. Jackson enlisted a range of producers with whom to work on its material, including LRoc, Manuel Seal, The Avila Brothers, and No I.D., in addition to her longtime partners Jimmy Jam and Terry Lewis and then-boyfriend Jermaine Dupri.

20 Y.O. received mixed reviews from music critics, with some of them questioning the involvement of Dupri. The album debuted at number two on the US Billboard 200, making it Jackson's eighth consecutive top-three entry and second consecutive number-two album debut on the chart. The Recording Industry Association of America (RIAA) certified it platinum, becoming Jackson's eighth consecutive platinum album. Worldwide, the album has sold 1.5 million copies. 20 Y.O. earned a Grammy Award nomination for Best Contemporary R&B Album in 2007.

To promote 20 Y.O., the singer appeared in various magazines, and performed on Today and the 2006 Billboard Music Awards. To further promote the release online, Jackson launched the "Design Me" cover contest, giving fans an opportunity to create the artwork for the album by downloading images of her and creating proposed covers for the album. Jackson hand-picked dozens of images to be used in the contest and selected her top four favorites, which were used for the standard edition's cover on American pressings of 20 Y.O.. Three singles were released from the album–"Call on Me", "So Excited", and "With U".

== Background and development ==
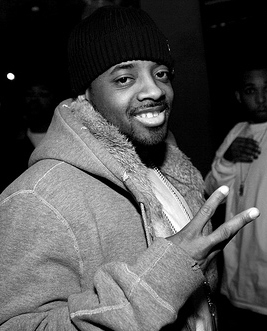
Jermaine Dupri (pictured) was commissioned to be the executive producer of 20 Y.O. in late 2004.

In 2004, Jackson performed at the Super Bowl XXXVIII halftime show with guest artist Justin Timberlake, who accidentally exposed her right breast at the end of their performance. A month later, she released her eighth studio album, Damita Jo. The album debuted at number two on Billboard 200, was certified Platinum by the Recording Industry Association of America (RIAA), and sold over three million copies worldwide. However, its singles received minimal airplay due to a blacklist of Jackson's music and videos on many music channels and radio formats caused by legalities surrounding the incident. At the end of 2004, Jackson announced that she intended to start work on a new album project in the coming year. It would involve her then boyfriend—record producer Jermaine Dupri, who was commissioned to executive produce the project—in addition to a roster of other producers. Dupri said at the time,

"For this record, it's gonna be all dance, though. It's gonna be straight 'Control', 'Nasty', hard-ass beats, memorable melodies. It's directed to her fans, people who miss dancing, people who miss seeing videos with dancing. These [younger artists] are sloppy, they don't take it as serious as she do. They don't rehearse for the hours she do. It's serious business for her and her family and her brothers. It's important for kids to see that and bring that back to life".

20 Y.O. became Jackson's final album with Virgin Records, and marked the end of a thirteen-year recording history with the label. Following the album's release Kwamé Holland, a producer who worked on the original 20 Y.O. concept prior to Dupri's involvement, stated, "the finished project we had before Jermaine took everything over is crazy. Ask Jimmy & Terry how they felt when Jermaine came in and changed almost everything." In 2005, Jackson initially worked with various producers, including The Neptunes, Dr. Dre, Kwamé, and Polow Da Don, but the concept was changed when Dupri was selected to manage the project after becoming a division president at Virgin Records. After the album's release, Dupri was condemned for his production and misguidance of the album, and subsequently was removed from his position at Virgin Records. Jackson would later describe the time she released 20 Y.O as "a tough time, a tough period in my life".

== Recording and production ==
For the album, Jackson reunited with longtime collaborators Jimmy Jam and Terry Lewis to work with her and Dupri. Conversations between the group began before December 2005, when they elaborated the first themes, and songwriting and recording began in earnest in February. The discussion turned to how Jackson was feeling during the recording of her third studio album Control in 1986. "I started asking questions like, 'What was the feeling of life when you were 20?' I was so intrigued with what was going on in her life then that I just thought her album should be called that", Dupri said. Jam agreed, saying it made sense as a concept because it meant a sense of rejuvenation for her, adding: "A sense of that excitement that people have when they are 20 years old, when their life are beginning." He finished by saying Jackson had that same sense of "hunger and excitement" she had when she was younger. Jackson wanted to create an R&B and dance album, but with an emphasis on dance. Rather than contribute to separate songs for the album, Dupri, Jam and Lewis decided to collaborate. According to the group, the process caused ego and procedural conflicts, but they complemented each other. Jam said: "The great thing about working with Jermaine, he came in with total respect for us, we had total respect for him. The fact is that we were fans of each other and for Janet". Jackson stated:

"This time it was four of us collaborating – Jimmy Jam, Terry Lewis, Jermaine and myself. But it was the same process: Everyone getting all of their thoughts and ideas out on the table, then talking about which ideas to keep or throw out. Johntá Austin also played a part in the album. It was really a collaborative effort, and that's what made it so nice. Jermaine would run into the studio and talk about the songs Jimmy and Terry had done on someone's album. Then Jimmy would start playing the song, and Jermaine would say, 'You know what? Let's do something kind of along those lines as a base. He understood them, he understood me and vice versa".

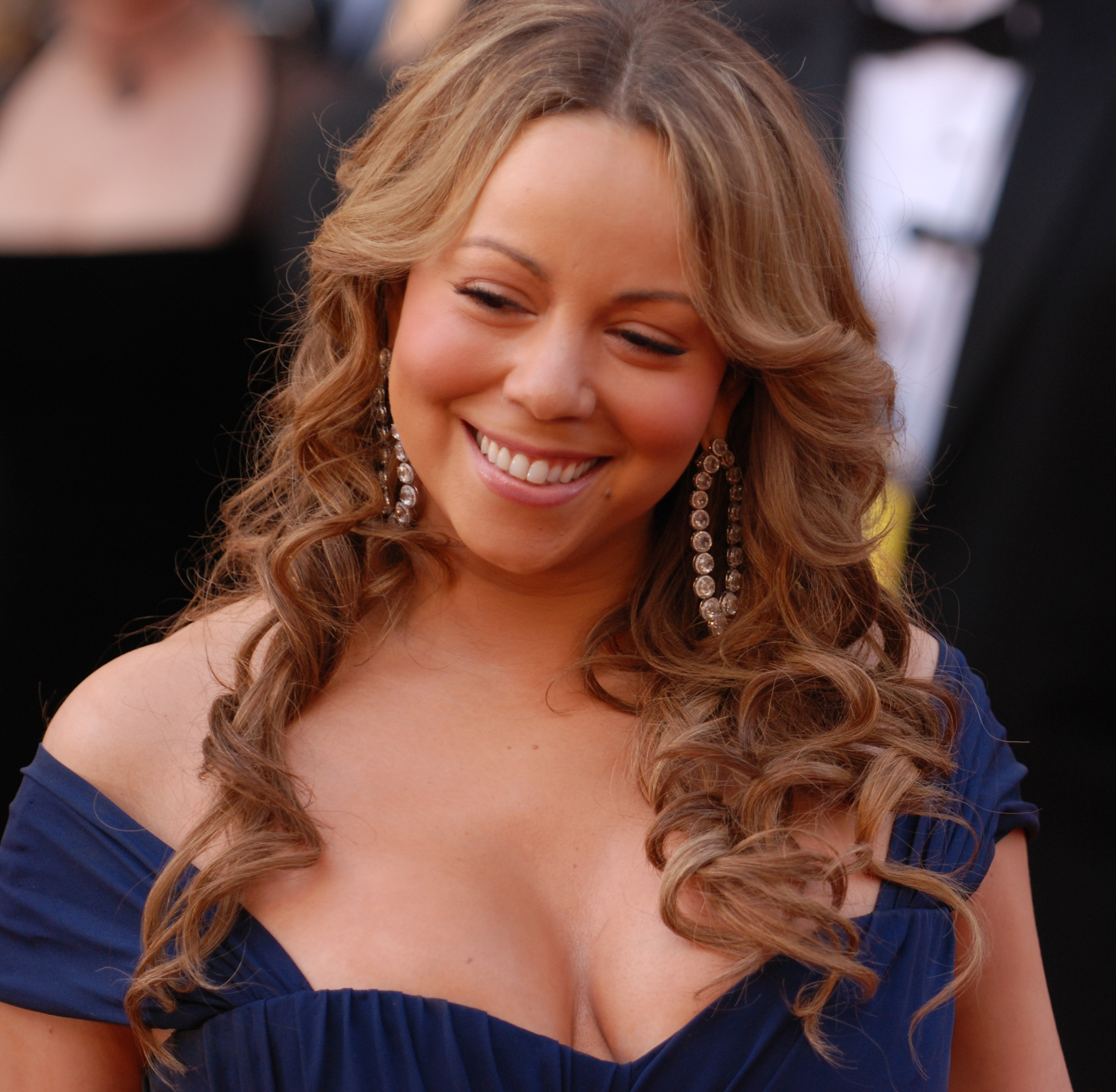
A duet with Mariah Carey (pictured) was planned for the album.

20 Y.O. was recorded chiefly at Jam and Lewis' Flyte Tyme Studios in Los Angeles and Dupri's Southside Studios in Atlanta, with some sections undertaken at The Village in Los Angeles and the Hit Factory in Miami. The concept of 20 Y.O. is a celebration of what was happening musically when Control was released. The addition of Dupri, quotes Jackson as saying, "It's an edge, an attitude, an exciting vibe that's assertive. It's about taking charge. It says, 'Here I am. I'm coming on. Musically, I have it. You want it. And I'm giving it to you.'" With the album Dupri wanted to reconnect Jackson with her urban fan base without losing her pop and dance audience she had built during the last two decades before the album's release. "Times have changed from when Michael and Janet were out in the '80s", he noted, pointing to the fact that urban artists no longer had to cross over to pop genres before achieving maximum exposure and sales. "Janet shouldn't be changing or trying to change to get on pop radio", the producer completed.

Dupri also demonstrated the possibility for a duet with Jackson and American singer Mariah Carey for the album. Carey commented in April 2006, "He never talked to me about that, but if Jermaine has a concept, we should go and write something. I love Janet. I've been a big fan of Janet since 'Con-tro-ol!'". Later, Dupri said that the closer he got to Jackson and Mariah's duet, the more he knew where it should be at, elaborating that he felt it was going to happen. "It depends on how quick my mind moves. We're mixing records for [20 Years Old]. We're not done yet. When I did Usher's My Way album, the last record I created was 'You Make Me Wanna...'. I'm thinking I might go back in, and I might tamper with it. [...] We gotta try to figure it out", he commented. However, the duet never came to fruition.

== Music and lyrics ==
"This album takes me to a place where I haven't been in a while: R&B and dance. I give that credit to Jermaine. I like to say he brought the country to the album, while he says he brought the ghetto. But the dance element was the one thing I was adamant about having. The album also features samples from music that inspired me 20, 25 years ago. There are also some midtempo songs and some of what everyone calls my 'baby-making songs'. Basically, the album is everything that's always been a part of me, but with freshness to it".

— Jackson commenting on the album's theme.

20 Y.O. is composed by eleven songs, an introduction, three interludes and an outro. It starts off with Jackson stating "There's something to be said for not saying anything. I've covered a lot in my 20 years. And I've uncovered a lot" in its intro. The opening song, second single "So Excited" featuring rapper Khia, is a hip-hop track which samples the drum break and turntable scratches from Herbie Hancock's 1983 song "Rockit". In the song, Jackson promises submission for her lover, singing, "If you like it then I'll do it/I'll go head to toe" and "I'm-a keep your body thumping, baby". "Show Me" follows, with Jackson spelling its title throughout the song. The fourth song, "Get It Out Me", is a dance song which was noted to feature Jackson's vocals sounding like her brother Michael's ones. The following song is "Do It 2 Me". It marks a return to Jackson's conversational style; in the song, She is searching for her lover: "My first and only call is to you, time after time, babe, throughout my life". Its music is punctuated by handclaps and by low swoops of a string section. Sixth song "This Body" lyrically is about men who have appreciation with Jackson's appearances in magazines. She addresses her fans in the line "Just had to buy me, had to try me, oooh, you're in love with the hottest girl in the magazine". The song brings sinuous and dark beats incorporating a rhythmic pattern of heavy breathing and the sound of a jet taking off, which was noted to be a metaphor.

An interlude is the opening for eighth track "With U", which was described as "the follow-up to 1986's 'Let's Wait Awhile'", where a couple postpone intimacy. "With U" takes place after the act, which results in romantic confusion. In it, she sings, "I wish you were the one the one I could be with forever". "Call on Me" is the ninth song and lead single from 20 Y.O. It features Nelly, and samples The SOS Band's 1983 song "Tell Me If You Still Care". It includes whispered vocals from both Jackson and Nelly. Second interlude finds Jackson remembering her Good Times days as Penny. "Daybreak", the eleventh song, begins with fairy tale infused chimes before introducing electronic soul handclaps before Jackson starts singing. It has a few lyrics which deal about sex. The following track, "Enjoy", is composed by piano and bass. In the song, Jackson's vocals were heavily treated. Both songs have additional carnival charms, sing-along melodies, and a children's chorus at its end of the latter. An interlude follows, with Jackson calling her lover, asking him to come home. Fourteenth song "Take Care" is a love song which finds the singer pleasuring herself while she waits for her lover. The last song from the album, "Love 2 Love" was recorded by Jackson with her brother Michael in mind. She sings, "We are a couple / Which love knows no bounds". An outro closes the album.

== Title and artwork ==
The four contest-winning covers used for limited edition CD pressings of 20 Y.O..

In February 2006, Dupri revealed the album's title as 20 Years Old, because "that's how old she feels, and that's how long it's been since she put out Control", which was released in 1986. The singer, who at that date was 40 years old, confessed she felt half her age. However, Jackson changed the title to 20 Y.O. after a fan suggestion. Eric Henderson from Slant Magazine heavily criticized the title, saying it did not "let on whether the first letter is plural or singular, whether it's a noun or an adjective. And it would make all the difference". He declared that if it was supposed to stand for "years", it was a forgivable conceit. However, the reviewer feared the acronym was for 20-Year-Old, which would mean a "misguided" move from a woman who was 40, and would illustrate everything wrong with Jackson's direction with the album. He later joked that his third interpretation and his personal favorite was the title to be read phonetically "I'm 20, yo".

A contest for fans to create an album cover image for 20 Y.O. was announced on July 18, 2006, through Yahoo!. Fans were able to create and submit their own album-cover design, with four winners being chosen by Jackson herself. The first million copies of the album would be published with these fan-created covers. The concept of the contest was to create an image that best celebrated Jackson's past twenty years. The singer hand-picked dozens of images that span over twenty years of Jackson's career were made available for download for use in creating the design. "They told me that I should pick maybe 20, 30 photos, but I think I went a little crazy. I picked way more than that. I gave them some of the new stuff I just shot for the album cover shoot. So they have some really recent photos as well as some stuff from 20 years ago", Jackson confessed. For the official artwork of the album, Jackson appears sporting big hair and a wrist full of bracelets.

== Release and promotion ==
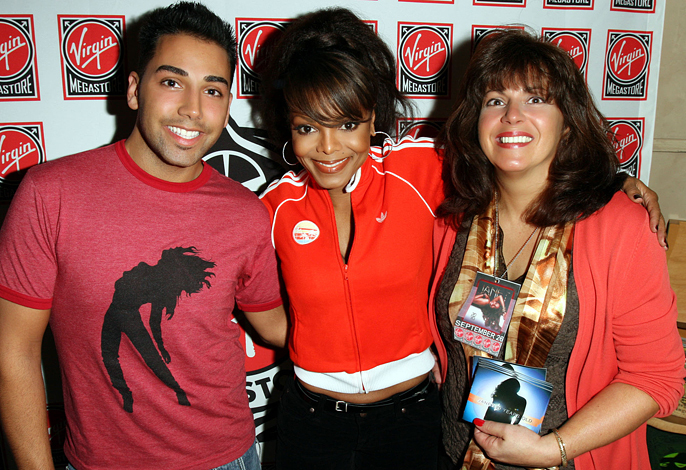
"Design Me" cover contest winner Matthew Zeghibe with Jackson and a guest at the release of 20 Y.O. in the Virgin Megastore in New York City in 2006.

20 Y.O. was released on September 26, 2006, by Virgin Records; its deluxe edition, which included a bonus DVD, was released simultaneously. On May 1, 2006, a web-only song called "Weekend" was made available as a "gift" to fans to download via Jackson's official website. The song is a remake of "Lookout Weekend", a 1984 single by Debbie Deb. It was soon removed from the site and although not included on the album, footage of Jackson recording the track can be seen in the 20 Y.O. The Project piece on the deluxe edition bonus DVD. A MySpace account for Jackson was also set up with new music and videos to promote 20 Y.O. In the lead up to the album's release, Jackson shot covers for Us Weekly, Vibe, Billboard, FHM, GIANT, W, Jezebel, OK!, Ebony, King, Sophisticates Black Hair, Movieline's Hollywood Life, Hype Hair, Men's Fitness, Unleashed, Upscale, and In Touch. Her Us Weekly cover became the biggest-selling issue in the magazine's history, selling 1.4 million copies. Jackson's Vibe issue also received attention from the media after she appeared topless on the August cover.

On September 9, 2006, Jackson went to France to perform "So Excited" at NRJ's Back to School concert, along with past single "Nasty". While on The Oprah Winfrey Show, she was interviewed and performed both tracks again. The show aired on September 25. Jackson held an album signing in Times Square at the Virgin Megastore on September 26, the album's release date. Jackson performed live on the Today show — as part of their Concert Series — three days later. In October, she traveled to Japan to promote the album and wore a red kimono during a press conference there. In November, Jackson performed on The Ellen DeGeneres Show, while she was interviewed on The Tyra Banks Show to further promote the album. On December 4, the singer opened the 2006 Billboard Music Awards with a medley of "The Pleasure Principle" and "So Excited". During rehearsals for the awards two days prior, she taped a performance featuring two classic singles from her catalog, "Nasty" and "Let's Wait Awhile", which was streamed on American Express' website.

Jackson planned to embark on a tour to promote 20 Y.O. around March 2007, with rehearsals beginning in the end of the previous year. According to a Billboard report in September 2006, she and her choreographers were working on ideas for a world tour, but the singer was still not prepared to share those ideas. However, the untitled tour was canceled after she signed a record deal with Island Records, and company executives asked her to record a new album instead, which became 2008's Discipline. Jackson stated: "I was supposed to go on tour with the last album [...] We were actually in full-blown tour rehearsals at that point ... learning numbers, getting everything together, set designs [...] I had to kind of shut everything down and go into the studio."

== Singles ==
"So Excited"
29-second sample from the song's chorus, in which Jackson promises submission to her lover.

The album's first single, "Call on Me", was released to US radio on June 19, 2006. It received mixed reviews from critics. The song was a success on the charts, becoming her most successful single in some countries since "All for You" in 2001. It peaked at number 25 on the Billboard Hot 100. Additionally, it spent two non-consecutive weeks at number one on the Hot R&B/Hip-Hop Songs chart, making it Jackson's sixteenth R&B chart-topper and thirtieth top ten single. Internationally, the song peaked inside the top-twenty in Italy, New Zealand and the United Kingdom. The music video for "Call on Me" was directed by Hype Williams and took ten days to be completed. The music video incorporates Indian, Asian, and African styles, with a mixture of outfits and hairstyles, with a total of five wardrobe changes. "Call on Me" is one of the most expensive music videos of all time, with a production cost of over US$1,000,000. Following its release, it was reported that the video was blacklisted by MTV following her incident at the Super Bowl halftime show, which was co-produced by the network.

The second single, "So Excited", was released on August 28, 2006. Like the previous single, the song also was met with mixed reviews from music commentators, with some considering the song the highlight from 20 Y.O. while others found it disappointing. "So Excited" peaked at number 90 on the Hot 100, and also became her 39th top forty single on the Hot R&B/Hip-Hop Songs chart, reaching number 34. Additionally, on the Hot Dance Club Play chart, "So Excited" became Jackson's 22nd consecutive top ten single and her 17th number-one hit on the chart. It was well also received in Europe. In Finland, "So Excited" peaked at number nine and peaking at number 13 in Spain. Director Joseph Kahn directed its accompanying music video. It depicts Jackson's clothes disappearing through a complex dance routine with female dancers. Also, occasional skeleton people appear in an X-ray effect, and images of Khia appearing in a small TV in an empty room. Due to her diminished role in the music video, she criticized Jackson online. The third single in North America was "With U", which was released to radio on December 11, 2006. Well received by critics, the song managed to reach number 65 on the region's Hot R&B/Hip-Hop Songs chart. "Enjoy" was released only as a promotional single in Japan and received no commercial release.

== Critical reception ==
Professional ratings
Aggregate scores
Source	Rating
Metacritic	52/100
Review scores
Source	Rating
AllMusic	3.5/5 stars
Blender	2/5 stars
Entertainment Weekly	C+
Dotmusic	4/10
The Independent	2/5 stars
NOW	3/5 stars
Rolling Stone	2/5 stars
Slant Magazine	2.5/5 stars
Stylus Magazine	C+
Uncut	2/5 stars

20 Y.O. received generally mixed reviews from music critics. At Metacritic, which assigns a normalized rating, out of 100, to reviews from mainstream critics, the album received an average score of 52, based on 14 reviews, which indicates "mixed or average reviews". Andy Kellman of AllMusic gave the album a three-and-half out of five-star rating, writing that "with only a few exceptions, 20 Y.O. provides further refinements of the fun, flirtatious, midtempo songs of her past several albums. This is not a problem." The New York Times music critic Jon Pareles had mixed feelings, saying "Janet is as crafty and poised as ever. Her flirtations are still a pleasure, but an overly familiar one. She's done these same slinky moves too often to surprise listeners now." Newsday's Glenn Gamboa gave the album a grade of A−, and said that Jackson "may not want to dwell in that past, either. After all, 20 Y.O. shows that her future could be even better." Richard Cromelin from Los Angeles Times was positive saying that 20 Y.O.'s sex themes were slightly toned down from its predecessor, Damita Jo, and, "In the opening set of songs alone, Jackson promises to do it all [...] And she manages to do this without sounding especially raunchy."

Eric Henderson from Slant Magazine said that the saddest thing about 20 Y.O. was Jackson's decision to make a terrible R&B instead of great dance music, which would likely pay off. He also referred to Jam and Lewis's production as "ice-cold beats [that] have melted into a lugubrious, lukewarm pudding—at under an hour, it still feels almost twice as long as Janet. and The Velvet Rope." With a C+ rating, Thomas Inskeep from Stylus Magazine called it "half-decent" and went to say, "there's precious little to get, well, excited about here. Janet commits the ultimate sin of making an album that's thoroughly mediocre. Apart from the sticky ear-candy of "So Excited," there's little I'd miss here if I went six months without it. This doesn't sound like rejuvenation—it sounds like the beginning of the end." The Village Voice's music critic Miles Marshall Lewis commented that Jackson's last two albums also talked excessively about sex, and with the new release, it was getting tired. Evan Serpick from Rolling Stone disagreed with the album's reference to Control, saying "If we were her, we wouldn't make the comparison." Angus Batey, writing for Yahoo! Music UK, remarked that in Jackson's producers desire to take Jackson back to her roots, they made not a great album for Jackson, but a facsimile of one; correct in all the details, but lacking substance and soul. Robert Christgau gave it a "dud" score.

== Accolades ==
Year	Award	Category	Recipient	Result	Ref.
2006	BDSCertified Spin Award	50,000 Spins Award	"Call on Me"	Won	
2007	Grammy Award	Best Contemporary R&B Album	20 Y.O.	Nominated	

== Commercial performance ==
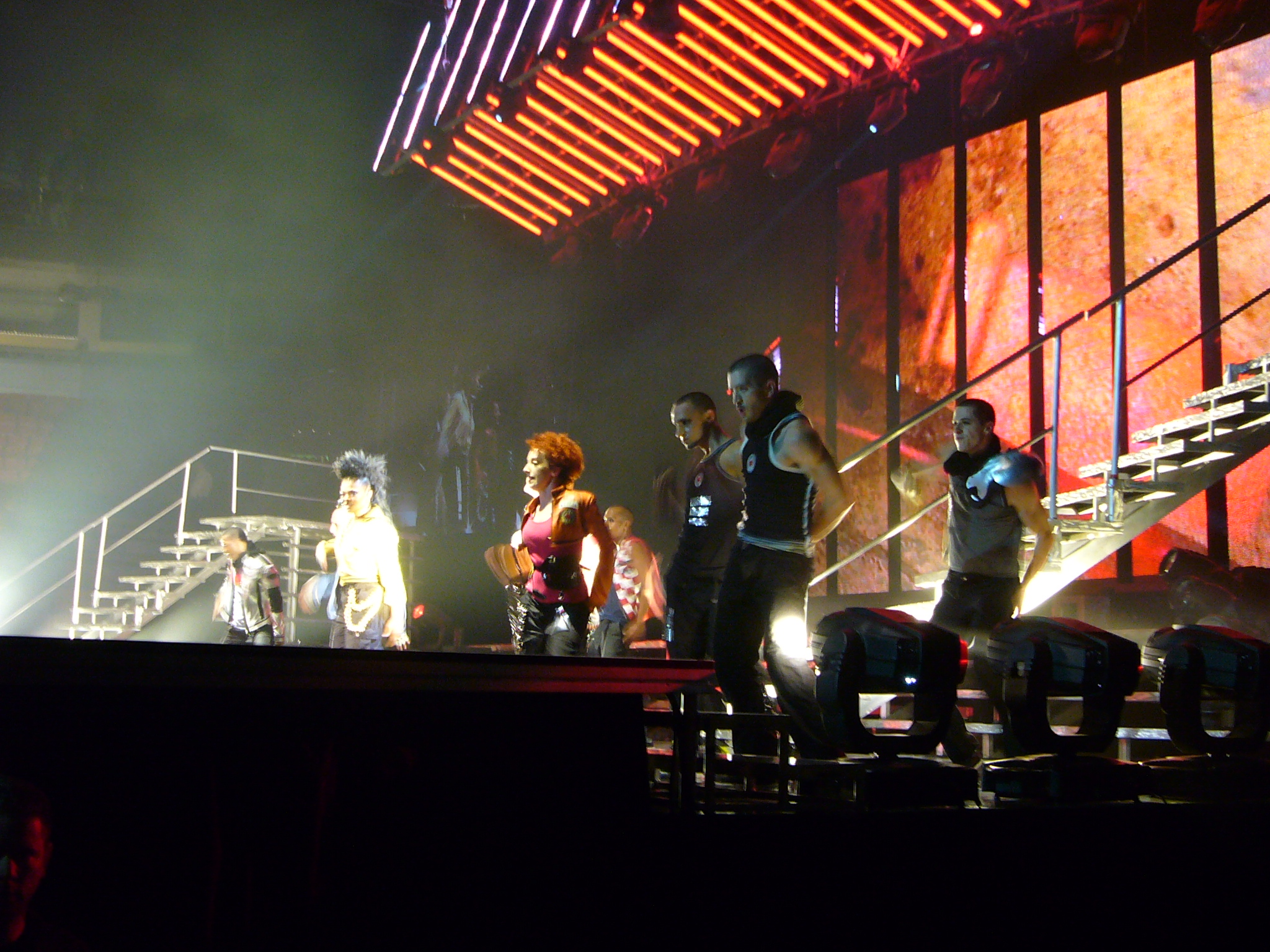
Jackson performing "So Excited" from the album during the Rock Witchu Tour in 2008.

20 Y.O. debuted on the US Billboard 200 at number two with 296,000 copies sold at its first week, behind Ludacris' album Release Therapy. This was considerably lower than Jackson's previous album Damita Jo, which also opened at number two with 381,000 copies sold across the United States in 2004. 20 Y.O. became her smallest first week sales since The Velvet Rope (1997), which reached number one with 202,000 copies. However, the effort debuted at the top on the Top R&B/Hip-Hop Albums. In its second week, the album fell to number nine, selling 77,000 units, representing a 74% drop in sales. It additionally reached number two and number three on Top Digital Albums and Top Tastemaker Albums charts, respectively. On November 13, 2006, the album was certified platinum by the Recording Industry Association of America (RIAA) for shipments of one million copies within the country. As of January 2008, the estimated sales of the album in the US were 679,000 copies.

On the Australian Albums Chart, it peaked at number 55. It became her lowest-peaking album in the region since Control in 1986, which reached number 25. In Japan, the album debuted at the number 12 on the Oricon Albums Chart selling 20,380 copies in its first week. It ultimately peaked at number seven in the region. A few weeks after, the Recording Industry Association of Japan (RIAJ) certified 20 Y.O. gold for shipments of 100,000 copies.

In the Flemish region of Belgium, 20 Y.O. debuted at number 67 on October 7, 2006, moving to its peak of number 58 the next week, and staying on the charts for five weeks. In contrast, it reached number 22 in the Walloon region of that country. The album entered the French Albums Chart at number 32 in the week dated September 30, 2006, this being its peak. It lasted on the chart for four weeks, felling off the chart on October 21, 2006, at number 175. 20 Y.O. debuted and peaked at number 46 on October 6, 2006, in Germany, next week the album fell to number 96 before falling off the charts. On the Italian Albums Chart it fared better, reaching number 21. In Switzerland, the album debuted and peaked at number 35 on the Swiss Albums Chart and stayed on the charts for four weeks. In the United Kingdom, the album peaked at number 63 on its album chart. In the Netherlands, 20 Y.O. debuted and peaked at number 34, the issue dated September 30, 2006. Almost one month after, it fell out of the chart at number 93. On the European Top 100 Albums, the record reached number 43. The album had sold an estimated 1.5 million copies worldwide.

== Track listing ==
20 Y.O. – Standard edition
No.	Title	Writer(s)	Producer(s)	Length
1.	"(Intro) 20"	James Samuel "Jimmy Jam" Harris III; Terry Lewis; Janet Jackson	Jackson; Jimmy Jam and Terry Lewis	0:53
2.	"So Excited" (featuring Khia)	Jackson; Jermaine Dupri; James Phillips; Johnta Austin; Harris; Lewis; Khia Chambers; Herbie Hancock; Michael Beinhorn; Bill Laswell	Dupri; LRoc; Jam and Lewis; Jackson	3:14
3.	"Show Me"	Jackson; Dupri; Manuel Seal, Jr.; Austin; Harris; Lewis	Dupri; Seal; Jam and Lewis; Jackson	3:38
4.	"Get It Out Me"	Jackson; Dupri; Seal; Austin; Harris; Lewis	Dupri; Seal; Jam and Lewis; Jackson	3:05
5.	"Do It 2 Me"	Jackson; Austin; Dupri; Brenda Russell	Dupri; No I.D.; Jam and Lewis; Jackson	4:06
6.	"This Body"	Jackson; Dupri; Phillips; Austin; Harris; Lewis	Dupri; LRoc; Jam and Lewis; Jackson	4:10
7.	"20 Part 2" (Interlude)			0:27
8.	"With U"	Jackson; Dupri; Seal; Austin; Harris; Lewis	Dupri; Seal; Jam and Lewis; Jackson	5:09
9.	"Call on Me" (with Nelly)	Dupri; Austin; Phillips; Cornell Haynes, Jr.; Harris; Lewis	Dupri; LRoc; Jam and Lewis; Jackson	3:24
10.	"20 Part 3" (Interlude)			0:28
11.	"Daybreak"	Jackson; Harris; Lewis; Austin	Jam and Lewis; Jackson	4:21
12.	"Enjoy"	Jackson; Harris; Lewis; Bobby Ross Avila; Issiah J. Avila	Jam and Lewis; Jackson; The Avila Brothers	4:31
13.	"20 Part 4" (Interlude)	Jackson; Harris; Lewis	Jackson; Jam and Lewis	0:43
14.	"Take Care"	Jackson; Harris; Lewis	Jackson; Jam and Lewis	5:43
15.	"Love 2 Love"	Jackson; Harris; Lewis; Austin	Jackson; Jam and Lewis	5:04
16.	"(Outro) 20 Part 5"	Jackson; Harris; Lewis	Jackson; Jam and Lewis	1:03
Total length:				49:54

20 Y.O. – iTunes Store and international digital edition (bonus track)
No.	Title	Writer(s)	Producer(s)	Length
17.	"Roll Witchu"	Jackson; Harris; Lewis	Jackson; Jam and Lewis	4:30
Total length:				54:24

20 Y.O. – Japanese edition (bonus track)
No.	Title	Writer(s)	Producer(s)	Length
18.	"Days Go By"	Jackson; Harris; Lewis	Jackson; Jam and Lewis	4:16
Total length:				58:40

20 Y.O. – Deluxe edition (bonus DVD)
No.	Title	Length
1.	"The Photo Shoot"	3:02
2.	"In the Studio"	3:02
3.	"Dancer Auditions"	3:10
4.	"Call on Me" (The Making of the Video)	7:46
Total length:		17:00

Notes

- "This Body" features an uncredited rap by Jermaine Dupri, under the alias "Cocaine J".

Sample credits

- "So Excited" contains a sample of "Rock It" (1983) by Herbie Hancock.
- "Do It 2 Me" contains a sample of "If Only for One Night" by Brenda Russell.
- "Call on Me" samples The SOS Band's 1983 song "Tell Me If You Still Care".

== Personnel ==
- Johntá Austin – composer (Tracks 2–6, 8–9, 11, 15)
- Bobby Ross Avila – bass, composer, drums, keyboards, producer (Track 12)
- Issiah "IZ" Avila – percussion, drums, producer (Track 12)
- Khia Chambers – composer, featured artist (Track 2)
- Fran Cooper – make-up
- Larry Corbett – cello (Track 14)
- Kenneth Crear – management
- Ian Cross – recording engineer (Tracks 2–6, 8–9, 11–12, 14–15), audio mixing (15)
- Jermaine Dupri – composer (Tracks 2–6, 8–9), producer (2–6, 8), executive producer, audio mixing (2–6, 8–9), uncredited rap (6)
- Liliana Filipovic – violin (Track 8)
- Bernie Grundman – mastering
- Terrance "T-Love" Harris – personal assistant
- Gerardo Hilera – violin (Track 8)
- John Horesco IV – recording engineer (Tracks 2–6, 8–9)
- Josh Houghkirk – audio mixing assistant (Tracks 2–6, 8–9, 11–12, 14–15)
- Janet Jackson – composer (Tracks 1–8, 10–16), producer (All Tracks), liner notes, executive producer
- Paul Jackson, Jr. – guitar (Tracks 6, 8, 14)
- Jimmy Jam – keyboards (Tracks 8, 11–12, 14–15), producer (All Tracks), additional music (2–4, 6, 9), executive producer, drum programming (11, 14–15), audio mixing (11–12, 14–15)
- Suzie Katayama – string arrangements (Tracks 8, 14)
- Cheryl Kohfeld – viola (Track 8)
- Terry Lewis – composer (Tracks 1–4, 6–16), producer, additional music (2–4, 6, 9), audio mixing (11–12, 14–15)
- Andrea Liberman – stylist
- Matt Marrin – recording engineer (Tracks 8, 12, 14)
- Diane McDonald – coordination
- Tadd Mingo – assistant engineer
- No I.D. – producer (Track 5)
- Sara Parkins – violin (Track 14)
- Robert Peterson – violin (Track 8)
- James Phillips – composer (Tracks 2, 6, 9)
- Michele Richards – violin (Track 14)
- Steve Richards – cello (Track 14)
- Brenda Russell – composer (Track 5)
- Manuel Seal, Jr. – composer, producer (Tracks 3–4, 8)
- Vida Sparks – project coordinator
- Rudolph Stein – cello (Track 8)
- Phil Tan – audio mixing (Tracks 2–6, 8–9, 11–12, 14–15)
- Josephina Vergara – violin (Track 14)
- Benjamin Ward – art direction, packaging
- James White – photography
- Chuck Wilson – assistant recording engineer (Tracks 3–5, 8, 11)
- Ghian Wright – assistant recording engineer (Tracks 12, 14–15)
- Johnny Wright – executive producer, management
- Janet Zeitoun – hair stylist
- Yang-Qin Zhao – cello (Track 8)
- Danny Zook – sample clearance

== Charts ==
=== Weekly charts ===
Chart (2006)	Peak position
Australian Albums (ARIA)	55
Australian Urban Albums (ARIA)	7
Belgian Albums (Ultratop Flanders)	58
Belgian Albums (Ultratop Wallonia)	22
Canadian Albums (Billboard)	4
Dutch Albums (Album Top 100)	34
European Top 100 Albums (Billboard)	43
French Albums (SNEP)	32
German Albums (Offizielle Top 100)	46
Italian Albums (FIMI)	21
Japanese Albums (Oricon)	7
New Zealand Albums (RMNZ)	56
Swedish Albums (Sverigetopplistan)	57
Swiss Albums (Schweizer Hitparade)	35
Taiwanese Albums (Five Music)	9
UK Albums (Official Charts)	63
UK R&B Albums (Official Charts)	14
US Billboard 200	2
US Top R&B/Hip-Hop Albums (Billboard)	1

=== Year-end charts ===
Chart (2006)	Position
US Billboard 200	120
US Top R&B/Hip-Hop Albums (Billboard)	28

Chart (2007)	Position
US Top R&B/Hip-Hop Albums (Billboard)	99

== Certifications ==
Region	Certification	Certified units/sales
Japan (RIAJ)	Gold	100,000^{^}
United States (RIAA)	Platinum	655,000
^{^} Shipments figures based on certification alone.

== Release history ==
Region	Date	Edition(s)	Format(s)	Label(s)	Ref.
Japan	September 20, 2006	Standard	CD; digital download	EMI	
Italy	September 22, 2006	Standard; deluxe	CD; CD+DVD; digital download; LP	EMI	
Germany	September 22, 2006	Standard; deluxe	CD; CD+DVD; digital download; LP	EMI	
France	September 25, 2006	Standard; deluxe	CD; CD+DVD; digital download; LP	EMI	
United Kingdom	September 25, 2006	Standard; deluxe	CD; CD+DVD; digital download; LP	Virgin	
Canada	September 26, 2006	Standard; deluxe	CD; CD+DVD; digital download; LP	EMI	
Mexico	September 26, 2006	Standard; deluxe	CD; CD+DVD; digital download; LP	EMI	
United States	September 26, 2006	Standard; deluxe	CD; CD+DVD; digital download; LP	Virgin	
Japan	September 27, 2006	Deluxe	CD+DVD	EMI	
India	October 6, 2006	Standard	CD; digital download	EMI	

== See also ==
- List of Billboard number-one R&B albums of 2006
