= Ah ha =

Ah ha may refer to:

- "Ah Ha" (song), a song by American rapper Cardi B
- "Ah Ha", a track on the music album Gangstress by American rapper Khia
- A-ha, a Norwegian new wave/synthpop/pop rock/alternative rock band
