= Love Locs =

Studio album by Khia
- Released: July 4, 2014
- Recorded: 2012–2014
- Genre: Hip hop; R&B
- Length: 53:11
- Label: Thug Misses Entertainment
- Producer: Khia

Khia chronology
MotorMouf aka Khia Shamone (2012)	Love Locs (2014)	QueenDomCum (2016)

Deluxe edition cover

Singles from Love Locs
- 1. "You Deserve It" Released: May 23, 2014

Love Locs is the fifth studio album by American rapper Khia and was released digitally on July 4, 2014, on her own label Thug Misses Entertainment.

== Track listing ==
All songs written by Khia

No.	Title	Length
1.	"Mirror, Mirror" (Intro)	2:56
2.	"I'm Hott"	4:49
3.	"What Eva Khia Wants" (Skit)	1:27
4.	"Fool Proof" (Intro)	0:59
5.	"Fool Proof"	8:41
6.	"LoveLocs"	5:23
7.	"You Deserve It" (Skit)	2:03
8.	"You Deserve It"	4:02
9.	"My Neck My Back" (Skit)	0:53
10.	"LazerPop"	3:45
11.	"My X"	3:21
12.	"Mirror Mirror" (Skit)	2:06
13.	"PsychicEyes"	4:10
14.	"Running2you"	3:00
15.	"Rooster"	4:32
16.	"Mirror Mirror" (Outro)	1:04

== Release history ==
Country	Date	Label	Format
Various	July 4, 2014	Thug Misses Entertainment	Digital download
