= With U =

Single by Janet Jackson

from the album 20 Y.O.
- Released: December 11, 2006
- Recorded: 2006
- Studio: Flyte Tyme Studios (Santa Monica, CA); Studio Atlantis (West Hollywood, CA)
- Length: 5:04 (album version); 4:00 (radio edit)
- Label: Virgin
- Songwriters: Janet Jackson; Jermaine Dupri; Manuel Seal Jr.; Johntá Austin; James Harris III, Terry Lewis
- Producers: Janet Jackson; Jermaine Dupri; Manuel Seal Jr.; Jimmy Jam and Terry Lewis

Janet Jackson singles chronology
"So Excited" (2006)	"With U" (2006)	"Feedback" (2007)

"With U" is a song recorded by American singer Janet Jackson for her ninth studio album 20 Y.O. (2006). It was written by Johntá Austin, Jackson, Jermaine Dupri, Manuel Seal Jr., James Harris III, and Terry Lewis, with production handled by the latter five. It was serviced exclusively to urban contemporary radio on December 11, 2006 as the third single from 20 Y.O. by Virgin Records.

"With U" was considered a follow-up to Jackson's single "Let's Wait Awhile" (1986), in which two characters postpone intimacy. However, "With U" takes place after the act, resulting in "romantic confusion". The song received positive reviews from most music critics, being called "smooth and lushly". It peaked at number 65 on US Hot R&B/Hip-Hop Songs.

== Background and development ==
Following the release of her eighth studio album Damita Jo (2004), Jackson began recording a new album project the next year. Her then-fiancé, record producer Jermaine Dupri, was eventually commissioned to executive produce the project. Producer Jimmy Jam revealed Jackson became more confident with her writing ability during recording, doing the bulk of the album's writing. He commented: "We're all kind of back in there doing it again together, which I really enjoy. It's the physical nature of sitting in the same room and really hashing it out. It's like, 'You're not going to leave until we have a lyric,' so it's fun". Jackson further commented about working with Dupri, Lewis and Terry, saying:

"It was really a collaborative effort, and that's what made it so nice. Jermaine would run into the studio and talk about the songs Jimmy and Terry had done on someone's album. Then Jimmy would start playing the song, and Jermaine would say, 'You know what? Let's do something kind of along those lines as a base.' He understood them, he understood me and vice versa."

== Music and lyrics ==
"With U"
A 28 second sample of "With U".

"With U" was written by Jackson, Jermaine Dupri, Manuel Seal Jr., Johntá Austin, Jimmy Jam and Terry Lewis, while production was handled by Jackson, Dupri, Seal Jr., Jam and Lewis. A mid-tempo R&B song, it was described as "the follow-up to 1986's 'Let's Wait Awhile'", where two people postpone intimacy. "With U" takes place after the act, which results, according to Jackson, in "romantic confusion". Dupri called the song "a bona fide smash."

== Critical reception ==
The song received generally positive reviews from most music critics. Andy Kellman of AllMusic picked "With U" as one of the album's highlights. Jon Pareles from The New York Times called it a "lushly harmonized ballad," while Don Baiocchi of Blogcritics named it "a stripped-down ballad that recalls the forgotten beauty of 1990's "Come Back to Me" with a modern sound that Mariah should be jealous of." Johnny Loftus writing for Metro Times wrote that on "With U", Jackson "sounds like Mariah Carey covering classic Michael Jackson."

Chuck Arnold from People magazine also enjoyed the ballad, describing it as "a smooth and creamy ballad that plays like a sequel to Control's 'Let's Wait Awhile'." Spence D. of IGN commented that the song "continues the strange intersection where Janet sounds like Michael on the verses and then gets her voice obviously treated for the choruses, dipping into the feminine whirl that she's so famous for." Glenn Gamboa, writer for Newsday, expressed a positive reaction, calling it "a nice quiet-storm ballad." Adversely, Angus Batey of Yahoo! Music wrote that Jackson "sounds disturbingly like her most famous sibling" and "seems oblivious" on the track.

== Commercial performance ==
"With U" debuted at number 74 on the US Hot R&B/Hip-Hop Songs chart the week ending December 30, 2006; it later peaked at number 65. However, unlike previous singles from 20 Y.O., it failed to enter the Billboard Hot 100.

== Live performance ==
For the very first time, Jackson included the song on her 2024 tour Together Again Tour. Jackson featured the song on the setlist for her Janet Jackson: Las Vegas show in 2024-2025.

== Track listings and formats ==
U.S. digital single

1. "With U" (Radio Edit) – 3:57
2. "With U" (Instrumental) – 5:02

US 12" single

1. "With U" (Album Version) – 5:03
2. "With U" (Instrumental) – 5:02
3. "With U" (Radio Edit) – 3:57
4. "With U" (A Cappella) – 4:11

US promo CD single

1. "With U" (Radio Edit) – 3:57
2. "With U" (Album Version) – 5:03
3. "With U" (Instrumental) – 5:02

== Charts ==
Weekly chart performance for "With U"
Chart (2007)	Peak position
US Hot R&B/Hip-Hop Songs (Billboard)	65

== Release history ==
Release dates and formats for "With U"
Region	Date	Format(s)	Label(s)	Ref.
United States	December 19, 2006	Digital download	Virgin	
United States	January 16, 2007	12-inch vinyl	Virgin	
