= LROC =

LROC may refer to:

- LRoc, songwriter and producer
- Lunar Reconnaissance Orbiter Camera, cameras on a NASA robotic spacecraft orbiting the Moon
