= Nasti Muzik =

Studio album by Khia
- Released: July 22, 2008
- Recorded: 2006–2008
- Genre: Hip hop
- Length: 56:27
- Label: Big Cat
- Producer: Marlon "Big Cat" Rowe (exec.); Khia (also exec.); Melvin "Birdman" Breeden (also exec.); Gerald "Craze" Coats; Push A Key Productions; Lloyd Ellis; Corey "Crumhead" Creswell; G Dinero Beats

Khia chronology
Gangstress (2006)	Nasti Muzik (2008)	MotorMouf aka Khia Shamone (2012)

Singles from Nasti Muzik
- 1. "What They Do" Released: February 14, 2008; 2. "Be Your Lady" Released: April 22, 2008; 3. "Like Me" Released: July 6, 2008

Professional ratings
Review scores
Source	Rating
Metromix	3/5 stars
RapReviews	5/10
SixShot	Positive

Nasti Muzik is the third studio album from American rapper Khia. The album was released on July 22, 2008 on Thug Misses Entertainment/Big Cat Records. One of the feature producers on the album is DJ Craze, with Gucci Mane and Maceo being the featured guest artists on the album.

"What They Do" was the first single off the album but did not chart but had a successful underground and streets impact. The second single, "Be Your Lady", was produced by Tampa's Push-a-Key Productions. The track "Been the Shit" was stated in an interview to be about the process of one being birthed by one's mother, mimicking the biological process of passing waste through the digestive system and depositing said waste through one's anus. The track "Put That Pussy on His Ass" was stated to be about the sexual act of scissoring a two way dildo with a gay man.

== Track listing ==
No.	Title	Producer(s)	Length
1.	"Nasti Muzik"	Lloyd Ellis; Khia	2:17
2.	"My Swag"	G Dinero Beats; Khia	4:40
3.	"Be Your Lady"	Lloyd Ellis; Khia	3:53
4.	"Shit on Me" (Skit)		0:28
5.	"Like Me"	Gerald "Craze" Coats; Khia	3:50
6.	"Get It and Go" (Skit)		1:29
7.	"Put That Pussy on His Ass"	Push A Key Productions; Khia	3:30
8.	"It's Whatever" (Skit)		0:42
9.	"It's Whatever"	Corey "Crumhead" Creswell; Khia	3:55
10.	"I Refuse" (Skit)		1:10
11.	"Get Out"	Gerald "Craze" Coats; Khia	3:35
12.	"That's Why They Be Haten"	Gerald "Craze" Coats; Khia	4:14
13.	"Fuck You and Suck You" (Skit)		0:44
14.	"Ass Talk" (featuring Maceo)	Melvin "Mel Man" Breeden	4:09
15.	"Geeked Up"	Gerald "Craze" Coats; Khia	3:46
16.	"Bitch Bitch" (Skit)		0:18
17.	"Been the Shit"	Push A Key Productions; Khia	3:37
18.	"Whistle on It"	Push A Key Productions; Khia	4:03
19.	"What They Do" (featuring Gucci Mane)	Melvin "Mel Man" Breeden	3:25
20.	"Steer"	Khia	3:07
