= Call on Me (Janet Jackson song) =

Single by Janet Jackson and Nelly

from the album 20 Y.O.
- Released: June 19, 2006
- Recorded: 2005
- Studio: Flyte Tyme (Santa Monica); Southside (Atlanta)
- Genre: R&B
- Length: 3:30
- Label: Virgin
- Songwriters: Johntá Austin; Cornell Haynes; Jermaine Mauldin; James Phillips; James Harris III; Terry Lewis
- Producers: Janet Jackson; Jermaine Dupri; LRoc; Jimmy Jam and Terry Lewis

Janet Jackson singles chronology
"Don't Worry" (2005)	"Call on Me" (2006)	"So Excited" (2006)

Nelly singles chronology
"Nasty Girl" (2005)	"Call on Me" (2006)	"Wadsyaname" (2007)

Music video
- "Call on Me" on YouTube

"Call on Me" is a song by American singer Janet Jackson and American rapper Nelly from Jackson's ninth studio album 20 Y.O. (2006). It was written by Jermaine Dupri, Johnta Austin, LRoc, Nelly, Jimmy Jam and Terry Lewis, and produced by Dupri, LRoc, Jam and Lewis, in addition to Jackson. "Call on Me" was released as the album's lead single on June 19, 2006, by Virgin Records. The song is a mid-tempo ballad which talks about calling on a person when a friend or somebody to listen is needed.

"Call on Me" received mixed reviews from music critics, although some picked it as one of the best tracks on the album, calling it a "lovely and elegant" ballad. The song was a moderate success commercially, becoming her most successful single in some countries since "All for You" (2001). It peaked at number 25 on the US Billboard Hot 100. Additionally, it spent two non-consecutive weeks atop the US Hot R&B/Hip-Hop Songs, making it Jackson's 16th number-one single on the chart. Internationally, the song peaked within the top 20 in Ireland, Italy, New Zealand and the United Kingdom.

The accompanying music video for "Call on Me" was directed by Hype Williams and took ten days to complete. Incorporating Indian, Asian, and African styles, outfits worn in the video included a specially designed kimono, metal corset, and nine-inch platform heels. "Call on Me" is one of the most expensive music videos of all time, with a production cost of over $1 million. Following its release, it was reported that the video was blacklisted by MTV, following her incident at the Super Bowl halftime show in 2004, which was co-produced by the network. To promote 20 Y.O., Jackson performed the song with Nelly on TV show Today, as well as on two of her concert tours.

== Background and writing ==
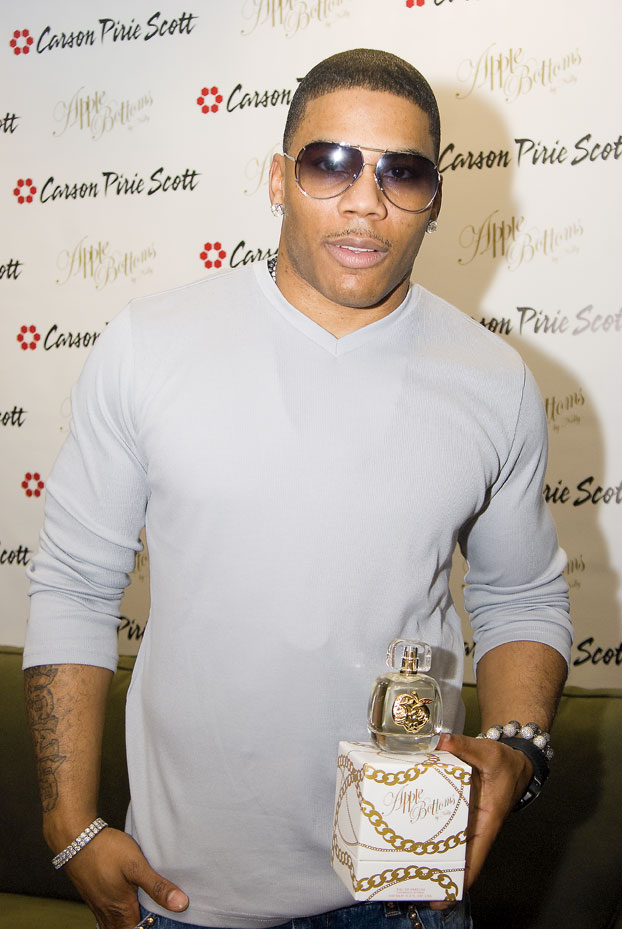
Nelly (pictured) is the featured artist on the track.

In 2004, Jackson released her eighth studio album, Damita Jo. The album debuted at number two on the Billboard 200, was certified Platinum by the Recording Industry Association of America (RIAA), and sold over three million copies worldwide. However, its singles received minimal airplay due to a blacklist of Jackson's music and videos on many music channels and radio formats caused by legalities surrounding the Super Bowl XXXVIII halftime show controversy. Jackson then decided to start to work on a new project in the coming year, involving her then-fiancé, record producer Jermaine Dupri, who was commissioned to executive produce the project, in addition to a number of other producers. She decided to create a modern record, while returning to R&B and dance music, in the vein of her hit album, Control (1986). Producer Jimmy Jam revealed that while recording the album, Janet became more confident with her writing ability, doing the bulk of the writing. He also commented, "We're all kind of back in there doing it again together, which I really enjoy." It's the physical nature of sitting in the same room and really hashing it out. It's like, 'You're not going to leave until we have a lyric,' so it's fun." Jackson and Jimmy both agreed that Dupri molded well into their tri due to him being a fan of Jam and Lewis' work and vice versa.

During the sessions, "Call on Me" was written. For the song, Jackson revealed that Nelly and Dupri had been in the studio alone working together, and came up with the record on their own. They called Jackson up, played it for her over the phone, and asked if she wanted to record it. Jackson obliged. Speaking about the song, Dupri said "It's a duet between her and Nelly. It's the jump-off. We don't just have a record that's just a Nelly and Janet record. I believe this record is gonna be one of the biggest records on radio this year. Outside of who it is, it's a well-put-together song." Dupri also commented about Nelly's addition to the song, saying:

"Nelly, I try to do what I do with my friends. Me and him had just come off the success of 'Grillz' at the time I made this record. He was the person on my mind. "Especially since Janet only made records, not to disrespect Q-Tip or Heavy D, but as far as popular rappers in this day and time, Busta Rhymes was the only one. We was trying to go to the radio and not do the typical R&B featured record. I was trying to be more creative and find somebody who can do melody as well as rap on the record. Nelly doesn't really rap on this song, he's singing. He has that different style. That's kind of what the record is. We see that enough: R&B with a rapper feature. That's why I call this a duet as opposed to a feature".

The first single from 20 Y.O. was thought to be released in February initially. However, it had an initial release date for May.

== Composition and lyrics ==
"Call on Me"

"Call on Me" was written by Jermaine Dupri, Johntá Austin, James Phillips, Nelly, Jimmy Jam and Terry Lewis, while production was handled by Janet Jackson, Dupri, Phillips, Jam and Lewis. It is a mid-tempo ballad which samples The SOS Band's 1983 song "Tell Me If You Still Care," also written and produced by Jimmy Jam and Terry Lewis. According to Dupri, lyrically, "It's really just a record about when you need a friend, somebody you need to talk to, just call on a person. It's a friend record. It ain't really a boyfriend/girlfriend record. The way Nelly and Janet are talking is more girlfriend/boyfriend, but it really goes out to friends."

== Critical reception ==
"Call on Me" garnered mixed reviews from music critics. Andy Kellman of AllMusic picked the song as one of the album's best songs. Jon Pareles of The New York Times called it a "tinkly-twinkly tune," while Thomas Inskeep of Stylus Magazine named it "a lovely little pillow of a midtempo ballad, with Janet singing off Nelly (who’s also singing, which he arguably does better than he raps)." Jeevan Panesar of The Situation picked the song as one of the "Top Three Tracks", praising "its playful melody, easy listening and warm energy," but ultimately, calling it "easily forgettable."

Tracy E. Hopkins of Barnes & Noble wrote that the song "won't wow too many fans with its nursery rhyme-like." Spence D. of IGN was mixed, writing, "The obligatory star power guest shot occurs with 'Call On Me' featuring Nelly. Janet goes for her delicate wisp, but it sounds as if she's trying hard to maintain the crispness, straining to keep from cracking. Nelly delivers a slippery grind, making this also the obligatory 'time to get your sex on' number." Don Baiocchi of Blogcritics was mixed, writing that "to kick off a comeback with the mediocre 'Call On Me,' a duet where she actually makes Nelly sing, is just plain wrong. 'Call on Me' wasn't the way to do that." He also noted that "details like the tiny hand claps in 'Call On Me' are bizarre missteps." Evan Serpick of Rolling Stone wrote that "it shamelessly re-creates 'Dilemma,' the St. Louis rapper's collaboration with Kelly Rowland." Johnny Loftus of Metro Times was also negative, writing that the song "falls flat."

== Chart performance ==
"Call on Me" debuted at number eight on the Billboard Bubbling Under Hot 100 Singles chart, a position roughly equivalent to number one hundred and eight on the Hot 100. The song also debuted at number forty-eight on the Hot R&B/Hip-Hop Songs chart two days after its official release, which was the highest debut of the week. The following week, the song debuted on the Billboard Hot R&B/Hip-Hop Airplay chart at number nineteen, the highest debut since TLC's "No Scrubs", which debuted at number thirteen in February 1999. "Call on Me" was released on the iTunes Store on July 18, 2006, which helped the song rise from number sixty-three to number twenty-five, the song's Hot 100 peak position. The following week, the song lost digital download points and fell to number thirty-three in its sixth week on the Hot 100. A limited retail shipment of the single was released on September 5, 2006 in the U.S. The song quickly reached number one on the Hot 100 Singles Sales chart, where it remained for six non-consecutive weeks, making it her longest stay atop the sales chart, beating out 1993's "That's the Way Love Goes", which spent five. "Call on Me" spent six weeks atop the Hot R&B/Hip-Hop Singles Sales chart.

The song also topped the Hot R&B/Hip-Hop Songs chart for two non-consecutive weeks, becoming Jackson's fifteenth number-one R&B hit, her first since 2001's "All for You". It was Nelly's fourth number one on the R&B chart, his first since 2002's "Dilemma". "Call on Me" became Janet's thirtieth top 10 single on Billboard's Hot R&B/Hip-Hop Songs chart, which tied her with R. Kelly for scoring the most top 10 singles ever in the chart's history. In late September, "Call on Me" became the first of Jackson's number-one R&B hits to return to the pole position after dropping from number one. Overall, "Call on Me" was a success, finishing as the eighth best-selling single of the year and second in the urban format. It was the twenty-seventh most played song at urban radio and finished overall at number twenty-two on Billboard's 2006 Hot R&B/Hip-Hop Songs year-end chart.

In the United Kingdom, "Call on Me" became Jackson’s 33rd top twenty single when it debuted at number eighteen the week of September 23, 2006; it was the highest-charting new entry of that week. It spent five weeks on the chart, dropping at number 70, on October 28, 2006. The track also became a top twenty hit in several European countries. In Finland, the song peaked at number 20. In Ireland, the song also debuted and peaked at number 20, on the IRMA chart week ending September 21, 2006. The song was even more successful in New Zealand, where it debuted at number 40, but ultimately peaked at number 11, spending 11 weeks on the chart. In Italy, the song peaked higher, debuting at number seven on the FIMI charts.

== Music video ==
Jackson wearing a maroon-colored gown standing in an ocean while clouds can be shown in the background in the "Call on Me" music video. It is noted as one of the most expensive music videos ever made.

The music video for "Call on Me" was directed by Hype Williams and took ten days to be completed. The video's theme was inspired by Aesop’s Fables and is composed of live action and animation. It was filmed inside an aircraft hangar at the JFK Airport in New York City. The music video incorporates Indian, Asian, and African styles, with a mixture of outfits and hairstyles. Outfits worn in the video included a specially designed Kimono, metal corset, and nine-inch platform heels, with a total of five wardrobe changes. "Call on Me" is one of the most expensive music videos of all time, with a production cost of over $1,000,000.

Speaking about the video to Us Weekly, director Hype Williams said "We wanted it to feel like we were painting a beautiful picture". Jermaine Dupri announced that the music video also would be "the most expensive video of the last three years". The crew "pushed it as far as we could go. "We tried to get a goddess feel", said make-up artist Fran Cooper. Behind the scenes footage and the making of "Call on Me" was documented on an episode of Access Granted before its official premiere on July 26, 2006. The music video is featured on the deluxe edition and iTunes exclusive edition of 20 Y.O.

Following the release of the music video, TMZ reported: "Fans of Janet Jackson are in a fury over the alleged lack of support MTV is showing their first Icon. MTV has yet to premiere or even announce a date of a debut for the singer's latest video "Call On Me". Fans have flooded the MTV.com message boards with tons of Janet support, but, according to these fans, many posts were deleted by a moderator. There is much speculation over why Janet has been "blacklisted" from MTV airplay, but most fingers point to her 2004 Super Bowl "wardrobe malfunction," which was co-produced by MTV, who was fined by the U.S. Federal Communications Commission for the mishap. Calls to MTV were not immediately returned."

== Live performances ==
To promote the album, Jackson performed the song with Nelly on the Today show on September 29, 2006, along with "Nasty" and "So Excited". She later performed the song on the Rock Witchu Tour in 2008, with Nelly on the screens. Bob Grendon writing for Chicago Tribune said the duet lacked soul. It was also added to the setlist of the 2011 Number Ones, Up Close and Personal tour.

== Cover and samples ==
A cover version of "Call on Me" by 2000's Stars appears in 2007 Wii game Dance Dance Revolution Hottest Party. Girl Talk sampled the song on "Hands in the Air", which appeared on his fourth album Feed the Animals (2008). English electronic duo Disclosure released a remix of "Call on Me" known as the "Disclosure Bootleg" in 2012.

== Track listings ==
Digital download

1. Album mix – 3:30

U.S. promo CD single

1. Radio remix – 4:03
2. Tony Moran extended club remix – 9:22
3. Tony Moran extended dub remix – 9:16
4. Album version – 3:29

U.S. CD single (094636912325)

1. Album mix – 3:29
2. Extended album mix – 5:08
3. Album instrumental – 3:28

French remixes (094638 033851)

1. Waku remix – 3:26
2. Hard mix Bionix – 3:33
3. Smooth mix Bionix – 3:14
4. Junior Caldera house remix – 6:18

Other

1. Lil Jon remix – 3:29
2. Luny Tunes remix – 3:47

UK CD 1 (VUSCD)

1. Album mix – 3:29
2. Full Phatt radio mix – 3:32

UK CD 2 (VUSDX330)

1. Album mix – 3:29
2. Full Phatt extended remix – 4:18
3. Tony Moran extended club remix – 9:22
4. Album instrumental – 3:28

UK 12" single (VUST 330)

1. Extended album mix – 5:08
2. Album instrumental – 3:28
3. Album a cappella – 3:28
4. Club radio remix – 4:00
5. Full Phatt extended remix – 4:18

U.S. 12" single (7282311)

1. Album mix – 3:29
2. Extended album mix – 5:08
3. Album instrumental – 3:28
4. Album mix – 3:29
5. Extended album mix – 5:08
6. Album a cappella – 3:28

== Charts ==
=== Weekly charts ===
Chart (2006)	Peak position
Australian Club (ARIA)	49
Belgium (Ultratip Bubbling Under Flanders)	2
Belgium (Ultratip Bubbling Under Wallonia)	7
Canada CHR/Pop Top 40 (Radio & Records)	23
Canada CHR/Top 40 (Billboard)	24
European Hot 100 Singles (Billboard)	31
Finland (Suomen virallinen lista)	20
France (SNEP)	41
Germany (Official German Charts)	45
Global Dance Tracks (Billboard)	17
Ireland (IRMA)	20
Italy (FIMI)	7
Netherlands (Dutch Top 40 Tipparade)	13
New Zealand (Recorded Music NZ)	11
Romania (Romanian Top 100)	82
Scotland (OCC)	17
Slovakia (Rádio Top 100)	25
Sweden (Sverigetopplistan)	25
Switzerland (Schweizer Hitparade)	43
UK Singles (Official Charts)	18
UK R&B (OCC)	2
US Billboard Hot 100	25
US Dance Club Songs (Billboard)	2
US Hot R&B/Hip-Hop Songs (Billboard)	1
US Pop Airplay (Billboard)	32
US Pop 100 (Billboard)	33
US Rhythmic (Billboard)	21

=== Year-end charts ===
Chart (2006)	Position
UK Urban (Music Week)	23
US Hot Singles Sales (Billboard)	8
US Hot R&B/Hip-Hop Songs (Billboard)	22
Chart (2007)	Position
Brazil (Crowley Broadcast Analysis)	96

== Certifications ==
Region	Certification	Certified units/sales
Brazil (Pro-Música Brasil)	Gold	30,000^{‡}
New Zealand (RMNZ)	Gold	15,000^{‡}
^{‡} Sales+streaming figures based on certification alone.

== Release history ==
Release dates and formats for "Call on Me"
Region	Date	Format(s)	Label(s)	Ref.
United States	June 19, 2006	Urban contemporary radio	Virgin	
United States	July 18, 2006	Contemporary hit radio; rhythmic contemporary radio	Virgin	
United States	August 15, 2006	12-inch vinyl	Virgin	
Germany	September 1, 2006	CD	EMI	
United States	September 5, 2006	Maxi CD	Virgin	
United Kingdom	September 18, 2006	CD; maxi CD	Virgin	
