= Nasty (Janet Jackson song) =

1986 song by Janet Jackson

- US and European cover

Single by Janet Jackson

from the album Control
- B-side: "You'll Never Find (A Love Like Mine)"
- Released: April 4, 1986
- Recorded: September 1985
- Studio: Flyte Tyme, Minneapolis, Minnesota
- Genre: Dance-pop; R&B; new jack swing
- Length: 4:03
- Label: A&M
- Songwriters: James Harris III; Terry Lewis; Janet Jackson
- Producer: Jimmy Jam and Terry Lewis

Janet Jackson singles chronology
"What Have You Done for Me Lately" (1986)	"Nasty" (1986)	"When I Think of You" (1986)

Audio sample
- file; help

Music video
- "Nasty" directed by Mary Lambert on YouTube

"Nasty" is a song by American singer Janet Jackson from her third studio album, Control (1986). It was released on April 4, 1986, by A&M Records as the album's second single. It is a funk number built with samples and a quirky timpani melody. The single peaked at number three on the US Billboard Hot 100 and number one on the Hot R&B/Hip-Hop Songs chart, and remains one of Jackson's signature songs. The line "My first name ain't baby, it's Janet – Miss Jackson if you're nasty" has been used in pop culture in various forms. According to musicologist Richard J Ripani, Ph. D, the single is one of the earliest examples of new jack swing music.

The song won for Favorite Soul/R&B Single at the 1987 American Music Awards. It ranked number 30 on VH1's 100 Best Songs of the Past 25 Years, number 45 on VH1's 100 Greatest Songs of the 80s, number 79 on Rolling Stone's 100 Greatest Pop Songs, number 11 on Rolling Stone's 200 Best Songs of the 1980s and number six on LA Weekly's Best Pop Songs in Music History by a Female. It has been included in each of Jackson's greatest hits albums: Design of a Decade: 1986–1996 (1995), Number Ones (2009) and Icon: Number Ones (2010).

== Background ==
After arranging a recording contract with A&M Records in 1982 for a then-15-year-old Janet, her father Joseph Jackson oversaw the entire production of her debut album, Janet Jackson, and its follow-up, Dream Street (1984). Jackson was initially reluctant to begin a recording career, explaining, "I was coming off of a TV show that I absolutely hated doing, Fame. I didn't want to do [the first record]. I wanted to go to college. But I did it for my father ..." and elaborated that she was often in conflict with her producers. Amidst her professional struggles, she rebelled against her family's wishes by marrying James DeBarge of the family recording group DeBarge in 1984. The Jacksons disapproved of the relationship, citing DeBarge's immaturity and substance abuse. Jackson left her husband in January 1985 and was granted an annulment later that year.

Jackson subsequently fired her father as her manager and hired John McClain, then A&M Records' senior vice president of artists and repertoire and general manager. Commenting on the decision, she stated, "I just wanted to get out of the house, get out from under my father, which was one of the most difficult things that I had to do, telling him that I didn't want to work with him again." Joseph Jackson resented John McClain for what he saw as an underhanded attempt to steal his daughter's career out from under him. McClain responded by saying "I'm not trying to pimp Janet Jackson or steal her away from her father." He subsequently introduced her to the songwriting and production duo James "Jimmy Jam" Harris III and Terry Lewis, and Jackson and the duo started working on a third studio album for Jackson, titled Control, in Minneapolis. "Nasty" was Jackson's autobiographical account of confronting abusive men. She said,

The danger hit home when a couple of guys started stalking me on the street. They were emotionally abusive. Sexually threatening. Instead of running to Jimmy or Terry for protection, I took a stand. I backed them down. That's how songs like 'Nasty' and 'What Have You Done for Me Lately' were born, out of a sense of self-defense. Control meant not only taking care of myself but living in a much less protected world. And doing that meant growing a tough skin. Getting attitude.

Jimmy Jam built the melody for this song around a sound from his then-new Ensoniq Mirage keyboard: "It [had] a factory sound that was in there... more of a sound-effect type of sound", he recalled. "I've always been – probably from being around Prince – interested in using unorthodox types of things to get melodies and sounds. That was a very unmelodic type of sound, but we found a way to build a melody around it."

In August 1999, Missy Elliott revealed she was working with Jackson on an updated remix for the song; its working title was "Nasty Girl 2000". The following year, Elliott's close friend Aaliyah was added to the track, however due to undisclosed reasons the record was never released.

== Composition ==
"Nasty" is set in common time, in the key of F minor. Jackson's vocals range between approximately E♭_{3} and C_{5}. The song is in a medium dance groove tempo of 100 beats per minute. At the beginning of the song, Jackson shouts, "Give me a beat!". The song is about respect as she tells all her male admirers "better be a gentleman or you'll turn me off". For the Los Angeles Times, Jackson's approach is hard and aggressive in the song.

== Critical reception ==
Billboard's reviewer Steven Ivory called "Nasty" a "hard-funk" song, along with other tracks from Control. Rob Hoerburger from Rolling Stone remarked that "on cuts such as 'Nasty' and the single 'What Have You Done for Me Lately' Janet makes the message clear: She's still basically a nice girl but ready to kick some butt if you try to put her on a pedestal". William Ruhlmann of AllMusic picked the song as one of the album's highlight. Website Scene 360° commented that it was a confident, sassy song and influenced pop music in the following years of its release. Music Week quipped that the song's "drum track alone is enough to give 'Nasty' an R rating."

== Music video ==
The accompanying music video for "Nasty" was directed by Mary Lambert and choreographed by Paula Abdul, who also made a cameo. Abdul won an MTV Video Music Award for Best Choreography.

== Live performances ==
Jackson sang "Nasty" live at the 1987 Grammy Awards, wearing an all-black outfit, along with Jam and Lewis and dancers. She also has performed the song on all of her tours. It was first performed on the Rhythm Nation Tour in 1990. On the Janet World Tour which happened in 1993 and continued throughout the two following years, the song was the second to be performed along with "Nasty", with the singer wearing gold jewelry. The song was performed during a "frenzied" medley with "What Have You Done for Me Lately" and "The Pleasure Principle" on The Velvet Rope Tour in 1998. The medley at the October 11, 1998, show at the Madison Square Garden in New York City was broadcast during a special titled The Velvet Rope: Live in Madison Square Garden by HBO. It was also added to the setlist at its DVD release, The Velvet Rope Tour: Live in Concert in 1999. During the All for You Tour in 2001 and 2002, "Nasty" was performed in a re-worked version, during a medley with "Control" and "What Have You Done for Me Lately". According to Denise Sheppard from Rolling Stone, it was "another crowd favorite; perhaps best dubbed as the 'bitter' portion of the night", also adding that "this performer - who has been performing onstage for twenty-eight years - knows what the crowd comes for and gives it to them in spades". The February 16, 2002 final date of the tour at the Aloha Stadium in Hawaii, was broadcast by HBO, and included a performance of it. This rendition was also added to the setlist at its DVD release, Janet: Live in Hawaii, in 2002.

On September 9, 2006, Jackson went to France to perform "Nasty" and new single "So Excited" at NRJ's Back to School concert, as part of promotion for her ninth studio album 20 Y.O.. While on The Oprah Winfrey Show, she was interviewed and performed both tracks again. The show aired on September 25, a day before 20 Y.O.'s release in the United States. A few days later, the singer performed on Today's Toyota Concert Series in Rockefeller Center, in New York City, to promote 20 Y.O. The setlist also included "So Excited" and "Call on Me". For her first tour in six years, titled Rock Witchu Tour, Jackson performed "Nasty" as part of it. Jackson made a surprise appearance on the ninth-season finale of American Idol in 2010 to perform a medley of "Nothing" and "Nasty" after joining the contestants to perform a rendition of her hit ballad "Again". She also sang it at Essence Music Festival in New Orleans, in July 2010, which she headlined. It was also performed during her Number Ones: Up Close and Personal tour in 2011. John Soeder from Cleveland.com commented, "Yet the emphasis was on high-energy dance numbers, including 'Miss You Much,' 'Nasty,' 'When I Think of You' and other infectious blasts from the past, complete with pneumatic grooves and icy synthesizers. The net effect was akin to squeezing into an old pair of acid-washed jeans." It was also included on her 2015–2016 Unbreakable World Tour as the second song on the set list and as well on her current 2017-2019 State of the World Tour, it is the fourth song on the setlist. Jackson included the song at her 2019 Las Vegas residence Janet Jackson: Metamorphosis. It was also included on her special concert series "Janet Jackson: A Special 30th Anniversary Celebration of Rhythm Nation" in 2019.In 2023 Jackson performed the song on her Janet Jackson: Together Again tour.

== Legacy ==
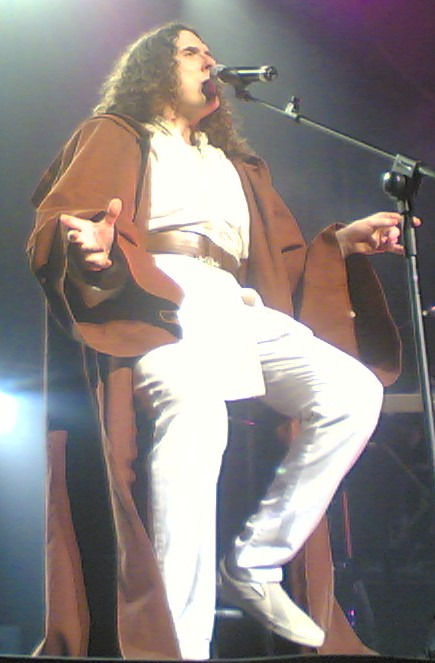
"Weird Al" Yankovic (pictured) included his cover of "Nasty" on his medley "Polka Party!" in 1986.

In 1986, "Weird Al" Yankovic included the song in his polka medley "Polka Party!" from his album of the same name.

Britney Spears has paid homage to "Nasty" multiple times throughout her career; she performed live covers of "Nasty" and "Black Cat" on the "Baby One More Time Tour". She also yelled "Stop!" in the single version of "(You Drive Me) Crazy", paying homage to Janet saying "Stop!" in the "Nasty" music video. The single version of the song, titled "The Stop! Remix", also references "Nasty". The chair routine in the song's music video pays homage to Jackson's "Miss You Much" video. Additionally, her single "Boys", released as the fourth single from her Britney album, references "Nasty" in the line "get nasty", with the song being described as "cut-rate '80s Janet Jackson" by Entertainment Weekly. Spears also pays homage to the song in "Break the Ice", released as the third single from her fifth studio album Blackout, in the line "I like this part", which references Janet saying "I love this part" in "Nasty". Spears' official site said she was "stopping the song à la Janet Jackson to say, "I like this part. It feels kind of good." The opening scene of her "Ooh La La" video also pays homage to Jackson's "Nasty" video, with MSN Music saying, "The clip plays out like a more kid-friendly version of Janet Jackson's "Nasty" video, with Spears and her kids taking in a movie when mom is suddenly transported into the on-screen action."

After Donald Trump referred to Hillary Clinton as "such a nasty woman" during the third Presidential debate of the 2016 US election cycle, the song rose up 250% as reported by streaming platform Spotify.

== Track listings ==
- US, UK, and European 7-inch single

A. "Nasty" (Edit of Remix) – 3:40
B. "You'll Never Find (A Love Like Mine)" – 4:08

- US and European 12-inch single / Australian limited-edition 12-inch single

A1. "Nasty" (Extended) – 6:00
B1. "Nasty" (Instrumental) – 4:00
B2. "Nasty" (A Cappella) – 2:55

- US and European 12-inch single – Cool Summer Mix Parts I and II

A. "Nasty" (Cool Summer Mix Part I) – 7:57
B. "Nasty" (Cool Summer Mix Part II) – 10:09

- UK 12-inch single

A1. "Nasty" (Extended) – 6:00
B1. "Nasty" (Instrumental) – 4:00
B2. "You'll Never Find (A Love Like Mine)" – 4:08

== Personnel ==
- Janet Jackson – vocals, background vocals, keyboards
- Jerome Benton – vocals
- Jimmy Jam – keyboards, percussion, piano, drums, vocals
- Jellybean Johnson – vocals
- Terry Lewis – percussion, vocals

== Accolades ==
Organization	Country	Accolade	Year	Source
VH1	United States	100 Greatest Songs of the Past 25 Years	2003	
VH1	United States	100 Greatest Songs of the 80s	2006	
Rolling Stone	United States	100 Greatest Pop Songs		
Rolling Stone	United States	The 200 Best Songs of the 1980s	2023	

== Charts ==
=== Weekly charts ===
Chart (1986)	Peak position
Australia (Kent Music Report)	17
Austria (Ö3 Austria Top 40)	21
Belgium (Ultratop 50 Flanders)	4
Bolivia (UPI)	6
Canada Top Singles (RPM)	8
Canada Retail Singles (The Record)	3
El Salvador (AP)	8
Europe (European Hot 100 Singles)	22
Finland (Suomen virallinen lista)	17
Ireland (IRMA)	20
Luxembourg (Radio Luxembourg)	11
Netherlands (Dutch Top 40)	5
Netherlands (Single Top 100)	5
New Zealand (Recorded Music NZ)	8
Switzerland (Schweizer Hitparade)	8
UK Singles (Official Charts)	19
US Billboard Hot 100	3
US Dance Club Songs (Billboard)	2
US Dance Singles Sales (Billboard)	6
US Hot R&B/Hip-Hop Songs (Billboard)	1
US Cash Box Top 100	3
West Germany (GfK)	9

=== Year-end charts ===
Chart (1986)	Position
Belgium (Ultratop 50 Flanders)	57
Canada Top Singles (RPM)	66
Netherlands (Dutch Top 40)	46
Netherlands (Single Top 100)	44
US Billboard Hot 100	58
US Dance Club Songs (Billboard)	23
US Dance Singles Sales (Billboard)	23
US Hot R&B/Hip-Hop Songs (Billboard)	5
US Cash Box Top 100	48

== Certifications ==
Region	Certification	Certified units/sales
Canada (Music Canada)	Gold	50,000^{^}
United States (RIAA)	Platinum	1,000,000^{‡}
^{^} Shipments figures based on certification alone.^{‡} Sales+streaming figures based on certification alone.

== See also ==
- List of number-one R&B singles of 1986 (U.S.)
- Nasty woman meme
