= Hype Hair =

- CEO: Lia Dias
- Categories: Beauty magazine
- Founded: 1992
- Country: United States
- Based in: Los Angeles, CA
- Language: English
- Website: www.hypehair.com

Hype Hair is one of the longest-running hair and beauty publications with a daily news site focused on African-American hair, style and beauty. The magazine features articles and photographs on hairstyles and beauty products for Black women. It also features interviews and profiles on celebrities from the music, TV and movie world. There is also an official website which claims to be “The number one source for Black hair, style and beauty news.” It was formerly published on a monthly basis. The magazine is published nine times per year.

Hype Hair was founded in 1992, led by editor-in-chief Belinda Trotter who created the concept and many of the features that are still included in the magazine while working as editor-in-chief for 2 Hype fanzine under the Word Up! publication house. The section on hairstyles of celebrities caught the attention of publisher Scott Figman who agreed a magazine featuring hairstyles should be published.

A few years later, Adrienne Moore was named editor-in-chief, serving more than 20 years before being promoted to publisher. In 2013, Hype Hair was acquired by Uptown Ventures and was later sold in 2017 to a private company.

In 2021, Lia Dias, owner of The Girl Cave LA beauty supply store chain, purchased the magazine for an undisclosed sum.
