= Khia =

American rapper and record producer (born 1976)

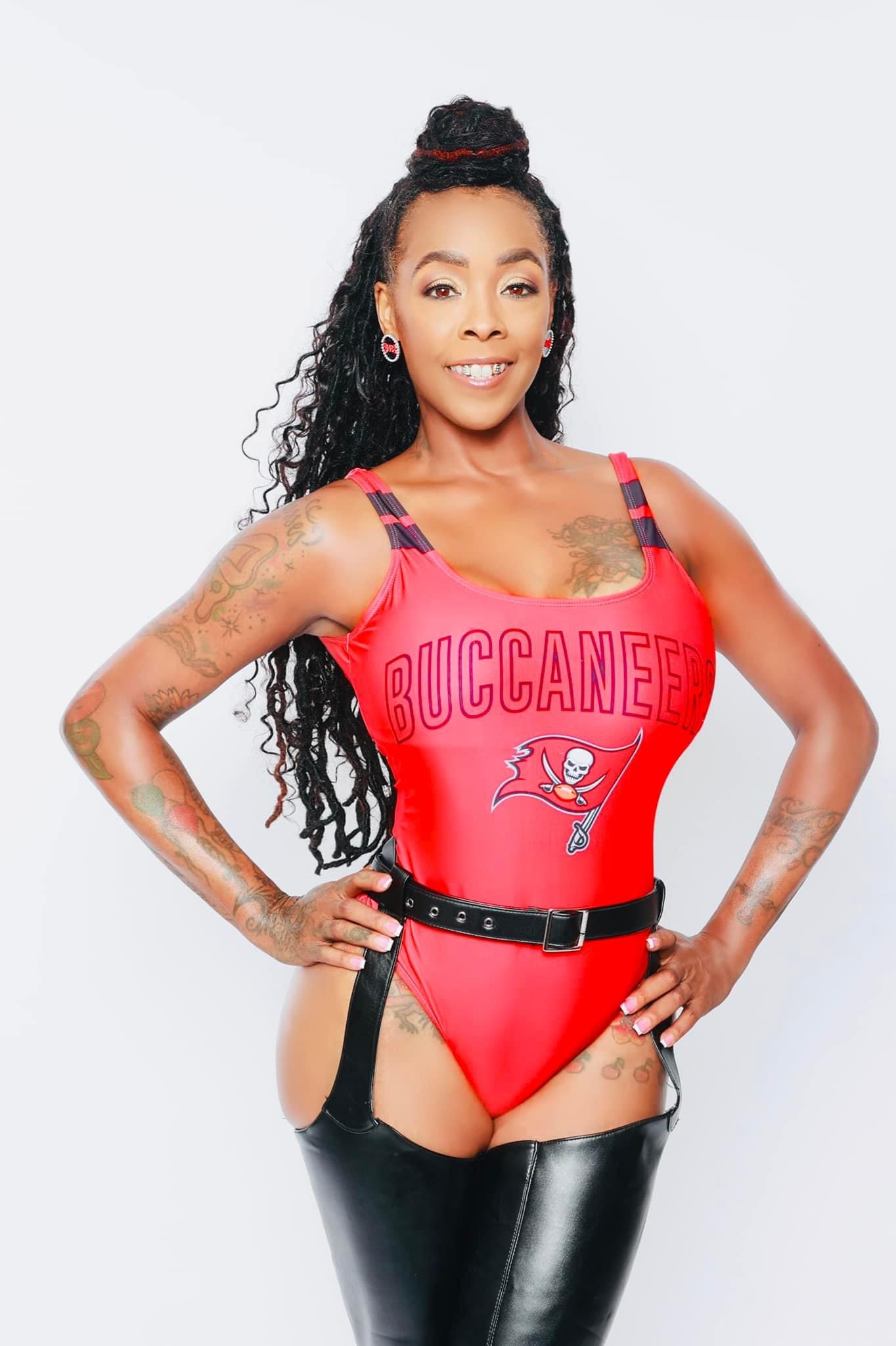
- Khia in 2024

Background information
- Born: Khia Shamone Chambers; November 8, 1976 (age 49); Philadelphia, Pennsylvania, U.S.
- Origin: Tampa, Florida, U.S.
- Genres: Hip-hop; gangsta rap; Southern hip-hop
- Occupations: Rapper; singer; songwriter; record producer; media personality
- Instruments: Vocals
- Years active: 2000–present
- Labels: Dirty Down; Epic; Phase One; Big Cat; TME; Artemis
- Children: 2

Khia Shamone Finch (/ˈkaɪə/ KY-ə; née Chambers; born November 8, 1976) is an American rapper and record producer. She is known for her single, "My Neck, My Back (Lick It)."

== Early life ==
Khia was born Khia Shamone Chambers in Philadelphia, Pennsylvania, and was raised in its Germantown neighborhood. She moved to Tampa, Florida, when she was 11. Khia attended Dowdell Middle School and Hillsborough High School. She left school sophomore year after she got pregnant. In 1991, Khia had her first child, a daughter also named Khia. In 1992, she moved to Honolulu, Hawaii, when her father was stationed there and had her second child, a son named Rashawn, while she was living with him. Before becoming a rapper, she worked as a bartender at Club XS in Tampa. Her mother, Carol Belinda Chambers, who was a data-entry specialist, died in 2001.

== Career ==
=== 2000–2003: Thug Misses ===
Khia released her debut album, Thug Misses, in 2002 on Dirty Down/Artemis Records as a re-release from the original version by Divine Records. The lead single "My Neck, My Back (Lick It)" became a breakthrough single, charting at #42 on the Hot 100 chart and #12 on the Hot Rap Tracks chart. MTV News reported that she wrote "My Neck, My Back" in 15 minutes.

=== 2004–2012: Gangstress, Nasti Muzik and MotorMouf aka Khia Shamone ===
In 2004, Khia appeared on a track with Trick Daddy and Tampa Tony called "J.O.D.D. (Jump On Da Dick)" from Trick's album Thug Matrimony: Married to the Streets. Khia's second album was supposed to be released in 2003 with the title "Street Preacher". The album was complete by mid-2003 and was set for release by the end of 2003, but the album got shelved for unknown reasons. In 2006 Khia recorded another album to be her second album, Gangstress.

Khia's second album, Gangstress, was released on July 11, 2006, on Phase One Communications. It debuted at #67 on the Billboard R&B chart. Later in 2006, Khia also collaborated with Janet Jackson on her hit "So Excited", which peaked at #90 on the Hot 100 and #1 on the Hot Dance Club Play chart.

After signing with Big Cat Records, and still with her own label, Thug Misses Entertainment, Khia finished working on her third studio album, Nasti Muzik, released on July 22, 2008. "What They Do" was the first promotional single on the album, which featured Atlanta rapper Gucci Mane. The first single, "Be Your Lady", was produced by Tampa's Push-a-Key Productions. Khia promoted the upcoming album by releasing a mixtape entitled The Boss Lady, which was hosted by DJ Scream.

Khia participated in the VH1 reality show Miss Rap Supreme in 2008. Khia was eliminated from the competition for rapping a song recorded prior to the show, "Respect Me".

Khia began working on her fourth album, MotorMouf aka Khia Shamone, in 2009. On May 4, 2010, she released the lead single from the album, "Been a Bad Girl". A music video for the single was shot in New York by Clifton Bell. The song showed a different, more sensitive side of the rapper. Following its release, Khia stopped by a local ABC News show to promote the single. In 2010, she told the website HipHopDX that the album will feature her singing instead of rapping on some of its cuts. A second single, a smooth R&B song, "So Addicted", followed "Been a Bad Girl". That track was compiled on the Khia Shamone section of the album. She's since released the singles "Pay Your Pussy Bill" and "Georgia" from the album.

=== 2013–present: Love Locs and current activities ===
In 2014, Khia released an album under her own label, titled Love Locs. She would follow this with QueenDomCum in 2016 and Twerkanomics in 2018. From early 2017 to February 2018, Khia and media personality Ts Madison co-hosted The Queens Court, an online talk show and podcast. Following Khia’s abrupt and controversial exit from the series, she announced her own live podcast series Gag Order.

In the mid-2020s, the "Khia Asylum", an internet meme which originated on Stan Twitter, became a term in reference to pop artists perceived to be experiencing a career decline, thus placing 'Khias' in an 'asylum' which they can 'escape' by regaining momentum in music sales and charting. The meme has faced backlash due to the pejorative being applied to primarily female musicians, with critics deeming it "racist", "misogynistic", and "disrespectful" to Khia herself.

== Discography ==
- Thug Misses (2002)
- Gangstress (2006)
- Nasti Muzik (2008)
- MotorMouf aka Khia Shamone (2012)
- Love Locs (2014)
- QueenDomCum (2016)
- TwerkAnomics (2018)

== Books written ==
- Love Yourself Hoe (2014)
- Ignoring the Signs (2014)
