= My Neck, My Back (Lick It) =

2002 single by Khia

Single by Khia

from the album Thug Misses
- Released: April 23, 2002
- Studio: Grooveland, Clearwater, Florida
- Genre: Hip hop; dirty rap
- Length: 3:42
- Label: Artemis
- Songwriters: Khia; Edward Meriwether
- Producers: Michael "Taz" Williams; Plat'num House

Khia singles chronology
"My Neck, My Back (Lick It)" (2002)	"You My Girl" (2002)

Alternative cover
- UK cover

Music video
- "My Neck, My Back (Lick It)" on YouTube

"My Neck, My Back (Lick It)" is a song by American rapper Khia, released on April 23, 2002 as the lead single from her debut studio album, Thug Misses. Owing to its sexually explicit lyrics, an edited version of the song was released to mainstream radio. The song reached number 42 on the US Billboard Hot 100. It also reached number four in the United Kingdom two years later, number 10 in Greece, and number 12 in Australia. Lyrically, “My Neck, My Back (Lick It)” is about a woman searching for and pursuing a man at a club, demanding that he perform sexual acts on her, including cunnilingus and anilingus, and encouraging other women to do the same.

== Background and meaning ==
The lyrics contain detailed, explicit descriptions of both cunnilingus and anilingus, so a heavily edited version was used for radio broadcasting and the official music video. Khia later stated in a 2002 interview for MTV News concerning the song's big success: "I guess the world is just nasty and freaky like that […] It's not even my favorite song, and I was kind of surprised that's the song that everybody jumped on. … That song is just nothing compared to my other music. It's like, 'That's what the world is about today,' so hey, it works for me."

In 2018, NPR ranked the song as #184 for their The 200 Greatest Songs By 21st Century Women list, saying: "'My Neck, My Back' is the most enduring erotic pleasure procedural of this era, and rightfully so. Underscoring the dirty in Dirty South, Khia raps simple demands as to where she wants to be licked (short version: 'all over'), with explicit suggestions towards technique that span two dedicated verses. It's a delightfully nasty club classic where a woman's pleasure is presented as a debt owed her."

== Recording and composition ==
"My Neck, My Back (Lick It)" is a dirty rap song, and India Mae Alby of Keakie.com described it as a "low beat Club song". The song is noted for its chorus, in which Khia raps "My neck, my back, lick my pussy and my crack". The song was written by Khia herself and Edward Meriwether. During a studio session, Khia recorded "My Neck, My Back" at Grooveland Studios in Clearwater, Florida.

== Music video ==
=== Background ===
The music video was directed by Diane Martel, and was released during the spring of 2002. In the United Kingdom, a different video was used, which did not feature Khia, instead depicting a group of bikini-clad models washing a Hummer H2 in a seductive manner while lip-synching the words to the song.

=== Synopsis ===
The music video begins with Khia dancing in a half-bikini dress at a party in front of various people full of arcade games. It later shows scenes of Khia at a pool receiving a massage by a dreadheaded man. Khia is also seen dancing at a barbecue. There are also scenes showing Khia in a house wearing a polka-dot shirt and heels surrounded by men. Khia can also be seen sitting on a bed in the same look she had on in the beginning of the video right next to many other various people.

== Remixes and freestyles ==
The official remix of the song, the "Roc-A-Fella Remix", features rapper Memphis Bleek. The remix was released as a clean version.

Saweetie did a freestyle of the song titled "Icy Grl". The song was released on her SoundCloud in the summer of 2017 and later released a music video for it in October of the same year. The visual, which went viral on the Internet, would go on to accrue 104 million views on YouTube as of August 2020.

== Usage in media ==
In 2015, American pop singer Miley Cyrus performed a cover of the song at the Adult Swim's New York City upfront party. The performance later caught the attention of Khia herself, who praised the singer-songwriter for performing the song.

American singer-songwriter Elle King covered the song in a country-like style.

The song is featured prominently and sampled in the Girl Talk song "Non-Stop Party Now" off the album Unstoppable.

Richard Cheese and Lounge Against the Machine did a lounge/swing styled cover of the song on their 2010 album OK Bartender.

In 2024, a modified version of the song was used in a commercial for Dove Whole Body Deodorant. Several women are dancing to the song and demonstrating areas where the deodorant can be used.

== Track listings ==
- UK CD 1
1. "My Neck, My Back (Lick It)" (Clean Radio Edit) – 3:20
2. "My Neck, My Back (Lick It)" (Kardinal Beats Clean Radio Edit) – 3:02
- UK CD 2
1. "My Neck, My Back (Lick It)" (Clean Radio Edit) – 3:20
2. "My Neck, My Back (Lick It)" (Kardinal Beats Clean Radio Edit) – 3:02
3. "My Neck, My Back (Lick It)" (Tom Neville X-Rated Mix) – 7:22
4. "My Neck, My Back (Lick It)" (FNP Remix) – 6:52
5. "My Neck, My Back (Lick It)" (Kardinal Beats Dirty Club Mix) – 3:24
6. "My Neck, My Back (Lick It)" (Street/Club Version) – 3:43
7. "My Neck, My Back (Lick It)" (Video)
- UK 12-inch single

A1. "My Neck, My Back (Lick It)" (Kardinal Beats Dirty Club Mix) – 3:24
A2. "My Neck, My Back (Lick It)" (Friday Night Posse Remix) – 6:52
B1. "My Neck, My Back (Lick It)" (Street/Club Version) – 3:43
B2. "My Neck, My Back (Lick It)" (Tom Neville X-Rated Mix) – 7:22

== Charts ==
=== Weekly charts ===
Chart (2002–2004)	Peak position
Australia (ARIA)	12
Australian Urban (ARIA)	7
Belgium (Ultratip Bubbling Under Flanders)	4
Canada (Nielsen SoundScan)	30
Europe (European Hot 100 Singles)	10
Germany (GfK)	29
Greece (IFPI)	10
Ireland (IRMA)	20
Netherlands (Dutch Top 40)	40
Netherlands (Single Top 100)	28
Scottish Singles Sales (Official Charts)	8
UK Singles (Official Charts)	4
UK Dance (Official Charts)	2
US Billboard Hot 100	42
US Hot R&B/Hip-Hop Songs (Billboard)	20
US Hot Rap Songs (Billboard)	12
US Pop Airplay (Billboard)	36
US Rhythmic Airplay (Billboard)	14

=== Year-end charts ===
Chart (2002)	Position
Australia (ARIA)	79
US Hot R&B/Hip-Hop Songs (Billboard)	99

Chart (2003)	Position
Australia (ARIA)	58

Chart (2004)	Position
UK Singles (Official Charts Company)	41

== Certifications ==
Region	Certification	Certified units/sales
Australia (ARIA)	Gold	35,000^{^}
New Zealand (RMNZ)	Gold	15,000^{‡}
United Kingdom (BPI)	Silver	200,000^{‡}
^{^} Shipments figures based on certification alone.^{‡} Sales+streaming figures based on certification alone.
