= Thug Misses =

Studio album by Khia
- Released: October 30, 2001
- Recorded: 2001–2002
- Studio: Grooveland (Clearwater, Florida)
- Genre: Dirty rap; Southern hip hop; hardcore hip hop
- Length: 43:54
- Label: Dirty Down; Artemis
- Producer: Khia; Platinum House; Don Juan

Khia chronology
Thug Misses (2001)	Gangstress (2006)

Singles from Thug Misses
- 1. "My Neck, My Back (Lick It)" Released: April 23, 2002; 2. "The K-Wang" Released: February 23, 2003

Professional ratings
Review scores
Source	Rating
AllMusic	3/5 stars
HipHopDX	3/5 stars
RapReviews	4/10
Rolling Stone	3/5 stars

Thug Misses is the debut studio album by American rapper Khia. It was originally released on October 30, 2001 by Divine Records, followed by a wider release on April 23, 2002, by Dirty Down Records and Artemis Records. The album spawned the singles "My Neck, My Back (Lick It)" and "The K-Wang". Thug Misses was certified gold by the Recording Industry Association of America (RIAA) on September 20, 2002, and as of June 2007, it had sold 611,000 copies in the United States.

== Background ==
Recording for the album began in 2000 when Khia was signed to Divine Records; the album was originally released on April 23, 2002. However, Khia was displeased with the lack of promotion and proper charting performance, resulting in disputes between Khia and the record label executives (also resulting into Khia leaving the record label). The dispute would later develop over Khia's image and the lead single, "My Neck, My Back (Lick It)."

By the end of March 2002, Khia and her newly signed record label, Artemis, released "My Neck, My Back (Lick It)" as the official lead single; the song would go on to peak at number 42 on Billboard Hot 100 and number 20 on Billboard Hot R&B/Hip-Hop Songs and eventually being certified platinum in the US, making it Khia's most successful single to date. Khia and Artemis, later re-released "Thug Misses" as her official debut album. The album reached number 33 on the Billboard 200 and number 13 on Billboard's Top R&B/Hip-Hop Albums chart.

== Release and reception ==
The album was released on April 23, 2002, to generally mixed reviews. David Jeffries of AllMusic gave the album 3/5 stars. He stated: "Khia's stuck-in-the-ghetto attitude is playful, honest, and endearing and carries her throughout the album, especially during the plentiful filler. Stripclub DJs and freaks of the night should track it down". Steve 'Flash' Juon of RapReviews later criticized the album, saying "In the end (no pun intended) Khia will definitely open eyes and turn heads with her debut album "Thug Misses" but doesn't have the music or the lyrics to carry forty-five plus minutes of rap on one album at this early point in her career. By combining her already confidant raps with some more divergent topics and an improved selection of beats, Khia may prove to have the staying power of her femme fatale contemporaries, but until then her debut album will have already taken up twelve of her fifteen minutes of fame. It's up to her to push the clock back and keep it ticking."

== Singles ==
"My Neck, My Back (Lick It)" was released on March 30, 2002, as the lead single from the album. The song was produced by Michael "Taz" Williams and Plat'num House. To date, "My Neck, My Back (Lick It)" remains as Khia's most successful single as a leading artist.

"The K-Wang" was released on February 23, 2003, as the second and final single. An official single remix was produced by Jermaine Dupri. In 2022 Khia released the video to the song.

== Track listing ==
Thug Misses – Standard edition (2001)
No.	Title	Length
1.	"Hater (Skit)"	0:29
2.	"F**k Dem Other Hoes" (featuring DSD)	3:54
3.	"Remember Me"	4:40
4.	"Jealous Girls"	2:59
5.	"Taz (Skit)"	0:42
6.	"Don't Trust No N***a" (featuring DSD)	4:20
7.	"Taz II (Skit)"	0:55
8.	"We Were Meant to Be"	4:34
9.	"Lick My Neck, My Back"	3:42
10.	"Scooter (Skit)"	0:09
11.	"K-Wang" (featuring DSD)	5:11
12.	"I Know You Want It"	2:55
13.	"Poem (For My King)"	1:17
14.	"When I Meet My King"	3:31
15.	"You My Girl" (featuring Markus Vance)	4:28

Thug Misses – Reissue (2002)
No.	Title	Length
1.	"My Neck, My Back (Lick It)"	3:42
2.	"Hater (Skit)"	0:29
3.	"F**k Dem Other Hoes" (featuring DSD)	3:54
4.	"The K-Wang" (featuring DSD)	5:11
5.	"You My Girl" (featuring Markus Vance)	4:28
6.	"Jealous Girls"	2:59
7.	"Taz (Skit)"	0:42
8.	"Don't Trust No N****z" (featuring DSD)	4:20
9.	"Taz II (Skit)"	0:55
10.	"Remember Me"	4:40
11.	"Scooter (Skit)"	0:09
12.	"F**k Dem F**k N****s" (featuring DSD)	3:28
13.	"I Know You Want It"	2:55
14.	"We Were Meant to Be"	4:34
15.	"For My King (Tribute to the Black Man)"	1:17
16.	"When I Meet My King"	3:31

Thug Misses – Digitally remastered edition (bonus tracks)
No.	Title	Length
17.	"My Neck, My Back (Lick It)" (Street/Club Version)	3:41
18.	"My Neck, My Back (Lick It)" (Tom Neville X-Rated Mix)	7:18

== Personnel ==
Credits for Thug Misses adapted from Allmusic.

- Khia Chambers - Primary Artist, Composer
- Markus Vance - Primary Artist, Composer, Featured Artist
- Max "Oak" McCloughan - Executive Producer
- ESQ. - Executive Producer
- G. Love - Executive Producer
- Shadow Harris - Executive Producer
- Steve E. Machat - Executive Producer
- Don Juan - Producer
- Platinum House - Producer
- Count Basie - Composer
- DSD - Featured Artist
- Lewis T. Bryant Jr. - Engineer
- Mert Deezine - Cover Design

== Charts ==
=== Weekly charts ===
Chart (2002)	Peak position
US Billboard 200	33
US Independent Albums (Billboard)	1
US Top R&B/Hip-Hop Albums (Billboard)	13

=== Year-end charts ===
Chart (2002)	Position
US Billboard 200	192
US Independent Albums (Billboard)	3
US Top R&B/Hip-Hop Albums (Billboard)	79

== Certifications ==
Region	Certification	Certified units/sales
United States (RIAA)	Gold	611,000

== Release history ==
Region	Date	Format	Label	Catalogue
United States	October 30, 2001	CD	Divine	45
United States	April 23, 2002	CD	Dirty Down, Artemis	751132
Australia	October 11, 2002	CD	Epic, Dirty Down, Divine, Sony	5086242000
United Kingdom	November 18, 2002	CD	Dirty Down, Epic, Sony	5086242
