= So Excited (Janet Jackson song) =

2006 single by Janet Jackson

Single by Janet Jackson featuring Khia

from the album 20 Y.O.
- B-side: "Call on Me"
- Released: October 10, 2006
- Recorded: 2006
- Studio: Flyte Tyme (Santa Monica)
- Genre: Hip hop; dance-pop; R&B
- Length: 3:16
- Label: Virgin
- Songwriters: Janet Jackson; Jermaine Dupri; James Phillips; Johntá Austin; James Harris III, Terry Lewis; Khia Chambers; Herbie Hancock; Michael Beinhorn; Bill Laswell
- Producers: Jermaine Dupri; LRoc; Jimmy Jam and Terry Lewis; Janet Jackson

Janet Jackson singles chronology
"Call on Me" (2006)	"So Excited" (2006)	"With U" (2006)

Khia singles chronology
"Snatch the Cat Back" (2006)	"So Excited" (2006)	"What They Do" (2008)

Music video
- "So Excited" on YouTube

"So Excited" is a song recorded by American singer Janet Jackson, featuring guest vocals from rapper Khia, for Jackson's ninth studio album 20 Y.O. (2006). The song was written by Jackson, Jermaine Dupri, James Phillips, Johntá Austin, James Harris III, Terry Lewis and Khia Chambers, with Herbie Hancock, Michael Beinhorn and Bill Laswell also receiving songwriting credits for sampling Hancock's 1983 song "Rockit". Production for "So Excited" was handled by Dupri, LRoc, Jam, Lewis and Jackson. "So Excited" is musically a hip hop and dance song which lyrically expresses submission from a woman to her lover. It was released as the second single from 20 Y.O. on October 10, 2006, by Virgin Records.

It received mixed reviews from music critics, with some considering the song the highlight from 20 Y.O. while others found it disappointing. "So Excited" performed poorly on the US Billboard Hot 100, reaching number 90, but managed to become Jackson's 17th number-one dance hit in the country. It was a moderate success in Europe, reaching the top ten in Finland and top 40 in selected regions. The music video for the song, directed by Joseph Kahn, depicts Jackson's clothes disappearing through a complex dance routine. After Khia was given a minor role in the music video, she criticized Jackson online. Jackson performed the song on Today, the 2006 Billboard Music Awards, and the 2008 Rock Witchu Tour.

== Background and composition ==
"So Excited"
3mins 12 seconds song's chorus.

In 2005, Jackson started working on her ninth studio album, 20 Y.O., with her then partner, record producer Jermaine Dupri, who was commissioned as the executive producer. The discussion between the producers turned to how Jackson was feeling at the time her third studio album Control (1986) was recorded. "I started asking questions like, 'What was the feeling of life when you were 20?' I was so intrigued with what was going on in her life then that I just thought her album should be called that", Dupri commented. Jackson wanted to maintain a R&B sound from her most recent albums, but with an emphasis on dance music. In June 2006, rapper Khia was confirmed on a song titled "So Excited". However producer Dupri said she would be not rapping on the track,

"Khia's on the record because I'm a producer and I heard a sound that I wanted. She don't actually rap on the record, I'm giving you the exclusive. It’s something that I did with her voice. I mean, a lot or people who hear it, they might not even realize that it's her. I use textures when I do records and I just wanted her voice texture on this record, and she really made this song. Now she's been complaining saying she's been taken off the record, I don't know where that came from. She's really foolish to be out here talking [like this]. I'm still gonna keep her on the song because she ain't know what she was doing".

"So Excited" was written by Jackson, Jermaine Dupri, James Phillips, Johntá Austin, James Harris III, Terry Lewis and Khia Chambers; and was produced by Dupri, LRoc, Jam, Lewis and Jackson. The song is a hip hop and dance track which samples the drum break and turntable scratches from Herbie Hancock's 1983 song "Rockit", with Hancock, Michael Beinhorn and Bill Laswell also receiving writing credits. In "So Excited", Jackson promises submission for her lover, singing, "I'll open my spot for you / Anytime you want me to".

The AV8 Remix featuring Fabolous, Khia, Fatman Scoop and Jermaine Dupri was released in October 2006.

== Critical reception ==
"So Excited" received mixed reviews from music critics. Thomas Inskeep from Stylus Magazine criticized 20 Y.O., but enjoyed the track, calling it a "sticky ear-candy" song. He further commented that the "sexed-up" number carries a "throwaway contribution from Khia to, if not ultimate satisfaction, [gives the listener] at least a half-decent orgasm". Miles Marshall Lewis from The Village Voice was also positive, saying that Dupri "girds 'So Excited' with 'Rockit' scratches, coaching guest-rapper Khia to sound like Da Brat on the naughty hook. Serviceable enough, it's surprisingly the highlight" of the album. Spence D. from IGN felt that "So Excited" was like a "glorious slice of radio ready '80s churban soul" wrapped up and delivered for a current audience.

Glenn Gamboa, writer for Newsday, commented that "So Excited" was a "good indicator of what to expect from the current incarnation of Jackson. It's streetwise, lighthearted and easily digestible". Sasha Frere-Jones, writer from The New Yorker was enthusiastic with the song, calling it a "loud dance tune that is reminiscent of the songs on Control", although she criticized some lyrics. For Don Baiocchi from Blogcritics, the song was not "the flawless dance floor anthem" her fans were hoping for. Chuck Taylor from Billboard called it disappointing, and felt it was bland and lacked innovation. Similarly, Evan Serpick, writing for Rolling Stone, stated, "Almost all of the tunes here (particularly 'So Excited') try to replicate Jackson's early work, with diminishing returns".

== Commercial performance ==
"So Excited" debuted at its peak of number 90 on the US Billboard Hot 100 chart dated October 5, 2006. It debuted on the Hot R&B/Hip-Hop Songs at number 75, eventually peaking at number 34, becoming her 39th top-40 single on the chart. On the Dance Club Songs chart, "So Excited" became Jackson's 22nd consecutive top-ten single and her 17th number-one hit on the chart.

In Belgium, "So Excited" debuted at its peak of number 14 on the Ultratip chart in Flanders, while peaking at number five on Ultratip in Wallonia. In Finland, "So Excited" debuted at its peak of number nine, after which it fell to number 14 and then left the chart in its third week. In Spain, it peaked at number 13.

== Music video ==
As Jackson dances, her clothes quickly disappear during the video for "So Excited".

The accompanying music video for "So Excited" was directed by Joseph Kahn, with choreography done by Gil Duldulao; it premiered on September 13, 2006, on BET's Access Granted. A group called X1FX handled VFX visual effects for the video. In the video, Jackson's clothes disappear through a complex dance routine with her female dancers. Also, occasional skeleton people appear in an X-ray effect, and on the 2 minute mark, Jackson is seen inside a yellow sports car eating a strawberry. The video received positive reviews from critics, who considered it a departure from the video for her previous single, but some scenes were criticized. They were also surprised with Jackson naked in the video, after her Super Bowl XXXVIII halftime show controversy in 2004.

After Khia was given a diminished role in the music video, she went to her MySpace account to say she was not pleased with her scenes being displayed in a TV during the music video, and criticized Jackson. Despite that, Khia said years later that the situation was calmed down, and wrote a song with Jackson in mind. However, she did not regret the feedback she gave the singer, stating, "I don't say anything that I don't mean. I meant every word that I said. People mix the truth with hate, but no I didn't appreciate her putting me on the television. A lot of people blew that out of proportion like, 'Oh my god, Khia's hating on Janet,' but she called me and we were okay. It's just me voicing the situation to my fans".

== Live performances ==
On September 9, 2006, Jackson went to France to perform "So Excited" at NRJ's Back to School concert, along with past single "Nasty" (1986). While on The Oprah Winfrey Show, she was interviewed and performed both tracks again, with this being the first time a performance of "So Excited" was broadcast on television. The show aired on September 25. On December 4, 2006, Jackson opened the 2006 Billboard Music Awards with a medley of past song "The Pleasure Principle" and "So Excited", with "Control" serving as an introduction to the number. She was accompanied by white, black and red-clad dancers. The song was included on the setlist for the Rock Witchu Tour in 2008. She was dressed in a gold and black glam hip hop-inspired track suit, and one gold glove. It was used as an interlude on the Unbreakable World Tour in 2015–2016. "So Excited" was also used as a part of the DJ Intermission for Jackson's State of the World Tour in 2017 and was performed live on the final date of the first leg of the tour. Jackson also included the song on her 2019 Las Vegas Residency Janet Jackson: Metamorphosis.

== Track listings ==
UK CD 1

1. Album Version – 3:19
2. "Call on Me" (Luny Tunes Main Mix) – 3:42

UK CD 2

1. Album Version – 3:19
2. Junior Vasquez Club Mix – 7:17
3. Bimbo Jones Club Mix – 7:13
4. Enhanced Video

US / European promo CD single

1. Album Version – 3:17
2. Radio Edit – 3:16
3. Album Instrumental – 3:15

US 12" promo single

1. Album Version – 3:15
2. Radio Edit – 3:15
3. Album Instrumental – 3:15
4. Album A Cappella – 3:12

US promo CD single

1. Junior Vasquez Club Edit – 7:22
2. Junior Vasquez Dub Edit – 7:13
3. Junior Vasquez Mix Show Edit – 5:10
4. Junior Vasquez Radio Edit – 3:18
5. Bimbo Jones Club Edit – 6:45
6. Bimbo Jones Dub Edit – 6:48
7. Bimbo Jones Radio Edit – 3:10
8. Album Version – 3:14

US 12" single

1. Junior Vasquez Club – 7:17
2. Junior Vasquez Instrumental Dub – 7:13
3. Bimbo Jones Club – 6:45
4. Bimbo Jones Instrumental Dub – 6:48

AV8 Remix featuring:
Fabolous
Khia
Fatman Scoop
Jermaine Dupri

== Credits and personnel ==
- Janet Jackson – vocals, songwriter, producer
- Jermaine Dupri – songwriter, producer, mixing, additional vocals
- James Phillips – songwriter, producer
- Johnta Austin – songwriter
- James Harris III – songwriter, producer, additional music
- Terry Lewis – songwriter, producer, additional music
- Khia Chambers – vocals, songwriter
- Herbie Hancock – songwriter
- Michael Beinhorn – songwriter
- Bill Laswell – songwriter
- Phil Tan – mixing
- Debbie McGee - magician's assistance
- Ian Cross – recording at Flyte Tyme Studios, Santa Barbara, California
- John Horesco IV – engineering at Flyte Tyme Studios, Santa Barbara, California
- Josh Houghkirk – engineer, mixing assistant

Credits adapted from 20 Y.O. album liner notes.

== Charts ==
Weekly chart performance for "So Excited"
Chart (2006)	Peak position
Belgium (Ultratip Bubbling Under Flanders)	5
Belgium (Ultratip Bubbling Under Wallonia)	14
CIS Airplay (TopHit)	58
Finland (Suomen virallinen lista)	9
Global Dance Tracks (Billboard)	25
Italy (FIMI)	37
Spain (Promusicae)	13
US Billboard Hot 100	90
US Dance Club Songs (Billboard)	1
US Hot R&B/Hip-Hop Songs (Billboard)	34
US Pop 100 (Billboard)	93
US Rhythmic (Billboard)	38

== Release history ==
Release dates and formats for "So Excited"
Region	Date	Format(s)	Label(s)	Ref.
United States	October 10, 2006	Rhythmic contemporary radio	Virgin	
United States	October 31, 2006	12-inch vinyl	Virgin	
