= Gangstress =

Studio album by Khia
- Released: July 11, 2006
- Recorded: 2005–2006
- Genre: Southern hip-hop; gangsta rap
- Length: 65:43
- Label: Phase One Communications
- Producer: Khia

Khia chronology
Thug Misses (2001)	Gangstress (2006)	Nasti Muzik (2008)

Singles from Gangstress
- 1. "Snatch the Cat Back" Released: June 20, 2006

Gangstress is the second studio album by American rapper Khia. It was released on July 11, 2006 via Phase One Communications. Produced entirely by Khia herself, it features a lone guest appearance from JA. It was supported by the single "Snatch the Cat Back". The release party for Gangstress was hosted at BED, a New York City nightclub featuring mattresses scattered around the space.

Debuting at number 67 on the Billboard Top R&B/Hip-Hop Albums chart dated July 29, 2006, the album spent a total of three weeks on the chart, compared to 29 and 20 weeks, respectively, for the two editions of her debut album. It did not enter the Billboard 200, in contrast to Thug Misses, which had peaked within the top 40.

== Critical reception ==
Professional ratings
Review scores
Source	Rating
AllHipHop	2.5/5 stars
AllMusic	2.5/5 stars
RapReviews	6.5/10

Sidik Fofana of AllHipHop was critical of the "heavy monotony" and "perverted nursery rhymes" throughout the album concluding that: "Still, music is music, so Gangstress will fulfill a few appetites. Other than that, a lot of its listeners will be those who are fascinated by how simple a rap CD can sound. AllMusic's David Jeffries critiqued that the album was "a mostly misguided effort", criticizing the needless skits and self-produced "flat beats" throughout the track listing, concluding that: "Fans of the dirtiest street music the South has to offer might get something out of this, but everyone else can ignore her return to the game and the incessant boasting that comes with it." In contrast, Rowald Pruyn of RapReviews was positive towards Khia's "surprisingly good" production talents and critiqued her "street credibility and aggression" help gloss over her lyrical and technical shortcomings.

== Track listing ==
All tracks are written by Khia Chambers.

No.	Title	Length
1.	"Answering Machine"	3:40
2.	"Respect Me"	4:49
3.	"Thugmisses Speaks, Pt. 1"	0:19
4.	"Bitch M F Got Damn"	4:13
5.	"Grandma"	1:00
6.	"Ah Ha"	3:50
7.	"I've Been High"	3:24
8.	"Thugmisses Speaks, Pt. 2"	0:15
9.	"I've Been Called a Bitch"	4:14
10.	"Pop's"	2:11
11.	"Thugmisses Thugniggaz"	4:36
12.	"Sunshine"	1:12
13.	"Fucking Me Tonight"	4:11
14.	"Questions for the Niggaz"	0:39
15.	"Snatch the Cat Back"	4:32
16.	"Insufficient Funds"	1:10
17.	"Bryan Brooks"	2:56
18.	"Hit the Door" (featuring JA)	4:23
19.	"Thugmisses Speaks, Pt. 3"	0:13
20.	"Don't Trust"	4:11
21.	"Thugmisses Speaks, Pt. 4"	0:13
22.	"For the Love of Money"	4:20
23.	"Forgive Me for My Sins"	5:12
Total length:		65:43

DVD
No.	Title	Length
24.	"Khia Live"
25.	"Khia's Photoshoot"
26.	"On the Radio"
27.	"Back to T Town"
28.	"Interview"

== Personnel ==
- Khia Chambers – songwriter, lead and backing vocals, producer
- JA – rapping (track 18)
- John Amos – recording
- Jon Boii Miller – recording
- Michael Minerva – art direction, design
- Pablo Power – photography
- Kyle Christmas – A&R

== Charts ==
Chart (2006)	Peak position
US Top R&B/Hip-Hop Albums (Billboard)	67
