= State of the World =

State of the World may refer to:

- State of the World (book series), published by the Worldwatch Institute
- "State of the World" (song), a 1989 song by Janet Jackson
- State of the World Tour, a 2017–2019 tour by Janet Jackson
- A State of the World, in economics, under which a state price security pays one unit of a currency or a commodity (numeraire)

== See also ==
- World State in Brave New World, the primary setting of Aldous Huxley's 1932 dystopian novel Brave New World
