= Love Will Never Do (Without You) =

1990 single by Janet Jackson

Single by Janet Jackson

from the album Janet Jackson's Rhythm Nation 1814
- Released: October 2, 1990
- Recorded: 1988
- Studio: Flyte Tyme (Minneapolis, Minnesota)
- Genre: Dance
- Length: 5:50 (Album Version); 4:32 (Single Version)
- Label: A&M
- Songwriter: Jimmy Jam and Terry Lewis
- Producers: Jimmy Jam and Terry Lewis; Janet Jackson

Janet Jackson singles chronology
"Black Cat" (1990)	"Love Will Never Do (Without You)" (1990)	"State of the World" (1991)

Music video
- "Love Will Never Do (Without You)" on YouTube

"Love Will Never Do (Without You)" is a song by American singer Janet Jackson from her fourth studio album, Janet Jackson's Rhythm Nation 1814 (1989). It was written and produced by Jimmy Jam and Terry Lewis, with additional production by Jackson. A dance song with swing and funk influences, it draws away from the album's socially conscious tones, focusing instead on romance. Originally planned as a duet with a male singer, it has Jackson singing in both a lower and high register. Lyrically, it sees her celebrating a lover, while also reflecting on proving others wrong regarding her relationship. In the United States, it was released as the seventh single from the album on October 2, 1990.

Upon release, it received positive reviews from critics. Some deemed it one of the best songs on Rhythm Nation 1814, while others also lauded Jackson's vocals. In the US, it was the album's fourth single to top the Billboard Hot 100, making it the third female album in chart history to amass this number of number ones. It had a weaker reception overseas; in many European countries it barely managed to crack the top 30. The accompanying music video was directed by American photographer Herb Ritts. It shows Jackson donning a more sensual and womanly attire, cavorting in the desert with models Djimon Hounsou and Antonio Sabàto Jr. Some critics noted that the video marked the moment Jackson began presenting herself in a more provocative manner. At the 1991 MTV Video Music Awards, it won Best Female Video. Jackson has performed the track on most of her concert tours, as well as on her Las Vegas concert residencies.

== Background and recording ==
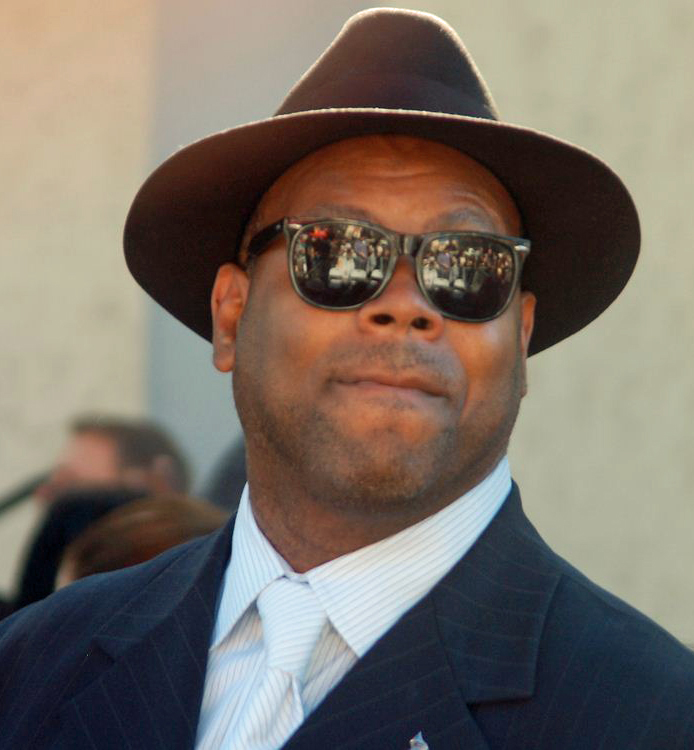
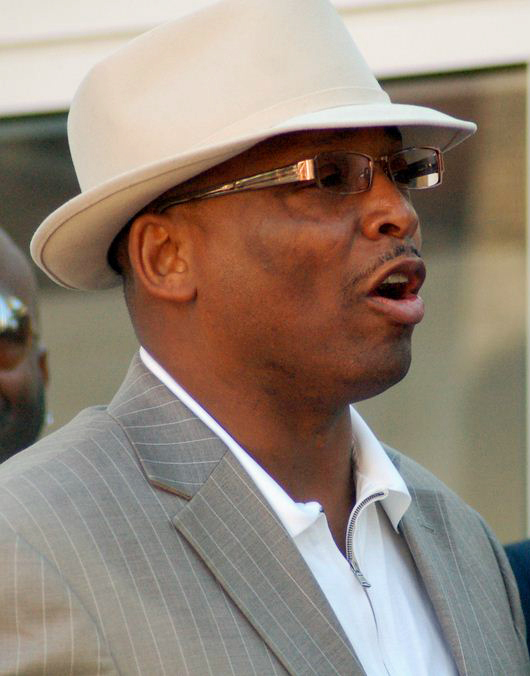
"Love Will Never Do (Without You)" was written and produced by Jimmy Jam (left) and Terry Lewis (right).

Following the critical and commercial breakthrough of her third studio album Control (1986), Janet Jackson became motivated to take a larger role in the creative process of its follow-up. According to music journalist Fred Bronson, A&M Records wanted the singer to record an album similar to Control, something she strongly opposed. She wanted to do something "that I really believed in and that I really felt strong about". For Janet Jackson's Rhythm Nation 1814 (1989), her fourth studio album, she collaborated with songwriting and production team Jimmy Jam and Terry Lewis —with whom she had worked on Control. Rhythm Nation 1814 focused mostly on social issues —racism, poverty, and substance abuse— in addition to themes of romance.

"Love Will Never Do (Without You)" was written by Jam and Lewis, whilst production was in charge of the duo and Jackson. Originally conceived as a duet with a male singer, Jam thought of artists he and Lewis had worked with at the time ―Prince, Johnny Gill, Ralph Tresvant― but nothing was ever concreted. One of the first songs recorded for Rhythm Nation 1814, sessions took place at the duo's Flyte Tyme Studios in Minneapolis, Minnesota, in late 1988. It was recorded using an SP-1200 drum machine, popular at the time in the hip-hop genre, and an Ensoniq Mirage keyboard. In Bronson's The Billboard Book of Number 1 Hts, Jam explained that Jackson provided most background vocals, which were recorded first. This was done to strengthen her own voice, and so that she would become familiar with the song. The lead vocals came afterwards. "[She] couldn't wait to sing the lead. [...] You can hear that excitement all over [the song]", recalled Jam. The duo tried out different approaches when recording. Jam told Jackson to sing the first verse, "low like some guy would". They liked how this sounded, and kept it on the final version.

== Composition and release ==
"Love Will Never Do (Without You)"
A 28-second sample of "Love Will Never Do (Without You)". Conceived as a duet with a male singer, Jackson firsts sings using a lower tone, which then goes up for the second verse.

Musically, "Love Will Never Do (Without You)" has been noted a dance song with swing and funk influences. Rhythm Nation 1814's sole midtempo song, it shifts away way from the political and social tones, focusing instead on romantic relationships. It is a "simple" love song, with lyrics in which Jackson celebrates her lover while sneakily letting him know she could have anyone she wants. Her vocals span from F_{3} to D♭_{5}. She sings the first verse in a "really low" octave, which goes up on the second verse, sounding like her "usual bubbly self" again. Reflecting on defying others' expectations and finding ways to make a relationship work, she sings: "There's no easy explanation for it/ But whenever there’s a problem/ We always work it out somehow". According to the sheet music published by Alfred Publishing Inc., "Love Will Never Do (Without You)" is set in the time signature of common time with a moderate tempo of 120 beats per minute.

The song begins with the sound of a "soft" synthesizer and "hearbeat" thumbs that echo "Be My Baby" (1963) by the Ronettes. This is followed by a "thunderous" bass-drum, a percussive slap-bass, bells and whistles. Present throughout are "instrumental sweeteners": synthesizers, "ecstatically" funky horn-bursts provided by Herb Alpert, and background vocals chanting the title. Jackson herself whoops, trills, scats and ad-libs little calls and responses. It ends with four overlapping harmonies and lead vocal runs that turn an "average midtempo bop into a euphoric declaration of love", as noted by Billboard's Sal Cinquemani. Official remixes were provided by Shep Pettibone and CJ Mackintosh. In the United States, "Love Will Never Do (Without You)" was released as the final single from Rhythm Nation 1814 on October 2, 1990. Additionally, it was added to Jackson's compilation albums Design of a Decade: 1986–1996 (1995), Number Ones (2009), and Japanese Singles Collection -Greatest Hits (2022).

== Critical reception ==
"Love Will Never Do (Without You)" has received positive reviews, with many critics considering it one of the parent album's finest moments. Jackson's vocals were also singled out for praise. Andy Healy from music website wrote: "Often characterized as having a whispering vocal, here [she] sings with strength and confidence and layers the song in lush backing harmonies that glisten with every passing line". The song was described by a writer of Music & Media magazine as "suspenseful" and "sparsely arranged ". Stereogum's Tom Breihan gave a glowing review: "A glorious and effervescent can't-miss pop song that could easily turn around the chart fortunes of an underperforming album [...] a marvel of production". From Slant Magazine Eric Henderson said it was a "monumental" song that paved the way for Jackson's "impending tease epics" "That's the Way Love Goes" (1993) and "Go Deep" (1998). More critical was Andrew Hirst from the Huddersfield Daily Examiner, who praised the song's "funky charm" but dismissed its "weak" refrain.

It has often been referred to as one of Jackson's best songs. Henderson ―who placed it at number seven on Slant Magazine's ranking― wrote that, "every love song she recorded leading up this one sounds like a schoolyard ditty in comparison". The song came in at number 14 on the ranking created by PopMatters; Peter Piatkowski opined it is a "catchy, genial" song, as well as a "grand" closer to the Rhythm Nation era. "Love Will Never Do (Without You)" is Jackson's third greatest song for The Guardian's Michael Cragg: "[A] slice of pure pop ecstasy [...] if the joyful little melodic lift into the chorus doesn’t make your stomach flip, I’d see a doctor". Despite being released in 1990, the staff of Pitchfork included it on their list of the 200 best songs from the 1980s, at number 27.

== Chart performance ==
On the week of November 17, 1990, "Love Will Never Do (Without You)" debuted on the US Billboard Hot 100 at number 89. On January 2, 1991, the song reached the chart's fourth position. It became Rhythm Nation 1814's seventh top five single, making it at the time the first album to generate this number of top fives, and breaking a record established almost a decade earlier by Janet's brother Michael, who scored seven top tens from his album Thriller (1982). More than two weeks later, the song reached the Hot 100's first spot, overthrowing "Justify My Love" by Madonna.

It was Rhythm Nation 1814's fourth number-one hit, making it the third female album in chart history to amass this number of number ones, the others being Whitney Houston's Whitney (1987) and Paula Abdul's Forever Your Girl (1988). Additionally, the song made the album the first to have singles that topped the Hot 100 during three different calendar years ―"Miss You Much" reached number one in 1989, and "Escapade" and "Black Cat" in 1990. It also marked the first time a seventh commercial single topped the Hot 100, and was Jackson's 13th single in a row to top one or more of Billboard's key singles charts ― the Hot 100, Dance Club Play, Adult Contemporary, and Hot R&B Singles charts. "Love Will Never Do (Without Your)" came in at number 19 on the Hot 100's year-end chart, and was later certified gold by the Recording Industry Association of America (RIAA) for the shipment of 500,000 copies.

The song also reached the top spot of the RPM's 100 Singles chart on the week of February 9, 1991. Elsewhere, it had a lukewarm commercial reception. It debuted and peaked at number 34 on the UK Singles Chart on October 27, 1990, spending a total of six weeks on the chart. "Love Will Never Do (Without You)" reached the 22nd position in Ireland. In the Netherlands, it barely cracked the top 30. The single reached the 94th spot of the Eurochart Hot 100. It fared slightly better in Australia, where it reached the 14th spot of the ARIA Singles Chart.

== Music video ==
=== Background and development ===
Screenshot of Jackson in the music video, sporting a more "sensual, womanly" look.

The black-and-white music video for the song was filmed at a dry lake bed outside Los Angeles, under the direction of American photographer Herb Ritts. In her 2011 book True You, Jackson recalled that years prior to the video, Ritts called her one-day and questioned her about her weight; she was "taken aback" and put off working with him, since at the time was feeling self-conscious about her body. After some time, however, she decided that she was being "overly sensitive", and that she wanted to work with Ritts after all. Described by Ritts as a "departure from her elaborate dance production routines", it shows Jackson in a halter top, tight jeans, sporting a blonde upswept hairdo, looking "fresh, sensual, womanly and vulnerable as she reveals herself to the camera". Jackson's co-stars in the visual are models Djimon Hounsou and Antonio Sabàto Jr. The video uses an alternate mix of the song, which begins with Jackson singing the refrain a capella. Throughout the visual, she embraces and dances with the scantily clad models. "Love Will Never Do (Without You)" can be found on the video compilations The Rhythm Nation Compilation (1990) and Design of a Decade: 1986–1996 (1995). In 2020, Julien's Auctions auctioned the outfit worn by the singer for $25,000.

=== Reception and legacy ===
According to Breihan and Revolt's Sharmaine Johnson, the music video for "Love Will Never Do (Without You)" marked a "turning point in [Jackson's] visual style", as they considered it the first time that she presented herself as a sexual being. The Los Angeles Times' Connie Johnson commented, "forget Michael's little sister, [Janet] is all woman here". Eric Henderson added: "Herb Ritts's iconic music video found the singer emerging from her battle fatigues and production-number pantsuits and into the full bloom of sensual womanhood". For The Boombox's Jacinta Howard, "this is the video where Janet completely morphed from an adorable pop singer, into a bonafide sex symbol". She named it Jackson's tenth most "iconic" video. Patrick Demarco of Philadelphia ranked it as the singer's fifth sexiest video. One negative review came from the Los Angeles Times, where Chris Willman was critical of the numerous close-ups of Jackson's navel, which he felt turned her into "anytart USA". Additionally, he felt the video was too similar to Madonna's "Cherish" (1989), also shot in black-and-white and directed by Ritts.

The video was subject of discussion at a November 9, 1990, Black Entertainment Television debate. Some took offense with the fact that a white model played one of Jackson's love interests, arguing that placing caucasians in a black artist's video seemed to be a "prerequisite for crossover". At the 1991 MTV Video Music Awards, the visual was awarded Best Female Video, and was nominated for Best Choreography and Best Art Direction. In 2002, VH1 included "Love Will Never Do (Without You)" on their list of the 100 greatest music videos. Almost two decades later, MTV named it the 88th greatest music video of all time. Additionally, "Love Will Never Do (Without You)" inspired the videos for Britney Spears' "Don't Let Me Be the Last to Know" (2001) ―also directed by Ritts― and Your Love" (2014) by Nicole Scherzinger.

== Live performances ==
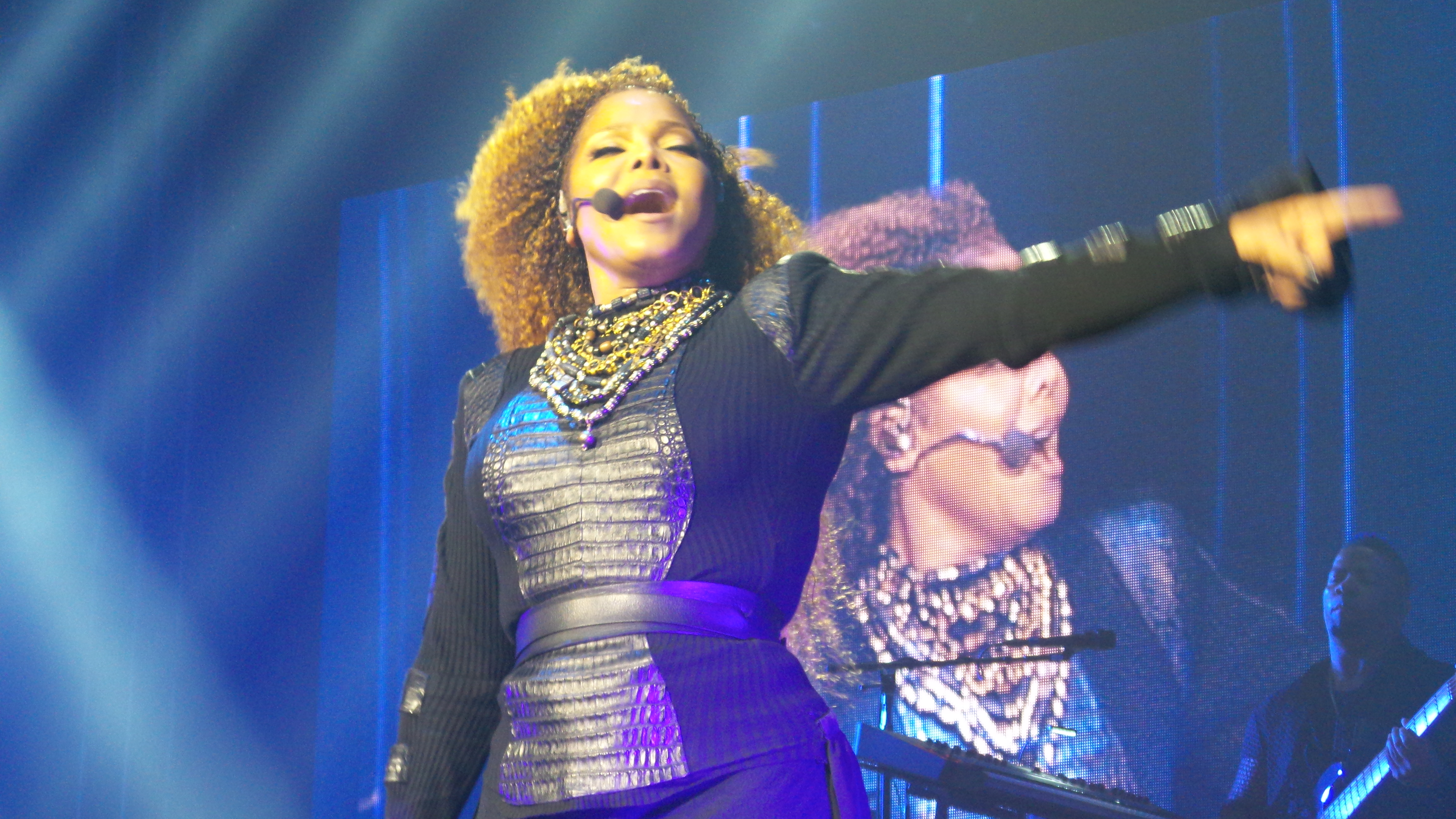
Jackson singing "Love Will Never Do (Without You)" during her 2015–16 Unbreakable World Tour.

Jackson first sang "Love Will Never Do (Without You)" on her Janet World Tour (1993―95). On his review of the concert at Minneapolis' Target Center, the Minnesota Star Tribune's Joe Bream singled out her vocals, even if the rendition was "less sexy than the video". On the Velvet Rope Tour five year later, the song was part of a medley alongside "Escapade", "When I Think of You" (1986), "Miss You Much", and "Runaway" (1995). The number saw Jackson in a jester's headdress and satin bustier, while dancers dressed as flowers, Mad Hatters, and gnomes, "bounded across a blindingly bright, poppy-induced set design of inflatable moons, clocks, vases, and books", as noted by Sean Daly from Rolling Stone. The performance of the song at the October 11, 1998, show at New York City's Madison Square Garden was added to the tour's home video release, The Velvet Rope Tour – Live in Concert (1999).

The single was also performed on 2001―02's All for You Tour. Los Angeles Daily News critic Sandra Barrera observed that the singer, "flashed back to her Marilyn Monroe-esque phase for ['Love Will Never Do (Without You)']". A performance from this tour was added to the video release, Janet: Live in Hawaii (2002). The song was again performed on 2008's Rock Witchu Tour. On her 2011 Number Ones, Up Close and Personal tour, Jackson sang "Love Will Never Do (Without You)" dressed in black jeans and tank top. The Washington Post's Chris Richards said it "managed to keep [its] carefree charms", even though Jackson performed with clenched fists.

A medley of "Feedback" (2008), "All Nite (Don't Stop)" (2004) and "Love Will Never Do (Without You)" was performed on Jackson's Unbreakable World Tour (2015―16). She was dressed in "low-hanging Justin Bieber drop-pants", surrounded by dancers donning "fab hairstyles that were clearly glued/hair-sprayed to death, [matching] [her] impeccable moves", as noted by the Tampa Bay Times' Brittany Volk. The song was included on the "most political section" of Jackson's State of the World Tour (2017―19). From the Columbus Monthly, Erica Thompson pointed out that, "once known for showing off her famously toned physique in revealing attire, [Jackson] kept covered up in black pants and a black, long-sleeved top" "Love Will Never Do (Without You)" was part of the singer's 2019 Las Vegas concert residency, Janet Jackson: Metamorphosis. On her tenth concert tour, Janet Jackson: Together Again (2023―2024), the song's performance saw her being lowered from a raised platform, sporting a black hooded cape and a black shirt emblazoned with the words Rhythm Nation. The music video plays during the song's performance on Jackson's second concert residency, Janet Jackson: Las Vegas (2024―2025). Reviewing the concert, Amber Sampson from Las Vegas Weekly said it's one of the numbers that had "audience members [rasising] to their feet in record time".

== Covers ==
In 1991, Cantonese singer Sally Yeh covered the song as "信自己" (Trust Yourself) for her album Attendance. Ten years later, American singer Macy Gray did a "raspy, breathless, messy" rendition of "Love Will Never Do (Without You)" before Jackson, on the TV special MTV Icon. Swedish band Sahara Hotnights included a cover of the song on their fifth studio album Sparks (2009). AllMusic's Celeste Rhoads singled out the band's "confident take" on the track. In 2017, Carnie Wilson revealed to Billboard that while creating a song for a Trident commercial, as task for The New Celebrity Apprentice, she took inspiration from the song.

== Track listings and formats ==
- US 12-inch vinyl single
1. "Love Will Never Do (Without You)" (Shep's 'Work It Out' mix) – 7:30
2. "Love Will Never Do (Without You)" (The 'Work It Out' dub) – 4:51
3. "Love Will Never Do (Without You)" (U.K. Funky mix) – 6:56
4. "Love Will Never Do (Without You)" (U.K. Funky instrumental) – 6:05
5. "Love Will Never Do (Without You)" (single version) – 4:33
- US 7-inch vinyl single
1. "Love Will Never Do (Without You)" (single version) – 4:33
2. "Love Will Never Do (Without You)" (Work It Out 7-inch with intro) – 4:49
- European 12-inch vinyl single
1. "Love Will Never Do (Without You)" (Shep's 'Work It Out' mix) – 7:30
2. "Love Will Never Do (Without You)" (U.K. Funky mix) – 6:55
3. "Love Will Never Do (Without You)" (The 'Work It Out' dub) – 4:51
- UK CD single
1. "Love Will Never Do (Without You)" (Work It Out 7-inch with intro) – 4:49
2. "Love Will Never Do (Without You)" (Shep's 'Work It Out' mix) – 7:37
3. "Love Will Never Do (Without You)" (U.K. Funky mix) – 6:55
- Digital single ― Remixes
1. "Love Will Never Do (Without You)" (single version) – 4:33
2. "Love Will Never Do (Without You)" (Work It Out 7-inch with intro) – 4:49
3. "Love Will Never Do (Without You)" (U.K. Funky 7-inch) – 4:30
4. "Love Will Never Do (Without You)" (The Love 7-inch) – 4:37
5. "Love Will Never Do (Without You)" (Work It Out 7-inch) – 4:15
6. "Love Will Never Do (Without You)" (Shep's 'Work It Out' mix) – 7:38
7. "Love Will Never Do (Without You)" (U.K. Funky mix) – 6:56
8. "Love Will Never Do (Without You)" (Shep's Love mix) – 6:04
9. "Love Will Never Do (Without You)" (The 'Work It Out' dub) – 4:50
10. "Love Will Never Do (Without You)" (The Love dub) – 6:07
11. "Love Will Never Do (Without You)" (Shep's Original 7-inch) – 4:28
12. "Love Will Never Do (Without You)" (A capella) – 3:49
13. "1814 Megamix" (Full version) – 7:24
14. "You Need Me" – 4:35

== Credits and personnel ==
Credits are adapted from the Rhythm Nation 1814 album liner notes.

- Janet Jackson – lead vocals, background vocals, production
- Jimmy Jam and Terry Lewis – songwriting, production, rhythm arrangement, vocal arrangement
- Jimmy Jam – drum programing, keyboards, keyboard programming, percussion
- Terry Lewis – bass, percussion, background vocals
- Herb Alpert – trumpets
- Steve Hodge – background vocals
- René Elizondo Jr. – background vocals
- Anthony Thomas – background vocals

== Charts ==
=== Weekly charts ===
Weekly chart performance for "Love Will Never Do (Without You)"
Chart (1990–1991)	Peak position
Australia (ARIA)	14
Belgium (Ultratop 50 Flanders)	46
Canada Top Singles (RPM)	1
Canada Dance/Urban (RPM)	4
Canada Contemporary Hit Radio (The Record)	1
Europe (Eurochart Hot 100)	94
Ireland (IRMA)	22
Netherlands (Dutch Top 40)	33
Netherlands (Single Top 100)	32
New Zealand (Recorded Music NZ)	27
UK Singles (Official Charts)	34
UK Airplay (Music Week)	45
US Billboard Hot 100	1
US Adult Contemporary (Billboard)	33
US Dance Club Songs (Billboard)	4
US Dance Singles Sales (Billboard)	4
US Hot R&B/Hip-Hop Songs (Billboard)	3
US Cash Box Top 100	1
US CHR (Radio & Records)	1
US Urban Contemporary (Radio & Records)	1

=== Year-end charts ===
Year-end performance for "Love Will Never Do (Without You)"
Chart (1991)	Position
Australia (ARIA)	92
Canada Top Singles (RPM)	25
Canada Dance/Urban (RPM)	45
US Billboard Hot 100	19
US Dance Club Play (Billboard)	47
US Hot R&B Singles (Billboard)	46
US Cash Box Top 100	47
US Urban Contemporary (Radio & Records)	69

== Certifications and sales ==
Certifications and sales for "Love Will Never Do (Without You)"
Region	Certification	Certified units/sales
United States (RIAA)	Gold	500,000^{^}
^{^} Shipments figures based on certification alone.

== Release history ==
Release dates and formats for "Love Will Never Do (Without You)"
Region	Date	Format(s)	Label(s)	Ref(s).
United States	October 2, 1990	7-inch vinyl; 12-inch vinyl; cassette	A&M	
United Kingdom	October 15, 1990	7-inch vinyl; 12-inch vinyl; CD; cassette	A&M	
United Kingdom	October 29, 1990	12-inch vinyl with patch and sticker	A&M	
Australia	November 19, 1990	7-inch vinyl; 12-inch vinyl; cassette	A&M; Polydor	
Japan	December 15, 1990	Mini-CD; maxi-CD	A&M	
