= Rhythm Nation World Tour 1990 =

1990 concert tour by Janet Jackson

- Tour by Janet Jackson
- Associated album: Janet Jackson's Rhythm Nation 1814
- Start date: March 1, 1990
- End date: November 16, 1990
- Legs: 5
- No. of shows: 131
- Box office: US$28.1 million ($69.25 million in 2025 dollars)

Janet Jackson concert chronology
- Rhythm Nation World Tour 1990 (1990); Janet World Tour (1993–95)

The Rhythm Nation World Tour 1990 was the first headlining concert tour by American recording artist Janet Jackson. It was launched in support of her fourth studio album Janet Jackson's Rhythm Nation 1814 (1989), and also contained material from her third studio album Control (1986). Jackson's record label A&M announced plans for the world tour in fall 1989, following the release of Rhythm Nation 1814. Managed by Roger Davies and Rusty Hooker, the tour was developed by musical director Chuckii Booker, choreographer Anthony Thomas, stage designer Roy Bennett, stage manager Chris Tervit, production manager Benny Collins, and Jackson herself.

The nine-month trek saw concerts in the United States, Canada, Japan, the Netherlands, Germany, France, and the United Kingdom. It began in the United States in March 1990 and continued through November 1990, when it came to a close with a return trip to Japan. Songs performed during the set list of the tour were divided evenly between Jackson's third and fourth studio albums—each concert began with "Control" (1986) and ended with "Rhythm Nation" (1989). Noting performances placed greater emphasis on theatricality over vocal prowess, the tour received numerous stellar reviews based on Jackson's showmanship, choreography, and socially conscious message, drawing some comparison to her brother Michael Jackson. The tour was a commercial success, grossing over $28.1 million in North America alone.

== Background ==
Due to the fact that A&M Records had chosen not to invest in promoting a concert tour for Control (1986), the Rhythm Nation World Tour 1990 became Jackson's first in support of a studio album. A&M announced plans for her global tour in the fall of 1989. She was assisted by a team of eleven musicians, back-up singers, and six dancers. Anthony Thomas was selected as chief choreographer for the tour. Thomas stated: "Janet was looking for dancers with a hybrid of street and technical training ... I'd say the cast is half and half between those two, which is what makes it so interesting. I'm not a trained dancer—and Janet is not, either. She just looks like it because she's a natural. She picks up dance steps very quickly." According to Joel Selvin of the San Francisco Chronicle: "Thomas and Jackson also collaborated on the dance sequences for Jackson's half-hour video—a telemusical her publicists call it—that accompanied the release of her 'Rhythm Nation' album in October."

Musician and record producer Chuckii Booker was hired as Jackson's musical director; his band became the tour's opening act. Booker explained that he was approached by Jackson after a recommendation from her producers Jimmy Jam and Terry Lewis. In an interview, he stated: "I had known Janet for four to five years, but it was pretty much on a hi-and-goodbye basis until last September when she invited me to a 'Rhythm Nation' party in Los Angeles. I attended and told her I was very excited for her. She said, 'Yes, and I'd like you to be musical director.' I turned around, thinking she was talking to somebody else. I couldn't believe it. But then I found out she had talked to Jimmy and Terry and they had recommended me." Reporter Doug Adrianson wrote: "Because of the inevitable comparisons with brother Michael, 32, expectations for the Rhythm Nation Tour are higher than a moonwalk. To make sure the show is suitably spectacular, Jackson and musical director Chuckii Booker rehearsed with a sizable crew for two weeks at the Pensacola Civic Centre ... the same place Michael fine-tuned his Bad Tour." Her tour was managed by Roger Davies, stage designer Mark Fisher, and Benny Collins. Total production cost was an estimated $2 million.

== Promotion ==
On June 9, 1990, MTV aired a four-hour special entitled "Janet Jackson Saturday" featuring interviews and music videos by Jackson, as well as live coverage of her tour. The full "Rhythm Nation 1814 World Tour" concert from the second date at the Tokyo Dome in Japan was filmed and aired on Japanese television.

== Critical reception ==
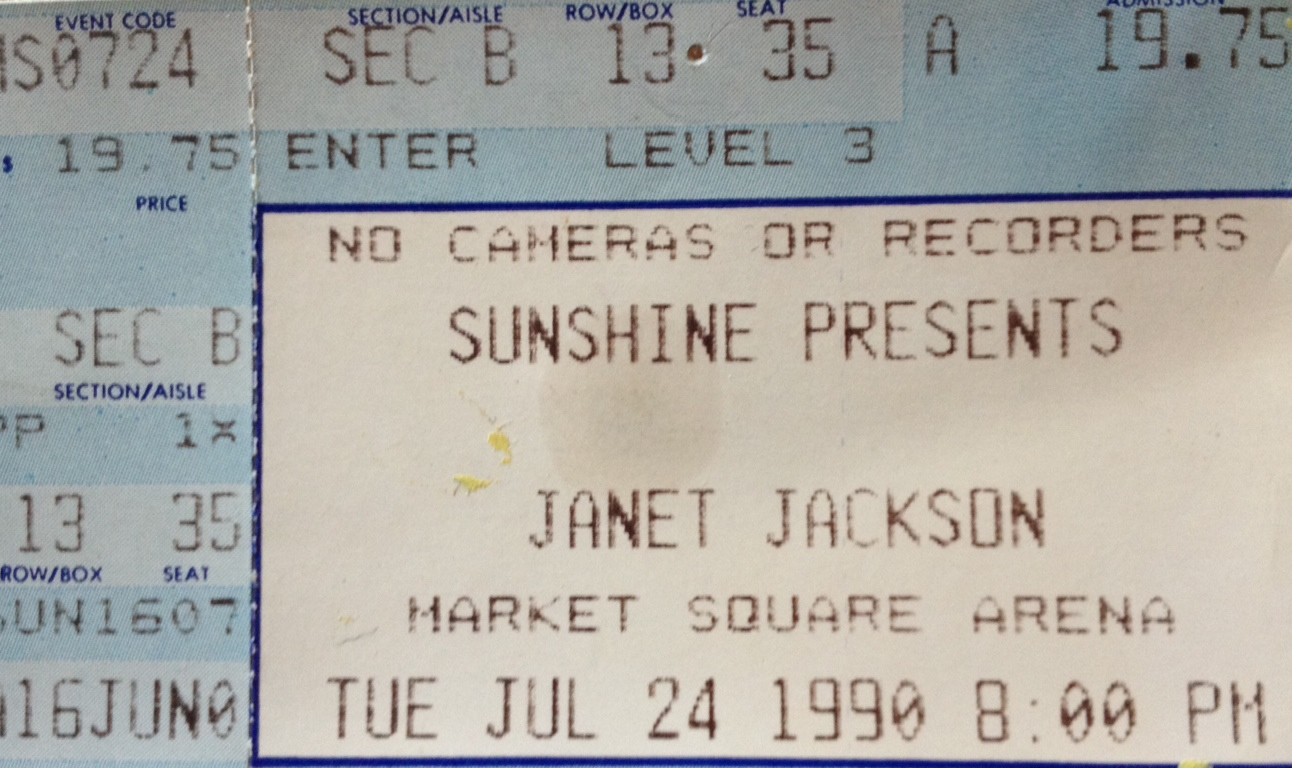
Ticket for Jackson's concert in Indianapolis, Indiana.

Music writer Troy Moon, who viewed the tour's dress rehearsal, called the show "spontaneous, very loose and limber. It came off as nightclub funk, more Prince than (Michael)." He also noted the emphasis on the show's dance routines, stating "[t]he singing almost comes as an afterthought." The debut concert in Miami, Florida on March 1, 1990 sold out prior to the performance. Music Critic Deborah Wilker remarked that "[Janet] does not present a serious threat to brother Michael, though she has proven beyond any doubt she is a formidable force in her own right." She reported the concert showcased the fact that "Jackson is an accomplished dancer whose choreography has set trends worldwide. The music, though extremely engaging, is secondary." She also reported on the media attention surrounding the opening concert, stating, "[t]he kick-off of this tour was a media event, with reporters and film crews from across the country on hand. In the audience was Janet's brother Jackie and mother Katherine, as well as singer Whitney Houston and producers Jam and Lewis."

Reviewing her concert at Madison Square Garden, Jon Pareles of The New York Times compared her showmanship to that of her brother Michael, and Prince. However, he states that she could not sing and dance simultaneously as well as either and suspected some of her performance was lip-synced. In her defense, he adds: "Yet in a video-era pop event like Miss Jackson's concert, old-fashioned musicianship matters less than the overall package—and Miss Jackson turns out to be an endearing performer despite all the calculation. Her songs are not just catchy, but full of worthwhile messages about independence and tolerance as well." Commenting on her performance at the Capital Centre in Landover, Richard Harrington of The Washington Post noted that the growing trend of video screen use in concert had both advantages and drawbacks, such as [l]iving up to the very expectations engendered by those incessantly played video images." In reference to her showmanship, he stated that "[s]he doesn't quite command the stage yet, but she has little problem commanding attention, thanks to her spectacular dancing and the wonderfully aggressive choreography that informs the 90-minute show." In his opinion, the most "engaging" aspects of the concert were Jackson's ballads such as "Let's Wait Awhile" and "Come Back to Me". He adds that "[a]lthough the focus was clearly on Jackson's dynamic dancing and her apparently boundless energy, she acquitted herself well on the vocal front. The singing seemed mostly note-perfect recaps of the records, and there is less range and dynamics here than in her dancing, but overall, it was effective enough."

Los Angeles Times critic Chris Willman, who reviewed her opening southern California concert at the Great Western Forum expressed: "If the dancing in Janet's tour is even more enthralling than that of brother Michael (who can still best her in pure technical proficiency), it's because she spends so much of her stage time working with six other dancers as part of a hip-hop chorus line. It represents the pinnacle of what can be done in the popping 'n' locking style-a rapid-fire mixture of rigidly jerky and gracefully fluid movements." He complimented her endurance for her 80-minute-plus show and downplayed criticism of lip-syncing by saying "[e]ven a classically trained vocalist would be hard-pressed to maintain any sort of level of volume—or, more appropriately, 'Control'—while bounding up and down stairs and whipping limbs in unnatural directions at impeccable, breakneck speed." The first international concert took place in Tokyo, Japan at the Tokyo Dome on May 17, 1990. Los Angeles Times reported that "Japan became a 'Rhythm Nation' as Janet Jackson opened her tour at the Tokyo Dome, cascading thunderous waves of funk and choreography over 50,000 people ... The choreography, a cross between break-dancing and military maneuvers, sent some spectators dancing into the aisles." Jackson also performed in Osaka and Yokohama before returning to the North America and then traveled to Europe for the final leg of her tour.

Helen Metella of the Edmonton Journal praised Jackson's elaborate stage show, calling her socially conscious message of unity a "noble quest." In reference of the comparisons between her and brother Michael, Metella comments that "the 23-year-old Jackson throws herself into an orgy of non-stop dancing and extravagant theatrics that clearly express her talent and her personal philosophies. She may not have surpassed Michael yet, but she's closing in on him fast—using many of his own tricks, yet." In reviewing her performance at Northlands Coliseum in Edmonton, Canada, Metella reports that the use of lighting and sound effects made for an excellent routine in addition to the well received vocalization of songs like "Control", "Nasty", and "What Have You Done for Me Lately", "[b]ut it was the dancing that was most electrifying ...witnessing the astonishing pace and physical commitment of Jackson during the dance numbers could and did galvanize us into action of our own, which is exactly what the show was about."

== Commercial reception ==
The majority of all of the tour's concert dates became instant sell-outs. The tour's dress rehearsal at the Pensacola Civic Center issued 7,600 tickets to the public as a benefit to local charity, which sold-out in less than an hour. The first international concert, which took place in Tokyo, Japan sold out the Tokyo Dome within seven minutes—a record for the fastest sellout in the history of the Dome. Lori Buttars of The Salt Lake Tribune reported: "In May, Janet Jackson's Rhythm Nation Tour became the fastest sell-out in Salt Palace history. Tickets for the June 18 concert were gone in a record 1 hour and 20 minutes after the box office opened." In June, 1990, the South Florida Sun-Sentinel reported that Jackson's tour had become one of the most commercially successful box office attractions for a recording artist. In addition, "of those women soloists who regularly reach the top of the record charts, only Madonna is doing similar arena business." Grossing $28.1 million in the United States alone, the tour ranked number five among the best-selling of 1990 within the US, making Jackson the only female artist to place within the top ten. The Rhythm Nation World Tour, with an attendance of over two million patrons, is the most successful debut tour by any recording artist in history, a record that still stands in 2026.

== Opening acts ==
- Chuckii Booker (select venues)
- Johnny Gill (select venues)

== Set list ==
1. "Control"
2. "Nasty"
3. "What Have You Done for Me Lately"
4. "Let's Wait Awhile"
5. "When I Think of You"
6. "The Pleasure Principle"
7. "T.V." (interlude)
8. "State of the World"
9. "Race" (interlude)
10. "The Knowledge"
11. "Funny How Time Flies (When You're Having Fun)" (instrumental interlude)
12. "Black Cat"
13. "Come Back to Me"
14. "Alright"
15. "Escapade"
16. "Miss You Much"
17. "Pledge" (interlude)
18. "Rhythm Nation"

== Shows ==
List of concerts, showing date, city, country, venue, tickets sold, number of available tickets and amount of gross revenue
Date (1990)	City	Country	Venue	Attendance	Revenue
North America
March 1	Miami	United States	Miami Arena	15,082 / 15,082	$297,870
March 3	Chapel Hill	United States	Dean Smith Center	17,095 / 17,095	$321,653
March 4	Charlotte	United States	Charlotte Coliseum	20,834 / 20,834	$398,892
March 6	Columbia	United States	Carolina Coliseum	—N/a	—N/a
March 7	Knoxville	United States	Thompson–Boling Arena	15,449 / 15,449	$285,554
March 9	Louisville	United States	Freedom Hall	17,639 / 17,639	$332,787
March 10	Cincinnati	United States	Riverfront Coliseum	15,312 / 15,312	$283,272
March 12	Richfield	United States	Richfield Coliseum	16,990 / 16,990	$314,315
March 13	Pittsburgh	United States	Civic Arena	15,825 / 15,825	$287,906
March 15	New York City	United States	Madison Square Garden	35,741 / 35,741	$1,053,548
March 16	New York City	United States	Madison Square Garden	35,741 / 35,741	$1,053,548
March 19	Montreal	Canada	Montreal Forum	13,000 / 13,000	$281,888
March 20	Toronto	Canada	SkyDome	22,625 / 22,625	$476,627
March 22	Landover	United States	Capital Centre	34,581 / 34,581	$765,112
March 23	Hartford	United States	Hartford Civic Center	—N/a	—N/a
March 26	Worcester	United States	Worcester Centrum	27,600 / 27,600	$600,458
March 27	Worcester	United States	Worcester Centrum	27,600 / 27,600	$600,458
March 29	Landover	United States	Capital Centre		(Note: The score data is representative of the two shows at the Capital Centre on March 22 and March 29.)
March 31	Hampton	United States	Hampton Coliseum	—N/a	—N/a
April 2	Detroit	United States	Joe Louis Arena	35,645 / 35,645	$702,460
April 3	Detroit	United States	Joe Louis Arena	35,645 / 35,645	$702,460
April 5	Bloomington	United States	Met Center	—N/a	—N/a
April 6	Bloomington	United States	Met Center	—N/a	—N/a
April 8	Rosemont	United States	Rosemont Horizon	—N/a	—N/a
April 9	Rosemont	United States	Rosemont Horizon	15,703 / 15,703	$347,063
April 11	Kansas City	United States	Kemper Arena	14,516 / 14,516	$283,062
April 13	Fort Worth	United States	Tarrant County Convention Center	13,233 / 13,233	$258,043
April 15	Houston	United States	The Summit	27,082 / 30,000	$506,903
April 16	Houston	United States	The Summit	27,082 / 30,000	$506,903
April 18	Tempe	United States	ASU Activity Center	—N/a	—N/a
April 20	Inglewood	United States	Great Western Forum	57,600 / 57,600	$1,196,448
April 21	Inglewood	United States	Great Western Forum	57,600 / 57,600	$1,196,448
April 23	San Diego	United States	San Diego Sports Arena	13,283 / 13,283	$264,233
April 25	Inglewood	United States	Great Western Forum	(Note: The score data is representative of the four shows at the Great Western Forum on April 20 and April 21, April 25 and April 26 respectively.)	
April 26	Inglewood	United States	Great Western Forum	(Note: The score data is representative of the four shows at the Great Western Forum on April 20 and April 21, April 25 and April 26 respectively.)	
April 28	Oakland	United States	Oakland–Alameda County Coliseum Arena	58,002 / 58,002	$1,363,047
April 29	Oakland	United States	Oakland–Alameda County Coliseum Arena	58,002 / 58,002	$1,363,047
May 1	Oakland	United States	Oakland–Alameda County Coliseum Arena	58,002 / 58,002	$1,363,047
May 2	Oakland	United States	Oakland–Alameda County Coliseum Arena	58,002 / 58,002	$1,363,047
May 4	Sacramento	United States	ARCO Arena	29,942 / 29,942	$703,637
May 5	Sacramento	United States	ARCO Arena	29,942 / 29,942	$703,637
Asia
May 17	Tokyo	Japan	Tokyo Dome	—N/a	—N/a
May 18	Tokyo	Japan	Tokyo Dome	—N/a	—N/a
May 20	Osaka	Japan	Osaka-jō Hall	—N/a	—N/a
May 21	Osaka	Japan	Osaka-jō Hall	—N/a	—N/a
May 23	Yokohama	Japan	Yokohama Arena	—N/a	—N/a
North America
June 6	Tacoma	United States	Tacoma Dome	39,287 / 47,370	$893,779
June 7	Tacoma	United States	Tacoma Dome	39,287 / 47,370	$893,779
June 9	Vancouver	Canada	BC Place	—N/a	—N/a
June 11	Edmonton	Canada	Northlands Coliseum	—N/a	—N/a
June 12	Calgary	Canada	Olympic Saddledome	14,531 / 16,507	$317,334
June 15	Denver	United States	McNichols Sports Arena	—N/a	—N/a
June 16	Denver	United States	McNichols Sports Arena	—N/a	—N/a
June 18	Salt Lake City	United States	Salt Palace	—N/a	—N/a
June 20	Mountain View	United States	Shoreline Amphitheatre	34,698 / 40,000	$730,905
June 21	Mountain View	United States	Shoreline Amphitheatre	34,698 / 40,000	$730,905
June 23	Costa Mesa	United States	Pacific Amphitheatre	—N/a	—N/a
June 24	Costa Mesa	United States	Pacific Amphitheatre	—N/a	—N/a
June 26	Inglewood	United States	Great Western Forum	42,848 / 42,848	$892,188
June 27	Inglewood	United States	Great Western Forum	42,848 / 42,848	$892,188
June 29	Inglewood	United States	Great Western Forum	42,848 / 42,848	$892,188
July 2	Dallas	United States	Reunion Arena	—N/a	—N/a
July 3	Oklahoma City	United States	Myriad Convention Center Arena	—N/a	—N/a
July 5	Austin	United States	Frank Erwin Center	24,974 / 26,508	$484,477
July 6	Austin	United States	Frank Erwin Center	24,974 / 26,508	$484,477
July 8	New Orleans	United States	Louisiana Superdome	—N/a	—N/a
July 10	Memphis	United States	Mid-South Coliseum	10,488 / 10,488	$235,980
July 12	Miami	United States	Miami Arena	10,031 / 11,500	$225,698
July 13	Orlando	United States	Orlando Arena	12,842 / 12,842	$288,945
July 14	St. Petersburg	United States	Florida Suncoast Dome	18,833 / 18,833	$419,647
July 16	Atlanta	United States	Omni Coliseum	51,712 / 51,712	$1,034,240
July 17	Atlanta	United States	Omni Coliseum	51,712 / 51,712	$1,034,240
July 19	Atlanta	United States	Omni Coliseum	51,712 / 51,712	$1,034,240
July 20	Atlanta	United States	Omni Coliseum	51,712 / 51,712	$1,034,240
July 22	Birmingham	United States	BJCC Coliseum	13,354 / 13,354	$287,111
July 24	Indianapolis	United States	Market Square Arena	12,962 / 12,962	$256,000
July 25	Cincinnati	United States	Riverbend Music Center	—N/a	—N/a
July 27	Milwaukee	United States	Bradley Center	15,491 / 15,884	$298,860
July 29	Tinley Park	United States	World Music Theatre	—N/a	—N/a
July 30	Tinley Park	United States	World Music Theatre	—N/a	—N/a
August 1	Tinley Park	United States	World Music Theatre	—N/a	—N/a
August 5 (Note: Partially performed, passed out backstage during show.)	St. Louis	United States	St. Louis Arena		
August 10	Landover	United States	Capital Centre	44,812 / 44,812	$1,019,473
August 11	Landover	United States	Capital Centre	44,812 / 44,812	$1,019,473
August 13	Landover	United States	Capital Centre	44,812 / 44,812	$1,019,473
August 14	Greensboro	United States	Greensboro Coliseum	—N/a	—N/a
August 16	Philadelphia	United States	The Spectrum	—N/a	—N/a
August 17	Philadelphia	United States	The Spectrum	—N/a	—N/a
August 19	Philadelphia	United States	The Spectrum	—N/a	—N/a
August 21	Ottawa	Canada	Lansdowne Park	8,013 / 12,000	$188,044
August 22	Auburn Hills	United States	The Palace of Auburn Hills	32,832 / 32,832	$746,928
August 23	Auburn Hills	United States	The Palace of Auburn Hills	32,832 / 32,832	$746,928
August 25	Albany	United States	Knickerbocker Arena	13,200 / 13,200	$254,623
August 27	Providence	United States	Providence Civic Center	10,709 / 11,805	$243,630
August 28	Uniondale	United States	Nassau Veterans Memorial Coliseum	12,827 / 15,029	$291,814
August 30	East Rutherford	United States	Brendan Byrne Arena	15,686 / 15,686	$317,168
Europe
October 4	Rotterdam	Netherlands	Ahoy Sportpaleis	37,602 / 37,602	$806,458
October 5	Rotterdam	Netherlands	Ahoy Sportpaleis	37,602 / 37,602	$806,458
October 6	Rotterdam	Netherlands	Ahoy Sportpaleis	37,602 / 37,602	$806,458
October 8	Berlin	Germany	Werner-Seelenbinder-Halle	8,965 / 8,965	$132,079
October 9	Hamburg	Germany	Alsterdorfer Sporthalle	—N/a	—N/a
October 12	Stockholm	Sweden	Stockholm Globe Arena	—N/a	—N/a
October 14	Paris	France	Palais Omnisports de Paris-Bercy	16,782 / 16,782	$217,093
October 15	Zürich	Switzerland	Hallenstadion	—N/a	—N/a
October 16	Munich	Germany	Olympiahalle	—N/a	—N/a
October 18	Frankfurt	Germany	Festhalle Frankfurt	—N/a	—N/a
October 21	London	England	Wembley Arena	—N/a	—N/a
October 22	London	England	Wembley Arena	—N/a	—N/a
October 24	Brussels	Belgium	Forest National	—N/a	—N/a
October 26	Birmingham	England	NEC Arena	—N/a	—N/a
October 27	Birmingham	England	NEC Arena	—N/a	—N/a
October 28	London	England	Wembley Arena	—N/a	—N/a
October 29	London	England	Wembley Arena	—N/a	—N/a
Asia
November 3	Osaka	Japan	Osaka-jō Hall	—N/a	—N/a
November 4	Osaka	Japan	Osaka-jō Hall	—N/a	—N/a
November 6	Tokyo	Japan	Tokyo Dome	—N/a	—N/a
November 7	Tokyo	Japan	Tokyo Dome	—N/a	—N/a
November 9	Hong Kong		Hong Kong Coliseum	—N/a	—N/a
November 10	Hong Kong		Hong Kong Coliseum	—N/a	—N/a
November 11	Hong Kong		Hong Kong Coliseum	—N/a	—N/a
November 14	Nagoya	Japan	Nagoya Rainbow Hall	—N/a	—N/a
November 15	Nagoya	Japan	Nagoya Rainbow Hall	—N/a	—N/a
November 16	Yokohama	Japan	Yokohama Arena	—N/a	—N/a
Total				1,044,858 / 1,044,858	$21,800,000 USD

== Cancelled shows ==
List of cancelled concerts, showing date, city, country and venue
Date	City	Country	Venue
August 2, 1990	Lexington	United States	Rupp Arena
August 5, 1990 (Note: Cancelled because of August 4 St. Louis concert being moved up a day.)	Ames	United States	Hilton Coliseum
September 2, 1990	Toronto	Canada	CNE Grandstand
September 3, 1990	Burgettstown	United States	Coca-Cola Star Lake Amphitheater
September 4, 1990	Richfield	United States	Richfield Coliseum
October 11, 1990	Copenhagen	Denmark	Valby-Hallen

== Credits ==
=== Tour ===
- Management – Roger Davies Management, Inc.
- Tour Manager – Rusty Hooker
- Assistant Tour Manager – Nelson Hayes
- Production Manager – Benny Collins
- Assistant Production Manager – Lisa Hoth
- Stage Manager – Chris Tervit
- FOH Sound Engineer - Chris Taylor
- Monitor Engineer - Randy Weitzel
- Musical Director – Chuckii Booker
- Lighting/Design – Roy Bennett
- Lighting Director - John Featherstone
- Automated Lighting- Gary Westcott
- Drum Technician - Tom Wilson
- Tour Photography – Eddie Wolfl

=== The band ===
- Musical Director/Keyboards/Vocals: Chuckii Booker
- Drums: Derek Organ
- Keyboards: Tom Organ, Rex Salas
- Percussion: Tim "Timbali" Cornwell
- Guitar: David Barry
- Bass/Keyboards: Derek Allen
- Background vocals: Vanessa Townsell, Pamela Quinlan, Nadirah Ali

=== Dancers – "The Nation" ===
- Choreography

Janet Jackson, Anthony Thomas, Terry Bixler, LaVelle Smith

- Staging

Janet Jackson, Tina Landon, LaVelle Smith, Terry Bixler, Anthony Thomas, Art Palmer, Karen Owens, Travis Payne

== Miscellaneous ==
- The tour grossed over $28 million in the US only from dates reported.
- Estimated worldwide attendance at 2 million, with more than 1.85 million in North America alone coming from 91 shows.
- The May 18 show in Tokyo, Japan was aired on Japanese television in full, spliced with commercials Janet had filmed for JAL Airlines.
- The first international concert, which took place in Tokyo, Japan sold out the Tokyo Dome within seven minutes and set a record for the fastest sellout in the history of the Dome.
- The Rhythm Nation Tour became the fastest sell-out in Salt Palace history in Salt Lake City. Tickets for the June 18 concert were sold out in a record 1 hour and 20 minutes after the box office opened.
- Rehearsals for the Rhythm Nation Tour were held in Los Angeles. Jackson then rehearsed in Pensacola, Florida for two weeks before the tour kickoff. Jackson surprised the people of Pensacola with a concert that was announced only one day ahead of time. The $10 tickets, limited to a four per person, didn't go on sale until the morning of the concert. All 7,600 tickets were sold within three hours. Another 1,000 tickets were given to local charities.
- Jackson donated over $1/2 million to fund education projects from concert proceeds and also donated 25 cents from each ticket sold to the Cities in Schools program, which works to prevent kids from dropping out of school. After the tour ended, she gave $500,000 to the United Negro College Fund in the form of a "Rhythm Nation Scholarship".
- Jackson's first show for the summer tour, Saturday June, 7 at the Tacoma Dome in Tacoma WA, sold out so fast that she quickly added a second show – to be performed the day before, on Friday June 6. At the Saturday show, she had the world premiere of the video for "Black Cat" that had been filmed the night before.
- Jackson was scheduled to play Philadelphia in March but somehow the people who manage the Spectrum arena doubled-booked Jackson's show and a WWF match on the same night. The sold-out show was rescheduled in August.
- Jackson's four Los Angeles shows sold out in 48 minutes.
- Jackson had to reschedule her appearance at Byrne Arena in East Rutherford, New Jersey from September 8 to August 30 because of her performance at the 1990 MTV Video Music Awards.
- The opening act throughout all dates of the tour was the tour's musical director, Chuckii Booker. On the Show in Munich, Germany it was Johnny Gill.
- Jackson had to reverse the decision to use a live panther on the show after several incidents, including the panther urinating on stage. Citing concerns from fans, and her own love of animals, Jackson eventually did not use the cat in the summer leg of the tour.
- Jackson spent her 24th birthday at Tokyo Disneyland.
- Janet plans to release the "Rhythm Nation 1814 World Tour" on DVD or package it with an upcoming studio album in the near future. Bootleg versions are widely available.
- Pioneer signed an exclusive deal to release the concert on laser disc only and thus no video or DVD has yet been released. However, no laser disc has been released either.

== See also ==
- List of highest-grossing concert tours by women
