= Come Back to Me (Janet Jackson song) =

1990 single by Janet Jackson

Single by Janet Jackson

from the album Janet Jackson's Rhythm Nation 1814
- B-side: "Alright"; "Skin Game" (Parts I and II); "Vuelve a mí"
- Released: January 15, 1990
- Studio: Flyte Tyme (Minneapolis, Minnesota)
- Genre: Quiet storm; pop
- Length: 5:32
- Label: A&M
- Songwriters: Janet Jackson; James Harris III; Terry Lewis
- Producers: Jimmy Jam and Terry Lewis; Janet Jackson

Janet Jackson singles chronology
"Alright" (1990)	"Come Back to Me" (1990)	"Black Cat" (1990)

Music video
- "Come Back to Me" on YouTube

"Come Back to Me" is a song by the American singer Janet Jackson from her fourth album, Janet Jackson's Rhythm Nation 1814 (1989). It was written and produced by Jackson in collaboration with Jimmy Jam and Terry Lewis. The quiet storm ballad talks about a lover trying to rekindle a romance that faded away a long time ago. It was released as the fifth single from the album in the United States on June 18, 1990, by A&M Records, while in the United Kingdom, it was issued as the album's third single on January 15, 1990. Jackson also recorded a Spanish version of the song titled "Vuelve a mí".

The song received positive reviews from most music critics, who praised Jackson's sweet delivery and the song's instrumentation; it was also called a sexy and silky ballad. It became a commercial success on the charts, reaching the top three in Canada and the United States while also reaching the top twenty in the United Kingdom. The music video for the song was directed by Dominic Sena and it was set in Paris. The romantic video features Jackson's former husband René Elizondo Jr. Jackson has performed the track in all of her tours, with the exception of The Velvet Rope Tour (1998).

== Background and release ==
While writing for her fourth studio album, Rhythm Nation 1814, Jackson felt a lot of pressure to follow up the success of previous album, Control (1986). Jackson enlisted previous collaborators and record producers Jimmy Jam & Terry Lewis to work with her on the album, and according to the duo, she was excited, and creative juices were flowing." Jam claimed, "It was me, Janet, Terry and [executive producer] John McClain – and Rene Elizondo also. Let me include him on the creative mix. If the ideas weren't flowing from that group of people, they weren't really being listened to." The album's concept was developed after Jackson, Jam and Lewis watched television shows talk about the many social problems that were going on in the world, such as racism, homelessness, drugs and illiteracy. However, the second half of the record is filled with love songs, including "Come Back to Me".

Following "Alright", "Come Back to Me" was announced to be the fifth single from Rhythm Nation 1814 and it was released on June 18, 1990. Its CD single contains the B-side "The Skin Game Pt. 1", while "The Skin Game Pt. 2" is an instrumental which appears exclusively on select releases. Jackson also recorded the song in Spanish, titled "Vuelve a mí" which also appears on select releases. In the UK, the song was released as the third single from the album, in January 1990.

== Composition ==
"Come Back to Me" was written by Janet Jackson with Jimmy Jam and Terry Lewis; the latter two also serving as the song's producers. According to the sheet music published at Musicnotes.com by EMI Music Publishing, "Come Back to Me" is in common time with an "easy ballad" tempo of 78 beats per minute, and set in the key of A♭ major, following a basic chord progression from D♭-E♭-F-G. The vocals span from the low of E♭3 to the high of B♭5. Lyrically, "Come Back to Me" talks about a lover trying to recapture the rapture of a romance that blossomed and faded away a long time ago. The song is a quiet storm ballad, featuring chord changes and a bridge with a soaring, cinematic outro.

=== Recording ===
While commenting over the song to Billboard's Kenneth Partridge, producer Jimmy Jam claimed that, "At the time we did it, it was one of my favorite songs. I loved the lyrics and the vocal on it." However, for him, "the interesting thing [...] was the live strings." He further commented:

I never heard the strings when we were doing it. We'd kept it simple, and Janet said, "It'd be great to get some strings on this." There was a guy in Minneapolis [arranger Lee Blaske] who was an incredible string guy. He arranged a lot of our string stuff. I said, "Hey, Lee, come up with a string thing for this," and he did. We loved it so much that the end of the song, it basically fades out with just the strings as the last thing you hear.

== Critical reception ==
The song received positive reviews from most music critics, who went on to praise Jackson's delivery and the strings used on the song. Alex Henderson of AllMusic praised the song, calling it a "caressing, silky ballad," while Jon Pareles of The New York Times labeled it a "glistening ballad for adult contemporary outlets. Pareles also noted that it "recalls the production by Mr. Harris and Mr. Lewis for the Human League's "Only Human", and "caresses the ear with overdubbed voices." Wendy Robinson wrote for PopMatters that the song shows "a more reflective, dramatic side of Janet Jackson." Chris Gerard of Metro Weekly went on to call it a "sexy ballad," featuring "a beautifully layered vocal by Jackson and some lovely instrumentation by Jam and Lewis." Stephen McMillian of Soul Train named it a "romantic ballad" and "one of the more memorable songs during the summer of 1990." Eric Henderson of Slant Magazine praised the track, writing:

"'Come Back to Me' smartly obscures Janet's nondescript pillow-talk delivery within luscious folds upon folds of gut-wrenching chord changes, topping the tragic, plunging bridge with a soaring, cinematic outro that leaves Janet speechless, admitting, 'I don't know what else to say.' It's the quintessential song in the key of heartbreak, but its despair leaves listeners properly stripped and ready to receive the pornography of 'Someday Is Tonight,' which I'm still not sure I'm old enough to listen to."

== Chart performance ==
The song reached number two on the US Billboard Hot 100 and number one on the US Cash Box Top 100. It also became Jackson's only number-one hit on the Billboard Adult Contemporary chart. Internationally, the song became a success, reaching number three in Canada and number 20 on the UK Singles Chart and number 21 in Ireland.

== Music video ==
Directed by American director Dominic Sena in November 1989, the video is set in Paris, France, where Jackson deals with a former lover leaving her, reminiscing about the good moments spent together. The male lead in the video was René Elizondo Jr., whom she would marry a year later. The video shows the Pont de Bir-Hakeim, the Eiffel Tower, the Grand Palais, the Gare d'Austerlitz, the Champs de Mars area, and the view from Montmartre, among others. It appears on the video compilation Design of a Decade: 1986–1996 and was released on iTunes on May 4, 2007.

== Live performances and covers ==
Jackson has performed the song on most of her tours, including the Rhythm Nation 1814 Tour, janet. Tour, All for You Tour, Rock Witchu Tour, Number Ones: Up Close and Personal tour, Unbreakable World Tour, State of the World Tour and her 2019 Las Vegas residency Janet Jackson: Metamorphosis. On the janet. Tour, it was cut from the set list after the first leg. During the All for You Tour (2001-2002), Jackson performed a mellow medley of "Come Back to Me", "Let's Wait Awhile" and "Again". Denise Sheppard of Rolling Stone commented that, "Without question, [it was] one of the night's most beautiful and verklempt moments arrived out of nowhere forty-five minutes into the set. It was the first time that a break in the action occurred - no dancers, no music – and as a close-up captured Jackson looking genuinely happy, the audience spontaneously burst into what became a five-minute standing ovation. Looking on, shocked by the sincerity of the moment, she shed sincere tears, simultaneously overwhelmed and overjoyed. 'I love you so much, Vancouver. Thank you'." The February 16, 2002, final date of the tour at the Aloha Stadium in Hawaii, was broadcast by HBO, and included a performance of it. The medley was also added to the setlist at its DVD release, Janet: Live in Hawaii, in 2002. On the Number Ones: Up Close and Personal tour, Jackson used a diamond-encrusted lavender gown to perform a ballad medley of "Nothing", "Come Back to Me" and "Let's Wait Awhile". Annabel Ross of Sydney's Everguide praised Jackson for "hitting some impressive high notes herself".

In 1992, saxophonist Marion Meadows covered the song from his album Keep It Right There with additional vocals by Will Downing. In 2008, American rapper Plies sampled the song for his single "Bust It Baby (Part 2)", which featured Ne-Yo, while Jackson appears on the official remix of the song.

== Track listings and formats ==
UK 12-inch single (USAF681)

1. "Come Back to Me" (The Abandoned Heart mix) – 5:19
2. "Alright" (12-inch R&B mix) – 7:17
3. "Alright" (house dub) – 5:58

UK CD single (USACD681)

1. "Come Back to Me" (7-inch I'm Beggin' You mix) – 4:46
2. "Alright" (7-inch R&B mix) – 4:34
3. "Alright" (7-inch house mix with rap) – 5:35

US 12-inch single (SP-12345)

1. "Come Back to Me" (7-inch I'm Beggin' You mix) – 4:46
2. "Come Back to Me" (I'm Beggin' You mix) – 5:33
3. "Come Back to Me" (LP instrumental) – 5:15
4. "The Skin Game, Part I" – 6:43
5. "The Skin Game, Part II" – 6:37

Japanese 3-inch CD single (PCDY-10015)

1. "Come Back to Me" (7-inch I'm Beggin' You mix) – 4:46
2. "Vuelve a mi" – 5:15

Japanese CD maxi single (PCCY-10131)

1. "Come Back to Me" (7-inch I'm Beggin' You mix) – 4:46
2. "Come Back to Me" (I'm Beggin' You mix) – 5:33
3. "Vuelve a mi" – 5:15
4. "Come Back to Me" (The Abandoned Heart mix) – 5:19
5. "Come Back to Me" (LP version) – 5:35
6. "Come Back to Me" (LP instrumental) – 5:15
7. "Vuelve a mi" (Spanish) – 5:21
8. "The Skin Game, Part I" – 6:43
9. "The Skin Game, Part II" – 6:37

== Charts ==
=== Weekly charts ===
Chart (1990–1991)	Peak position
Australia (ARIA)	79
Canada Retail Singles (The Record)	27
Canada Contemporary Hit Radio (The Record)	4
Canada Top Singles (RPM)	3
Canada Adult Contemporary (RPM)	1
Europe (European Hot 100 Singles)	52
Ireland (IRMA)	21
Luxembourg (Radio Luxembourg)	16
UK Singles (Official Charts)	20
US Billboard Hot 100	2
US Adult Contemporary (Billboard)	1
US Dance Singles Sales (Billboard)	17
US Hot R&B/Hip-Hop Songs (Billboard)	2
US Cash Box Top 100	1
US Adult Contemporary (Radio & Records)	1
US Contemporary Hit Radio (Radio & Records)	1
US Urban (Radio & Records)	1

=== Year-end charts ===
Chart (1990)	Position
Canada Top Singles (RPM)	34
Canada Adult Contemporary (RPM)	46
US Billboard Hot 100	49
US Adult Contemporary (Billboard)	20
US Hot R&B Singles (Billboard)	47
US Cash Box Top 100	26
US Adult Contemporary (Radio & Records)	19
US Contemporary Hit Radio (Radio & Records)	25
US Urban (Radio & Records)	39

== Release history ==
Region	Date	Format(s)	Label(s)	Ref(s).
United Kingdom	January 15, 1990	7-inch vinyl; 12-inch vinyl; CD; cassette	A&M	
United Kingdom	January 22, 1990	12-inch vinyl with poster	A&M	
United Kingdom	January 29, 1990	7-inch vinyl box set	A&M	
United Kingdom	February 5, 1990	12-inch vinyl (The Remixes)	A&M	
United States	June 18, 1990	7-inch vinyl; 12-inch vinyl; cassette	A&M	
Japan	July 21, 1990	Mini-CD; mini-album	A&M	
Australia	March 18, 1991	7-inch vinyl; 12-inch vinyl; CD; cassette	A&M; Polydor	
