= Alright (Janet Jackson song) =

1990 single by Janet Jackson

- North American and Japanese cover

Single by Janet Jackson

from the album Janet Jackson's Rhythm Nation 1814
- B-side: "Vuelve a Mí"
- Released: March 4, 1990
- Studio: Flyte Tyme (Edina, Minnesota)
- Genre: R&B; new jack swing; funk
- Length: 6:26 (album version); 5:01 (7-inch house mix); 4:39 (Goh Hotoda mix/1995 short mix)
- Label: A&M
- Songwriters: Janet Jackson; James Harris III; Terry Lewis; James Brown; Carlos Ward
- Producers: Jimmy Jam and Terry Lewis; Janet Jackson

Janet Jackson singles chronology
"Escapade" (1990)	"Alright" (1990)	"Come Back to Me" (1990)

Music video
- "Alright" on YouTube

"Alright" is a song by American singer-songwriter Janet Jackson from her fourth studio album, Janet Jackson's Rhythm Nation 1814 (1989). Written by Jackson and Jimmy Jam & Terry Lewis, the song was released on March 4, 1990, by A&M Records as the fourth single from Janet Jackson's Rhythm Nation 1814. In the United Kingdom, it was issued as the album's fifth single in June 1990.

While it was to become the only single of the seven released off the Rhythm Nation 1814 album to not hit the top-two on the US Billboard Hot 100, reaching number four, it became the fourth consecutive single from the album to reach number one on the Dance Club Songs, helping Jackson break a record set by Madonna. "Alright" earned Jackson two 1991 Grammy Award nominations for Best Female R&B Vocal Performance and Best R&B Song. Its accompanying music video was directed by Julien Temple.

== Composition ==
"Alright" samples Lyn Collins' 1972 song "Think (About It)" and the song's final hook samples B.T. Express' 1974 song "Do You Like It". The song was recorded again in January 1990 with Heavy D for the music video.

== Chart performance ==
"Alright" peaked at number four on the US Billboard Hot 100, number two on the Hot R&B/Hip-Hop Songs and number one on the Dance Club Songs. It is the only single from the album that did not reach the top two on the Billboard Hot 100.

== Music video ==
The music video to the song was directed by British director Julien Temple and filmed on the New York Street backlot of Universal Studios Hollywood in February 1990. It was styled to resemble a 1930s and 1950s musical, and featured Cyd Charisse, the Nicholas Brothers, and Cab Calloway in one of his last on-screen appearances. Anthony Thomas choreographed the video, with some scenes staged by veteran Hollywood choreographer Michael Kidd. The video begins with Jackson and two male dancers, including Richard Gaines, all wearing flashy zoot suits sitting on a bench. A paperboy throws newspapers on them. They wake up and read the front page, from which they learn Calloway is in town for the premiere of his Alright film. Jackson and her dancers take a crosstown journey to the premiere. Along the way, Jackson meets Cyd Charisse coming out of a store. They share a few steps, and the scene moves on. There, Jackson, her dancers and Calloway fans wait for Calloway to make his grand entrance. Jackson seemingly envisions herself as Calloway's glamorized female guest, getting pushed to the red carpet. Calloway takes her hand and helps her up. Jackson and her dancers get in Calloway's limo. They arrive at large dance out in the middle of a street. Jackson and her dancers climb on the back of a car and Jackson notices her watch is missing. They get off the car and are sprayed by a street cleaning truck. They sit on the bench. Later that night, Jackson and her dancers are homeless people asleep on the bench—revealing the video to have been a dream. Cab Calloway, in the meantime, walks to the bench and places Jackson's watch in her hand. He sneaks away saying, "Alright". There is also an extended version that features rapper Heavy D. Jackson won Best R&B/Soul or Rap Music Video at the 1991 Soul Train Music Awards.

During MTV's first-ever MTV Icon in 2001, American singer Usher paid tribute to Jackson by re-enacting the sidewalk bench routine with the two male dancers from the "Alright" music video. His "U Don't Have to Call" video also uses roller shoes as a gimmick. In 2011, Chris Brown's video "Yeah 3x" was compared to the video. In 2024, singer-songwriter Victoria Monét released a video for her song, also titled "Alright", featuring choreography and a black and white pinstripe outfit and hat, which pays homage to Jackson's "Alright" video.

== Live performances ==
Jackson has performed the song on all of her tours. In the Rhythm Nation 1814 Tour, janet. Tour, The Velvet Rope Tour and All for You Tour, Jackson performs the song wearing a Zoot suit. On the Rock Witchu Tour, she wears a sailor suit. On the Number Ones: Up Close and Personal tour, she wears a black catsuit. Jackson also included the song on her 2015–2016 Unbreakable World Tour and the 2017–2019 State of the World Tour in a medley with "Miss You Much" and "You Want This". She also included the song on her 2019 Las Vegas residency Janet Jackson: Metamorphosis. It was also included on her special concert series Janet Jackson: A Special 30th Anniversary Celebration of Rhythm Nation in 2019. Jackson performed the song in 2023 on her Janet Jackson: Together Again tour.

== Track listings and formats ==
- US 12-inch single
1. "Alright" (12-inch R&B mix)§ – 7:17
2. "Alright" (7-inch R&B mix) – 4:34
3. "Alright" (a cappella) – 3:26
4. "Alright" (12-inch house mix)§ – 8:30
5. "Alright" (hip house dub)§ – 6:40
6. "Alright" (house dub) – 5:58
- UK 12-inch single
1. "Alright" (CJ Mackintosh hip hop mix)§ – 7:24
2. "Alright" (CJ Mackintosh house mix) – 9:10

Other notable mixes

- "Alright" (CD album version) – 6:28
- "Alright" (vinyl album version) – 5:27
- "Alright" (7-inch remix) – 4:11
- "Alright" (7-inch remix with rap)§ – 4:34
- "Alright" (7-inch R&B mix with rap)§ – 4:51
- "Alright" (7-inch house mix with rap)§ – 4:56

Mixes with symbol (§) include rap by Heavy D.

== Charts ==
=== Weekly charts ===
Chart (1990)	Peak position
Belgium (Ultratop 50 Flanders)	27
Canada Retail Singles (The Record)	7
Canada Contemporary Hit Radio (The Record)	5
Canada Top Singles (RPM)	6
Canada Dance/Urban (RPM)	2
Europe (Eurochart Hot 100)	48
Ireland (IRMA)	14
Luxembourg (Radio Luxembourg)	13
Netherlands (Dutch Top 40 Tipparade)	3
Netherlands (Single Top 100)	35
New Zealand (Recorded Music NZ)	28
UK Singles (Official Charts)	20
US Billboard Hot 100	4
US Dance Club Songs (Billboard)	1
US Dance Singles Sales (Billboard)	2
US Hot R&B/Hip-Hop Songs (Billboard)	2
US Cash Box Top 100	4
US Contemporary Hit Radio (Radio & Records)	2
US Urban (Radio & Records)	1
West Germany (GfK)	43

Chart (1996)	Peak position
Australia (ARIA)	100

=== Year-end charts ===
Chart (1990)	Position
Canada Top Singles (RPM)	40
Canada Dance/Urban (RPM)	14
US Billboard Hot 100	44
US 12-inch Singles Sales (Billboard)	17
US Dance Club Play (Billboard)	26
US Hot R&B Singles (Billboard)	56
US Cash Box Top 100	35
US Contemporary Hit Radio (Radio & Records)	19
US Urban (Radio & Records)	50

== Certifications ==
Region	Certification	Certified units/sales
United States (RIAA)	Gold	500,000^{^}
^{^} Shipments figures based on certification alone.

== Release history ==
Region	Date	Format(s)	Label(s)	Ref.
United States	March 4, 1990	7-inch vinyl; 12-inch vinyl; cassette	A&M	
Japan	April 21, 1990	Mini-CD	A&M	
Japan	May 21, 1990	Maxi-CD	A&M	
United Kingdom	June 25, 1990	7-inch vinyl; 12-inch vinyl; CD; cassette	A&M; Breakout	
United Kingdom	February 26, 1996	12-inch vinyl	A&M; AM:PM	
