= Janet Jackson's Rhythm Nation 1814 =

Studio album by Janet Jackson
- Released: September 18, 1989
- Recorded: September 1988 – May 1989
- Studios: Flyte Tyme (Minneapolis, Minnesota)
- Genres: Pop; R&B; new jack swing; funk
- Length: 64:34
- Label: A&M
- Producers: John McClain (exec.); Jimmy Jam and Terry Lewis; Janet Jackson; Jellybean Johnson

Janet Jackson chronology
Control: The Remixes (1987)	Janet Jackson's Rhythm Nation 1814 (1989)	Janet (1993)

Singles from Janet Jackson's Rhythm Nation 1814
- 1. "Miss You Much" Released: August 16, 1989; 2. "Rhythm Nation" Released: October 23, 1989; 3. "Escapade" Released: January 8, 1990; 4. "Come Back to Me" Released: January 15, 1990; 5. "Alright" Released: March 4, 1990; 6. "Black Cat" Released: June 25, 1990; 7. "Love Will Never Do (Without You)" Released: October 2, 1990; 8. "State of the World" Released: February 6, 1991

Janet Jackson's Rhythm Nation 1814 (also simply known as Rhythm Nation 1814 or Rhythm Nation) is the fourth studio album by American singer Janet Jackson, first released on September 18, 1989, in the United Kingdom, then one day later in North America by A&M Records. Although label executives wanted material resembling her previous album, Control (1986), Jackson insisted on creating a concept album addressing social issues. Collaborating with songwriters and record producers Jimmy Jam and Terry Lewis, she drew inspiration from various tragedies reported through news media, exploring racism, poverty, and substance abuse, alongside themes of romance. Although its central concept of a sociopolitical utopia received mixed reactions, its composition was critically acclaimed. Jackson became considered a role model for youth because of her socially conscious lyrics.

As with Control, recording of Rhythm Nation 1814 took place at Lewis and Jam's Flyte Tyme Studios in Minneapolis, Minnesota, where they worked in seclusion with Jackson to complete the album. Noted for its use of sampling and its use of heavily swung synthesized percussion throughout its production, the record encompasses a variety of musical styles, such as new jack swing, hard rock, pop, dance, and industrial music. Songs range from mechanized dance rhythms to soft ballads, giving it appeal across multiple radio formats. It is the only album in the history of the US Billboard Hot 100 singles chart to have seven commercial singles peak in the top five positions. It is also the first album to produce number-one hits on the chart in three separate calendar years, beginning with "Miss You Much" in 1989, "Escapade" and "Black Cat" in 1990, and culminating with "Love Will Never Do (Without You)" in 1991.

Rhythm Nation 1814 became Jackson's second consecutive album to top the Billboard 200 albums chart in the United States and was certified 6× Platinum by the Recording Industry Association of America (RIAA). It became the best-selling album of 1990 in the United States and has sold an estimated 12 million copies worldwide. Due to its innovative production and lyrical exploration, critics have come to regard it as the pinnacle of Jackson's artistic achievement. Music scholars note the record garnered her a level of cross-cultural appeal unmatched by industry peers. Considered a "landmark" album, it has also been cited as an influence in the work of numerous musical artists, setting stylistic trends in the years following its release.

Visuals in music videos and live performances further elevated Jackson's superstardom. The 30-minute film Rhythm Nation 1814, which depicts two aspiring musicians whose lives are disrupted by substance abuse, aired on MTV to promote the album. Jackson's Rhythm Nation World Tour 1990 became the most successful debut concert tour by a recording artist at the time. She was regarded as a fashion icon, with various outfits from the album's promotional tour and music videos being emulated by young fans. Jackson received nine Grammy Award nominations, becoming the first woman to be nominated for Producer of the Year and winning Best Long Form Music Video for Rhythm Nation 1814. Jackson received the MTV Video Vanguard Award and a star on the Hollywood Walk of Fame for her significant contributions to popular culture. Her handwritten lyrics to the album's title track "Rhythm Nation" as well as her militaristic uniform for its music video have been preserved by the Rock and Roll Hall of Fame. In 2021, the Library of Congress selected the album for preservation in the National Recording Registry as part of the class of 2020, deeming it "culturally, historically, or aesthetically significant." In 2026, the album was inducted into the Grammy Hall of Fame.

== Background ==
Following the critical and commercial breakthrough of her third studio album Control (1986), Jackson was motivated to take a larger role in her album's creative process. According to Billboard's Hottest Hot 100 Hits (2002), A&M Records requested she record an album similar to Control. It was rumored that label executives suggested a concept album titled Scandal, which would have centered on her personal and family life. However, Jam later denied the claim that Scandal was ever suggested, although he confirmed there was encouragement to produce a "Control II". Jackson opposed the idea of a direct sequel to Control, stating "that's what I didn't want to do. I wanted to do something that I really believed in and that I really felt strong about." She was initially criticized for centering the album on social consciousness, but remained committed. Jam stated that her inspiration came primarily from watching CNN and other news sources. In particular, her reaction to the Stockton playground murders led to recording "Livin' in a World (They Didn't Make)", "Rhythm Nation" and "State of the World".

While discussing the origin of the title "Rhythm Nation", Jackson stated she first uttered the phrase during a conversation with her producers. "I thought it would be great if we could create our own nation," adding that it would be "one that would have a positive message and that everyone would be free to join." She based the idea on the prevalence of various youth groups and organizations formed to create a common identity. The use of the number "1814" represents the year the national anthem "The Star-Spangled Banner" was written. Rolling Stone emphasized that the core concept is further explored in the album's opening pledge (the first track of the recording), which states: "We are a nation with no geographic boundaries, bound together through our beliefs. We are like-minded individuals, sharing a common vision, pushing toward a world rid of color-lines." Several critics noted that "R" (Rhythm) and "N" (Nation) are the eighteenth and fourteenth letters of the alphabet, though Jackson said this was coincidental.

Jackson's primary goal for the record was to reach a younger audience who may have been unaware of what it means to be socially conscious people. She expressed: "I wanted to capture their attention through my music." She was influenced by other musical acts such as Joni Mitchell, Bob Dylan, Tracy Chapman, and U2, although she felt their music appealed primarily to adults who were already invested in social change. She also stated, "I'm not naive—I know an album or a song can't change the world. I just want my music and my dance to catch the audience's attention" hoping it would motivate people to "make some sort of difference".

== Composition and production ==
Rhythm Nation 1814 was recorded over seven months. Its production took place at Flyte Tyme studios in Minneapolis, Minnesota, with the majority of the album recorded in the winter of 1988. According to Jam, he, Lewis and Jackson chose to isolate themselves to compose the record. No one from A&M Records was invited to the studio to observe, and label executives complied with the request. The trio co-authored six of the album's songs: "Rhythm Nation", "State of the World", "Alright", "Escapade", "Come Back to Me" and "Someday Is Tonight". Five of the six remaining songs for the record, "The Knowledge", "Miss You Much", "Love Will Never Do (Without You)", "Livin' in a World (They Didn't Make)" and "Lonely" were penned by Jam and Lewis, while "Black Cat" was written solely by Jackson. She co-produced the album with Jam and Lewis, while John McClain served as executive producer; the song "Black Cat" was produced by Jellybean Johnson.

The LP was produced primarily using synthesizers and drum machines. Before its recording, Jam and Lewis had begun to update their equipment for Flyte Tyme studios, experimenting with different types of drum machines and keyboards. While Control had been recorded primarily using the LinnDrum machine, songs for Rhythm Nation 1814 were mostly recorded using the E-mu SP-1200, which was more common in hip-hop music at the time. The Oberheim OB-8 analog synthesizer, as well as those made by Sequential Circuits, were also used for mixing and recording. The only equipment used on Control that was also used to produce Rhythm Nation 1814 was the Ensoniq Mirage keyboard. The instrumental tracks for "Miss You Much", "Love Will Never Do (Without You)" and "Escapade" were among the first to be recorded, considered follow-ups to the "beat-heavy, catchy songs" that Jackson, Jam and Lewis crafted on Control which "defined the punch and power of 1980s dance and pop music."

'Rhythm Nation'
"Rhythm Nation" features a sample loop and a triplet swing beat, while vocals for the song alternate between octave singing and spoken-verse rapping. The song is built upon a sample of "Thank You (Falettinme Be Mice Elf Agin)" by Sly and the Family Stone.

"Black Cat"
The hard rock song "Black Cat" was a notable departure from Jackson's usual sound. It was recorded using a Rockman and Marshall amplifier for a heavy metal effect.

Jam noted that it was common for Jackson to sing her vocals with the base track first and then have the rest of the song built around it in order to make her voice the center of the track. "Janet did all of her background vocals and not just the lead vocals. The idea with her has always been that she does all of her own vocals, so that it's totally a Janet record." On the title track "Rhythm Nation", her vocals range from B♭_{3} to A_{5}, climaxing within its middle eight. Musicologist Richard J. Ripani observed the album and title track showcased a variety of contemporary R&B styles, making "use of elements across the R&B spectrum, including a sample loop ("Rhythm Nation" samples "Thank You (Falettinme Be Mice Elf Agin)" by Sly and the Family Stone), triplet swing, rapped vocal parts and blues notes (D naturals and G naturals)." This style of music, known as new jack swing, was immensely popular in the late 1980s and early 1990s. Though officially credited to the production techniques of Teddy Riley, Ripani theorized Riley was influenced by Jackson's 1986 single "Nasty", which also features a distinctive triplet swing. Jon Pareles observed the album's diversity suited a wide variety of radio formats, including pop, quiet storm, Adult contemporary and mainstream rock. "Black Cat" was a standout for the record, not only for being composed exclusively by Jackson, but for its stark departure from her general style of music, delving into hard rock. While Jellybean Johnson was chosen to produce it, Dave Berry was recruited to play guitar for the song. It was recorded using a Rockman and a Marshall amplifier to give the song a heavy metal sound.

The sequencing of the record's track listing was done strategically, starting with songs that lyrically depict societal injustices and ending with those that explore love, relationships and sexuality. This decision also factored into the album's artwork and marketing, giving it overtly militant black-and-white imagery. Jam explained that "[t]he idea of putting 'Rhythm Nation', 'State of the World' and 'The Knowledge' as the first three songs on the record really set the tone as to what the record was. Then to have the segue after that where she says, 'Get the point? Good. Let's dance ...' and then go into 'Miss You Much', that was purposely done." He also stated that the safer marketing strategy for the project would have been "a beautiful colored picture of Janet on the cover" with Escapade as its title, starting the track listing with "Miss You Much", "Love Will Never Do (Without You)" and "Escapade", and ending it with "Livin' in a World (They Didn't Make)", "The Knowledge" and "Rhythm Nation" but noted that despite being the same collection of songs, the alternate sequencing and imagery would not have had the same impact. Of its lyrical themes, Kate Kelly stated the album "reveals a social conscience speaking of getting an education, avoiding drugs, and feeding the homeless. All this might seem a little heavy for dance music or pop radio, but Jackson fuses her concepts with driving dance energy that hits the hearts of those on the dance floor." Andrew Barker of Variety described it as "a quasi-concept album whose opening three songs directly addressed crime, the crack epidemic, racism, homelessness and youth illiteracy — not exactly a recipe for a party. And yet the record was somehow even more successful than Control, generating a then-record seven top-five singles."

== Promotion and videography ==
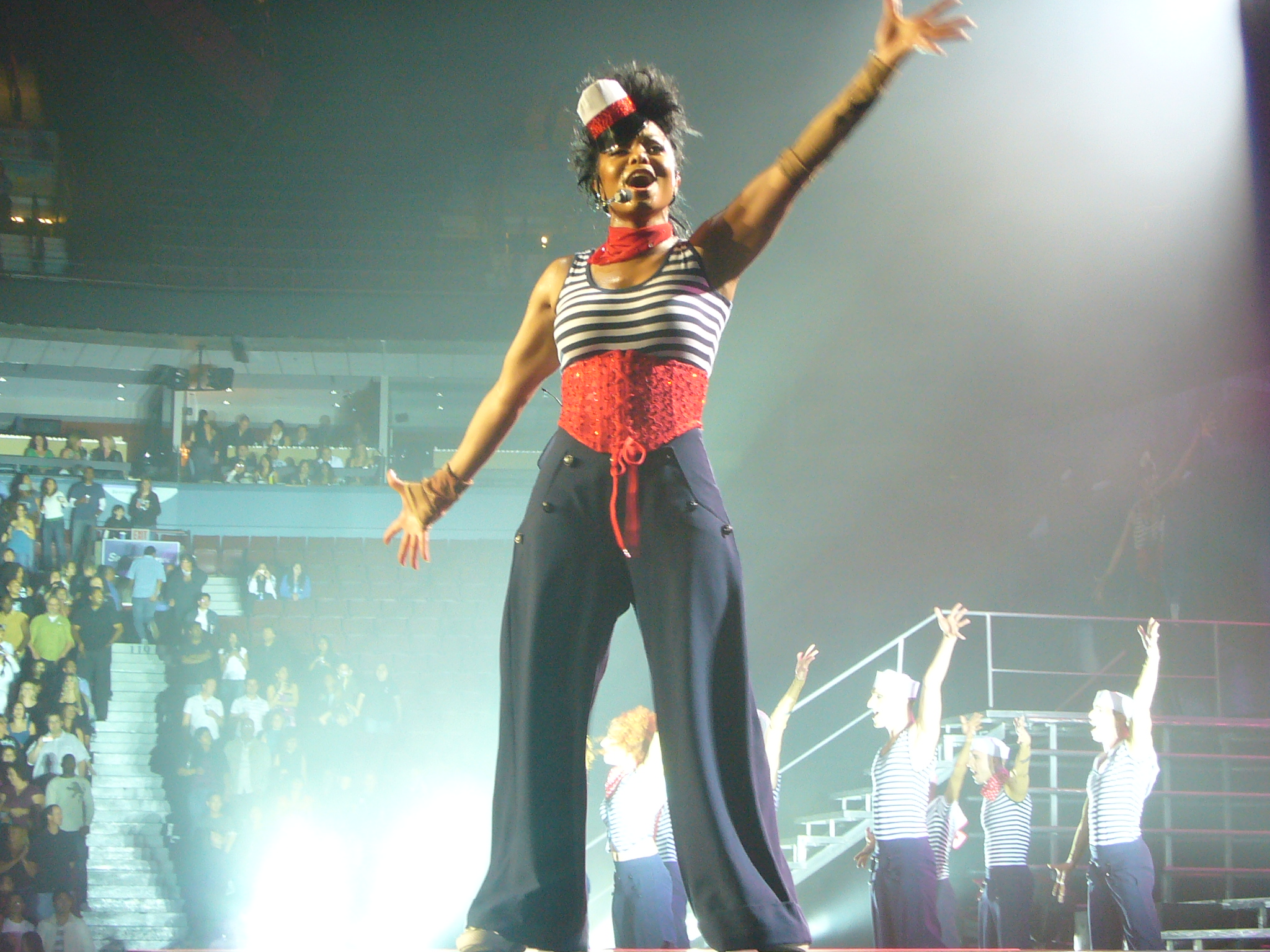
Jackson performing the album's lead single, "Miss You Much", during her 2008 Rock Witchu Tour.

After the release of the album's lead single "Miss You Much", A&M Records issued a press release for the record, announcing that social themes would "run throughout much of the material". Jackson performed "Rhythm Nation" on several television shows internationally, including Top of the Pops and a Royal Variety Performance. She also performed a controversial rendition of "Black Cat" at the 1990 MTV Video Music Awards in which she tore open her snapped blouse; although this was routine for performances of the song in concert, it was considered to have "ushered in a new era of sexual spontaneity" for the singer and viewed as the first "shocking" performance of her career.

A 30-minute short film, Rhythm Nation 1814, was produced as a visual companion for the album. Referred to as a "telemusical", the storyline incorporates three separate music videos: "Miss You Much", "The Knowledge", and "Rhythm Nation". Jackson and director Dominic Sena developed the screenplay, which centers around two boys whose dreams of pursuing music careers are destroyed through substance abuse and drug trafficking. Sena referred to the film as the "1814 Project", attempting to keep the public unaware that Jackson was filming on the streets of Los Angeles. The project had a budget of $1.6 million, and was aired on MTV prior to the album's release. A&M co-founder Jerry Moss stated that the decision to film the composite videos all at once for Rhythm Nation 1814 regardless of budget was "a brilliant way to go" allotting Jackson more time to focus her attention elsewhere.

Parallel Lines: Media Representations of Dance (1993) observed that in Rhythm Nation 1814, Jackson represents a "modern good fairy" attempting to guide troubled youth to a more positive way of life. Each of the three segments serves a different purpose, beginning with affinity and companionship in "Miss You Much", followed by anger and frustration in her rooftop solo and ending with "Rhythm Nation", in which Jackson and her dancers "have become a uniformed, formidable army, whose controlled energetic moves and shouts project a disciplined resolution to inspire others through dance and music." Their group dynamic visually depicts a gender-neutral equality, with Jackson "performing asexually and anonymously in front of, but as one of the members of the group." It is also noted that the success of the film is not only the final product, but in the commercial and social implications of its development. In selecting an unknown street dancer, Anthony Thomas, to develop her choreography, "Janet Jackson secures a threefold achievement: she satisfies the dictates of the commercial pop music industry by creating a dance image which is significantly different from her earlier work; she demonstrates that, despite fame, she is still in touch with contemporary youth pop culture and its fashions; and finally, she [uses] not the dance traditions of Hollywood musical ... but the work of a young black man whose training is outside the institutions of Western theater and clearly an Afro-American cultural expression of the late 1980s." The film received a positive reception. Jefferson Graham in USA Today commented that "she dances up a storm in the moody black-and-white video's three songs ... and plays the role of a mystical figure to young kids." Jon Pareles remarked that "[it] juxtaposes her dance routines with grim urban imagery and a plot line about drugs versus dreams." It was also released on VHS and LaserDisc. Jackson received two MTV Music Video Award nominations for "Best Dance Video" and "Best Choreography" for "Rhythm Nation" at the 1990 MTV Video Music Awards, winning the latter.

Five other music videos were produced to promote the album's singles. While the video for "Black Cat" was taken from live footage of Jackson's concerts, those for "Escapade" and "Alright" used a Broadway-influenced production. The video for "Alright" was an homage to choreographer Michael Kidd, who was asked to participate in the project and also featured appearances by the flash dancing Nicholas Brothers, actress Cyd Charisse and bandleader Cab Calloway. An extended version of the video also features rapper Heavy D. The somber video for "Come Back to Me" was filmed near the Eiffel Tower in Paris, France. Similarly, "Love Will Never Do (Without You)" was a notable departure from the typically elaborate choreography associated with Jackson's other videos, focusing on her as an individual rather than as part of a dance troupe. Featuring appearances by Antonio Sabàto Jr. and Djimon Hounsou, the sandy beach setting exemplifies director Herb Ritts's "signature style through its use of graceful movements, bold contrasts, and wide-open spaces." The music video is also regarded as the origin of what would later become Jackson's sexually overt persona, freely displaying her legs, torso and cleavage, and touching her own bare skin and Sabàto Jr.'s in a sensual manner. In Present Tense: Rock & Roll and Culture (1992), Anthony DeCurtis states that "[t]he video celebrates hedonism and voyeurism; there are languorous displays of Jackson's body in ripped jeans and brief top, and of several muscular male bodies, black and white, with bare arms, and chests." She received the MTV Video Vanguard Award in 1990, regarded as MTV's highest honor for artists whose videography has significantly impacted pop culture.

A video compilation, titled The Rhythm Nation Compilation, was released on VHS and LaserDisc on November 29, 1990, and has been certified double platinum by the Recording Industry Association of America (RIAA) for shipments of 200,000 units. Excluding "State of the World", it includes the music videos for all the album's singles, including the extended cut for "Alright", as well as a prologue and epilogue.

== Rhythm Nation World Tour 1990 ==
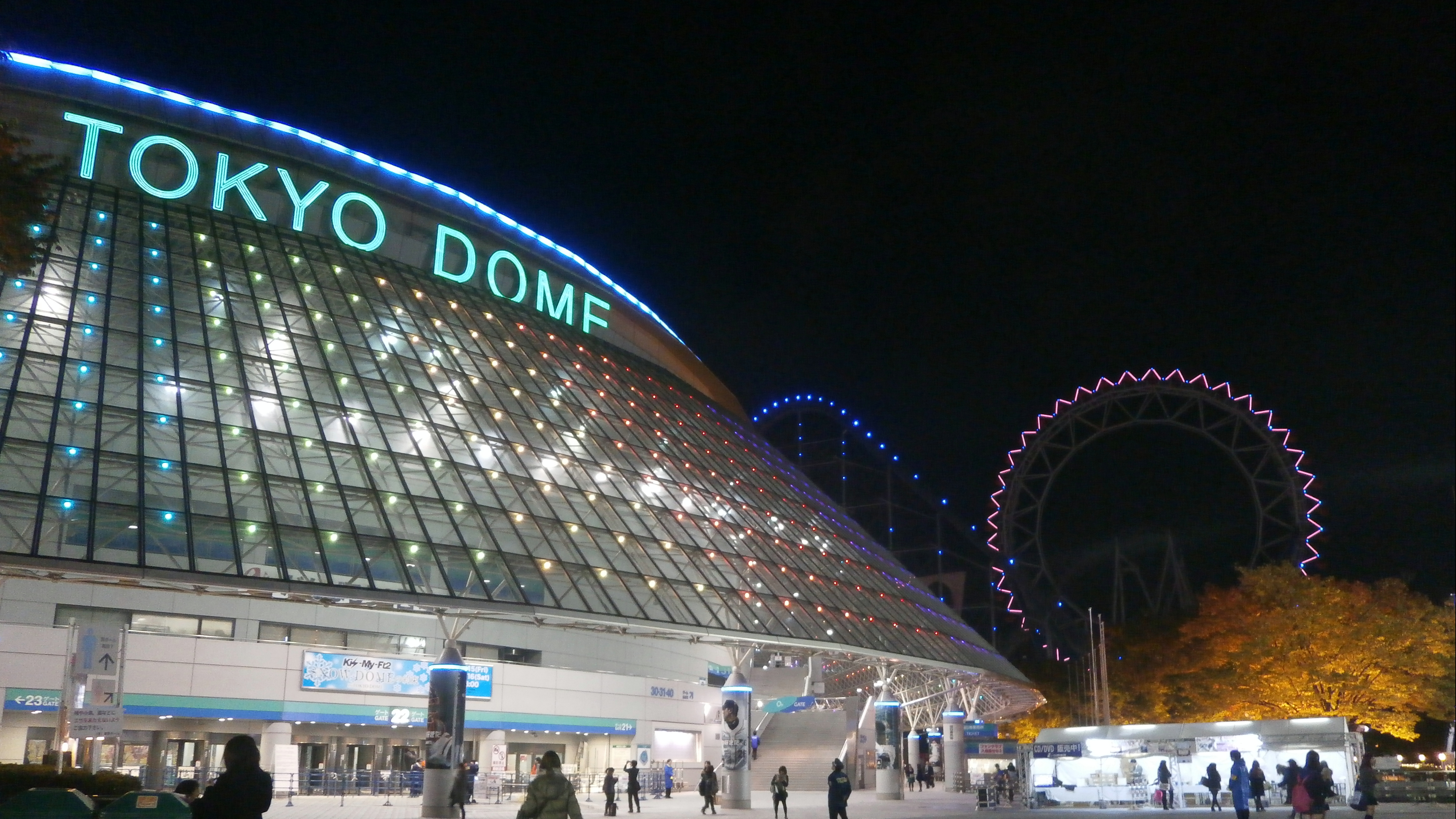
Jackson's Rhythm Nation World Tour 1990 set a record for the fastest sellout of Japan's Tokyo Dome.

The Rhythm Nation World Tour 1990 was Jackson's debut concert tour. Described as "an elaborately choreographed spectacle", it aimed to recreate the award-winning, innovative music videos of Rhythm Nation 1814 and those of its predecessor, Control. Anthony Thomas served as the tour's main choreographer, while Chuckii Booker became its musical director and opening act. She was assisted by a team of eleven musicians, five backup singers, and six dancers. Jackson's total production and staging reportedly cost $2 million. In addition to Jackson's choreography, the tour was reported to portray "dazzling lighting effects and pyrotechnics", as well as stage illusions, in which Jackson was transformed into a leopard on stage.

Writing for Time magazine, Jay Cocks observed the show to integrate "sleek high-tech and smooth dance rhythms into an evening of snazzy soul with a social conscience." Chris Willman of the Los Angeles Times remarked that Jackson's choreography "represents the pinnacle of what can be done in the popping 'n' locking style—a rapid-fire mixture of rigidly jerky and gracefully fluid movements." Several critics noted Jackson lip synced portions of the show, in a similar fashion to her contemporaries. Jon Pareles commented, "most lip-synced shows are done by video-era pop performers whose audiences are young and television trained. They fill arenas to enjoy a spectacle like what they saw on television—the dancing ... the stage effects and incidentally the songs." Michael MacCambridge considered it a "moot point" stating, "Jackson was frequently singing along with her own prerecorded vocals, to achieve a sound closer to radio versions of singles."

The tour became the most successful debut concert tour in history, with an attendance of over two million. It also set a record for the fastest sellout of Japan's Tokyo Dome, selling out in seven minutes. Jackson became the only female artist other than Madonna to fill arenas at the time. It was ranked the fifth most successful tour of 1990, making her the only female artist to place within the top 10. It also solidified her reputation as a fashion icon, as fans imitated her "Rhythm Nation" outfit and regalia. Ebony magazine reported "hordes of teen girls were imitating her distinctive look—black quasi-military long jackets, black tight-tight pants, and big white shirts." Joel Selvin of the San Francisco Chronicle wrote "the 23-year-old has been making smash hit records for four years, becoming a fixture on MTV and a major role model to teenage girls across the country." More than $450,000 in proceeds from the tour's Madison Square Garden show were used to establish the Rhythm Nation scholarship program. The annual scholarship awards $5,000 to students majoring in performing arts and communications at United Negro College Fund member colleges and universities. William Allen, then-executive vice president of the UNCF, remarked: "Jackson is a role model for all young people to emulate and the message she has gotten to the young people of this country through the lyrics of 'Rhythm Nation 1814' is having positive effects."

== Singles ==
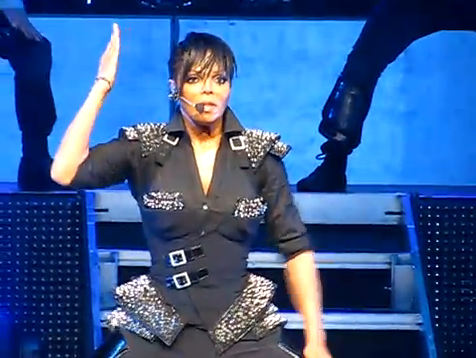
Jackson performing the album's title track, "Rhythm Nation", during her 2011 Number Ones, Up Close and Personal tour.

Rhythm Nation 1814 produced a record-setting seven top-five hit singles on the Billboard Hot 100. With lead single "Miss You Much", along with "Escapade", "Black Cat" and the album's final single "Love Will Never Do (Without You)", it also yielded four number-one hits. "Miss You Much" topped the chart for four weeks. It also topped the Hot Dance Club Songs and Hot R&B/Hip-Hop Songs charts. The single was certified platinum by the RIAA. It also reached number two in Canada and New Zealand, number one in Japanese airplay and South Africa, number twelve in Australia, the top 15 in Belgium and the Netherlands, the top 20 in Germany, Sweden, and Switzerland, and number twenty-two on the United Kingdom singles chart, as well as charting in Brazil. According to Radio & Records, "Miss You Much" was the biggest airplay hit of the year. It sold more than four million copies worldwide, and became the year's second-best-selling single behind Phil Collins's "Another Day in Paradise".

"Rhythm Nation" peaked at number two, behind "Another Day in Paradise". It peaked atop Hot R&B/Hip-Hop Songs and Hot Dance Club Songs. The single was certified gold by the RIAA. It reached number six in Canada, two in Japanese airplay and South Africa, eleven in the Netherlands, fifteen in Belgium, the top 20 of New Zealand and Sweden, and the top 25 of Switzerland, Poland, and the United Kingdom. "Escapade" topped the Hot 100, as well as the Hot R&B/Hip-Hop Songs and Hot Dance Club Songs. It was certified gold in May 1990. It reached number one in Canada and Japanese airplay, four in South Africa, ten in Sweden and Belgium, thirteen in the Netherlands, seventeen in the United Kingdom, and twenty-three in Germany. The single version of "Alright" featuring additional vocals from rapper Heavy D peaked at number four on the Hot 100 and Hot Dance Club Songs, while reaching number two on Hot R&B/Hip-Hop Songs. It was certified gold in June 1990. It reached number six in Canada, three in South Africa, and number one in Japanese airplay. "Come Back to Me" peaked at number two on the Hot 100. It reached number three in Canada, as well as number one in Japanese airplay and South Africa, and the top 20 in Poland, Sweden, and the United Kingdom.

"Black Cat" topped the Hot 100 and received gold certification. It reached number four in Canada and three in Japanese airplay, five in Norway, six in Australia, the top 10 in Sweden, France, and Switzerland, the top 15 in the United Kingdom, the top 20 in Belgium, and twenty-one in the Netherlands. "Love Will Never Do (Without You)" was released as the album's seventh and final commercial single. It reached number one on January 19, 1991, topping the chart for one week. It reached number one in Canada and Japanese airplay, and two in South Africa. The single was certified gold by the RIAA. Lastly, "State of the World" was issued solely for radio airplay, making it ineligible to chart. It reached number five on the Hot 100 Airplay (Radio Songs) chart. Billboard noted it likely would have been the album's eighth top five hit if a commercial product had been distributed.

== Critical reception ==
Professional ratings
Review scores
Source	Rating
AllMusic	4.5/5 stars
Chicago Tribune	3.5/4 stars
The Guardian	5/5 stars
Los Angeles Times	3/5 stars
NME	6/10
Pitchfork	9.0/10
Q	3/5 stars
Rolling Stone	4/5 stars
Slant Magazine	5/5 stars
The Village Voice	A−

The album received generally positive reviews, though Jackson's social and political themes received mixed reactions. Dennis Hunt of the Los Angeles Times called it "intriguing" and diverse, ranging from "social commentary to sensual, sensual tunes, from dance music to songs laced with jazz and Brazilian textures." Vince Aletti of Rolling Stone likened Jackson's themes to a politician, "abandoning the narrow 'I' for the universal 'we' and inviting us to do the same." Aletti complimented Jackson's balance of "despair with optimism, anger with hope", incorporated within its theme of social progress. Andy Ellis-Widders of Keyboard considered it "a powerful statement on racial integration, social accountability, and personal integrity." In a review for The Boston Globe, Steve Morse compared its success to that of Aerosmith and Billy Joel, declaring it "a dance record with a ruthlessly frank social conscience that addresses drugs, homelessness, illiteracy and teen runaways. She's reached far beyond dance music's fluffy image to unite even serious rockers and rappers who usually look the other way." Michael Snyder of the San Francisco Chronicle considered it a worthy successor to Jackson's previous album Control, adding "a little sociopolitical substance" as she "bounces between the two extremes of romance and generalized, politically correct topicality."

Writing for The New York Times, Jon Pareles viewed Rhythm Nation 1814 as having been "thoroughly calculated" for massive commercial success, noting that, as with Pink Floyd's The Dark Side of the Moon (1973) and Guns N' Roses' Appetite for Destruction (1987), consumers might find that "[b]uying the album can mean endorsing an attitude ... the album becomes a cause without a rebellion." Pareles commended its musicality and vocals, stating "[t]he tone of the music is airless, sealing out imprecision and reveling in crisp, machine-generated rhythms; Ms. Jackson's piping voice, layered upon itself in punchy unisons or lavish harmonies, never cracks or falters." Robert Christgau wrote in his review for The Village Voice, "Her voice is as unequal to her vaguely admonitory politics as it was to her declaration of sexual availability, but the music is the message."

In 1990, the album earned Grammy Award nominations for "Best Female R&B Vocal Performance" and "Best Rhythm & Blues Song" for "Miss You Much", and "Best Instrumental Arrangement Accompanying Vocalist" and "Best Long Form Music Video" for "Rhythm Nation", winning the latter award at the 32nd Annual Grammy Awards. Jackson was also nominated for "Producer of the Year, Non-Classical", becoming the first woman to be nominated for the award. The following year, Jackson received nominations for "Best Female Rock Vocal Performance" for "Black Cat", in addition to "Best Rhythm & Blues Song" and "Best R&B Vocal Performance, Female" for "Alright" at the 33rd Annual Grammy Awards.

Retrospective reviews continue to assess the album favorably. Eric Henderson of Slant Magazine declared the album a "masterpiece". Henderson also praised its diversity, stating: "She was more credibly feminine, more crucially masculine, more viably adult, more believably childlike. This was, of course, critical to a project in which Janet assumed the role of mouthpiece for a nationless, multicultural utopia." Though referring to Jackson's voice as "wafer-thin", Alex Henderson of AllMusic applauded Jackson's spirit and enthusiasm, praising the album's numerous "gems". Henderson regarded it "an even higher artistic plateau" than her prior album, adding: "For those purchasing their first Janet Jackson release, Rhythm Nation would be an even wiser investment than Control—and that's saying a lot." Alexis Petridis of The Guardian described the album as a more "grandiose" counterpart to Control, "tough, funky and driving – the second of a perfect pair."

=== Accolades ===
Organization	Country	Award	Year	Ref.
Parents' Choice Foundation	United States	Parents' Choice Award	1989	
American Music Awards	United States	Favorite Dance Artist, Favorite Pop/Rock Female Artist, Favorite Soul/R&B Female Artist, Favorite Dance Single ("Miss You Much"), Favorite Soul/R&B Song ("Miss You Much")	1990– 91	
Billboard Music Awards	United States	Top Hot 100 Singles Artist of the Year, Top Selling Album of the Year, Top Selling R&B Album of the Year, Top Selling R&B Albums Artist of the Year, Top Selling R&B Artist of the Year, Top Dance Club Play Artist of the Year, Top Hot Dance 12" Singles Sales Artist of the Year	1990	
Billboard's Tanqueray Sterling Music Video Awards	United States	Best Female Video Artist, Black/Rap, Best Female Artist, Dance, Director's Award, Black/Rap (Rhythm Nation 1814), Director's Award, Dance ("Alright"), Tanqueray Sterling Music Video Award for Artistic Achievement (Rhythm Nation 1814 Film)	1990	
MTV Music Video Awards	United States	Best Choreography ("Rhythm Nation"), Video Vanguard Award	1990	
Grammy Awards	United States	Best Music Video, Long Form (Rhythm Nation 1814 Film)	1990	
Rolling Stone	United States	"Women Who Rock: The 50 Greatest Albums of All Time" — No. 26	2002	
Quintessence Editions Ltd.	United Kingdom	1001 Albums You Must Hear Before You Die	2003	
Rolling Stone	United States	The 500 Greatest Albums of All Time — No. 275	2003	
Entertainment Weekly	United States	The 100 Best Albums of the Past 25 Years — No. 54	2007	
Rolling Stone	United States	The 500 Greatest Albums of All Time — No. 277	2012	
Slant Magazine	United States	"Best Albums of the '80s" — No. 43	2012	
Spin	United States	"The 300 Best Albums of the Past 30 Years (1985–2014)" — No. 54	2014	
Pitchfork	United States	"The 200 Best Albums of the 1980s" — No. 30	2018	
Rolling Stone	United States	The 500 Greatest Albums of All Time — No. 339	2020	
Cleveland.com	United States	"The 80 Greatest Albums of the 1980s by Rock Hall Inductees" (ranked 58)	2020	

== Commercial performance ==
The album debuted at number twenty-eight on the Billboard 200 and eighty-seven on Top R&B/Hip-Hop Albums, eventually reaching the number one position on both charts. It topped the Billboard 200 for four consecutive weeks, selling three million copies within the first four months of its release. It sold an additional 1.10 million through BMG Music Club. In November 1989, the Recording Industry Association of America (RIAA) certified the album gold. It was certified double platinum by the end of the year and ultimately certified sixfold platinum by the RIAA. It emerged as the best selling album of 1990 in the territory. As of September 2014, the album has sold over 7 million copies in the US.

Internationally, the album reached number one in Australia, where it was certified double platinum by the Australian Recording Industry Association (ARIA), and South Africa. In Canada, it entered the top five and was certified platinum. The album peaked at number four on the United Kingdom albums chart, receiving a platinum certification. It also entered the top 10 of Japan and New Zealand, where it was certified double platinum and gold. It reached the top 25 of Sweden, as well as the top thirty in the Netherlands and Germany. It also received gold certifications in Switzerland and Hong Kong. It has sold an estimated 12 million copies worldwide. The Rhythm Nation 1814 video compilation and its reissue were each certified double platinum in the United States.

== Legacy ==
The commercial success of Rhythm Nation 1814 was an unexpected achievement for mainstream pop music. Although Jackson was told focusing her album's theme on social consciousness would negatively impact sales, it was "a prediction soon proved wrong when the album was certified multi-platinum" and subsequently topped the pop, R&B and dance music charts. In She Bop II: The Definitive History of Women in Rock, Pop and Soul (2003), Lucy O'Brien wrote that contrary to A&M's fear that the album would underperform, its multi-platinum sales pushed Jackson to a level of stardom, calling it a "personal manifesto" and regarding it as a female counterpart to Marvin Gaye's What's Going On (1971). Timothy E. Scheurer, author of Born in the USA: The Myth of America in Popular Music from Colonial Times to the Present (2007), wrote that the album "may remind some of Sly Stone prior to There's a Riot Going On and other African-American artists of the 1970s in its tacit assumption that the world imagined by Dr. King is still possible, that the American Dream is a dream for all people." It made history as the only album to generate seven top-five hits on the Billboard Hot 100, Bruce Springsteen's Born in the U.S.A. (1984), which has seven top 10 hits. It is also the first album to achieve number-one hits in three separate calendar years, with "Miss You Much" in 1989, "Escapade" and "Black Cat" in 1990, and "Love Will Never Do (Without You)" in 1991. This feat would subsequently be matched by The Weeknd's After Hours in 2021. Additionally, it is one of only ten albums—alongside Michael Jackson's Bad (1987), Saturday Night Fever: The Original Movie Sound Track (1977), Whitney Houston's Whitney (1987), George Michael's Faith (1987), Paula Abdul's Forever Your Girl (1989), Mariah Carey's self-titled debut (1990), Usher's Confessions (2004) and Katy Perry's Teenage Dream (2010)—to produce a minimum of four number ones.

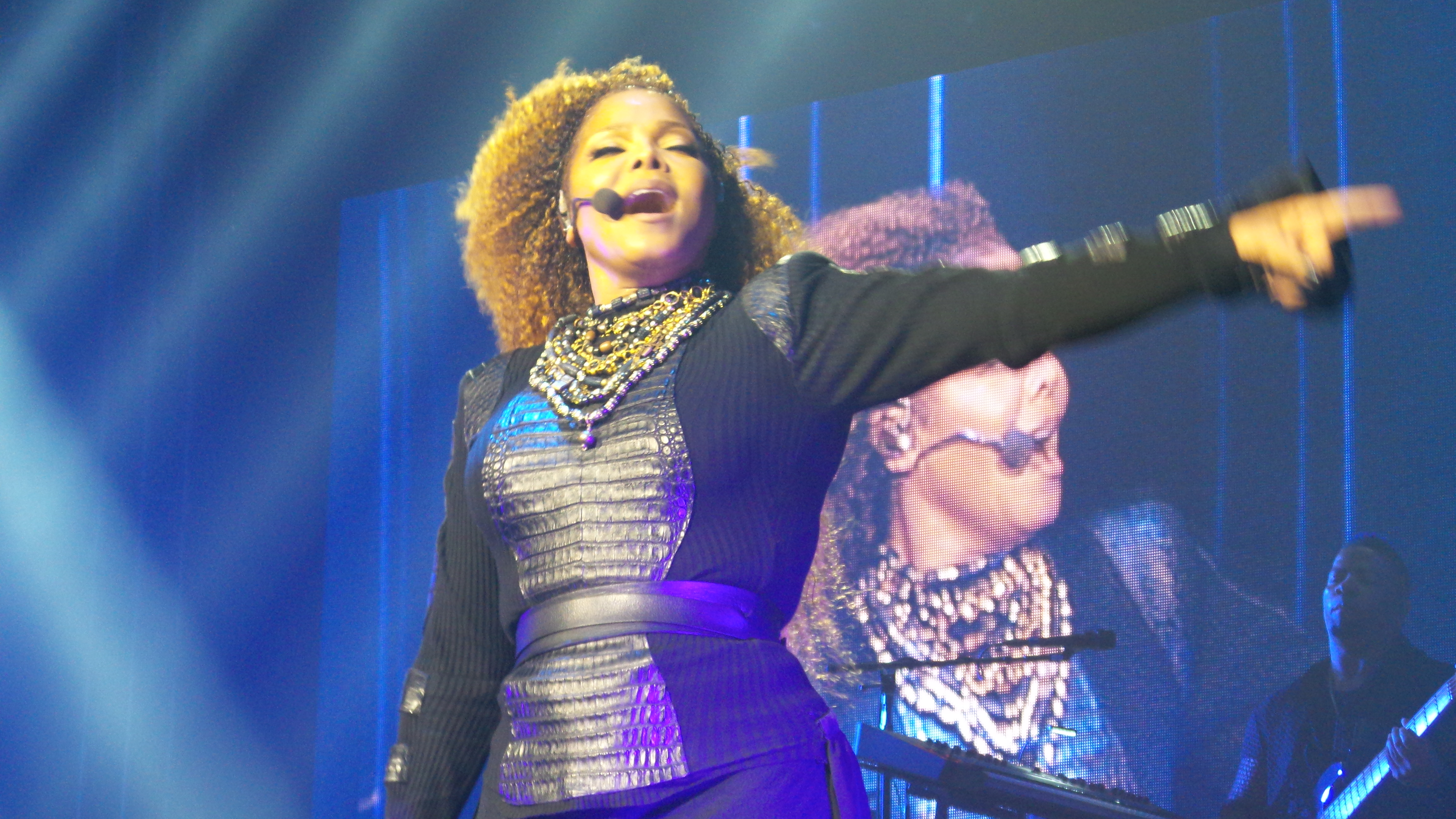
Jackson singing "Love Will Never Do (Without You)" during her 2015–16 Unbreakable World Tour. The song became the final of seven top five singles released from Rhythm Nation 1814.

Aside from its commercial performance, the album's composition has continued to receive acclaim for its sonic innovation. Upon its 25th anniversary, music critic and scholar Joseph Vogel observed that when viewed "as a complete artistic statement, Rhythm Nation 1814 was a stunning achievement. It married the pleasures of pop with the street energy and edge of hip-hop." Kyle Anderson of Entertainment Weekly asserted the record "has barely aged—it sounds as rich and vital as it did when it was first released, and stylistically as contemporary as anything on the Billboard charts." Anderson also underscores that it pioneered several musical trends, citing records by pop and R&B artists including Rihanna, Pink, Beyoncé, Frank Ocean, Gwen Stefani, The Weeknd, Lady Gaga, Jhené Aiko, Miguel, Christina Aguilera, FKA Twigs, and Tinashe that have exhibited similarities to the "landmark" album. Its single for "Alright" featuring Heavy D made Jackson the first pop artist to team with a rapper, "setting the trend for future pop and hip-hop collaborations." Additionally, "Black Cat" set a precedent for female pop stars segueing into glam metal. Its impact also extends to indie and alternative rock music, with School of Seven Bells, A Sunny Day in Glasgow, and Alexis Krauss of Sleigh Bells citing the album as an influence in their work. MTV's Brenna Ehrlich remarked: "From Beyoncé ... to Britney Spears to Robyn to Sleigh Bells, the influence of Jackson's game-changer of a record is still rippling through the radio waves (or SoundCloud waves) today."

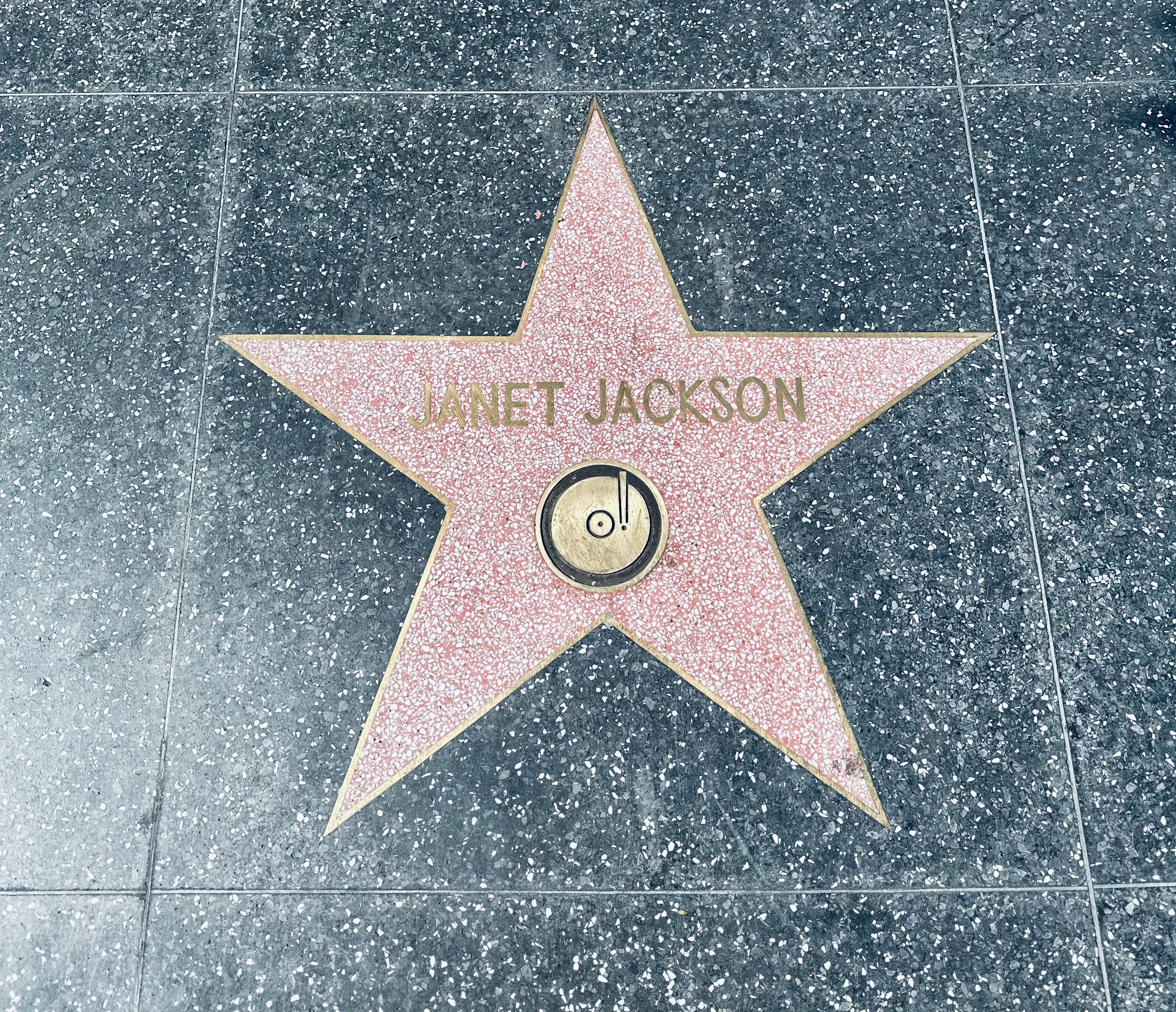
Janet Jackson's star on the Hollywood Walk of Fame

Jackson's handwritten lyrics to "Rhythm Nation" have been preserved by the Rock and Roll Hall of Fame's "Women Who Rock" exhibit, which Kathryn Metz describes as "the perfect platform to talk about song structure" for the museum's "Women Who Rock: Songwriting and Point of View" course, in which students analyze music written by female songwriters. The Hall has also preserved her military styled "Rhythm Nation" uniform. Rolling Stone observed the song's music video "set the template for hundreds of videos to come in the Nineties and aughts." Mike Weaver remarked the "innovative, one-of-a-kind, funk-and-groove choreography was unlike anything seen in the history of pop music." Although music historian Ted Gioia considered the song to be an "awkward chant" he commented that "Rhythm Nation" became "one of the most riveting videos of the era, a kind of sensual steampunk for MTV viewers." In 1990, Jackson received MTV's Video Vanguard Award for her contributions to the art form. That same year, she received a star on the Hollywood Walk of Fame in recognition of her impact on the recording industry and philanthropic endeavors, including her Rhythm Nation Scholarship fund. With her contractual obligations to A&M fulfilled in 1991, she signed with Virgin Records for an unprecedented multimillion-dollar deal, becoming the world's highest paid musician at the time.

Music scholars John Shepherd and David Horn wrote that as a crossover artist on the pop and R&B charts, she emerged "the most dominant female performer of the 1980s" behind Whitney Houston. Dan Rubey observed that she presented herself as a role model for black women and as a creative intellect whose work advocated the advancement of black people. Joseph Vogel stated that her rising popularity toward the end of the decade was important for several reasons, "not the least of which was how it coincided with (and spoke to) the rise of black feminism". At a time when radio airplay and MTV primarily catered to white rock musicians, her album and its predecessor garnered widespread critical acclaim alongside other "unprecedented breakthroughs" by black women—including Alice Walker's The Color Purple (1982), Toni Morrison's Beloved (1987) and Patricia Hill Collins's Black Feminist Thought (1990)—musically capturing the spirit of the movement and presenting an alternate model on both womanhood and feminism to that of Madonna. Regarding her diverse appeal among youth, he also stated: "Janet didn't have the vocal prowess of Whitney Houston, or the poetic subtlety of Kate Bush; she didn't have Annie Lennox's penchant for the avant-garde or Madonna's predilection for shock. But none of these artists achieved the cross-racial impact (particularly on youth culture) of Janet. And none of them had an album like Rhythm Nation 1814."

'I had this great epiphany
And Rhythm Nation was the dream
I guess next time, I'll know better'

— "Shoulda Known Better", Unbreakable

Jackson herself would comment on the album's legacy on her 2015 album Unbreakable. In the song "Shoulda Known Better", she reflects on her optimistic wish that Rhythm Nation 1814 could have profoundly changed the world, noting that there are many, deeper issues to fix and that broad strokes aren't enough. The chorus includes the line, "Cause I don't want my face to be / That poster child for being naive"; and Rhythm Nation's title is referred to as "an epiphany", with Jackson mentioning that "next time, I'll know better". Album co-producer Jimmy Jam told the BBC: "When you're young, you feel like: 'I can change the world! I'm going to lead the revolution!' And then you look 25 years later and you go: 'OK, I should have known better. The same problems still exist but there's a different way to go about tackling it. It still involves mobilising people, but I can't do it by myself.' It's just a wiser, more mature look at the reality of trying to make a positive change, a social change." In 2021, the Library of Congress announced it had selected Janet Jackson's Rhythm Nation 1814 for preservation and inducted it into the National Recording Registry. The album is one of 25 recordings inducted into the registry's class of 2020 that are considered to be "audio treasures worthy of preservation for all time based on their cultural, historical or aesthetic importance in the nation's recorded sound heritage." In May 2026, the album was one of fourteen recordings inducted in that year's class of the Grammy Hall of Fame.

== Track listing ==
All tracks are written by and produced by Janet Jackson, James Harris III, and Terry Lewis, except where noted.

No.	Title	Writer(s)	Producer(s)	Length
1.	"Interlude: Pledge"			0:47
2.	"Rhythm Nation"			5:31
3.	"Interlude: T.V."	Harris; Lewis		0:22
4.	"State of the World"			4:48
5.	"Interlude: Race"	Harris; Lewis		0:05
6.	"The Knowledge"	Harris; Lewis		3:54
7.	"Interlude: Let's Dance"	Harris; Lewis		0:03
8.	"Miss You Much"	Harris; Lewis		4:12
9.	"Interlude: Come Back"	Harris; Lewis		0:21
10.	"Love Will Never Do (Without You)"	Harris; Lewis		5:50
11.	"Livin' in a World (They Didn't Make)"	Harris; Lewis		4:41
12.	"Alright"			6:26
13.	"Interlude: Hey Baby"	Harris; Lewis		0:10
14.	"Escapade"			4:44
15.	"Interlude: No Acid"	Harris; Lewis		0:05
16.	"Black Cat"	Jackson	Jackson; Jellybean Johnson	4:50
17.	"Lonely"			4:59
18.	"Come Back to Me"			5:33
19.	"Someday Is Tonight"			6:00
20.	"Interlude: Livin'...In Complete Darkness"	Harris; Lewis		1:07
Total length:				64:34

=== Original vinyl release ===
Side one
No.	Title	Writer(s)	Producer(s)	Length
1.	"Interlude: Pledge"			0:47
2.	"Rhythm Nation"			4:38
3.	"State of the World"			4:53
4.	"The Knowledge"	Harris; Lewis		4:01
5.	"Miss You Much"	Harris; Lewis		3:53
6.	"Love Will Never Do (Without You)"	Harris; Lewis		5:48
7.	"Livin' in a World (They Didn't Make)"	Harris; Lewis		4:36

Side two
No.	Title	Writer(s)	Producer(s)	Length
1.	"Alright"			5:27
2.	"Escapade"			4:48
3.	"Black Cat"	Jackson	Jackson; Johnson	4:50
4.	"Lonely"			4:59
5.	"Come Back to Me"			5:32
6.	"Someday Is Tonight"			6:01
7.	"Interlude: Livin'...In Complete Darkness"	Harris; Lewis		1:06
Total length:				61:19

UK cassette two
No.	Title	Length
1.	"Miss You Much" (Shep's house mix)
2.	"You Need Me" (B-side to "Miss You Much")
3.	"Skin Game" (B-side to "Come Back to Me")
4.	"The 1814 Megamix" (full version)
5.	"Come Back to Me" (instrumental)

The Rhythm Nation Compilation video
No.	Title	Director(s)	Length
1.	"Prologue"	Dominic Sena	3:16
2.	"Miss You Much"	Sena	5:27
3.	"Rhythm Nation"	Sena	4:53
4.	"Escapade"	Peter Smillie	5:04
5.	"Alright" (extended version)	Julien Temple	9:05
6.	"Come Back to Me"	Sena	5:43
7.	"Black Cat"	Wayne Isham	5:23
8.	"Love Will Never Do (Without You)"	Herb Ritts	5:38
9.	"Epilogue"	Jonathan Dayton and Valerie Faris	1:42

Notes

- The original vinyl release does not list the interludes as separate tracks, they are instead located at the beginning of the next track.

== Personnel ==
- Janet Jackson – lead vocals, keyboards, background vocals, producer, arranger
- Herb Alpert – trumpet, horn, brass
- Julie Ayer – violin
- Stephen Barnett – conductor
- Steve Barnett – conductor
- David Barry – electric and 12-string guitar
- Lee Blaske – arranger
- Chris Brown – bass
- Carolyn Daws – violin
- Hanley Daws – violin
- David Eiland – programming
- Rene Elizondo – background vocals
- Richard Frankel – art direction, cover design
- Brian Gardner – mastering at Bernie Grundman Mastering, Hollywood, CA
- Johnny Gill – percussion, special effects, finger snaps
- James Greer – background vocals
- Guzman (Constance Hansen & Russell Peacock) – photography
- Steve Hodge – background vocals, engineer, mixing at Flyte Tyme Studio D, Edina, Minnesota
- Peter Howard – cello
- Jimmy Jam – percussion, piano, drums, keyboards, programming, producer
- Jellybean Johnson – guitar, drums, vocals, background vocals, producer
- Jesse Johnson – guitar
- Lisa Keith – background vocals
- Kathy Kienzle – harp
- Joshua Koestenbaum – cello
- Jamila Lafleur – background vocals
- Terry Lewis – bass, percussion, arranger, background vocals, producer
- Tshaye Marks – background vocals
- John McClain – background vocals, executive producer
- Tamika McDaniel – vocals
- Tarnika McDaniel – background vocals
- John McLain – guitar, background vocals
- Shante Owens – background vocals
- Amy Powell – vocals
- Randy Ran – background vocals
- Nicholas Raths – guitar, classical guitar
- Sonya Robinson – background vocals
- Clarice Rupert – background vocals
- Warlesha Ryan – background vocals
- Tamas Strasser – viola
- John Tartaglia – viola
- Reshard Taylor – background vocals
- Romuald Tecco – concert master
- Anthony Thomas – background vocals
- Hyacinthe Tlucek – concert master
- Steve Wilson – background vocals

== Charts ==
=== Weekly charts ===
Chart (1989–91)	Peak position
Australian Albums (ARIA)	1
Canada Top Albums/CDs (RPM)	5
Canadian Albums (The Record)	7
Dutch Albums (Album Top 100)	28
European Albums (Top 100)	23
Finnish Albums (Suomen virallinen albumilista)	16
German Albums (Offizielle Top 100)	39
Japanese Albums (Oricon)	8
New Zealand Albums (RMNZ)	9
Swedish Albums (Sverigetopplistan)	24
Swiss Albums (Schweizer Hitparade)	23
UK Albums (Official Charts)	4
US Billboard 200	1
US Top R&B/Hip-Hop Albums (Billboard)	1
Chart (2019)	Peak position
UK R&B Albums (Official Charts)	12
UK Vinyl Albums (Official Charts)	30
Chart (2022)	Peak position
UK Album Downloads (Official Charts)ERROR in "UKDigital": Invalid date format. Expected: YYYYMMDD or YYYY-MM-DD.	89

=== Year-end charts ===
Chart (1989)	Position
Canada Top Albums/CDs (RPM)	53
US Billboard 200	49

Chart (1990)	Position
Australian Albums (ARIA)	90
Canada Top Albums/CDs (RPM)	25
Japanese Albums (Oricon)	61
New Zealand Albums (RMNZ)	25
UK Albums (MRIB)	38
US Billboard 200	1
US Top R&B/Hip-Hop Albums (Billboard)	1

Chart (1991)	Position
Australian Albums (ARIA)	13
US Billboard 200	43
US Top R&B/Hip-Hop Albums (Billboard)	77

=== All-time chart ===
Chart	Position
US Billboard 200	94

== Certifications and sales ==
Region	Certification	Certified units/sales
Australia (ARIA)	2× Platinum	140,000^{^}
Canada (Music Canada)	Platinum	100,000^{^}
Hong Kong (IFPI Hong Kong)	Gold	10,000^{*}
Japan (RIAJ)	Gold	500,000
Netherlands (NVPI)	Gold	50,000^{^}
New Zealand (RMNZ)	Gold	7,500^{^}
Switzerland (IFPI Switzerland)	Gold	25,000^{^}
Taiwan (RIT)	Platinum	150,000
United Kingdom (BPI)	Platinum	300,000^{^}
United States (RIAA)	6× Platinum	7,000,000
Summaries
Worldwide	—	12,000,000
^{*} Sales figures based on certification alone.^{^} Shipments figures based on certification alone.

Certifications for The Rhythm Nation Compilation (video)
Region	Certification	Certified units/sales
United States (RIAA)	Platinum	100,000^{^}
^{^} Shipments figures based on certification alone.

== Release history ==
Region	Date	Edition(s)	Format(s)	Label(s)	Ref.
United Kingdom	September 18, 1989	Standard	CD; LP; Cassette	A&M; Polydor	
United Kingdom	September 18, 1989	Limited	Picture CD	A&M; Polydor	
United States	September 19, 1989	Standard	CD; LP; Cassette	A&M; Polydor	
United States	September 19, 1989	Limited	Box set	A&M; Polydor	
Japan	September 21, 1989	Standard	CD; LP; Cassette	A&M; Pony Canyon	
United Kingdom	September 17, 1990	Limited	CD/Cassette; Picture disc	A&M; Polydor	
Various	October 17, 2015	Standard	Digital download; streaming	A&M	
Various	July 26, 2019	Standard	Silver LP	A&M; UM^{e}; JDJ	

== See also ==
- List of best-selling albums by women
- 1001 Albums You Must Hear Before You Die
- The 500 Greatest Albums of All Time
