= Escapade (song) =

1990 single by Janet Jackson

Single by Janet Jackson

from the album Janet Jackson's Rhythm Nation 1814
- Released: January 8, 1990
- Recorded: 1988–1989
- Studio: Flyte Tyme (Minneapolis, Minnesota)
- Genre: Dance-pop; new jack swing
- Length: 4:44
- Label: A&M
- Songwriters: Janet Jackson; James Harris III; Terry Lewis
- Producers: Jimmy Jam and Terry Lewis; Janet Jackson

Janet Jackson singles chronology
"Rhythm Nation" (1989)	"Escapade" (1990)	"Alright" (1990)

Music video
- "Escapade" on YouTube

"Escapade" is a song by American singer Janet Jackson from her fourth studio album, Janet Jackson's Rhythm Nation 1814 (1989). It was written and produced by Jackson and Jimmy Jam and Terry Lewis. The song was released on January 8, 1990, by A&M Records as the third single (fourth in the United Kingdom) from Janet Jackson's Rhythm Nation 1814 (1989). "Escapade" was one of the historic seven top-five singles released from the Rhythm Nation 1814 album and reached number one on the US Billboard Hot 100.

The accompanying music video for "Escapade" takes place at an exotic carnival setting, also featuring Jackson's trademark intense choreography. The song and its video have influenced other songs and videos from several artists, who have cited influence from its upbeat tempo and joyous feel. "Escapade" won a BMI Pop Award for Most Played Song due to its frequent airplay and popularity among the general public, and was also performed by Jackson in her Japanese commercials for Japan Airlines. It has been included in each of Jackson's greatest hits albums, Design of a Decade: 1986–1996 (1995), Number Ones (2009) and Icon: Number Ones (2010).

== Background and recording ==
"Escapade" is an upbeat song written and produced by Jackson and Jimmy Jam and Terry Lewis for Jackson's fourth album Janet Jackson's Rhythm Nation 1814, and served as the follow-up to Jackson's prior single "Rhythm Nation". Jackson, Jam and Lewis came up with the song's theme after hearing the word used in a conversation, deciding it would make an interesting song title due to the word being uncommon. "We usually come up with the music first, then we try to think of a title that fits the way the music sounds", Jam said. "And 'Escapade' we thought was a cool word. It is kind of old fashioned — people don't really say 'Let's go on an escapade' anymore, but it really worked with that track."

The song was partially inspired by Martha & the Vandellas's 1965 song "Nowhere to Run", which Jackson originally considered covering for the album, but instead chose to record a new song after a suggestion from producer Jimmy Jam. After the proposal, Jackson and her producers developed the song's initial idea, which was based on having an anthem-like feel, and "Escapade" became one of the first songs to be recorded for the album. Jam also described the song's production and recording process, saying "While she was sitting in one room coming up with the lyrics, I put it on the 24-track. We hooked the drum machine up. On my left hand I played the bass, on the right hand I played the chord. And it was just enough for her to sing to, which we do a lot. Because we like to let her sing to as minimum of a track as we can do, then fill in the track around her so that her part is the main part of the song. With 'Escapade,' she sang it and we kept saying we'll go back and redo the track...we never redid the track. There's a keyboard bass and another thing, and that was it. All we added were the overdubs, little bells ... because we'd gotten so used to the feel of the track, the mistakes and all, we ended up leaving it the way it was."

== Composition ==
"Escapade" is set in common time with a key of A♭ major. Jackson's voice ranges A♭_{3} to E♭_{5}. The song is in a medium dance groove tempo of 115 beats per minute with the chord progression being set like Db–Eb–Fmin.

== Commercial performance ==
"Escapade" peaked at number one on the US Billboard Hot 100 for three weeks in early March 1990, becoming Jackson's third number-one single. It also topped the Hot R&B/Hip-Hop Songs and Dance Club Songs charts, and was certified Gold by the Recording Industry Association of America. "Escapade" was notably her sixth consecutive number-one single on the Hot R&B/Hip-Hop Songs chart, tying a record previously held by Louis Jordan over forty years prior. The single also reached number one in Canada and Japan, as well as the Top 15 of Belgium, the Netherlands, Ireland, and New Zealand, as well as the Top 20 on the United Kingdom singles chart and in Germany, also reaching the Top 25 in Australia and France. However, the song did not have a physical single released in many territories, which affected its chart positions despite strong airplay. Jackson's popularity on music channels such as MTV worldwide also secured her high album sales, with her Rhythm Nation 1814 album more than doubling its domestic sales internationally.

== Music video ==
The music video for the song was directed by Peter Smillie and was filmed in the backlot of Universal Studios Hollywood. Set in a Mardi Gras-like carnival. Jackson and her dancers perform choreography in the exotic environment, with several subsequent pop videos using similar themes drawing influence from the clip. It was choreographed by Jackson and Anthony Thomas.

An alternate video for the song, filmed at Los Angeles International Airport, was used as a commercial for Japan Airlines. It shows Jackson and her dancers performing to a backdrop of the then-new Japan Airlines 747-400's, taxiing, taking off, and landing on the runways of LAX.

== Live performances ==
Jackson has performed "Escapade" on all of her tours, including the Rhythm Nation 1814 Tour, janet. Tour, The Velvet Rope Tour, All for You Tour, Rock Witchu Tour, Number Ones: Up Close and Personal, Unbreakable World Tour, and on the first leg of the State of the World Tour. Jackson included the song on her 2019 Las Vegas residency Janet Jackson: Metamorphosis. It was also included on her special concert series Janet Jackson: A Special 30th Anniversary Celebration of Rhythm Nation in 2019.

== Legacy ==
Several artists have been influenced by the upbeat tempo and joyous feel of "Escapade". Britney Spears said she was inspired by the song and Jackson's Rhythm Nation 1814 album for her eighth studio album Britney Jean, explaining "I wanted to kind of recreate some of Janet's greatest moments that she's had, "Escapade" and that whole era. That's what I wanted to do, just have a lot of uptempos that were just high energy and a lot of fun."

The song appears in the video game ‘’Dance Central 2’’ as downloadable content.

== Track listing and formats ==
International 7-inch single, Japanese mini-CD and cassette single

1. "Escapade" (LP version)
2. "Escapade" (instrumental)

International 12-inch single

1. "Escapade" (Shep's Good Time mix) – 7:16
2. "Escapade" (The Get Away dub) – 5:21
3. "Escapade" (LP version) – 4:45
4. "Escapade" (Shep's Housecapade mix) – 7:54
5. "Escapade" (Housecapade dub) – 5:42
6. "Escapade" (I Can't Take No More dub) – 4:58

UK and West German 12-inch single, West German CD single

1. "Escapade" (Hippiapolis mix)
2. "Escapade" (Hippiapolis In dub)
3. "Escapade" (One Nation Under a Rhythm mix)

West German CD maxi

1. "Escapade" (LP version)
2. "Escapade" (Shep's Good Times Mix)
3. "Escapade" (Shep's Housecapade Mix)

UK CD maxi

1. "Escapade" (We Got It Made 7-inch)
2. "Escapade" (Shep's Housecapade mix)
3. "Escapade" (Shep's Housecapade dub)

UK 7-inch and cassette single

1. "Escapade" (We Got It Made 7-inch)
2. "Escapade" (Housecapade 7-inch)

Japanese maxi CD single

1. "Escapade" (The Get Away 7-inch)
2. "Escapade" (We Got It Made 7-inch)
3. "Escapade" (The Good Time 7-inch)
4. "Escapade" (Housecapade 7-inch)
5. "Escapade" (Shep's Good Times mix)
6. "Escapade" (Shep's Housecapade mix)
7. "Escapade" (The Get Away dub)
8. "Escapade" (Housecapade dub)
9. "Escapade" (I Can't Take No More dub)
10. "Escapade" (LP version)

== Charts ==
=== Weekly charts ===
Chart (1990)	Peak position
Australia (ARIA)	25
Belgium (Ultratop 50 Flanders)	11
Canada Top Singles (RPM)	1
Canada Adult Contemporary (RPM)	9
Canada Dance/Urban (RPM)	1
Canada Retail Singles (The Record)	3
Canada Contemporary Hit Radio (The Record)	1
Europe (European Hot 100 Singles)	29
France (SNEP)	23
Iceland (Íslenski Listinn Topp 10)	3
Ireland (IRMA)	13
Luxembourg (Radio Luxembourg)	13
Netherlands (Dutch Top 40)	13
Netherlands (Single Top 100)	17
New Zealand (Recorded Music NZ)	15
UK Singles (Official Charts)	17
US Billboard Hot 100	1
US Adult Contemporary (Billboard)	16
US Dance Club Songs (Billboard)	1
US Dance Singles Sales (Billboard)	2
US Hot R&B/Hip-Hop Songs (Billboard)	1
US Cash Box Top 100	1
US Adult Contemporary (Radio & Records)	11
US Contemporary Hit Radio (Radio & Records)	1
US Urban (Radio & Records)	2
West Germany (GfK)	17

=== Year-end charts ===
Chart (1990)	Position
Australia (ARIA)	100
Canada Top Singles (RPM)	10
Canada Adult Contemporary (RPM)	85
Canada Dance/Urban (RPM)	13
US Billboard Hot 100	15
US 12-inch Singles Sales (Billboard)	27
US Dance Club Play (Billboard)	13
US Hot R&B Songs (Billboard)	54
US Cash Box Top 100	8
US Contemporary Hit Radio (Radio & Records)	2
US Urban (Radio & Records)	42

== Certifications ==
Region	Certification	Certified units/sales
United States (RIAA)	Platinum	1,000,000^{‡}
^{‡} Sales+streaming figures based on certification alone.

== Release history ==
Region	Date	Format(s)	Label(s)	Ref.
United States	January 8, 1990	7-inch vinyl; 12-inch vinyl; cassette	A&M	
Australia	March 5, 1990	7-inch vinyl; cassette	A&M; Polydor	
United Kingdom	March 19, 1990	7-inch vinyl; 12-inch vinyl; CD; cassette	A&M; Breakout	
United Kingdom	March 26, 1990	12-inch vinyl with print art	A&M; Breakout	
United Kingdom	April 2, 1990	12-inch vinyl (Remixes)	A&M; Breakout	
Japan	May 21, 1990	CD (Remixes)	A&M	

== See also ==
- List of number-one dance singles of 1990 (U.S.)
- List of Billboard Hot 100 number-one singles of 1990
- List of number-one R&B singles of 1990 (U.S.)
