= State of the World (song) =

1991 single by Janet Jackson

- Australian commercial CD/vinyl single

Single by Janet Jackson

from the album Janet Jackson's Rhythm Nation 1814
- Released: February 6, 1991
- Studio: Flyte Tyme (Minneapolis, Minnesota)
- Genre: New jack swing
- Length: 4:47
- Label: A&M
- Songwriters: Janet Jackson; James Harris III; Terry Lewis
- Producers: Jimmy Jam and Terry Lewis

Janet Jackson singles chronology
"Love Will Never Do (Without You)" (1990)	"State of the World" (1991)	"The Best Things in Life Are Free" (1992)

"State of the World" is a song recorded by American singer Janet Jackson for her fourth studio album, Janet Jackson's Rhythm Nation 1814 (1989). It was written and produced by Jimmy Jam and Terry Lewis, with additional writing by Jackson. While recording the album, Jackson and the producers watched television, especially news channels, and created the song inspired by that. "State of the World" focuses lyrically on homeless people. It was released as the eighth and final single from the album on February 6, 1991, by A&M Records.

The song was not released commercially in the United States, making it ineligible to chart on the Billboard Hot 100 or the Hot R&B/Hip-Hop Songs, but it reached number five on the Billboard Hot 100 Airplay chart and number eight on the Cash Box Top 100. No music video was made to accompany the song.

== Background and release ==
Following the commercial and critical success of her 1986 album, Control, Jackson was motivated to continue songwriting and took a larger role in the creative production of her new album. Executives at A&M requested that she expand on the ideas presented on Control, suggesting a concept album entitled Scandal that would have been about the Jackson family. She wrote a song titled "You Need Me" which was directed at her father Joseph, but was unwilling to devote an entire album to the subject and substituted her own concept for theirs. She commented that "[a] lot of people wanted me to do another album like Control and that's what I didn't want to do. I wanted to do something that I really believed in and that I really felt strong about." The concept of Rhythm Nation emerged as Jackson was a TV watcher, "We would watch BET, MTV ... then switched over to CNN, and there'd always be something messed-up happening. It was never good news, always bad news", producer James "Jimmy Jam" Harris recalled. "State of the World" was one of these songs, influenced by TV and news. Jam recalled that with the song, they were trying to do something like Marvin Gaye's song "What's Going On" although we never could hope to achieve that, but still wanted to make people aware of what was happening in a way they could dance to it. Released on February 6, 1991, "State of the World" was the eighth and the final single of Janet Jackson's Rhythm Nation 1814. The record label reckoned that they would boost album sales with a radio-only promotion.

== Composition ==
On the album, "State of the World" is preceded by "T.V.", a 22-second interlude which features the sound of a viewer switching cable channels and hearing such phrases as "the homeless problem", "good looks", "Tiananmen Square", "tempting", "violent crimes are on the rise", and "so frustrating". The track focuses lyrically on homeless people, with such lines as "Drugs and crime spreadin' on the streets/ People can't find enough to eat/ Now our kids can't go out and play/ That's the state of the world today". According to Jon Pareles of The New York Times, Jackson tries to stay optimistic with the world's state: "Let's weather the storm together", and compared the song musically to the music by Prince. In the book Born in the U.S.A.: The Myth of America in Popular Music from Colonial Times to the Present by Timothy E. Scheurer, the author noted that she "attempts to deliver a message of hope". According to him, the song is like a "medical diagnosis in which Jackson proposes education as the key to settling problems". Pace magazine described the song as an "aggressive dance assault". Eric Henderson from Slant Magazine noted that the producers "loosened their rigid backbeats in acquiescence with new jack's standard three-on-one swing" as noted in the song.

== Critical reception ==
Jon Pareles of The New York Times considered that "despite its platitudinous message, [the song] has stark edges and angles". Sputnikmusic's Zachary Powell commented that "'State of the World' keeps the upbeat motion that Rhythm Nation begins, but with more of a socially conscious twist. It shares with the preceding track a groovy beat and danceability, but takes it to another direction lyrically and shows the caring side of Janet Jackson". Dennis Hunt of Los Angeles Times commented positively saying that the move to social commentary was a rocky decision. However, he felt that "State of the World" was not interesting enough musically to carry the messages.

In the book Michael Jackson: A Life in Music, by writer Geoff Brown focusing on Jackson's brother Michael, he noted that like her brother, she can focus on problems as shown on the song, but she offers no solutions to them. The New Rolling Stone Album Guide commented that "heartfelt pleas for racial unity and cloudy musings on the 'State of the World' don't obscure the pulsating beat of other songs" from the album. Jonathan Van Meter from Spin was critical of the song, saying that "State of the World", "Rhythm Nation" and "The Knowledge" formed "a Spike Lee-esque trilogy made even less convincing by a tiresome house music back-beat and that unfortunate, outdated beat on every fourth count". AllMusic's editor Alex Henderson called the song "disturbing".

== Chart performance and live performance ==
In the US the song was released as a radio-only single, and was therefore ineligible to chart on the Billboard Hot 100 and Hot R&B/Hip-Hop Songs. However, it peaked at number five on the US Billboard Hot 100 Airplay and number nine on the Hot Dance Club Songs charts. Author Fred Bronson noted it likely would have been the album's eighth top ten hit if a commercial product had been distributed. In Australia, the song received a commercial release in June 1991, and peaked at number 94 on the ARIA Singles Chart in July 1991. Jackson has performed the song on two of her tours, the Rhythm Nation World Tour and on her State of the World Tour in 2017, with it being the last number of the show in its 2018 leg. Jackson also included the song on her 2019 Las Vegas residency Janet Jackson: Metamorphosis.

== Track listings ==
Australian CD single
No.	Title	Length
1.	"State of the World" (LP version)	4:49
2.	"State of the World" (State of the World Suite)	14:09

Australasian CD single
No.	Title	Length
1.	"State of the World" (LP version)	4:49
2.	"State of the World" (State of the House 7-inch)	4:32

Japanese CD maxi-single (The Remixes)
No.	Title	Length
1.	"State of the World" (United Nations 7-inch)	4:20
2.	"State of the World" (State of the House 7-inch)	4:32
3.	"State of the World" (Third World 7-inch)	4:26
4.	"State of the World" (LP version)	4:49
5.	"State of the World" (State of the House 12-inch)	4:59
6.	"State of the World" (United Nations 12-inch)	7:50
7.	"State of the World" (United Nations dub)	6:15
8.	"State of the World" (United Nations instrumental)	4:49
9.	"State of the World" (Third World dub)	3:08
10.	"State of the World" (Third World instrumental)	4:47
11.	"State of the World" (Make a Change dub)	4:45
12.	"State of the World" (World Dance mix)	4:52
13.	"State of the World" (State of the World Suite)	14:09

== Credits and personnel ==
Credits are adapted from Janet Jackson's Rhythm Nation 1814 album booklet.

Locations

- Recorded and mixed at the Flyte Tyme Studios (Minneapolis, Minnesota)

Personnel

- Janet Jackson – lead vocals, background vocals, songwriter, co-producer, keyboards, rhythm and vocal arranger
- Jimmy Jam – producer, songwriter, keyboards and drum programming, percussion, rhythm and vocal arranger
- Terry Lewis – producer, songwriter, percussion, background vocals, rhythm and vocal arranger
- René Elizondo Jr. – background vocals
- Steve Hodge – background vocals, recording and mixing engineer
- Brian Gardner – mastering

== Charts ==
=== Weekly charts ===
Weekly chart performance for "State of the World"
Chart (1991)	Peak position
Australia (ARIA)	94
Canada Top Singles (RPM)	14
Canada Contemporary Hit Radio (The Record)	11
US Radio Songs (Billboard)	5
US Dance Club Songs (Billboard)	9
US Cash Box Top 100	8
US Contemporary Hit Radio (Radio & Records)	4
US Urban Contemporary (Radio & Records)	26

=== Year-end charts ===
Year-end chart performance for "State of the World"
Chart (1991)	Position
US Contemporary Hit Radio (Radio & Records)	54

== Release history ==
Release dates and formats for "State of the World"
Region	Date	Format(s)	Label(s)	Ref.
United States	February 6, 1991	Radio	A&M	
Japan	April 21, 1991	Maxi-CD	A&M	
Australia	June 10, 1991	7-inch vinyl; CD; cassette	A&M	

== Bibliography ==
- Brackett, Nathan; Hoard, Christian David (2004), The New Rolling Stone Album Guide, Simon and Schuster, ISBN 0-7432-0169-8
- Bronson, Fred (2002), Billboard's Hottest Hot 100 Hits, Watson-Guptill, ISBN 978-0-8230-7738-0
- Bronson, Fred (2003), The Billboard Book of Number 1 Hits, Billboard Books, ISBN 0-8230-7677-6
- Brown, Geoff (2010), Michael Jackson A Life In Music: A Life in Music, Omnibus Press, ISBN 978-0-85712-257-5
- Scheurer, Timothy E. (2007), Born in the U.S.A.: The Myth of America in Popular Music from Colonial Times to the Present, University Press of Mississippi, ISBN 978-1-934110-56-0
- Strong, Martin (2004), The Great Rock Discography: Complete Discographies Listing Every Track, Canongate U.S., ISBN 1-84195-615-5
