= Janet: Live in Hawaii =

Video by Janet Jackson
- Released: June 17, 2002 (United Kingdom); July 28, 2002 (Australia); September 3, 2002 (United States)
- Recorded: February 16, 2002
- Venue: Aloha Stadium (Halawa, Hawaii)
- Genre: R&B; pop
- Length: 115 min
- Language: English
- Label: Eagle Rock Entertainment
- Director: David Mallet

Janet Jackson chronology
All for You (DVD edition) (2001)	Janet: Live in Hawaii (2002)	From Janet to Damita Jo: The Videos (2004)

Janet: Live in Hawaii is a video released by American R&B/pop singer Janet Jackson.

== Release information ==
Recorded on February 16, 2002, the final date of the All for You Tour at the Aloha Stadium in Hawaii, it was televised live on February 17, 2002, on HBO, and was Jackson's second concert appearance with the cable channel. The program attracted approximately 12 million viewers.

During the performance of "Would You Mind?", Jackson picks an unsuspecting member of the audience onto stage and teases them with her performance, as seen in the full-length bonus feature. Missy Elliott makes a guest performance for "Son of a Gun". The video also contains behind the scenes look at Jackson backstage during the long breaks between songs.

The video was released on June 17, 2002, in the UK and September 3, 2002, in the U.S., and was nominated for an Emmy Award in 2002 for Outstanding Multi-Camera Picture Editing for a Miniseries, Movie or a Special. It was released on July 28, 2002, in Australia where it debuted in the number two place before moving to number one the same week.

It was repackaged with The Velvet Rope Tour – Live in Concert video and re-released as a double disc set in the US and Europe on November 14, 2004, and again in Europe with a different cover in 2005.

== Track listing ==
Live in Hawaii
No.	Title	Length
1.	"Introduction"
2.	"Come On Get Up"
3.	"You Ain't Right"
4.	"All for You"
5.	"Love Will Never Do (Without You)"
6.	"Trust a Try"
7.	"Come Back to Me"
8.	"Let's Wait Awhile"
9.	"Again"
10.	"Runaway"/"Miss You Much"/"When I Think of You"/"Escapade" (Escapade medley)
11.	"Son of a Gun (I Betcha Think This Song Is About You)" (with Missy Elliott)
12.	"Got 'til It's Gone"
13.	"That's the Way Love Goes"
14.	"What Have You Done for Me Lately"/"Control"/"Nasty" (Nasty medley)
15.	"Alright"
16.	"Would You Mind?"
17.	"If"
18.	"Black Cat"
19.	"Rhythm Nation"
20.	"Doesn't Really Matter"
21.	"Someone to Call My Lover"
22.	"Together Again"

Bonus Features
No.	Title	Length
23.	"Janet Speaks All for You"
24.	"Photo Gallery"
25.	"Would You Mind"

== Certifications ==
Region	Certification	Certified units/sales
Australia (ARIA)	Platinum	15,000^{^}
Canada (Music Canada)	Platinum	10,000^{^}
Japan	—	80,000
United States (RIAA)	Platinum	100,000^{^}
^{^} Shipments figures based on certification alone.

== Release history ==
Live in Hawaii

Region	Date	Label
Europe	June 24, 2002	Eagle Rock Entertainment
Australia	July 28, 2002	Warner Vision
United States	September 3, 2002	Warner Home Video
Europe	September 26, 2005	Warner Home Video

Live in Hawaii/The Velvet Rope Tour

Region	Date	Label
Europe	September 6, 2004	Eagle Rock Entertainment
United States	November 16, 2004	Eagle Rock Entertainment
