= From Janet to Damita Jo: The Videos =

From janet. to Damita Jo: The Videos

Video by Janet Jackson
- Released: September 6, 2004
- Recorded: 1993–2004
- Genre: Pop; dance-pop; R&B
- Length: 120 minutes
- Language: English
- Label: Virgin
- Director: Janet Jackson; Francis Lawrence; Dave Meyers; David Mallet; Dominic Sena; Jonathan Dayton and Valerie Faris; Beth McCarthy; Keir McFarlane; Mark Romanek; Matthew Rolston; Paul Hunter; René Elizondo Jr.; Seb Janiak

Janet Jackson chronology
Janet: Live in Hawaii (2002)	From janet. to Damita Jo: The Videos (2004)

From janet. to Damita Jo: The Videos is the third music video release by American singer Janet Jackson. It was released on September 6, 2004, by Virgin Records, following the debut of Jackson's eighth studio album, Damita Jo. The anthology contains music videos from her first four studio albums released on Virgin Records. It also includes several live performances, the filming of "All Nite (Don't Stop)", an exclusive album interview, and photo gallery.

The compilation received positive reviews from critics, who commended Jackson's visual evolution throughout her career. It was also thought to depict the huge influence she has become on younger artists, observed to emulate the "controversial pop superstar". Jackson's choreography and sexual allure were also subjects of recognition. Following her Super Bowl Halftime Show incident, inclusions from Jackson's Damita Jo album were blacklisted on music channels and radio stations owned by Viacom, CBS and Clear Channel Communications due to receiving fines from the U.S. Federal Communications Commission.

== Background ==
From janet. to Damita Jo: The Videos is Jackson's third video compilation, following Design of a Decade: 1986–1996 and the special edition of All for You. It includes her music videos released via the Virgin label, spanning from her fifth studio album janet. to her eighth album, Damita Jo. Following the Super Bowl performance incident, the singles from the latter album were blacklisted by music channels and radio stations owned by Viacom, Clear Channel Communications and CBS, including MTV and VH1. Several performances filmed at MuchMoreMusic and On Air with Ryan Seacrest are also included, along with the filming of "All Nite (Don't Stop)" and Damita Jo album interview. Its artwork was taken by British photographer Max Vadukul.

The videos on the release have collectively won numerous accolades, including MTV Video Music Awards, Grammy Awards for "Best Short Form Music Video" and MVPA Awards. The compilation is essentially a follow-up companion release to Design of a Decade with "That's the Way Love Goes" being the only video being included on both compilations. The release also omits some videos, including "Whoops Now" video, which is included on Design of a Decade, "Doesn't Really Matter", directed by Joseph Kahn. "Just a Little While"'s music video was replaced with a live performance filmed at London's Channel 4. The remix video of "Someone to Call My Lover" is included in place of the original. HMV Japan initially revealed its track listing to include an unreleased music video for "R&B Junkie", although it was not included on the final release.

== Critical reception ==
Professional ratings
Review scores
Source	Rating
AllMusic	4/5 stars
Belfast Telegraph	2/5 stars

"With dance routines so tight they are bound to cause domestic injury if tried at home, the funky, up tempo numbers more than punch their weight. The ballads, meanwhile, are slushy, totally unhurried and more than a little indulgent — again, a precedent her rivals are more than happy to go along with."

— MusicOMH.

The compilation received favorable reviews amongst critics, who applauded its display of Jackson's progression throughout her music videos and career. Her intense choreography and sexuality were also subjects of recognition. Rob Theakston of AllMusic praised Jackson's videography and appeal, saying, "Janet Jackson remains a marvel to observe as a hallmark of beauty within the pop world." In contrast to her contemporaries, Theakston added, "Janet somehow emotes a near flawless sexuality and does so almost effortlessly." The compilation was considered "a further reinforcement" of her consistent allure, noting "the visuals complement the music well". While the theme of several videos were likened to "late-night cable adult movie[s]", the release was recommended for both "die-hard fans" and "testosterone-fueled adolescent teens". Ben Hogwood of MusicOMH praised the compilation as "worth a look", commending Jackson's artistry and choreography to "more than punch their weight". Jackson's physical appearance and "seemingly ageless features" were also called "astounding", as Hogwood remarked, "When you think some ten years separate the first video from the last, if anything she looks younger now than she did then." However, Jackson's portrayal of sexuality within several videos was observed to be "curiously detached" from her visual persona, "even if we do get some fairly gratuitous shots of the fearsome flat stomach, not to mention some generous cleavage shots for Super Bowl fans."

Analyzing its chronology, "That's the Way Love Goes" was defined as "a sultry start with Janet up against a pillar", while the split-screen effect utilized in "Because of Love" was called "extremely effective". The "suggestive" theme of "Any Time, Any Place" notably displayed Jackson's "more salacious side", while "Got 'til It's Gone" was regarded to "stand out" amongst her videography, declared a "very dark canvas" with "a powerful impact" for its depiction of Apartheid. In contrast, "All for You" was observed as "much more on a girlie tip", with the premise of "spotting a guy she fancies on the metro and performing another elaborate dance routine with her "friends"." Its choreography was declared "superbly done, tight as anything, with Jackson totally comfortable and in control". The video for "You", consisting of footage from Jackson's The Velvet Rope Tour, was examined as "too severe", noting her "disembodied voice and some bondage-type gear". However, the darker approach of "Son of a Gun" was considered "a treat". The inclusions from Jackson's Damita Jo album were acknowledged to continue her fashion of "good videos". A bonus feature of Jackson reunited with a childhood friend was also called "sweet". MSN Entertainment praised the release from the "controversial pop superstar", tracing "the latest phase of her music career".

== Legacy ==
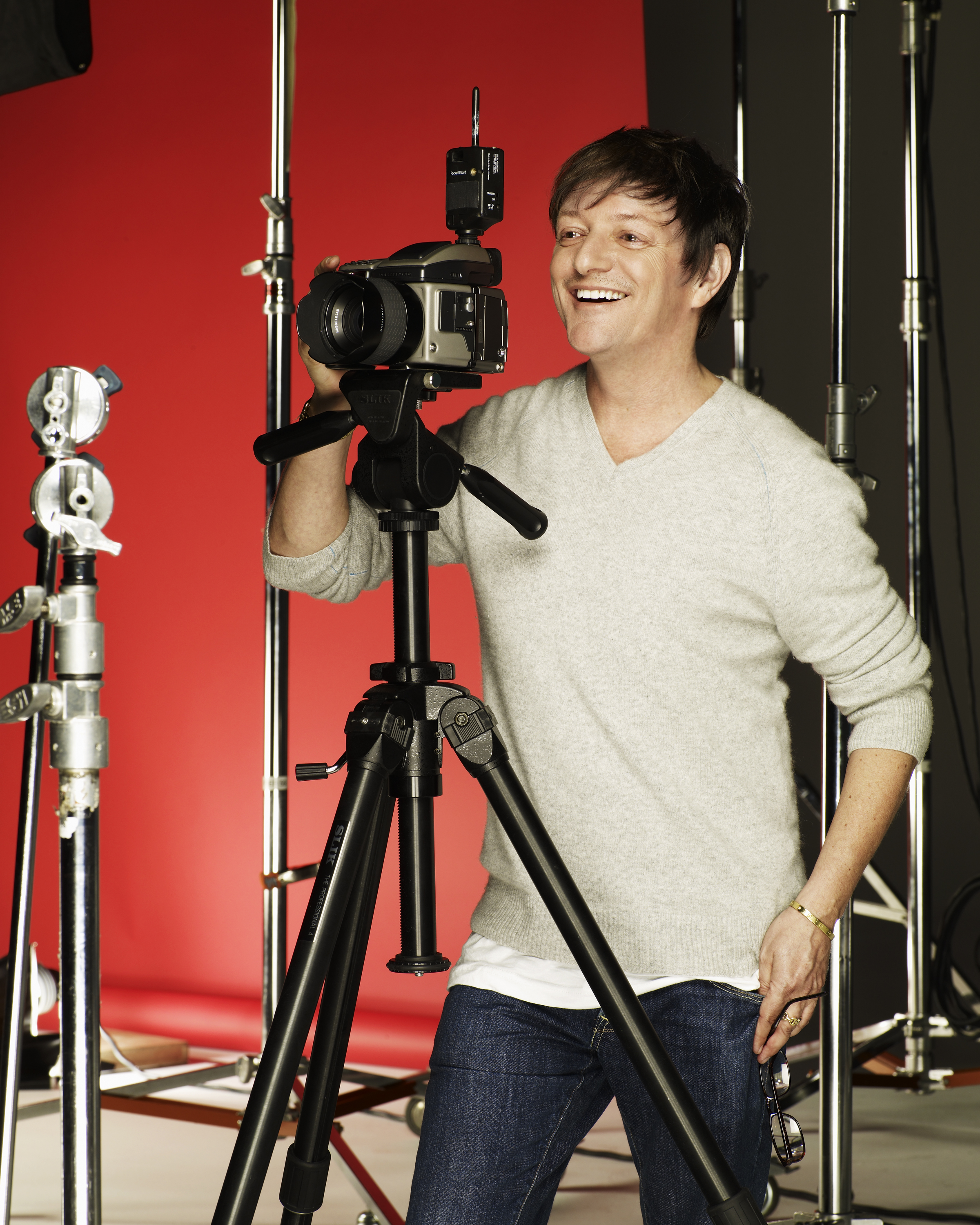
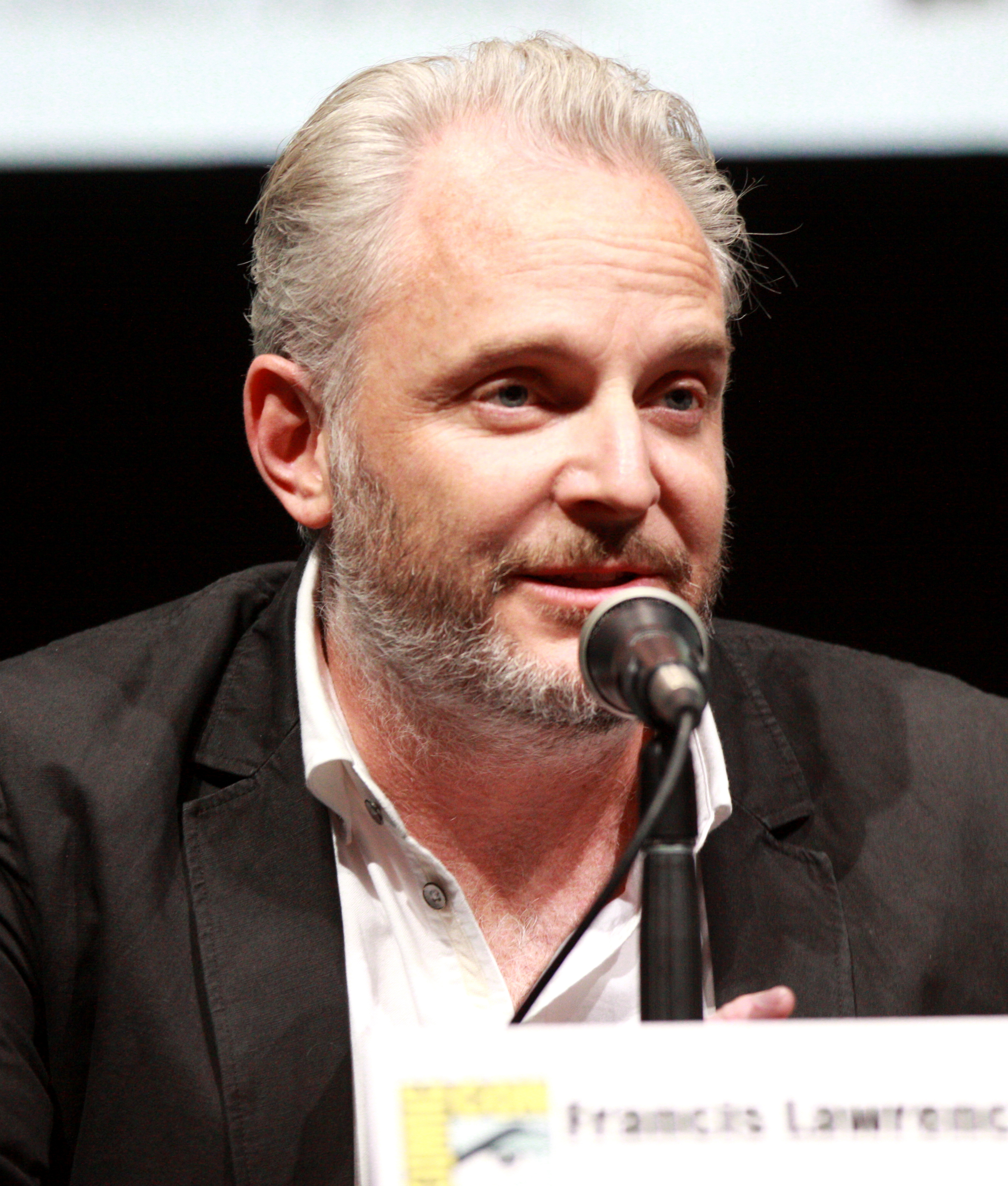
The compilation includes music videos directed by Matthew Rolston and Francis Lawrence.

Jackson's body of work presented in the compilation has been regarded as largely influential within popular music. Upon its release, several critics observed Jackson's work to not receive proper credit for its leverage, despite significance within pop culture and entertainment. Ben Hogwood of MusicOMH stated, "What is clear from this compilation is what a huge influence she has become on younger pretenders to her throne, most notably Britney Spears, Jennifer Lopez and Christina Aguilera." Hogwood added, "It goes without saying that it helps to be a fan of the music, but Jackson's influence can be clearly seen throughout — the one female singers still look up to." Ernest Hardy of LA Weekly regarded Jackson to surpass the influence of rival Madonna, calling her "the unheralded mother-architect, for better or worse, of the current pop world... While it's a conditioned reflex for mainstream critics to heap praise upon Madonna as the mold from which MTV's pop brigade is stamped, the truth is a bit more complicated."

PopMatters called her a "consummate product of popular culture", adding, "Janet Jackson's music videos don't confine or define her so much as they stretch possibilities, making the medium itself seem more flexible and optimistic than rigid." Vibe ranked Jackson among the music industry's "most valuable players", describing the release to span "Janet's amazing career". Jackson later stated, "I have seen different elements from all of these videos in lots of artists work and it's a great feeling to know that you have inspired them in such a way."

== Track listing ==
No.	Title	Director(s)	Length
1.	"That's the Way Love Goes"	René Elizondo Jr.	5:31
2.	"If"	Dominic Sena	5:25
3.	"Again"	Elizondo	3:55
4.	"Because of Love"	Beth McCarthy	4:22
5.	"Any Time, Any Place"	Keir McFarlane	4:48
6.	"You Want This"	McFarlane	5:28
7.	"Got 'til It's Gone" (featuring Q-Tip and Joni Mitchell)	Mark Romanek	4:22
8.	"Together Again"	Seb Janiak	4:28
9.	"I Get Lonely"	Paul Hunter	4:55
10.	"Go Deep"	Jonathan Dayton; Valerie Faris	4:45
11.	"You"	David Mallet	4:18
12.	"Every Time"	Matthew Rolston	4:31
13.	"Together Again" (Deeper Remix)	Elizondo	4:14
14.	"All for You"	Dave Meyers	4:47
15.	"Someone to Call My Lover" (So So Def remix; featuring Jermaine Dupri)	Francis Lawrence	4:37
16.	"Son of a Gun (I Betcha Think This Song Is About You)" (with Carly Simon)	Lawrence	4:26
17.	"I Want You"	Meyers	3:49
18.	"All Nite (Don't Stop)"	Lawrence	4:38
19.	"Just a Little While" (Live in London)		3:20

Extra features
No.	Title	Length
1.	"Damita Jo Interview"	9:17
2.	"Behind the Scenes of 'All Nite (Don't Stop)'"	5:09
3.	"Photo Slideshow"	3:46
4.	"All Nite (Don't Stop)" (MuchMoreMusic Live)	4:09
5.	"I Want You" (MuchMoreMusic Live)	4:35
6.	"All Nite (Don't Stop)" (On Air with Ryan Seacrest)	4:43
7.	"I Want You" (On Air with Ryan Seacrest)	4:03
8.	"Interview" (On Air with Ryan Seacrest)	5:50

== Release history ==
Release history for From Janet to Damita Jo: The Videos
Region	Date	Label
Europe	September 6, 2004	Virgin
United States	September 7, 2004	Virgin
Canada	September 7, 2004	Virgin
Japan	September 29, 2004	EMI
Australia	October 18, 2004	Virgin
