= Come On Get Up =

Promotional single by Janet Jackson

from the album All for You
- Released: November 13, 2001
- Recorded: 2001
- Studio: Flyte Tyme Studios, Edina, Minnesota
- Genre: Tribal house; pop
- Length: 4:47 (album version); 3:37 (radio version)
- Label: Virgin
- Songwriter(s): Janet Jackson; James Harris III, Terry Lewis; Dana Stinson
- Producer(s): Jackson; Jam; Lewis; Stinson

"Come On Get Up" is a song by American recording artist Janet Jackson from her seventh studio album, All for You (2001). A tribal house and pop song, it was written and produced by Jackson, Rockwilder, and Jam & Lewis.

It was released as a promotional single, exclusively released for airplay in Japan, where it reached number seven on the country's airplay chart. Jackson has only performed the song on the All for You Tour and on her 2019 Vegas residency, Janet Jackson: Metamorphosis. It was also included on her 2023 Together Again Tour.

== Song information ==
"Come On Get Up" was performed as the opening track for Jackson's All for You Tour, and was later released for airplay in Japan. It became the last single released from this album after "Son of a Gun (I Betcha Think This Song Is About You)." It was intended to be released as a commercial single, but was canceled when Jackson decided to end promotion for the album following the tour's conclusion. Promotional singles and vinyls were issued in Japan and North America. Jackson was originally scheduled to film a video for the song. Subsequently, Jackson started work on her following album, Damita Jo.

== Track listings and formats ==
Japanese promo CD single (JJ-0004)

1. "Come On Get Up" (Radio Version) – 3:37

U.S. 12" promo maxi single (VAULT 001)

- Side A:
1. "Come On Get Up" (John Ciafone Dub) – 6:41
- Side B:
1. "Come On Get Up" (Mood II Swing Vox) – 5:49
2. "Come On Get Up" (Mood II Swing Pacific Vox) – 5:02

== Official remixes ==
- "Come On Get Up" (Milk & Sugar Classic Mix) – 8:46
- "Come On Get Up" (Milk & Sugar Classic Radio Mix) – 3:39
- "Come On Get Up" (Milk & Sugar Retro Club Mix) – 8:37
- "Come On Get Up" (Milk & Sugar Retro Radio Mix) – 3:43
- "Come On Get Up" (Milk & Sugar Tribal Dub) – 6:17
- "Come On Get Up" (John Ciafone Dub) ^{1} – 7:05
- "Come On Get Up" (Manny Lehman Tribal Remix) – 4:08
- "Come On Get Up" (Mood II Swing Vox) ^{1} – 6:02
- "Come On Get Up" (Mood II Swing Pacific Vox Mix) ^{1} – 5:20
- "Come On Get Up" (Mood II Swing Pacific Club Mix) – 6:32
- "Come On Get Up" (Radio Edit) ^{1} – 3:37

^{1} Only versions released on vinyl or CD
