= All for You (Janet Jackson album) =

- Standard edition cover

Studio album by Janet Jackson
- Released: April 16, 2001
- Recorded: 2000–2001
- Studios: Flyte Tyme (Edina, Minnesota); Record One (Los Angeles); Record Plant (Los Angeles); Westlake (Los Angeles); Mirror Image (New York City)
- Genres: Pop; R&B
- Length: 73:01
- Label: Virgin
- Producers: Jimmy Jam and Terry Lewis; Janet Jackson; Rockwilder

Janet Jackson chronology
The Velvet Rope (1997)	All for You (2001)	Damita Jo (2004)

Singles from All for You
- 1. "All for You" Released: March 6, 2001; 2. "Someone to Call My Lover" Released: June 12, 2001; 3. "Son of a Gun (I Betcha Think This Song Is About You)" Released: November 6, 2001

All for You is the seventh studio album by American singer Janet Jackson. It was released on April 16, 2001, by Virgin Records. The album departed from the darker themes of her previous release, The Velvet Rope (1997), which addressed issues such as domestic violence and depression, instead embracing a more upbeat and lighthearted tone.

After her divorce from René Elizondo Jr., Jackson began working on her seventh studio album, All for You, aiming for a more carefree tone. She continued working with longtime collaborators Jimmy Jam and Terry Lewis, while also enlisting additional hip-hop producer Rockwilder, marking her first significant collaboration outside the duo since Control (1986). All for You is a pop and R&B album that incorporates elements of rock, disco, funk, soft rock, and East Asian music. Its lyrics center on themes of romance, passion, and sexuality, while also addressing betrayal and deceit. The album's explicit language and sexual content generated controversy, leading to bans in several countries.

The album was promoted with the critically and commercially successful All for You Tour. It produced three singles, including "All for You" and "Someone to Call My Lover". The former topped the US Billboard Hot 100 for seven consecutive weeks and reached the top ten of charts worldwide, while the latter peaked at number three in the US. All for You became Jackson's fifth consecutive album to reach number one on the US Billboard 200, logging the second-highest first-week sales for a female artist at the time. The album was certified multi-platinum by the Recording Industry Association of America and has sold an estimated seven million copies worldwide.

Critics generally responded positively to All for You, praising its production, upbeat tone, and Jackson's vocal performance. At the 44th Annual Grammy Awards in 2002, the album and its songs received three nominations, including Best Pop Vocal Album; the title track won Best Dance Recording. In support of the album, Jackson was named MTV's inaugural Icon and honored with the televised special MTV Icon: Janet Jackson, which recognized her contributions to music and popular culture. Retrospectively, critics have noted the influence of All for You on the works of artists such as Rihanna and Ariana Grande.

== Background and development ==
In 2000, Jackson was separated from René Elizondo Jr., exposing their secret nine-year marriage to the public as he filed for divorce, leading to intense media scrutiny. Amidst the divorce, Jackson began recording her seventh album. MTV News reported Jackson had nearly completed work on the "upbeat, fun and carefree" record, in contrast to the darker tone of her prior release. Producer Jimmy Jam stated, "This record now, even though it may not be the best of times in her personal life, she feels that the future is bright... She's excited about music and about life in general. She's excited about what the next year will hold for her, and that's the tone she's set for herself and [the album]." Jam added, "In the history of Janet, the records that are the happy records, that make people smile, have always traditionally been the more successful records.. going back as far to songs like 'When I Think of You' to 'Doesn't Really Matter.' This continues that tradition, with kind of a nod to the dance music of the '80s." Virgin Records' president Roy Cooper stated, "The new album is very bright, it's very upbeat and dynamic. She wanted to make an album that was rhythmically strong as well as melodically strong. She also wanted as explosive and strong a start as possible, and this certainly qualifies." Explaining its concept, Jackson said:

"I call my latest release All for You. The You is my fans who've stayed with me and watched me grow; the You is the mysterious force of love that's the source of creativity; and the You is also me. All for You is a suite of songs that helped me move from one emotional level to another. I'm the kind of artist who has no choice but to write what I feel. Velvet Rope took me inside my fears and frustrations. All for You has brought me outside, happy on a natural high, convinced that I really can express joy in the face of pain. My moods are changing. If you listen to the CD, you'll hear what I'm going through. There's anger, hurt, regret, even that familiar vein of severe self-criticism that I can't quite shake. (I still can't stand seeing any of my movies or concert tapes; I still cringe when I watch myself act or dance.) Yet there's also confidence. I hope this doesn't sound egotistical, but this time I stood alone and crafted my art according to my heart. I feel free, and there's nothing more wonderful than freedom."

== Recording and production ==
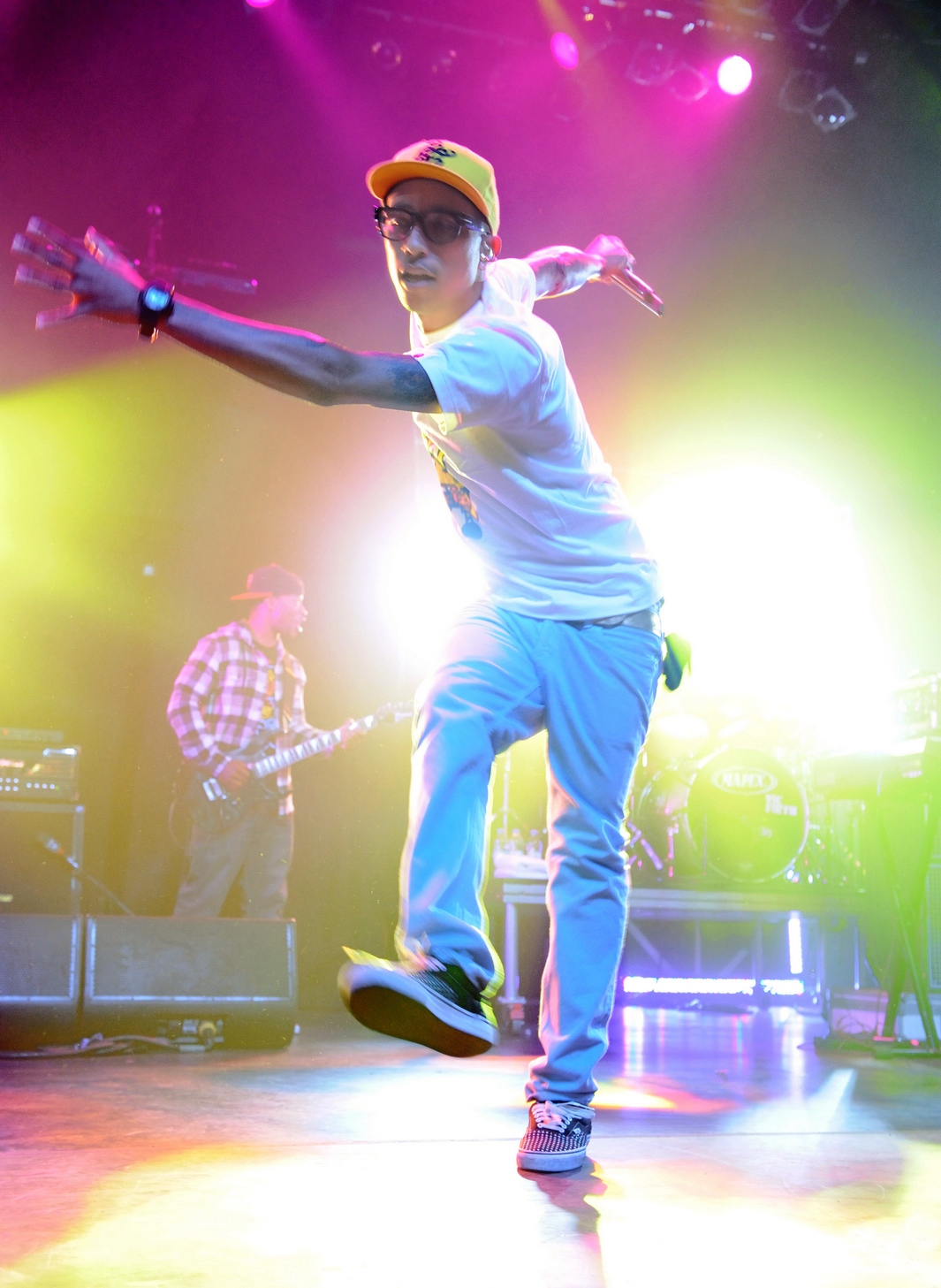
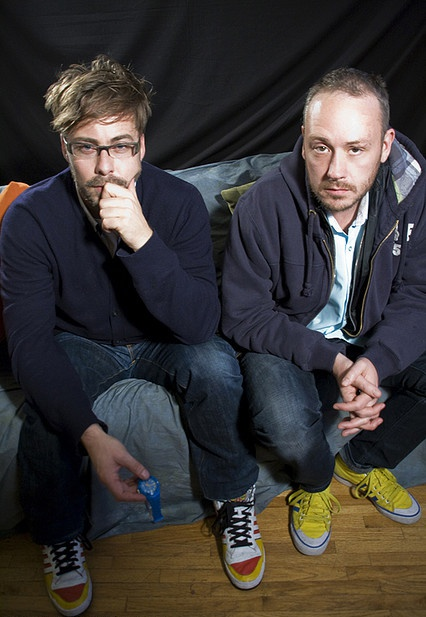
Jackson planned to record with the Neptunes and Basement Jaxx during the album's initial stages.

All for You marked the first time Jackson enlisted additional producers aside from Jam & Lewis since the release of her breakthrough Control (1986), collaborating with hip-hop producer Rockwilder. After recording exclusively with the duo, Jackson felt the desire to recruit new talent, explaining "I think it was The Velvet Rope that brought all of that to some sort of completion for me... it was very cathartic for me doing that — I felt it was OK to go out and explore other producers." She pursued Rockwilder upon hearing Method Man and Redman's single "Da Rockwilder", desiring uptempo productions in a similar vein. Jackson also collaborated with The Neptunes. Several confirmed titles included "Boys," "Ecstasy," "My Big Secret," and "What It Is." However, the songs did not make the final album, with "Boys" later recorded by Britney Spears and "What It Is" recorded by Kelis. Spears released "Boys" as a single in remix form with Pharrell Williams, referencing Jackson's hit "Nasty" during several lines and citing it as her favorite song to perform. Additionally, Spears' single "I'm a Slave 4 U" was originally written and produced for the album. "My Big Secret" was later recorded for Spears' In the Zone album, though was not released.

Upon expressing admiration for Basement Jaxx's debut album Remedy, Jackson contacted the house duo to collaborate. Jackson was offered to record the Jaxx's single "Get Me Off" for the album, though declined. She would later record several unreleased songs with them for her following album, Damita Jo. An unreleased collaboration with Jay-Z was recorded. Outkast also featured on an unreleased remix of "Someone to Call My Lover". Jackson had planned to record a duet with Aaliyah, intended to appear on All for You in addition to Aaliyah's self-titled album released several months later, though was unable to proceed due to scheduling conflicts. A collaboration with Missy Elliott titled "Nasty Girl 2000," an updated cover of Jackson's hit "Nasty," was intended to feature Jackson and additional vocals from Aaliyah, but was not recorded. Jackson also desired to collaborate with British singer Robbie Williams. The album intended to feature a house and hip-hop direction during its early stages, with other potential collaborators including Dallas Austin, Swizz Beatz, Diddy, Missy Elliott, Teddy Riley, Kandi Burruss, and Darrell "Delite" Allamby. However, the collaborations did not come to fruition due to scheduling conflicts while filming and periodic illness throughout recording. An unreleased song titled "New Beginning" appeared in initial press releases but was not included on the album.

== Composition ==
=== Themes and influences ===
"At times we all use our work to get through personal things, and in that regard the albums and the part in Nutty Professor II were really successful in giving her the incentive to strengthen herself. And I think through it she managed to find this sort of feeling that 'I'm OK with myself, and I have people who love me.' Because she wasn't thinking all that well of herself then."

— Jimmy Jam talks about Jackson's feelings while recording All for You.

During the divorce, Jackson decided to record an uptempo, optimistic album rather than songs about sadness or anger. Producer Jimmy Jam said, "You go through all these emotions and then you come out of it on the other side and say, "I'm going to be okay and I have a lot of things to be thankful for,' and that was the overriding feeling in her life when we were making this album." Its concept focuses largely on the demise of her marriage to René Elizondo, Jr. and subsequent embrace of the single life, experiencing dating for the first time. It also contains themes of sensuality, deceit, and betrayal. Jackson said, "It's a different thing for me. Growing up, I never dated. I'm doing that now, experiencing that whole life." Its upbeat tempo intended to reflect Jackson's self-esteem, described as "a work in progress." Jam commented, "She doesn't see herself the way other people see her. You know...gorgeous and sexy and all that. That isn't the kind of person she is. Although she is closer to feeling like that person now than she was 15 years ago. Or even three of four years ago." Jackson commented, "I look back at pictures of myself from four years ago and I see the unhappiness in my eyes. But I'm in the greatest space now... I believe we have choices and paths, and it's about choosing the right path, the promising path." While recording, Jackson listened to artists such as St. Germain, Buena Vista Social Club, Thievery Corporation, Basement Jaxx, Outkast and Papa Roach.

John Mulvey of Yahoo! Music noted that All For You was a concept album which was rooted in Jackson's "traumatic" separation from former husband and collaborator René Elizondo, Jr. and detailed that with its first tracks, the record starts "tremendously, with a bunch of party tracks illustrating a newly-free woman checking out men on the dancefloor", before moving "to the bedroom, and some explicit shagging tracks, before a virulent suite detailing what a bastard her ex is", and concludes with a "soppy phase heralding a new life and the prospects of new love." According to Stephen Thomas Erlewine of AllMusic, the album is divided into three segments: divorce, industry, and sex. However, MTV News perceived All for You as "dominated by two themes: the liberation that comes with ending a bad relationship, and sex," blending elements of pop, funk, R&B and rock.

=== Music and lyrics ===
The album's interludes consist of Jackson's recorded asides, placing clips from her one-sided conversations between the tracks. Its introduction finds Jackson impersonating actress Fran Drescher. The opening track, "You Ain't Right", is a scathing attack on a former associate, thought to be directed at her former choreographer, Tina Landon. It uses piston-like rhythms, drum machines and synthesizers; its production likened to "a thick sci-fi stomp that suggests a Gary Glitter glam-rock anthem crossed with the soundtrack from Blade Runner." "All for You" is an uptempo dance song utilizing elements of disco and funk. In a nightclub setting, Jackson encourages a man to approach her and imagines an erotic fantasy, admiring the man's "package" and desiring to fornicate. "Come On Get Up" follows with a "synth-frenzied splendor," fusing tribal house and dance-pop. "When We Oooo" consists of a mid-tempo arrangement, emphasizing Jackson's layered vocal harmonies as she describes a sexual encounter.

"Trust a Try"
Jackson incorporates orchestral and symphonic music with hard rock in "Trust a Try", regarded as "avant-garde".

"China Love" uses traditional Oriental textures such as gamelan chimes and tablas, as Jackson rhapsodizes about past-life romance and new age ambiguities. Jackson had written the song about her own prior identity in another time, in which she was told to be the daughter of an emperor in love with a warrior, unable to sustain relations when forced to marry into royalty. "Love Scene (Ooh Baby)" is an ambient ballad incorporating flourishes of electronica and guitars, performed in a falsetto to "exquisitely carnal effect." "Would You Mind" depicts Janet confessing a graphic list of myriad sexual desires, conducting a heavy-breathing seminar followed by a risqué "performance evaluation" over a "spacey electro thump." It was described to feature "more moaning than a hospital emergency room," with Jackson singing, "I'm gonna kiss you/Suck you/Taste you." Throughout the song, Jackson requests sexual intercourse, oral sex, and internal ejaculation; as she instructs her lover, "Oh, yeah, baby, just like that." Its erotic nature was regarded as the album's most controversial track in numerous reviews. Jackson expresses a lack of sexual satisfaction in following interlude "Lame," unable to climax.

The "avant-garde" aura of "Trust a Try" fuses elements of mock-operetta and hard rock with classical music, dance, and hip-hop. In the song, Jackson delivers an "angry aria" of betrayal. Its "rock 'n' roll sass" is laced with theatrical vocal arrangements, electric guitars, violins and cinematic strings. The following track, "Son of a Gun (I Betcha Think This Song Is About You)" features spoken vocals from singer-songwriter Carly Simon and interpolates Simon's hit "You're So Vain." Its composition excoriates an unfaithful lover for attempting to extort money, described as a "mean-spirited duet that rails against enemies." Jackson unveils anger and deceit, saying "Thought you'd get the money too / Greedy motherfuckers try to have their cake and eat it too." In response to critics regarding it about her divorce, Jackson explained it was directed towards several people, while Jimmy Jam revealed it to be written in regards to music executives and lawyers. On the ballad "Truth", Jackson discusses a failed romance with her former husband. Jackson revealed that the track was her "talking out loud to myself about the relationship. I felt the need to address it on the album, but just once."

"Someone to Call My Lover" is a soft rock song, described as an "innocent daydream for the perfect man built over the acoustic guitar." Its speaks of the yearnings for "love and togetherness," desiring to find a new companion. It uses a guitar motif sampled from America's "Ventura Highway." "Feels So Right" is a mid-tempo ballad using a "fluffy" eighties-influenced texture. "Doesn't Really Matter" is an uptempo dance song, incorporating slight flourishes of Oriental music and strings. Jackson speaks of disregarding physical appearance, choosing to love the person inside. Released as the theme for Jackson's second film The Nutty Professor II: The Klumps, it features an alternate introduction and instrumental breakdown not included in the single edit. The closing track, "Better Days" is a "sweepingly orchestrated" ballad melding soft rock and electronic music, shifting to uptempo during its chorus. It incorporates slight elements of drum and bass during its second verse. It ends the album on a note of uplift, featuring a strong vocal with a guitar solo and "striking" strings. Regarding the song, Jackson said, "I feel light and almost giddy about untying the knots that were choking me, restraining me, preventing my growth... I'm interested in making strides, taking chances, finding my own way in my own time."

== Release and promotion ==
=== Live appearances ===
A month prior to the album's release, MTV aired an inaugural special entitled MTV Icon: Janet Jackson, declaring Jackson the network's first musical icon while celebrating her career and influence in pop culture. Jackson was honored "in recognition of her place as one of the most influential and beloved tastemakers in contemporary pop... The show will eloquently demonstrate the impact that Janet has had, not only on her worldwide audience, but also on a generation of performers who will pay tribute by covering her songs." Jackson stated, "When I heard that MTV wanted to honor me with the show "Icon," I was speechless. I really was. It is an awesome thing—I feel young. There's still so much more that I want to do, need to do, for myself in this business. And I was just so surprised. But a wonderful surprise." Numerous artists paid tribute to Jackson and commemorated her success, including Britney Spears, Jessica Simpson, Jennifer Lopez, Christina Aguilera, Aaliyah, Tommy Lee, Michael Jackson, and producers Jimmy Jam and Terry Lewis. It featured performances by NSYNC, Pink, Buckcherry, Usher, Outkast, Mýa, and Destiny's Child. Jackson performed "All for You" and "You Ain't Right" at the finale. The event was the highest rated television show of the night, ahead of all broadcast and cable programs among the youth demographic. Promotional ads for the special depicted Jackson's music, videos, and sexuality shocking conservative audiences and families, using the tagline "The world wasn't always ready for Janet. We are."

All for You was first released on April 16, 2001 in Japan, April 23 in the UK, and April 24 in North America. Its artwork features Jackson lying in a suggestive pose, the central portion of her anatomy is covered only by a white sheet. For promotion, Jackson performed on various entertainment shows, including Top of the Pops, CD:UK, Wetten Dass, Hit Machine, ECHO Awards, and the TMF Awards. She appeared on Larry King Live and the Late Show with David Letterman, attending The Rosie O'Donnell Show the following day. She also gave interviews to BBC Radio 1 and NRJ Radio while in Europe. In April, she appeared on MTV's TRL and MuchMusic before presenting on VH1 Divas. Jackson later presented at the 2001 MTV Video Music Awards, also paying tribute to late singer Aaliyah. Jackson was awarded numerous career accolades throughout the campaign, including the Billboard Music Award's "Artistic Achievement Award", American Music Award's "Award of Merit", and Nickelodeon Kids' Choice Award's "Wannabe Award". Jackson was selected to appear on the cover of the premiere issue of Blender, launched as an alternative to Rolling Stone. A limited-edition reissue of the album was announced on October 21, 2001, via Billboard, and released on November 20, 2001, including a bonus DVD, titled Janet: The Virgin Years, featuring Jackson's complete videography (excluding releases via other labels and collaborations), interviews and behind the scenes footage, spanning from the promotion of janet. (1993) to the making of All for You. The reissue features an alternate cover artwork and contains the clean edition of the album without "Would You Mind" in addition to the Flyte Tyme single edit and P. Diddy remix of the album's third single "Son of a Gun (I Betcha Think This Song Is About You)"; it was also intended to include a twenty-four page photo booklet of Jackson's All for You Tour, but it was omitted for unknown reasons. Furthermore, MSN launched an ISP service titled "Janet on MSN", with Jackson also given her own online radio station.

The following year, Jackson was selected to perform at the Super Bowl XXXVI halftime show, though allowed U2 to perform in order to tribute the events of September 11 and due to traveling concerns following the tragedy.

=== Tour ===
In support of the album, Jackson embarked on her fourth world tour, the All for You Tour. The first dates were announced between July and October, in Canada and the United States. The North American leg wrapped in November in Wilkes-Barre, Pennsylvania. Several dates were scheduled in Japan the following year, although the tour's European leg was required to be canceled immediately following the events of September 11 attacks, when many dancers were unwilling to travel citing safety concerns. Jackson said, "I have agonized over this decision. Like most people, the events of Sept. 11 have troubled me enormously and I remain concerned about the foreseeable future. If anything happened to anyone on this tour, I could never forgive myself." An appearance at the 2001 MTV Europe Music Awards was also canceled due to the tragedy. It was the sixth highest-grossing tour of the year, also ranked the third most successful by Pollstar. Its broadcast on HBO received over 12 million viewers, among the network's highest ratings, and increased album sales by fifty percent. It was later released on DVD as Janet: Live in Hawaii. The tour received positive reviews, with Craig Seymour from Buffalo News writing "her All for You tour marked another milestone for the veteran artist, who proved to be more comfortable with own ability to command an audience than ever before." It was considered an influence to many of her followers, adding "Jackson remains one of this generation's most exciting performers in concert, easily triumphing over the likes of young upstarts Britney Spears, Christina Aguilera and Destiny's Child. The Los Angeles Times stated, "Not only is Janet emulated by the type of show she puts on by the current teen-fab (that she made popular years ago), she still does it better than the 19-year-olds."

=== Singles ===
The title track was sent to radio stations as the album's lead single on March 6, 2001. It broke several airplay records upon its debut, being the first song in history to be added to every pop, urban, and rhythmic radio station within its first week of release, and also had the highest first-week audience impressions in history. Kevin McCabe of Radio & Records noted that "no other song has conquered all reporting stations in its first week at radio, let alone mastered three formats in one week". It was also the highest debut for a single not commercially available in the United States and France. It became Jackson's most successful single in the US since "That's the Way Love Goes" (1993), staying at number one for seven weeks. Internationally, the song reached the top ten in most countries worldwide. Its music video received four MTV Video MTV Video Music Awards nominations, including Video of the Year and Best Female Video.

"Someone to Call My Lover" was released as the second single on June 12, 2001. It was also a success, peaking at number three on the Hot 100 for three consecutive weeks. The song became a top ten and twenty hit internationally. It earned a Grammy Award nomination for Best Female Pop Vocal Performance. The third single, "Son of a Gun (I Betcha Think This Song Is About You)," was remixed to feature Missy Elliott and additional vocals from Carly Simon. Released on November 6, 2001, it peaked at number twenty-eight on the Billboard Hot 100, and the top fifteen and thirty of many countries internationally, also reaching number thirteen in Europe. Its single version was later included as a bonus track on the album's re-release. "Trust a Try" was also intended to be released as a single, with Jackson expressing her intention in an interview. However, its release as a single did not come to fruition.

== Critical reception ==
Professional ratings
Aggregate scores
Source	Rating
Metacritic	73/100
Review scores
Source	Rating
AllMusic	3.5/5 stars
Christgau's Consumer Guide	B−
Entertainment Weekly	B
Dotmusic	3.5/5 stars
Los Angeles Times	2/4 stars
NME	2.5/5 stars
Pitchfork	7.8/10
Playlouder	4/5 stars
Rolling Stone	3.5/5 stars
Slant Magazine	2/5 stars
USA Today	3/4 stars

All for You received generally positive reviews from music critics. At Metacritic, which assigns a normalized rating out of 100 to reviews from mainstream critics, the album received an average score of 73. Stephen Thomas Erlewine of AllMusic favored All for You over her last studio album, The Velvet Rope, calling it "alluring, easily enveloping the listener." Erlewine added, "This is her sexiest-sounding record, thanks to Jam and Lewis' silky groove and her breathy delivery, two things that make the record palatable." Tom Sinclair of Entertainment Weekly gave the album a 'B' rating, saying, "Despite a few missteps, All for You is about as good as modern diva-pop gets, with a higher ratio of worthy-to-mediocre songs than might be expected... it adds up to a lot more than most female singers have done for us lately."

Anthony DeCurtis of Rolling Stone gave the album three-and-a-half out of five stars, declaring it "just as fresh, familiar and appealing as you've come to expect from Jackson, and that's no small achievement." Gene Stout of The Seattle Post-Intelligencer called All for You "one of the best of her career," while John Mulvey of Yahoo! Music UK referred to it as "her most unnerving and plausible character thus far." Mulvey added, "This is a much more satisfying album than The Velvet Rope, even if most of the songs are overlong and a few juggle satin sheet-cliches with self-help ones to numbing effect. Nevertheless, All for You stands as a monument to the positive effects of divorce."

Rating it three out of four stars, Steve Jones of USA Today commented. "the singer is in a sexy, fun-loving mood […] While she overdoes the between-song interludes here, she never fails to get you to move. When it comes to burning up a dance floor, she is still Ms. Jackson." Jon Pareles of The New York Times stated, "Ms. Jackson luxuriates in textures as dizzying as a new infatuation," commended the album as containing "songs so baroquely sumptuous that they're virtually experimental." Pareles added, "Boudoir ballads undulate in torrid slow motion while Ms. Jackson moans like a phone-sex operator, and uptempo tunes hark back to disco, splice mock-operetta to hard rock or, in Better Days, conjure an easy-listening 1960's-pop apotheosis." Her vocals were also praised, saying "Countless overdubs of Ms. Jackson's voice turn her into an airborne choir; computer rhythms thump and sizzle." He concluded saying the album "isn't as immediately melodic as Ms. Jackson's previous albums, but it compensates for lost catchiness with unabashed strangeness."

Sal Cinquemani of Slant Magazine called it "generally upbeat and positive", commending her return to making "fun and cheery pop music." The Tech stated, "All for You as a whole makes for fun listening. Bouncing from orgiastic sex music to bubble gum pop music to soulful ballads, the album contains a true range of music... At any rate, bubble gum pop, easy as it comes, gets a twist with Janet, elegantly escorted with acoustic guitars and the whole gamut of computerized yet natural-sounding instrumentals. Perhaps what sells the album, more than the songs, is Janet's voice and her innovative (and frankly, courageous) use of beats and harmonies. Janet's voice is as pristine as ever, and, never outshined... she overpowers every track."

== Accolades ==
Upon the release of All for You, Jackson was awarded Billboard's Artistic Achievement Award. Jackson also received four nominations at the Billboard Music Awards ceremony. She had also been the recipient of the American Music Award's "Award of Merit," awarded to artists who provide "major contributions to the musical entertainment of the American public," and the Recording Academy's "Governor's Award." Jackson received three nominations at the 44th Annual Grammy Awards, winning Best Dance Recording for "All for You", and nominated for Best Pop Vocal Album and Best Female Pop Vocal Performance for "Someone to Call My Lover." She received the American Music Award for Favorite Pop/Rock Female Artist and was nominated for Favorite Soul/R&B Album.

Year	Ceremony	Category	Recipient	Result
2001	American Music Awards	Award of Merit	Herself	Won
2001	Billboard Music Awards	Artistic Achievement Award	Herself	Won
2001	Billboard Music Awards	Female Artist of the Year	Herself	Nominated
2001	Billboard Music Awards	Hot 100 Singles Artist of the Year	Herself	Nominated
2001	Billboard Music Awards	Female Hot 100 Singles Artist of the Year	Herself	Nominated
2001	Billboard Music Awards	Hot 100 Single of the Year	"All for You"	Nominated
2001	Billboard Music Awards	Top-Selling R&B/Hip-Hop Single	"All for You"	Won
2001	NAACP Image Awards	Outstanding Female Artist	Herself	Nominated
2001	NAACP Image Awards	Outstanding Music Video	"All for You"	Nominated
2001	Japan Gold Disc Awards	Top Selling Single of the Year for Foreign Music	"Doesn't Really Matter"	Won
2001	Japan Radio Popular Disks Awards	Record of the Year	"All for You"	Won
2001	Japan Radio Popular Disks Awards	Best Female Vocalist	Herself	Won
2001	MTV Video Music Awards	Video of the Year	"All for You"	Nominated
2001	MTV Video Music Awards	Best Female Video	"All for You"	Nominated
2001	MTV Video Music Awards	Best Dance Video	"All for You"	Nominated
2001	MTV Video Music Awards	Best Choreography in a Video	"All for You"	Nominated
2001	MTV Europe Music Awards	Best Female	Herself	Nominated
2001	MTV Europe Music Awards	Best R&B	Herself	Nominated
2001	MuchMusic Video Awards	Best International Artist	Herself	Nominated
2001	MuchMusic Video Awards	People's Choice Award	Herself	Won
2001	People	Best Albums of the Year	All for You	Won
2001	Rolling Stone	Reader's Choice Award — Favorite Album Cover	All for You	Won
2001	Teen Choice Awards	Best Single	"All for You"	Won
2001	Teen Choice Awards	Best Album	All for You	Won
2001	Teen Choice Awards	Best Female	Herself	Nominated
2001	Teen People Awards	Hottest Song of 2001	"All for You"	Nominated
2001	TMF Awards	Lifetime Achievement Award	Herself	Won
2001	TMF Awards	Best International Female Singer	Herself	Nominated
2001	VH1 My Music Awards	My Favorite Female	Herself	Won
2001	VH1 My Music Awards	Hottest Live Show	Herself	Won
2002	American Music Awards	Favorite Pop/Rock Female Artist	Herself	Won
2002	American Music Awards	Internet Artist of the Year	Herself	Nominated
2002	American Music Awards	Favorite Soul/R&B Album	All for You	Nominated
2002	BMI Pop Awards	Most Played Song	"All for You"	Won
2002	BMI Pop Awards	Most Played Song	"Doesn't Really Matter"	Won
2002	BMI Pop Awards	Most Played Song	"Someone to Call My Lover"	Won
2002	BMI Urban Awards	Song of the Year	"All for You"	Won
2002	Primetime Emmy Awards	Outstanding Multi-Camera Picture Editing For A Miniseries, Movie Or A Special	Janet: Live in Hawaii	Nominated
2002	Essence Awards	Reader's Choice Award for Entertainer of the Year	Herself	Won
2002	Grammy Awards	Best Dance Recording	"All for You"	Won
2002	Grammy Awards	Best Pop Vocal Album	All for You	Nominated
2002	Grammy Awards	Best Female Pop Vocal Performance	"Someone to Call My Lover"	Nominated
2002	International Dance Music Awards	Best Dance Video	"All for You"	Won
2002	Japan Gold Disc Awards	Top Selling Pop Album of the Year	All for You	Won
2002	MVPA Awards	Best Choreography	"All for You"	Won
2002	MVPA Awards	Best Cinematography	"Son of a Gun (I Betcha Think This Song Is About You)"	Nominated
2002	MVPA Awards	Best Make Up	"Son of a Gun (I Betcha Think This Song Is About You)"	Won
2002	MVPA Awards	Best Video	"Someone to Call My Lover"	Won
2002	MVPA Awards	Best Hair	"Someone to Call My Lover"	Nominated
2002	NABOB Awards	Entertainer of the Year	Herself	Won
2002	Nickelodeon Kids' Choice Awards	Wannabe Award	Herself	Won
2002	Nickelodeon Kids' Choice Awards	Favorite Female Singer	Herself	Nominated
2002	Recording Academy	Governor's Award	Herself	Won
2002	Teen Choice Awards	Best Female	Herself	Nominated

== Commercial performance ==
All for You debuted at number one on the US Billboard 200, selling 605,000 copies in its first week. At the time of its release, it had the second highest opening sales from a female artist in SoundScan history, only behind Britney Spears's Oops!...I Did It Again, and tenth highest overall. As of 2014, the album has the fifteenth highest first week sales by a female solo artist. It placed at number two in its second week, with 310,000 copies sold. In its third week, it sold 215,000 copies, placing at number three. It sold 149,000 copies the following week, achieving an estimated total of 1,279,128 copies sold within its first month of release. It also opened at number one in Canada, with first week sales of 37,200 and in South Africa with 44,722 copies sold in its first week.

All for You was a commercial success internationally, debuting within the top three of Australia, Belgium, France, Germany, Greece, South Korea, Switzerland, and the United Kingdom. It also opened within the top five of Denmark, the Netherlands, Japan, Norway, and Sweden. It debuted within the top ten of Austria, Italy, New Zealand, and Spain, and the top twenty of Ireland and Poland. It peaked at number two on European Top 100 Albums. In February 2014, it debuted at number thirty-nine on South Korea's Gaon Chart.

The album was certified double platinum by the Recording Industry Association of America (RIAA) on May 18, 2001, denoting two million units shipped. It was certified gold in Australia, Belgium, Denmark, France, Germany, New Zealand, Switzerland, and the United Kingdom. It was certified triple platinum in Canada and Japan, where it became the biggest selling international pop album of the year, and quadruple platinum in South Africa. As of September 2009, All for You has sold 3,107,000 copies in the United States, according to Nielsen SoundScan. It also sold an additional 100,000 copies through BMG Music Club. All for You was the 12th best-selling album of 2001, selling 5 million copies worldwide in that year according to the International Federation of the Phonographic Industry (IFPI). As of 2021, the album has sold more than seven million copies worldwide.

== Controversy ==
'Would You Mind'
Jackson longs for sexual intercourse and orgasm in "Would You Mind", causing the album to be banned by law officials in several countries.

Despite explicit language and sexual content, initial album pressings did not contain a Parental Advisory warning. A clean version of the album was released exclusively at Walmart stores, censoring several songs for language, as well as omitting "Would You Mind" completely. The album was re-released in late 2001 with a Parental Advisory label, along with a new bonus track; a remix of "Son of a Gun". A clean version with the added remix was also released (with "Would You Mind" still omitted), and became more widely available than the original clean version. Regarding the content, Jackson stated "I do understand that for the younger audience, All for You is a pretty heavy record. For them I've made an altered version. I've been asked to watch my mouth a little, but hell no! This is me, this is what I want to do, so accept it. I don't want to live my life controlled by other people."

Upon its release, All for You was banned in Singapore after the Publications Appeal Committee decided the album's lyrics, in particular "Would You Mind", were "not acceptable to our society". The country's law officials had previously banned Jackson's prior album, The Velvet Rope, due to three songs containing lyrics about homosexuality. Several retail chains, including Wherehouse Music affixed their own "explicit content" labels to the album. RIAA president Hilary Rosen stated, "We don't think retailers should have to do that. That's the label's responsibility, and EMI [Virgin's parent company] has assumed that responsibility." In response to the incident, Jackson said:

"The album has been banned in certain countries... I was told they would be happy to go ahead with it if I were to take the sensual songs off the album. And I thought, 'Wow, that's weird.' Here I am talking about love and expressing myself in a way I feel at least most of us do in the bedroom, and it is something so beautiful, so positive and wonderful, yet they want me to put a blindfold over the public's eyes about this. Yet there is all that violence... I am not going to change the album and who I am because of that. This is another side of me that I am expressing and feeling so comfortable in doing so."

== Impact and legacy ==
"On Janet Jackson's latest disc, All for You – the follow-up to her 1997 hit disc, The Velvet Rope – the wispy-voiced singer is sailing uncharted waters for female pop, acting flirty, talking dirty and leaving the blond chicks in the dust... And that's the beauty of this album and Jackson as an artist – there is a clear willingness to experiment."

— Dan Aquilante, New York Post

The album achieved several chart records, attaining the second highest first-week sales for a female artist in SoundScan history at the time. Lead single "All for You" became the first song to be added to every pop, urban, and rhythmic radio format within its first week of release, and was the highest debut for a single not commercially available in both the United States and France. It had the highest debut and largest opening airplay figure on the Radio Songs chart, debuting at number nine with an audience impression of 70 million. It was also the biggest selling international single of the year in Japan. The album received three Grammy Award nominations for Best Pop Vocal Album and Best Female Pop Vocal Performance for "Someone to Call My Lover," winning Best Dance Recording for "All for You." The album won Top Pop Album of the Year at the Japan Gold Disc Awards. Billboard ranked All for You at number 141 on the "Top 200 Albums of the Decade." Sputnikmusic placed it at number 43 on their list of "Best Pop Albums of 2001."

AllMusic's Stephen Thomas Erlewine stated that the album's signature hits "All for You" and "Doesn't Really Matter" uphold "Janet, Jam, and Lewis' reputation as the leading lights of contemporary urban soul." Piers Martin of NME felt All for You was an "over-produced album of predictable designer funk." People Magazine ranked it among the year's best albums, stating, "Take that, Britney! Move over, J.Lo! With a new generation of dance-pop divas following in her fancy footsteps, the baby Jackson shows who is still in control with this all-encompassing album that bounces from hip-hop to rock to classical—even during the same song—without missing a funky beat." Dennis Kelly of The Morning Call added, "If imitators such as Britney Spears, Christina Aguilera, et al., are quiet the next few months, it's because the Queen of Pop has sent them back to class with new material to study." Charles Taylor of Salon exclaimed Jackson "has turned into a more interesting figure than Madonna, and a maker of better music." The Foreign Correspondents' Club of Japan announced Jackson to be the highest paid recording artist in history, signing a contract with Virgin Records in the mid of the 90's worth $90 million, and was declared to have surpassed the influence of Michael Jackson. MTV News also noted the album's first week sales nearly doubled those of Michael's Invincible, released later that year.

Steve Burgess of Salon stated, "Janet Jackson may well be the beneficiary of contemporary pop's Lilliputian landscape", surpassing "her less-talented peers". Burgess added, "More often, though, a Janet Jackson song on the radio is a deluxe buffet set up on a compost heap. Pass the sauerkraut." Dan Aquilante of The New York Post wrote, "Jackson has written a 14-song manual that explains not only how you can please her, but lists the rewards in store for those who manage the task... While Mothers Against Everything will be appalled by Janet's dirty pillow talk, many adult ears will find it very sexy, wrapped around the listenable Lewis/Jam beats." Jackson also received MTV's inaugural Icon tribute. The Sun Sentinel stated, "Before Britney Spears and Christina Aguilera, there was Janet Jackson, with her choreographed songs and trendsetting fashion," with the special intended as a "star-studded salute to the singer-songwriter-actress." MTV News added, "Pop Lolitas-of-the-week may come and go, but this Jackson, it seems, is forever."

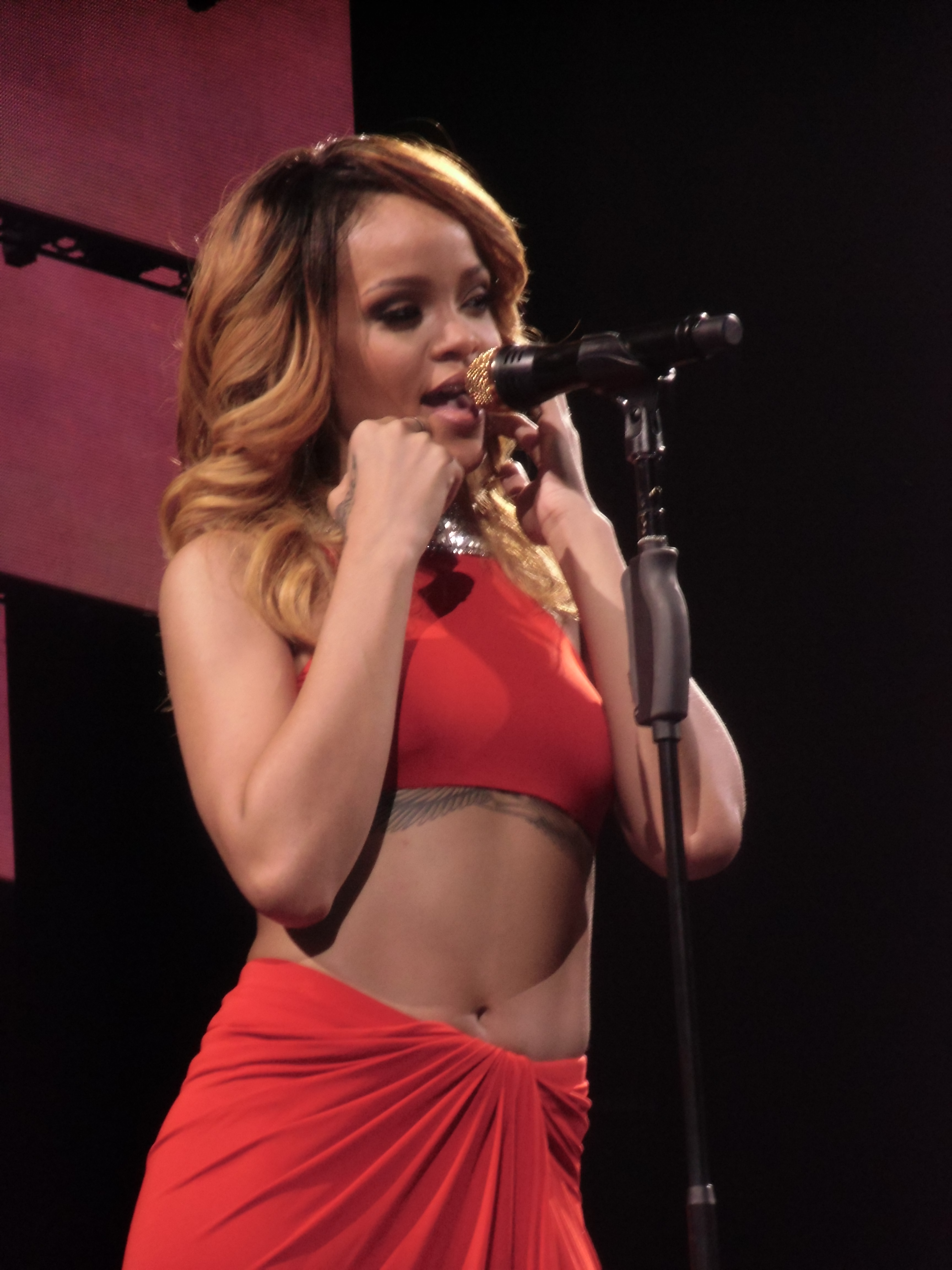
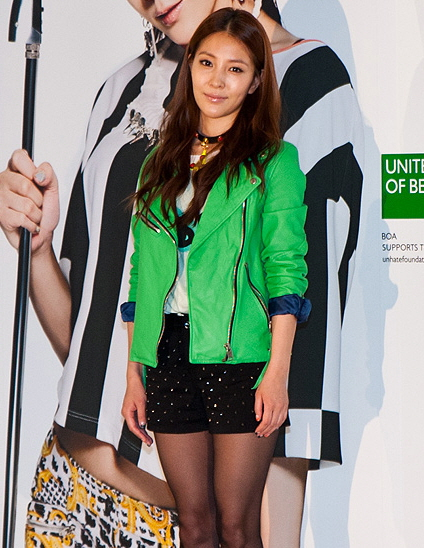
Critics have observed Rihanna and BoA to be influenced by the album.

Entertainment journalist Kelley L. Carter regarded it among "the most influential albums to be released since 2000," declaring it "set the tone for much of what we're hearing on the radio from current female pop stars. Anything Rihanna, Beyoncé and Britney are doing right now, was heard on this album." Its fusion of "old-school pop sounds" with rhythmic influences are thought to be frequently emulated; adding "She sang about female empowerment, even though hers is a voice that is lightweight, and it demanded that you take listen to it."

The "funkier and hipper" style of Britney Spears' third album Britney was thought to emulate All for You with "reasonable success" in multiple songs. Spears' song "Anticipating" was considered to be directly influenced by the album's title track. Two singles from the album, "I'm a Slave 4 U" and "Boys," were originally written and produced for All for You; the latter also recorded by Jackson. Spears also recorded another unreleased Jackson song titled "My Big Secret" for her fourth album, In the Zone, though it did not make the final release.

Rihanna's fifth studio album Loud and single "Only Girl (In the World)" drew several comparisons to All for You, with critics noting its sonic transition to an upbeat dance sound from prior release Rated R in a similar vein to Jackson's contrast from the darker tone of The Velvet Rope. Eric Henderson of Slant Magazine stated, "like Janet's album, Loud is a step away from its über-personal, melodrama-drenched predecessor." Throughout the campaign, Rihanna also evoked Jackson's Velvet Rope era imagery. Ne-Yo's "Say It" was thought to resemble the album's sensual ballads. Record producer Rockwilder revealed Jackson to be his first pop collaboration and an essential part of his career, leading him to work with Christina Aguilera for the singles "Lady Marmalade" and "Dirrty." Rolling Stone likened the production of Aaliyah's self-titled third album to the record. Sal Cinquemani of Slant observed several songs on Usher's 8701 to recall "bona fide Janet Jackson tracks" similar to the album. Christina Milian's debut album was considered to be heavily influenced by the album. The sensual content and interludes of Missy Elliott's This Is Not a Test! also drew comparisons to the album's exploration of similar themes. Following All for You being reissued with a Parental Advisory warning and clean edition, Jennifer Lopez's sophomore album J.Lo received a similar treatment by Epic Records, thought to be influenced by Jackson's decision after media emphasis was placed on its explicit language and content.

Several album tracks gained notoriety within the entertainment industry, in particular "Would You Mind" due to its racy composition and explicit sexual content. Erotic Revolutionaries author Shayne Lee called the song "a bold and proactive sexual maneuver for even a twenty-first century woman," adding, "she tells her man she's going to kiss, touch, lick, taste, bathe, ride, and feel him deep insider her. She ends the song by requesting that he come inside of her and let his juices flow deep in her passion." Its shock value was considered "enough to make Donna Summer's "Love to Love You Baby" sound like Christian rock." Its explicit lyrics caused the album to be banned in several conservative countries such as Singapore. The song was used in films such as stoner comedy How High. Its "gravity defying and mouth watering" live rendition was regarded among the most controversial performances of her career. In 2012, it was ranked the steamiest song of her discography; an anecdote saying, "This song is so racy people use it as a euphemism when talking about what they did the night before when children are present." "Trust a Try" also received critical focus for its innovation, called a "bold musical move" which "begins with the intricacies of a string quartet before falling into metal attack"; thought to be "within spitting distance of the avant-garde."

== Track listing ==
All for You – Standard edition
No.	Title	Writer(s)	Producer(s)	Length
1.	"Intro"			1:00
2.	"You Ain't Right"	Janet Jackson; James Harris III; Terry Lewis; Dana Stinson	Rockwilder; Jackson; Jimmy Jam and Terry Lewis	4:32
3.	"All for You"	Jackson; Harris; Lewis; Wayne Garfield; David Romani; Mauro Malavasi	Jackson; Jam & Lewis	5:29
4.	"2wayforyou" (Interlude)			0:19
5.	"Come On Get Up"	Jackson; Harris; Lewis; Stinson	Rockwilder; Jackson; Jam & Lewis	4:47
6.	"When We Oooo"	Jackson; Harris; Lewis	Jackson; Jam & Lewis	4:34
7.	"China Love"	Jackson; Harris; Lewis	Jackson; Jam & Lewis	4:36
8.	"Love Scene (Ooh Baby)"	Jackson; Harris; Lewis	Jackson; Jam & Lewis	4:16
9.	"Would You Mind^{[a]}"	Jackson; Harris; Lewis; Stinson	Rockwilder; Jackson; Jam & Lewis	5:31
10.	"Lame" (Interlude)			0:11
11.	"Trust a Try"	Jackson; Harris; Lewis; Stinson	Rockwilder; Jackson; Jam & Lewis	5:16
12.	"Clouds" (Interlude)			0:19
13.	"Son of a Gun (I Betcha Think This Song Is About You)" (with Carly Simon)	Jackson; Harris; Lewis; Carly Simon	Jackson; Jam & Lewis	5:56
14.	"Truth"	Jackson; Harris; Lewis; James Wright; Stan Vincent	Jackson; Jam & Lewis	6:45
15.	"Theory" (Interlude)			0:26
16.	"Someone to Call My Lover"	Jackson; Harris; Lewis; Dewey Bunnell	Jackson; Jam & Lewis	4:32
17.	"Feels So Right"	Jackson; Harris; Lewis; Stinson	Rockwilder; Jackson; Jam & Lewis	4:42
18.	"Doesn't Really Matter" (from Nutty Professor II: The Klumps)	Jackson; Harris; Lewis	Jackson; Jam & Lewis	4:24
19.	"Better Days"	Jackson; Harris; Lewis	Jackson; Jam & Lewis	5:05
20.	"Outro"			0:09
Total length:				73:01

All for You – Japanese edition (bonus track)
No.	Title	Writer(s)	Producer(s)	Length
21.	"Who"	Jackson; Harris; Lewis; Stinson	Rockwilder; Jackson; Jam & Lewis	3:45
Total length:				76:46

All for You – Asian reissue edition (bonus tracks)
No.	Title	Writer(s)	Producer(s)	Length
20.	"Son of a Gun (I Betcha Think This Song Is About You)" (Original Flyte Tyme remix) (with Carly Simon and featuring Missy Elliott)	Jackson; Harris; Lewis; Simon	Jam & Lewis	4:14
21.	"Son of a Gun (I Betcha Think This Song Is About You)" (P. Diddy Remix) (with Carly Simon and featuring Missy Elliott)	Jackson; Harris; Lewis; Simon; Elliott; Sean Combs	P. Diddy (remixed by)	5:07
Total length:				78:08

All for You – Limited video deluxe edition (bonus DVD)
No.	Title	Director(s)	Length
1.	"That's the Way Love Goes"	Rene Elizondo Jr.	3:45
2.	"If"	Dominic Sena	5:15
3.	"Again"	Elizondo Jr.	4:21
4.	"Because of Love"	Beth McCarthy	4:12
5.	"Any Time, Any Place"	Keir McFarlane	4:40
6.	"You Want This"	McFarlane	5:14
7.	"janet. – Behind the Scenes"		15:09
8.	"Got 'til It's Gone"	Mark Romanek	4:11
9.	"Together Again"	Seb Janiak	4:20
10.	"Together Again" (Deeper Remix)	Elizondo Jr.	4:04
11.	"I Get Lonely"	Paul Hunter	4:40
12.	"Go Deep"	Jonathan Dayton and Valerie Faris	4:54
13.	"You"	David Mallet	4:13
14.	"Every Time"	Matthew Rolston	4:17
15.	"The Velvet Rope – Behind the Scenes"		10:12
16.	"All for You"	David Meyers	4:36
17.	"Someone to Call My Lover"	Francis Lawrence	4:33
18.	"All for You – Behind the Scenes"		7:20
19.	"MTV Icon Performance – "All for You""		6:30
Total length:			106:26

Sample credits

- "All for You" contains a sample from "The Glow of Love", as performed by Change.
- "China Love" contains a sample from "Moonlight City Roa", as performed by Yoko Shimomura from the Legend of Mana soundtrack.
- "Son of a Gun (I Betcha Think This Song Is About You)" contains a sample from "You're so Vain", as performed by Carly Simon.
- "Truth" contains an interpolation of "O-o-h Child", performed by the Five Stairsteps.
- "Someone to Call My Lover" contains samples from "Ventura Highway", as performed by America, and "Gymnopedié No. 1", as performed by Erik Satie.

Notes

- ^{^a} "Would You Mind" is not included on clean versions of the album or releases in Asia (excluding Japan) due to explicit content.

== Personnel ==
- Michael Abbott – engineer
- Alex Al – bass
- David Anthony – producer
- David Ashton – assistant engineer
- David Barry – guitar
- Lee Blaske – string arrangements
- Mike Bozzi – assistant mastering engineer
- Evelina Chao – viola
- Nathaniel Cole – violin
- Fran Cooper – make-up
- D-Man – remixing, mixing
- Jonathan Dayton – video director
- P. Diddy – remixing
- Sean Donnelly – design, animation
- René Elizondo Jr. – video director
- Missy Elliott – performer
- Valerie Faris – video director
- Brian Gardner – mastering
- Charles Gray – viola
- Gael Guilarte – assistant engineer
- Jeri Heiden – art direction
- Steve Hodge – engineer, mixing
- Janet Jackson – vocals, producer, executive producer
- Jimmy Jam – multi-instruments, producer, executive producer
- Seb Janiak – video director
- John Kennedy – violin
- Kathy Kienzle – harp
- Joshua Koestenbaum – cello
- Tom Kornacker – violin
- Kim Kyu Young – violin
- Terry Lewis – multi-instruments, producer, executive producer
- David Mallet – video director
- Andrew McPherson – photography
- Dave Meyers – video director
- Karen Mitchell – make-up assistant
- James C. Moore – producer
- Adrian Morgan – producer
- Elsa Nilsson – violin
- Julia Persitz – violin
- Alice Preves – viola
- Q-Tip – rap
- Jason Rankins – assistant engineer
- Alexander Richbourg – drum programming, MIDI programming, Pro-Tools
- David Rideau – engineer, mixing
- Rockwilder – producer, drum programming, MIDI programming
- Matthew Rolston – video director
- Mike Scott – guitar
- Dominic Sena – video director
- Chris Seul – engineer
- Laura Sewell – cello
- Dexter Simmons – mixing
- Carly Simon – performer
- Daryl Skobba – cello
- Xavier Smith – drum programming, assistant engineer, mixing, MIDI programming
- Smog – design
- Michal Sobieski – violin
- Tamas Strasser – viola
- Tom Sweeney – assistant engineer, mixing
- James "Big Jim" Wright – keyboards
- Bradley Yost – assistant engineer, mixing
- Janet Zeitoun – hair stylist

== Charts ==
=== Weekly charts ===
Chart (2001)	Peak position
Australian Albums (ARIA)	3
Australian Urban Albums (ARIA)	2
Austrian Albums (Ö3 Austria)	8
Belgian Albums (Ultratop Flanders)	3
Belgian Albums (Ultratop Wallonia)	3
Canadian Albums (Billboard)	1
Canadian R&B Albums (SoundScan)	1
Danish Albums (Hitlisten)	21
Dutch Albums (Album Top 100)	4
European Top 100 Albums (Billboard)	2
Finnish Albums (Suomen virallinen lista)	14
French Albums (SNEP)	2
German Albums (Offizielle Top 100)	3
Greek Albums (IFPI)	3
Hungarian Albums (MAHASZ)	7
Irish Albums (IRMA)	16
Italian Albums (FIMI)	10
Japanese Albums (Oricon)	4
New Zealand Albums (RMNZ)	6
Norwegian Albums (VG-lista)	4
Polish Albums (ZPAV)	21
Scottish Albums (Official Charts)	10
Spanish Albums (PROMUSICAE)	9
Swedish Albums (Sverigetopplistan)	4
Swiss Albums (Schweizer Hitparade)	2
UK Albums (Official Charts)	2
UK R&B Albums (Official Charts)	1
US Billboard 200	1
US Top R&B/Hip-Hop Albums (Billboard)	1

Chart (2014–2016)	Peak position
South African Albums (RISA)	1
South Korean Albums (Gaon)	39

=== Monthly charts ===
Chart (2001)	Peak position
South Korean Albums (RIAK)	3

=== Year-end charts ===
Chart (2001)	Position
Australian Albums (ARIA)	75
Australian Urban Albums (ARIA)	11
Belgian Albums (Ultratop Flanders)	81
Belgian Albums (Ultratop Wallonia)	82
Canadian Albums (SoundScan)	27
Canadian R&B Albums (SoundScan)	8
European Top 100 Albums (Billboard)	70
French Albums (SNEP)	79
German Albums (Offizielle Top 100)	78
Italian Albums (Musica e Dischi)	97
Japanese Albums (Oricon)	48
Norwegian Russetid Albums (VG-lista)	15
Swiss Albums (Schweizer Hitparade)	70
UK Albums (OCC)	98
US Billboard 200	25
US Top R&B/Hip-Hop Albums (Billboard)	17
Worldwide Albums (IFPI)	11

Chart (2002)	Position
Canadian R&B Albums (SoundScan)	70
US Billboard 200	174
US Top R&B/Hip-Hop Albums (Billboard)	96

=== Decade-end charts ===
Chart (2000–2009)	Position
US Billboard 200	141

== Certifications and sales ==
Region	Certification	Certified units/sales
Australia (ARIA)	Gold	35,000^{^}
Belgium (BRMA)	Gold	25,000^{*}
Canada (Music Canada)	3× Platinum	300,000^{^}
Denmark (IFPI Danmark)	Gold	25,000^{^}
France (SNEP)	Gold	100,000^{*}
Germany (BVMI)	Gold	150,000^{^}
Japan (RIAJ)	3× Platinum	600,000^{^}
New Zealand (RMNZ)	Gold	7,500^{^}
Spain (Promusicae)	Gold	50,000^{^}
South Africa (RISA)	4× Platinum	200,000^{*}
South Korea (RIAK)	—	28,171
Switzerland (IFPI Switzerland)	Gold	20,000^{^}
United Kingdom (BPI)	Gold	198,000
United States (RIAA)	2× Platinum	3,107,000
^{*} Sales figures based on certification alone.^{^} Shipments figures based on certification alone.

== Release history ==
Region	Date	Edition(s)	Format(s)	Label(s)	Ref.
Japan	April 16, 2001	Standard	CD; LP	EMI Music Japan	
Germany	April 20, 2001	Standard	CD; LP	EMI	
Australia	April 23, 2001	Standard	CD; LP	EMI Music Australia	
United Kingdom	April 23, 2001	Standard	CD; LP	Virgin	
United States	April 24, 2001	Standard	CD; LP	Virgin	
United States	July 17, 2001	Clean (Walmart exclusive)	CD; LP	Virgin	
United States	November 20, 2001	Clean; reissue	CD; LP	Virgin	
United States	November 20, 2001	Limited	CD+DVD	Virgin	
Japan	December 6, 2001	Limited	CD+DVD	EMI	
Various	July 26, 2019	Limited	LP; Picture disc	Virgin; UM^{e}; JDJ	

== See also ==
- List of Billboard 200 number-one albums of 2001
- List of Billboard number-one R&B albums of 2001
- List of number-one albums of 2001 (Canada)
