= All for You Tour =

2001–02 concert tour by Janet Jackson

- Tour by Janet Jackson
- Tour Program Book cover
- Associated album: All for You
- Start date: July 7, 2001
- End date: February 16, 2002
- Legs: 3
- No. of shows: 73
- Box office: US$48.1 million ($86.1 million in 2025 dollars)

Janet Jackson concert chronology
- The Velvet Rope Tour (1998–99); All for You Tour (2001–02); Rock Witchu Tour (2008)

The All for You Tour was the fourth concert tour by American recording artist Janet Jackson, in support of her seventh studio album All for You (2001). The show was designed by Mark Fisher and Jackson. Visiting Asia and North America, the tour was originally scheduled to start in Vancouver, Canada, but due to problems transporting technical equipment across the Canada–United States border. A European leg, taking place in late 2001, was cancelled following the September 11 attacks. Consisting of 73 dates, the All for You Tour commenced in Portland, Oregon, on July 7, 2001 and ended in Honolulu, Hawaii, on February 16, 2002.

The tour received a positive reception from both audiences and critics, praising the choreography, theatrics, and upbeat nature. It was notable for the highly controversial rendition of "Would You Mind", where Jackson selected a member of the audience and strapped them into a gurney while caressing and fondling them.

According to Pollstar, the tour was the 8th highest grossing Year-End Tour of 2001, grossing $42 million from 57 shows and grossed over $48 million from 68 shows in North America between 2001 and 2002. The final show was broadcast live on HBO as Janet: Live in Hawaii.

== Postponements and cancellations ==
The first scheduled show of the tour, at Vancouver, British Columbia's GM Place, was indefinitely postponed (and ultimately cancelled) when an integral piece of the stage set did not arrive on-time for prior rehearsals and the planned tour schedule. According to a statement released by Orca Bay and SFX Concerts, the shipping problems were blamed on the Canada Day and American Independence Day holidays, on July 1 and 4, respectively; Jackson and her entourage had been rehearsing in Vancouver for about a week prior to the start of the tour. Officially, the tour began anew in Portland, Oregon on July 7, 2001. The Edmonton, Alberta show was also cancelled because of the aforementioned delivery issues. That same month, a show in Milwaukee, Wisconsin was rescheduled after Jackson chipped a tooth during rehearsals and had to undergo a root canal. In early August 2001, Jackson then came-down with the flu, which forced the postponement of shows in Cleveland, Indianapolis, and Pittsburgh. A show at New York's Madison Square Garden which was scheduled for August 21, 2001, was moved to the day before due to scheduling conflicts with the WNBA playoffs. She also rescheduled two concerts in Philadelphia and Charlotte in late August 2001, due to a recurring respiratory problem. The singer also canceled a scheduled show in Birmingham, Alabama.

Jackson was scheduled to perform a concert in Tampa, Florida on September 11, 2001. However, that night's show was postponed and rescheduled after the attacks happening on that day. The following two shows in Ft. Lauderdale were also rescheduled due to the tragedies. However, the tour resumed—with heightened security measures—five days later, on September 16, in New Orleans, Louisiana. On October 1, 2001, the entire European leg of the tour was canceled, citing travel concerns for Jackson’s entourage following the September 11th attacks. Jackson said in a statement: "My European fans are among the most loyal[,] and I was very excited to share this show with them. I have agonized over this decision. Like most people, the events of Sept. 11 have troubled me enormously[,] and I remain concerned about the foreseeable future. If anything happened to anyone on this tour, I could never forgive myself." The singer was due to play 24 dates across Europe, beginning on 31 October 2001 in Stockholm, Sweden and ending nearly two months later, on 17 December 2001, in Birmingham, England. Additionally, Jackson's planned performance and appearance on the MTV Europe Music Awards 2001, filmed that year on 8 November in Frankfurt, Germany, was also cancelled, a spokesperson affirming: "She [Jackson] won't be coming to Europe at all [this year]". The singer had later considered another European tour the following year, in 2002, although it did not ultimately come to fruition.

== Critical reception ==
Reviewing the tour's premiere concert at the Rose Garden Arena, Jennifer Van Evra of The Vancouver Sun reported that "the Janet Jackson that crowds are catching on this tour is distinctly different from the one they might have seen in years past. Gone is the 'girl next door' version of Janet—the coy, cutesy, smiling little girl who managed to avoid the glare of the tabloids. Now 35, recently divorced, and with her new album 'All For You' in tow, Jackson is showing off a much sassier, sexier, more confident self." Pop music critic Kevin C. Johnson of the St. Louis Post-Dispatch gave a mixed review, believing the concert had similarities to her prior tour. However, he remarked: "Jackson remains one of this generation's most exciting performers in concert, easily triumphing over the likes of young upstarts Britney Spears, Christina Aguilera and Destiny's Child." Buffalo News critic Craig Seymour praised Jackson's concert at the HSBC Arena, stating that "her 'All for You' tour marked another milestone for the veteran artist, who proved to be more comfortable with own ability to command an audience than ever before." According to Seymour the best segment of the night was the "Asian-influenced set for the still-rousing 'Rhythm Nation'." He adds, "She doesn't fight against her image like Madonna, who plays almost none of her early hits during this summer's 'Drowned World' tour. Rather, she attacks her classics with such vigor that the experience is less nostalgic than vitally in-the-moment. But most of all, by embracing her well-liked hits, Jackson does precisely what a superstar is supposed to do: She lets the crowd love her."

Jim Farber of the New York Daily News wrote: "In the splashy two-hour event, which made its New York bow at Madison Square Garden last night, the suspiciously sculpted star ripped through nine costume changes, gyrated around a host of ever-changing stage sets and offered no fewer than 26 songs plucked from more than a decade's worth of hits." He criticized similarities to her previous tour, saying: "Unfortunately, the evening also recycled some Janet stunts from the past. A segment that centered on frothy cartoon characters (with Jackson appearing as a sugar plum fairy) mimicked her 1998 tour's equally infantile circus fantasia. An S&M segment, in which she strapped an audience member to a gurney and straddled him, also repeated a similar NC-17 episode from the last go-round." Sonia Murry of The Atlanta Journal-Constitution offered a positive review of Jackson's performance at the Philips Arena in comparison to other artists who were also touring at the time. She comments that while "'N Sync had some sharp moves on occasion, it was as if Jackson was plugged in she moved so much, and so well ... While Madonna offered a true visual feast, the 19,000-plus seemed to be satiated with just the art that was Jackson's sculptured body ... And where Sade may offer instant intimacy with one well-placed and throaty high note, well, Jackson did fine just to flex her thin pipes on 'Again', part of her medley of ballads ('Come Back to Me', and 'Let's Wait Awhile' included)."

Los Angeles Times pop music critic David Massey also praised Jackson's concert favorably in contrast, reporting "Madonna even in her prime was unable to move at the fast and crisp pace of Jackson. ... From the T-shirts to the tour book to the concert itself, Janet outdid the Material Girl by a mile." Massey added, "Eric Clapton sits with a guitar, year after year. Elton John sits at a piano year after year. No one presses them to dramatically alter the type of show they put on. Janet is a dance artist, and to expect something different at a Janet show is outright insane." Jackson's concert was also observed as a direct influence to Britney Spears, saying "Not only is Janet emulated by the type of show she puts on by the current teen-fab (that she made popular years ago), she still does it better than the 19-year-olds." Robert Hilburn reported that "Jackson's 'All for You' concert is tightly scripted and executed with the precision of a Broadway show—complete with flashy sets, video footage (including a probably inadvertent glimpse of the World Trade Center in one), eight dancers and even more costume changes." Los Angeles Daily News critic Sandra Barrera observed "[a]lthough her latest album, 'All for You' fueled the concert, Jackson embraced her past. As the video for 'Let's Wait Awhile' played on a giant screen, revealing a plumper Jackson falling in love amid the New York skyline, wild cheers came from the audience. She flashed back to her Marilyn Monroe-esque phase for 'Love Will Never Do', and vamped with grotesque creatures for 'Trust A Try'. She performed a medley of 'What Have You Done For Me Lately', 'Control' and 'Nasty'. And she sang 'Miss You Much', 'When I Think of You' and 'Escapade' while dressed as a whimsical insect in a "Bug's Life" sort of fantasy land."

Neva Chonin of the San Francisco Chronicle gave a positive review, stating that Jackson has been performing "for more than 28 years, but she's not slowing down. On the contrary, Jackson's tour supporting her sultry album 'All for You' is a whirling extravaganza of ever-transforming stage sets, amped-up dancing and music strong enough to rise above the furor. There are other attractions, too, such as Jackson donning dominatrix drag to simulate rites of masochistic love with a lucky audience member while singing 'Would You Mind', whose lyrics alone could make the coldest fish sweat. Have we mentioned her fabulous voice? She has a fabulous voice." Gina Vivinetto of the St. Petersburg Times, who reviewed Jackson's concert at the Ice Palace, compared it favorably to Madonna's, as "both megastars have taken wildly different paths." She comments that Madonna's "lengthy show contained precious few hits. Madonna was out to share her most recent artistic vision, whether or not you liked it" and in contrast, Jackson "sweats and shimmies and dishes out every hit she's had over a 15-year career that's bursting with them. Jackson even bunches several together in medleys so you don't go home feeling cheated." Jodi Duckett of The Morning Call stated "the reigning star of the first family of pop kept the sold-out crowd at the First Union Center on their feet for two hours while she sang, danced, vamped, acted and posed, supported by eight dancers and a five-member band, a wardrobe that clung to every nook of her chiseled body and a fluid stage set."

== Recordings and broadcasts ==
The first three songs of the premiere concert in Portland were broadcast live on VH1 as Janet Jackson: Opening Night Live. Along with live reporting from the venue, the broadcast featured clips of Jackson's "Greatest Television Moments". Her performance of "All for You" in Charlotte was broadcast on her brother Michael Jackson's United We Stand: What More Can I Give benefit concert on October 21, 2001. The February 16, 2002 concert in Honolulu aired on HBO the following night. It was directed by David Mallet. HBO's senior vice president of original programming Nancy Geller stated, "Janet Jackson is one of today's premier entertainers, and a favorite of our subscribers. Her spectacular show continues HBO's tradition of presenting the biggest and best music". This was Jackson's second HBO concert special; the first being the broadcast of The Velvet Rope Tour. The program also featured never-before-seen footage of Jackson in her dressing room while changing into her costumes during the show. One day prior to the concert, the singer held a dress rehearsal and invited many fans who were waiting outside of the stadium inside. The dress rehearsal was also filmed, with parts being edited into the televised program. Missy Elliott also made a surprise appearance at the televised concert in Honolulu to perform during "Son of a Gun (I Betcha Think This Song Is About You)". The broadcast was watched by more than twelve million viewers, and was later released on DVD and VHS, titled Janet: Live in Hawaii.

== Set list ==
The following set list was used for the performance in Portland, Oregon. It does not represent all concerts for the duration of the tour.

1. "Come On Get Up"
2. "You Ain't Right"
3. "All for You"
4. "Love Will Never Do (Without You)"
5. "Trust a Try"
6. "Come Back to Me" / "Let's Wait Awhile" / "Again"
7. "Runaway" / "Miss You Much" / "When I Think of You" / "Escapade"
8. "Son of a Gun (I Betcha Think This Song Is About You)"
9. "Got 'til It's Gone" / "That's the Way Love Goes"
10. "What Have You Done for Me Lately" / "Control" / "Nasty" (contains elements of "I Just Wanna Love U (Give It 2 Me)")
11. "Alright"
12. "Love Scene (Ooh Baby)" (Instrumental Interlude)
13. "Would You Mind"
14. "If"
15. "Black Cat"
16. "Rhythm Nation" (contains excerpts from "The Knowledge")
17. "Doesn't Really Matter"
18. "Someone to Call My Lover"
19. "Together Again"

Notes

- Missy Elliott joined Jackson onstage to perform "Son of a Gun (I Betcha Think This Song Is About You)" during the final concert in Honolulu.

== Tour dates ==
List of 2001 concerts
Date (2001)	City	Country	Venue	Supporting acts	Attendance	Revenue
July 7	Portland	United States	Rose Garden	112	10,594 / 12,330	$642,196
July 8	Seattle	United States	KeyArena	112	11,097 / 12,000	$692,073
July 9 (Note: The July 9, 2001, concert in Vancouver was originally planned to take place on July 5, 2001, but was postponed due to a piece of stage equipment not arriving on time.)	Vancouver	Canada	General Motors Place	112	12,123 / 16,986	$690,850
July 11	Calgary	Canada	Pengrowth Saddledome	112	12,625 / 13,185	$713,717
July 14	Kansas City	United States	Kemper Arena	112	12,439 / 13,974	$770,614
July 15	St. Louis	United States	Savvis Center	112	10,161 / 13,574	$534,815
July 17	Minneapolis	United States	Target Center	112	12,319 / 12,959	$756,324
July 21	Columbus	United States	Nationwide Arena	112	11,734 / 13,663	$785,591
July 22	Lexington	United States	Rupp Arena	112	10,673 / 10,890	$483,105
July 24	Moline	United States	The MARK of the Quad Cities	112	9,326 / 10,408	$587,395
July 26	Chicago	United States	United Center	112	31,795 / 42,219	$2,513,063
July 27	Chicago	United States	United Center	112	31,795 / 42,219	$2,513,063
July 28	Chicago	United States	United Center	112	31,795 / 42,219	$2,513,063
July 30	Auburn Hills	United States	The Palace of Auburn Hills	112	27,604 / 32,002	$1,768,638
July 31	Auburn Hills	United States	The Palace of Auburn Hills	112	27,604 / 32,002	$1,768,638
August 2	Toronto	Canada	Air Canada Centre	112	14,112 / 15,967	$880,208
August 3	Montreal	Canada	Molson Centre	112	9,261 / 10,160	$534,683
August 10	Buffalo	United States	HSBC Arena	112	10,124 / 15,250	$524,381
August 11	Hartford	United States	Hartford Civic Center	112	11,343 / 14,279	$726,558
August 16	Washington, D.C.	United States	MCI Center	112	39,010 / 43,557	$2,546,847
August 17	Washington, D.C.	United States	MCI Center	112	39,010 / 43,557	$2,546,847
August 18	Washington, D.C.	United States	MCI Center	112	39,010 / 43,557	$2,546,847
August 20 (Note: The August 20, 2001, concert in New York was originally planned to take place on August 21, 2001, but was rescheduled due to WNBA playoffs.)	New York City	United States	Madison Square Garden	112	38,743 / 42,492	$3,175,670
August 22	New York City	United States	Madison Square Garden	112	38,743 / 42,492	$3,175,670
August 23	New York City	United States	Madison Square Garden	112	38,743 / 42,492	$3,175,670
August 25	Boston	United States	FleetCenter	112	26,892 / 26,892	$1,884,176
August 26	Boston	United States	FleetCenter	112	26,892 / 26,892	$1,884,176
September 3 (Note: The September 3, 2001, concert in Cleveland was originally planned to take place on August 5, 2001, but was postponed due to flu.)	Cleveland	United States	Gund Arena	112	9,537 / 15,751	$641,612
September 5	Raleigh	United States	Raleigh Entertainment & Sports Arena	112	—N/a	—N/a
September 7	Nashville	United States	Gaylord Entertainment Center	112	9,227 / 11,686	$610,786
September 8	Atlanta	United States	Philips Arena	112	14,681 / 15,584	$852,683
September 9	Greensboro	United States	Greensboro Coliseum	112	10,856 / 13,368	$491,226
September 16	New Orleans	United States	New Orleans Arena	112	8,675 / 10,372	$564,038
September 18	Houston	United States	Compaq Center	112	10,166 / 10,827	$701,808
September 19	San Antonio	United States	Alamodome	112	12,890 / 16,823	$574,019
September 21	North Little Rock	United States	Alltel Arena	112	11,456 / 13,000	$569,166
September 22	Dallas	United States	American Airlines Center	112	12,325 / 12,722	$791,688
September 26	San Diego	United States	San Diego Sports Arena	112	10,131 / 14,383	$661,902
September 27	Phoenix	United States	America West Arena	112	12,417 / 12,956	$809,018
September 29	Anaheim	United States	Arrowhead Pond of Anaheim	112	11,124 / 12,001	$788,111
September 30	Sacramento	United States	ARCO Arena	112	10,022 / 11,526	$663,432
October 2	Los Angeles	United States	Staples Center	112	26,883 / 28,183	$1,998,752
October 3	Los Angeles	United States	Staples Center	112	26,883 / 28,183	$1,998,752
October 5	Las Vegas	United States	MGM Grand Garden Arena	112	—N/a	—N/a
October 6	Las Vegas	United States	MGM Grand Garden Arena	112	—N/a	—N/a
October 8	San Jose	United States	Compaq Center	112	25,819 / 27,817 (Note: The score data is combined from the shows held at the Compaq Center on October 8 and 10, 2001.)	$1,832,508
October 9	Oakland	United States	The Arena in Oakland	112	13,217 / 14,118	$935,434
October 10	San Jose	United States	Compaq Center	112		
October 12	Salt Lake City	United States	Delta Center	112	9,701 / 12,698	$590,068
October 13	Denver	United States	Pepsi Center	112	13,284 / 18,487	$857,118
October 16 (Note: The October 16, 2001, concert in Milwaukee was originally planned to take place on July 18, 2001, but was postponed due to a chipped tooth.)	Milwaukee	United States	Bradley Center	112	10,948 / 14,470	$449,079
October 18 (Note: The October 18, 2001, concert in Indianapolis was originally planned to take place on August 7, 2001, but was postponed due to flu.)	Indianapolis	United States	Conseco Fieldhouse	112	10,707 / 14,420	$592,650
October 20 (Note: The October 20, 2001, concert in Pittsburgh was originally planned to take place on August 8, 2001, but was postponed due to flu.)	Pittsburgh	United States	Mellon Arena	112	10,041 / 13,052	$522,386
October 21 (Note: The October 21, 2001, concert in Charlotte was originally planned to take place on August 29, 2001, but was postponed due to relapse of the flu.)	Charlotte	United States	Charlotte Coliseum	112	10,929 / 14,549	$480,831
October 23 (Note: The October 23, 2001, concert in Philadelphia was originally planned to take place on August 28, 2001, but was postponed due to relapse of the flu.)	Philadelphia	United States	First Union Center	112	13,220 / 14,125	$948,633
October 26 (Note: The October 26, 2001, concert in Tampa was originally planned to take place on September 11, 2001, but was postponed due the September 11 attacks.)	Tampa	United States	Ice Palace	112	11,400 / 14,215	$811,465
October 28 (Note: The October 28, 2001, concert in Sunrise was originally planned to take place on September 13, 2001, but was postponed due to the September 11 attacks.)	Sunrise	United States	National Car Rental Center	112	23,073 / 26,623	$1,280,001
October 29 (Note: The October 29, 2001, concert in Sunrise was originally planned to take place on September 14, 2001, but was postponed due to the September 11 attacks.)	Sunrise	United States	National Car Rental Center	112	23,073 / 26,623	$1,280,001

List of 2002 concerts
Date (2002)	City	Country	Venue	Supporting acts	Attendance	Revenue
January 12	Osaka	Japan	Osaka Dome	—N/a	—N/a	—N/a
January 13	Osaka	Japan	Osaka Dome	—N/a	—N/a	—N/a
January 17	Tokyo	Japan	Tokyo Dome	—N/a	—N/a	—N/a
January 18	Tokyo	Japan	Tokyo Dome	—N/a	—N/a	—N/a
January 25	Louisville	United States	Freedom Hall	Ginuwine	11,891 / 14,934	$468,463
January 26	Champaign	United States	Assembly Hall	Ginuwine	9,050 / 10,025	$408,518
January 29	Hamilton	Canada	Copps Coliseum	Ginuwine	8,868 / 10,311	$438,027
January 30	Grand Rapids	United States	Van Andel Arena	Ginuwine	9,474 / 10,722	$602,547
February 1	University Park	United States	Bryce Jordan Center	Ginuwine	8,199 / 10,913	$377,212
February 2	Atlantic City	United States	Etess Arena	Ginuwine	—N/a	—N/a
February 5	Uncasville	United States	Mohegan Sun Arena	Ginuwine	—N/a	—N/a
February 6	Uniondale	United States	Nassau Veterans Memorial Coliseum	Ginuwine	9,326 / 10,408	$587,395
February 8	Wilkes-Barre	United States	First Union Arena	Ginuwine	7,101 / 7,101	$422,796
February 9	Hampton	United States	Hampton Coliseum	Ginuwine	8,847 / 8,934	$428,779
February 16	Honolulu	United States	Aloha Stadium	Ginuwine	31,964 / 33,505	$1,472,935
Total					751,621 / 874,511 (86%)	$44,702,303

== Cancelled dates ==
List of cancelled concerts
Date (2001)	City	Country	Venue	Reason
July 10	Edmonton	Canada	Skyreach Centre	Stage delivery delays
August 30	Birmingham	United States	BJCC Arena	Flu
October 31	Stockholm	Sweden	Stockholm Globe Arena	September 11 attacks
November 2	Helsinki	Finland	Hartwall Areena	September 11 attacks
November 5	Oslo	Norway	Oslo Spektrum	September 11 attacks
November 6	Copenhagen	Denmark	Parken Stadium	September 11 attacks
November 11	Berlin	Germany	Velodrom	September 11 attacks
November 12	Hannover	Germany	Preussag Arena	September 11 attacks
November 14	Frankfurt	Germany	Festhalle Frankfurt	September 11 attacks
November 15	Leipzig	Germany	Arena Leipzig	September 11 attacks
November 17	Zürich	Switzerland	Hallenstadion	September 11 attacks
November 18	Vienna	Austria	Wiener Stadthalle	September 11 attacks
November 19	Cologne	Germany	Kölnarena	September 11 attacks
November 20	Oberhausen	Germany	König Pilsener Arena	September 11 attacks
November 22	Munich	Germany	Olympiahalle	September 11 attacks
November 26	Paris	France	Palais Omnisports de Paris-Bercy	September 11 attacks
November 29	Antwerp	Belgium	Sportpaleis	September 11 attacks
December 1	Arnhem	Netherlands	GelreDome	September 11 attacks
December 3	Stuttgart	Germany	Hanns-Martin-Schleyer-Halle	September 11 attacks
December 5	Manchester	United Kingdom	Manchester Evening News Arena	September 11 attacks
December 6	Newcastle	United Kingdom	Telewest Arena	September 11 attacks
December 8	Sheffield	United Kingdom	Sheffield Arena	September 11 attacks
December 11	London	United Kingdom	Earls Court Exhibition Centre	September 11 attacks
December 12	London	United Kingdom	Earls Court Exhibition Centre	September 11 attacks
December 14	Belfast	United Kingdom	Odyssey Arena	September 11 attacks
December 17	Birmingham	United Kingdom	NEC Arena	September 11 attacks

== Personnel ==
=== The band ===
- Musical director: David Barry
- Drums: Brian Frasier-Moore
- Keyboards: Joel Campbell and Morris Pleasure
- Guitar: David Barry
- Bass: Ethan Farmer
- Background vocals: Julie Delgado, Jenny Douglas-McCrae, Stacey Campbell (select shows)

=== The dancers ===
- Shawnette Heard (main choreographer)
- Gil Duldulao, Jr. (associate choreographer)
- Eddie Morales (associate choreographer)
- Kelly Konno (assistant choreographer)
- Jenna Dewan
- Alison Faulk
- David Walton
- Nicholas Florez
- Laurie Sposit (swing dancer)
- Kevin Wilson
- Luis Sanchez
- Marcel Wilson (swing dancer)

=== Production ===
- Set designed by Mark Fisher, Janet Jackson, Shawnette Heard
- Lighting designed by Abby Rosen Holmes
- Video Content Designed by Mindpool Live
