= Someone to Call My Lover =

2001 single by Janet Jackson

Single by Janet Jackson

from the album All for You
- Released: June 12, 2001
- Studio: Flyte Tyme (Edina, Minnesota)
- Genre: Pop
- Length: 4:32 (album version); 4:15 (single edit)
- Label: Virgin
- Songwriters: Janet Jackson; James Harris III; Terry Lewis; Dewey Bunnell
- Producers: Janet Jackson; Jimmy Jam and Terry Lewis

Janet Jackson singles chronology
"All for You" (2001)	"Someone to Call My Lover" (2001)	"Son of a Gun (I Betcha Think This Song Is About You)" (2001)

Music video
- "Someone to Call My Lover" on YouTube

"Someone to Call My Lover" is a song by American singer-songwriter Janet Jackson from her seventh studio album, All for You (2001). Written and produced by Jackson and Jimmy Jam and Terry Lewis, the song was released as the album's second single on June 12, 2001, by Virgin Records. Using a guitar riff from America's "Ventura Highway" and the melody from Erik Satie's "Gymnopédie No. 1", "Someone to Call My Lover" talks about being determined to find a perfect match.

"Someone to Call My Lover" received positive reviews from critics, with most praising its innocence and sweet aura, picking the song as a standout track on the album. The song was a success on the charts, reaching number three on the US Billboard Hot 100 while peaking at number nine in Canada and the top twenty in Australia, New Zealand and the United Kingdom. A music video was directed by Francis Lawrence and centers on a jukebox. Another video for the So So Def remix was also released. Jackson has performed the song on three of her tours, most recently on her 2024 Together Again Tour. In 2025, the song saw a spike in online popularity following a viral trend on TikTok, happening again in 2026 due to an internet meme.

== Background and writing ==
"Someone to Call My Lover" was written and produced by Janet Jackson, James Harris III and Terry Lewis. The song's looped guitar riff is sampled from America's 1972 hit "Ventura Highway", with Dewey Bunnell receiving writing credits. The loop played throughout the chorus is an interpolation of "Gymnopédie No. 1" by French classical composer Erik Satie, played in 4/4 time instead of the original 3/4. Jackson had searched for years for the Satie track after hearing it on television as a child.

When I was a little girl and I used to come home from school, there was something called "The 3:30 Movie", and they used to play the MGM Musicals. There was a commercial. I remember watching Singin' in the Rain and there was a commercial with the lady all in white, and I don't know if it was for Dove or something like that, but they would play this, 'Da, da, da.' It was the Erik Satie. I never knew who the composer was, and this song never left me.

Jackson said she came across the tune again about seven years later: "I was at Ralph Lauren and I said, 'Oh, my God! Is this the radio or is this a CD?' I said, 'Please tell me it's a CD.' They said, 'It's a CD—well, actually it's a Ralph Lauren CD and we don't have it anymore. I was like, 'Oh God...no,' and they gave me the CD." Jackson said, "I took it straight to Jimmy [Jam] and said, 'Jimmy, I've just got to share this with you,' and he saw my passion and my love for it. He didn't take the actual song, but he kind of put his own flavor to it in 'Someone to Call My Lover,' which takes me back to my childhood." In an interview, Jimmy said, "And for 'Someone to Call My Lover,' she hadn't heard the 'Ventura Highway' sample before. She hadn't heard those songs. So it's kind of fun to come up with stuff like that and play it for her. And she hasn't heard of it, but she still really likes it. So you have something that's going to appeal to people that haven't heard it before, it's going to catch them, but it's also going to catch the people who are nostalgic about it."

== Composition and music ==
At the time of recording, Jackson was in a divorce battle with her husband, René Elizondo, Jr., after nearly ten years of marriage. "Someone to Call My Lover", and several of the other songs on All for You, use Jackson's divorce and re-emergence into single life as central themes. "Someone to Call My Lover" talks about being determined to find a perfect match. Dave Barry replays America's "Ventura Highway" main guitar hook, as an interpolation and serves as the opening to the single, accompanied by finger snaps and bass. In the beginning, Jackson has begun touring again and there isn't anyone to talk to and she wishes she had companionship, "Back on the road again/Feeling kinda lonely/And looking for the right guy/To be mine," she sings.

In the pre-chorus, she fantasizes where her dream guy might be, "Maybe we'll meet at a bar / He'll drive a funky car / Maybe we'll meet at a club / And fall so deeply in love," she sings. In the chorus, she's eager to find a guy to love, "Alright, maybe gonna find him today / I gotta get someone to call my lover / Yeah, baby, come on," she chants.

"Someone to Call My Lover" is written in the key of D major with a moderately fast tempo of 128 beats per minute. The song follows a chord progression of D^{maj7}–G^{6}–D^{maj7}–G^{6}, and Jackson's vocals span from the low note A_{3} to the high note B_{4}.

== Critical reception ==
"Someone to Call My Lover" received generally favorable reviews from music critics. Stephen Thomas Erlewine from AllMusic picked the song as "one of the record's best cuts". Timothy Park of NME enjoyed the lyrics, writing that "while most of us dream of being Janet, it's reassuring to know she dreams of being us. And providing she does it with the ever-enduring Jam & Lewis produced fluffy pop of 'Someone To Call My Lover' then who are we to complain?." In another NME review, Piers Martin wrote that the song "recalls Aaliyah's 'Try Again' in its squelchy simplicity." Gene Stout of Seattle Post-Intelligencer praised the track, calling it "sweetly innocent", praising the "Ventura Highway guitar," and writing that it "adds a wistful, nostalgic feel to the song's deep yearnings for love and togetherness."

According to Chuck Arnold from Entertainment Weekly, "Although she has yet to find someone to call her lover, the mood is irrepressibly upbeat and optimistic about pre-Tinder match-meeting".

== Chart performance ==
The song was released as the second single from All for You, following the huge success of its title track. It is the last of Jackson's singles to have reached the top 10 on the Billboard Hot 100 chart to date. On the Billboard Hot 100 chart, "Someone to Call My Lover" reached the top 40 in June. It eventually peaked at number three the issue dated September 1, 2001, becoming Jackson's 27th and last top-10 hit. The song reached number nine on Nielsen Soundscan's Canadian chart. "Someone to Call My Lover" reached the top 20 in many places. In the United Kingdom, the song reached number 11 on the UK Singles Chart In Australia, the song debuted and peaked at number 15 on the ARIA Singles Chart week of August 5, 2001, spending nine weeks on the chart, while on the New Zealand Singles Chart, the song debuted at number 30 and peaked at number 18 in its fourth week, spending a total of 15 weeks on the chart.

=== Remixes and accolades ===
For the single, a So So Def Remix was produced and became Jackson's first collaboration with Jermaine Dupri. The song earned Jackson a Grammy Award nomination for Best Female Pop Vocal Performance at the 44th Annual Grammy Awards in 2002, losing out to Nelly Furtado's "I'm Like a Bird".

== Music video ==
The music video was directed by Francis Lawrence on Spahn Ranch in Los Angeles, California in May 2001. It premiered on MTV's Total Request Live on June 20, 2001. It centres on a jukebox. Jackson is depicted driving and walking into a bar, where she sings, dances and eventually hitches a ride from a red car. A video for the So So Def Remix was also released, and contains similar footage to the original but contains shots of Dupri in alternate scenes as well as his vocals. The original video made the limited bonus-DVD edition of All for You while the So So Def Remix video appears on the 2004 video compilation From Janet to Damita Jo: The Videos.

== Live performances ==
Jackson has performed "Someone to Call My Lover" on two of her tours. The song was added to the setlist of her All for You Tour, as one of the last songs on the show. During the performance, the singer wore a white T-shirt and jeans, along with a lei in Hawaii. The February 16, 2002, final date of the tour at the Aloha Stadium in Hawaii, was broadcast by HBO. This rendition was also added to the setlist at its DVD release, Janet: Live in Hawaii, in 2002. "Someone to Call My Lover" was also the video dedication song to Singapore for the 2011 Number Ones, Up Close and Personal tour. It was also performed on her 2017 State of the World Tour in place of "Island Life" at several shows, including in Cleveland on December 3, and Memphis on December 6. Jackson performed the song on the second leg of her 2023-2024 Janet Jackson: Together Again tour. She also performed the song in a medley along with "All For You" during the 2025 American Music Awards.

== Track listings ==
US CD single

1. "Someone to Call My Lover" (So So Def remix) – 4:40
2. "Someone to Call My Lover" (single edit) – 4:14

US 12-inch single

A1. "Someone to Call My Lover" (So So Def remix) – 4:40
A2. "Someone to Call My Lover" (Hex Hector/Mac Quayle radio mix) – 3:49
B1. "Someone to Call My Lover" (album version)

UK CD single

1. "Someone to Call My Lover" (single edit) – 4:14
2. "Someone to Call My Lover" (Hex Hector/Mac Quayle club mix) – 7:48
3. "Someone to Call My Lover" (So So Def remix) – 4:40
4. "Someone to Call My Lover" (video)

UK 12-inch single

A1. "Someone to Call My Lover" (Hex Hector/Mac Quayle club mix) – 7:48
B1. "Someone to Call My Lover" (So So Def remix) – 4:40
B2. "Someone to Call My Lover" (The Velvet mix) – 4:46

UK cassette single

1. "Someone to Call My Lover" (single edit) – 4:14
2. "Someone to Call My Lover" (Hex Hector/Mac Quayle club mix) – 7:48
3. "Someone to Call My Lover" (So So Def remix) – 4:40

European CD single

1. "Someone to Call My Lover" (single edit) – 4:14
2. "Someone to Call My Lover" (So So Def remix) – 4:40

Australasian and Japanese CD single

1. "Someone to Call My Lover" (single edit) – 4:14
2. "Someone to Call My Lover" (Hex Hector/Mac Quayle radio edit) – 3:49
3. "Someone to Call My Lover" (So So Def remix) – 4:40
4. "Someone to Call My Lover" (Velvet mix) – 4:46
5. "Someone to Call My Lover" (Hex Hector/Mac Quayle club mix) – 7:48

== Credits and personnel ==
Credits are lifted from the All for You album booklet.

Studios

- Recorded and mixed at Flyte Tyme Studios (Edina, Minnesota)
- Mastered at Bernie Grundman Mastering (Hollywood, California)

Personnel

- Janet Jackson – writing, all vocals, production
- Jimmy Jam – writing (James Harris III), all additional instruments, production
- Terry Lewis – writing, all additional instruments, production
- Dewey Bunnell – writing
- David Barry – guitar
- Alex Richbourg – drum and MIDI programming
- Steve Hodge – recording, mixing
- Brad Yost – recording and mixing assistant
- Xavier Smith – recording and mixing assistant
- Brian "Big Bass" Gardner – mastering
- Mike Bozzi – mastering assistant

== Charts ==
=== Weekly charts ===
Chart (2001)	Peak position
Australia (ARIA)	15
Belgium (Ultratop 50 Flanders)	32
Belgium (Ultratop 50 Wallonia)	38
Canada (Nielsen SoundScan)	9
Canada CHR (Nielsen BDS)	1
Croatia International Airplay (HRT)	2
Europe (Eurochart Hot 100)	32
Europe (European Hit Radio)	1
France (SNEP)	58
Germany (GfK)	65
Ireland (IRMA)	23
Italy (FIMI)	34
Netherlands (Dutch Top 40)	28
Netherlands (Single Top 100)	46
New Zealand (Recorded Music NZ)	18
Scottish Singles Sales (Official Charts)	17
Sweden (Sverigetopplistan)	49
Switzerland (Schweizer Hitparade)	42
UK Singles (Official Charts)	11
UK Dance (Official Charts)	31
UK Hip Hop/R&B (Official Charts)	4
US Billboard Hot 100	3
US Adult Contemporary (Billboard)	29
US Adult Pop Airplay (Billboard)	26
US Dance Club Songs (Billboard)	1
US Hot R&B/Hip-Hop Songs (Billboard)	11
US Pop Airplay (Billboard)	3
US Rhythmic Airplay (Billboard)	12

Chart (2025)	Peak position
UK Dance Singles (OCC)	31

=== Year-end charts ===
Chart (2001)	Position
Canada (Nielsen SoundScan)	76
Canada Radio (Nielsen BDS)	20
US Billboard Hot 100	38
US Adult Top 40 (Billboard)	73
US Dance Club Play (Billboard)	28
US Mainstream Top 40 (Billboard)	20
US Rhythmic Top 40 (Billboard)	46

== Release history ==
Release dates and formats for "Someone to Call My Lover"
Region	Date	Format(s)	Label(s)	Ref.
United States	June 12, 2001	Contemporary hit radio; rhythmic contemporary radio	Virgin	
Germany	June 25, 2001	CD	EMI	
Japan	July 7, 2001	Maxi CD	EMI	
France	July 17, 2001	CD	EMI	
Australia	July 23, 2001	Maxi CD	EMI	
United States	July 23, 2001	Hot adult contemporary radio	Virgin	
United Kingdom	July 30, 2001	12-inch vinyl; cassette; maxi CD	Virgin	

== See also ==
- List of number-one dance singles of 2001 (U.S.)
