= Janet Jackson: Together Again =

2023–2024 concert tour by Janet Jackson

- Tour by Janet Jackson
- Promotional poster for the tour (2023)
- Location: Asia; Europe; North America
- Start date: April 14, 2023
- End date: October 10, 2024
- No. of shows: 94
- Supporting acts: Lil Kim; Ludacris; TLC; Nelly; Wyclef Jean
- Attendance: 834,045
- Box office: US$50.9 million (37 shows)

Janet Jackson concert chronology
- Janet Jackson: A Special 30th Anniversary Celebration of Rhythm Nation (2019); Janet Jackson: Together Again (2023–2024); Janet Jackson: Las Vegas (2024–2025)

Janet Jackson: Together Again was the tenth concert tour by American singer Janet Jackson. The first leg of the tour in North America was announced on December 12, 2022, via Jackson's social media. The tour began on April 14, 2023, in Hollywood, Florida, and concluded in Amsterdam, Netherlands, on October 10, 2024. The tour takes its name from Jackson's international hit single from The Velvet Rope (1997).

== Background ==
On December 12, 2022, Jackson announced the first 33 dates in North America for April to June 2023. Ticket pre-sales began on December 13, 2022, and general ticket sales began on December 16, 2022. The tour announcement also revealed Ludacris as the opening act. Four days later, four shows were added due to high demand in Hollywood, Atlanta and New York City and Allentown, Pennsylvania. Later, a San Bernardino date was announced at the Yaamava' Casino & Resort.

On April 30, 2023, Lil' Kim was announced as the opening act at the Allentown show. On June 6, 2023, a show at the Venue at Thunder Valley, near Sacramento, California, was announced. In November 2023, Jackson announced six additional shows in Hawaii, United States and Japan, with TLC joining the later dates; additional concerts Hawaii and the Bahamas were added in December. On January 16, 2024, Jackson announced 35 shows in North America to take place in June and July of the same year; tickets went on-sale January 19. On April 29, 2024, Jackson announced ten shows in Europe to take place in the fall of 2024. Four days later, it was announced she would headline the Essence Music Festival in New Orleans on July 7, 2024. An additional date at London's O2 Arena was added in June 2024.

On September 17, 2024, following the death of Tito Jackson two days prior, the September 21 concert at Kyalami Grand Prix Circuit was cancelled.

== Accolades ==
List of tour accolades
Year	Organization	Award	Result	Ref.
2025	Pollstar Awards	R&B Tour of the Year	Nominated	

== Set list ==
=== April 2023 to May 2024 ===
This set list is from the April 14, 2023, concert in Hollywood. It does not represent all concerts from this period.

Act I

1. "Damita Jo"
2. "Together Again" (DJ Premier remix)
3. "Feedback"
4. "So Much Betta"
5. "If"
6. "No Sleeep" / "Got 'til It's Gone" / "That's the Way Love Goes" / "Enjoy"

Act II

7. "What Have You Done for Me Lately" / "Nasty"
8. "The Pleasure Principle"
9. "Because of Love"
10. "When I Think of You" / "Diamonds"
11. "The Best Things In Life Are Free"
12. "Control"

Act III

13. "When We Oooo" (intermission interlude)
14. "Together Again" (Deeper remix)
15. "Come Back to Me" / "Let's Wait Awhile"
16. "Lonely" / "Funny How Time Flies (When You're Having Fun)" (remix)
17. "Again"
18. "Any Time, Any Place"
19. "I Get Lonely" (TNT remix)

Act IV

20. "The Body That Loves You" (interlude) (contains elements of "Runaway", "You Want This", and "Spending Time with You")
21. "Doesn't Really Matter"
22. "All for You"
23. "Come On Get Up"
24. "Free Xone" / "Throb"
25. "Girlfriend/Boyfriend" / "Like You Don't Love Me" / "Do It 2 Me"
26. "So Excited"

Act V

27. "New Agenda" / "The Knowledge"
28. "Miss You Much"
29. "Love Will Never Do (Without You)"
30. "Alright" / "Escapade"
31. "Scream"
32. "Black Cat"
33. "Rhythm Nation"

Act VI: Encore

34. "Together Again"

=== June to October 2024 ===
This set list is from the June 4, 2024, concert in Thousand Palms. It does not represent all concerts from this period.

Act I

1. "Night"
2. "2nite"
3. "SloLove"
4. "Rock with U"
5. "Throb"
6. "All Nite (Don't Stop)"
7. "No Sleeep"
8. "Got 'til It's Gone"
9. "That's the Way Love Goes"
10. "Love Will Never Do (Without You)"

Act II

11. "What Have You Done for Me Lately"
12. "Nasty"
13. "The Pleasure Principle"
14. "You Want This"
15. "When I Think of You"
16. "Diamonds"
17. "The Best Things in Life Are Free"
18. "Control"
19. "Son of a Gun (I Betcha Think This Song Is About You)"
20. "Take Care"
21. "Let's Wait Awhile" (contains elements of "Lonely" and "Funny How Time Flies (When You're Having Fun)")
22. "Again"
23. "Any Time, Any Place"
24. "I Get Lonely"
25. "With U"

Act III

26. "Make Me"
27. "All for You"
28. "Alright"
29. "Escapade"
30. "Miss You Much"
31. "Feedback"
32. "So Excited"

Act IV

33. "State of the World"
34. "The Knowledge"
35. "If"
36. "Scream" (contains elements of "If" and "Black Cat")
37. "Rhythm Nation"

Encore

38. "Someone to Call My Lover"
39. "Together Again"

=== Alterations ===
- Jermaine Dupri joined Jackson during her performance of "Do It 2 Me" at the Atlanta concert on April 26, 2023. An unreleased song called "Keep Dancing" was also performed at the same date.
- Beginning with the April 30, 2023, concert in St. Louis, "Show Me" was added to the set list, succeeding "Like You Don't Love Me".
- During the May 9, 2023, concert in New York City, Busta Rhymes joined Jackson to perform "What's It Gonna Be?!".
- During the May 27, 2023, concert in Tinley Park, "Make Me" was performed.
- During the May 28, 2023, concert in Milwaukee, "Rock with U" was performed.
- During the June 3, 2023, concert in The Woodlands, "All Nite (Don't Stop)" was performed.
- During the June 4, 2023, concert in Austin, "Strawberry Bounce" was performed.
- During the December 1, 2023, concert in Houston, Jackson performed "Better Days" for the first time.
- During the October 10, 2024, concert in Amsterdam, Jackson replaced "Make Me" and "Someone to Call My Lover" with "Runaway" and "Whoops Now", respectively.

== Tour dates ==
List of 2023 concerts
Date (2023)	City	Country	Venue	Supporting acts	Attendance	Revenue
April 14	Hollywood	United States	Hard Rock Live	Ludacris	—	—
April 16	Hollywood	United States	Hard Rock Live	Ludacris	—	—
April 19	Orlando	United States	Amway Center	Ludacris	—	—
April 21	Savannah	United States	Enmarket Arena	Ludacris	—	—
April 22	Birmingham	United States	Legacy Arena	Ludacris	—	—
April 25	Columbia	United States	Colonial Life Arena	Ludacris	—	—
April 26	Atlanta	United States	State Farm Arena	Ludacris	—	$3,057,192
April 28 (Note: The April 28, 2023, concert was originally scheduled for April 27 of the same year, but was rescheduled to avoid any potential conflict with an Atlanta Hawks game during the 2023 NBA playoffs.)	Atlanta	United States	State Farm Arena	Ludacris	—	$3,057,192
April 29	Memphis	United States	FedExForum	Ludacris	—	—
April 30	St. Louis	United States	Enterprise Center	Ludacris	—	—
May 2	Kansas City	United States	T-Mobile Center	Ludacris	—	—
May 4	Nashville	United States	Bridgestone Arena	Ludacris	—	—
May 6	Bristow	United States	Jiffy Lube Live	Ludacris	—	—
May 8 (Note: The May 8, 2023, concert was originally scheduled for May 10 of the same year, but was rescheduled to avoid any potential conflict with the New York Knicks playoff game.)	New York City	United States	Madison Square Garden	Ludacris	24,500 / 24,500	$3,800,000
May 9	New York City	United States	Madison Square Garden	Ludacris	24,500 / 24,500	$3,800,000
May 12	Charlotte	United States	PNC Music Pavilion	Ludacris	—	—
May 13	Baltimore	United States	CFG Bank Arena	Ludacris	—	—
May 14	Virginia Beach	United States	Veterans United Home Loans Amphitheater	Ludacris	—	—
May 18	Allentown	United States	PPL Center	Lil' Kim	—	—
May 19	Mansfield	United States	Xfinity Center	Ludacris	—	—
May 20	Atlantic City	United States	Hard Rock Live at Etess Arena	Ludacris	—	—
May 23	Toronto	Canada	Budweiser Stage	Ludacris	—	—
May 24	Detroit	United States	Little Caesars Arena	Ludacris	—	—
May 26	Noblesville	United States	Ruoff Music Center	Ludacris	—	—
May 27	Tinley Park	United States	Credit Union 1 Amphitheatre	Ludacris	—	—
May 28	Milwaukee	United States	American Family Insurance Amphitheater	Ludacris	—	—
May 30	Saint Paul	United States	Xcel Energy Center	Ludacris	—	—
June 2	Dallas	United States	Dos Equis Pavilion	Ludacris	—	—
June 3	The Woodlands	United States	Cynthia Woods Mitchell Pavilion	Ludacris	—	—
June 4	Austin	United States	Moody Center	Ludacris	—	—
June 7	Phoenix	United States	Talking Stick Resort Amphitheatre	Ludacris	—	—
June 9	Irvine	United States	FivePoint Amphitheatre	Ludacris	—	—
June 10	Los Angeles	United States	Hollywood Bowl	Ludacris	—	$2,800,000
June 11	Chula Vista	United States	North Island Credit Union Amphitheatre	Ludacris	—	—
June 14	San Bernardino	United States	Yaamava’ Theater	—N/a	—	—
June 16	Mountain View	United States	Shoreline Amphitheatre	Ludacris	—	—
June 20	Portland	United States	Moda Center	Ludacris	—	—
June 21	Seattle	United States	Climate Pledge Arena	Ludacris	—	—
October 27	Lincoln	United States	The Venue at Thunder Valley	—N/a	—	—
October 28 (Note: This concert is a part of the ONE Musicfest 2023.)	Atlanta	United States	Piedmont Park	—N/a	—	—
December 1 (Note: This concert is a part of 2023 World AIDS Day Concert.)	Houston	United States	NRG Arena	—N/a	—	—

List of 2024 concerts
Date (2024)	City	Country	Venue	Supporting acts	Attendance	Revenue
March 8	Honolulu	United States	Blaisdell Arena	—N/a	—	$2,396,293
March 9	Honolulu	United States	Blaisdell Arena	—N/a	—	$2,396,293
March 10	Honolulu	United States	Blaisdell Arena	—N/a	—	$2,396,293
March 13	Quezon City (Note: Labelled as Manila in promotional material.)	Philippines	Smart Araneta Coliseum	—N/a	—	—
March 16	Nagoya	Japan	Port Messe	TLC	—	—
March 17	Osaka	Japan	Osaka-jō Hall	TLC	—	—
March 20	Yokohama	Japan	K-Arena Yokohama	TLC	—	—
April 27 (Note: This concert is a part of the 2024 Music Making Waves concert series.)	Paradise Island	Bahamas	Atlantis Bahamas	—N/a	—	—
June 4	Thousand Palms (Note: Labelled as Palm Desert in promotional material.)	United States	Acrisure Arena	Nelly	—	—
June 6	Chula Vista	United States	North Island Credit Union Amphitheatre	Nelly	—	—
June 8	Inglewood	United States	Kia Forum	Nelly	—	—
June 9	Anaheim	United States	Honda Center	Nelly	—	—
June 11	Sacramento	United States	Golden 1 Center	Nelly	—	—
June 12	San Francisco	United States	Chase Center	Nelly	—	—
June 14	West Valley City (Note: Labelled as Salt Lake City in promotional material.)	United States	Utah First Credit Union Amphitheatre	Nelly	—	—
June 16	Denver	United States	Ball Arena	Nelly	—	—
June 18	Saint Paul	United States	Xcel Energy Center	Nelly	—	—
June 19	Chicago	United States	United Center	Nelly	—	—
June 21	Maryland Heights (Note: Labelled as St. Louis in promotional material.)	United States	Hollywood Casino Amphitheatre	Nelly	—	—
June 22	Cincinnati	United States	Riverbend Music Center	Nelly	—	—
June 23	Indianapolis	United States	Gainbridge Fieldhouse	Nelly	—	—
June 25	Cleveland	United States	Rocket Mortgage FieldHouse	Nelly	—	—
June 26	Philadelphia	United States	Wells Fargo Center	Nelly	—	—
June 28	Boston	United States	TD Garden	Nelly	—	—
June 29	Hartford	United States	Xfinity Theatre	Nelly	—	—
July 2	Clarkston (Note: Labelled as Detroit in promotional material.)	United States	Pine Knob Music Theatre	Nelly	—	—
July 3	Toronto	Canada	Scotiabank Arena	Nelly	—	—
July 5	Darien (Note: Labelled as Buffalo in promotional material.)	United States	Darien Lake Performing Arts Center	Nelly	—	—
July 6	Hershey	United States	Hersheypark Stadium	Nelly	—	—
July 7 (Note: This concert is a part of the Essence Music Festival.)	New Orleans	United States	Caesars Superdome	—N/a	—	—
July 9	Newark	United States	Prudential Center	Nelly	—	—
July 10	Brooklyn	United States	Barclays Center	Nelly	—	—
July 12	Washington, D.C.	United States	Capital One Arena	Nelly	—	—
July 13	Baltimore	United States	CFG Bank Arena	Nelly	—	—
July 14	Charlotte	United States	PNC Music Pavilion	Nelly	—	—
July 16	Tampa	United States	MidFlorida Credit Union Amphitheatre	Nelly	—	—
July 18	West Palm Beach	United States	iTHINK Financial Amphitheatre	—N/a	—	—
July 20	Orlando	United States	Kia Center	Nelly	—	—
July 21	Atlanta	United States	State Farm Arena	Nelly	—	—
July 25	Fort Worth	United States	Dickies Arena	Nelly	—	—
July 26	Oklahoma City	United States	Paycom Center	Nelly	—	—
July 27	Austin	United States	Moody Center	Nelly	—	—
July 30	Phoenix	United States	Footprint Center	Nelly	—	—
September 25	Paris	France	Accor Arena	Wyclef Jean	—	—
September 27	Birmingham	England	Utilita Arena Birmingham	Wyclef Jean	—	—
September 28	London	England	The O_{2} Arena	TBA	–	—
September 29	London	England	The O_{2} Arena	TBA	–	—
October 1	Manchester	England	Co-op Live	Wyclef Jean	—	—
October 3	Antwerp	Belgium	Sportpaleis	Wyclef Jean	—	—
October 5	Munich	Germany	Olympiahalle	Wyclef Jean	—	—
October 6	Cologne	Germany	Lanxess Arena	Wyclef Jean	—	—
October 8	Berlin	Germany	Uber Arena	Wyclef Jean	—	—
October 10	Amsterdam	Netherlands	Ziggo Dome	Wyclef Jean	—	—
Total					—	—

=== Canceled concerts ===
List of canceled concerts
Date (2024)	City	Country	Venue	Reason	Ref.
May 4 (Note: This concert was to be part of the Lovers & Friends Festival 2024.)	Winchester (Note: Labelled as Las Vegas in promotional material.)	United States	Las Vegas Festival Grounds	Inclement weather	
July 23	New Orleans	United States	Smoothie King Center	Schedule change	
September 21 (Note: This concert was to be part of the DStv Delicious Festival 2024.)	Johannesburg	South Africa	Kyalami Grand Prix Circuit	Death of Tito Jackson	
October 13 (Note: The October 13, 2024, concert in Glasgow, Scotland, was originally scheduled for September 30 of the same year, but was postponed due to "scheduling difficulties".)	Glasgow	Scotland	OVO Hydro	Scheduling difficulties	

== Personnel ==
- Eric "PikFunk" Smith – bass
- Mike Reid – drums
- Errol Cooney – guitar
- DJ Aktive – turntables
- Daniel Jones – musical director, keyboards
- Gil Duldulao – creative director
- Dean Lee – choreographer
- Luther Brown – choreographer
- Darius "Dario" Boatner – dancer
- Mariusz Maniek Kotarski – dancer
- Denzel Chisolm – dancer
- Steven Guero Charles – dancer
