= Evelina Chao =

American violinist of Chinese descent

Evelina Chao (born 1949) is an American violinist of Chinese descent.

== Early life ==
Chao was born in Chicago, Illinois to Edward C. T. Chao and Vera Lin. From 1968 to 1969 she attended Oberlin College, but transferred and earned a bachelor of music degree from the Juilliard School in 1972 where she was Dorothy DeLay and Ivan Galamian scholar. Between 1972 and 1974, she played her first violin at the Amici Quartet of Binghamton University from which she obtained her master's degree in 1974.

== Career ==
After leaving Binghamton, Chao became a teacher and freelance musician at both New York and Pennsylvania. In 1977, she joined Indianapolis Symphony Orchestra and in 1980 she left it to become a member of the Saint Paul Chamber Orchestra instead. Since 1980s, she is an assistant principal violinist at the Saint Paul Symphony Orchestra in Minnesota.

Besides playing with the Saint Paul Orchestra, she also played for the National Symphony and both Arlington and Fairfax Symphonies. She also had appeared with other musicians such as Pinchas Zukerman, Joseph Silverstein, Jaime Laredo, Shlomo Mintz, Yo-Yo Ma, Steven Doane, Seyda Ruga Suzuki, and William Preucil. In 2001, she participated at the Token Creek Chamber Music Festival.

In May 1999 Chao and Saint Paul Chamber Orchestra had played Piano Quintet by Johannes Brahms on Minnesota Public Radio, along with pianist Lydia Artymiw, violinists Frieda Fan and Elsa Nilsson and violist Peter Howard.

Since 2008, she is a music director at the Madeline Island Music Camp. In 2013, she was one of 10 performers that filed retirement from the St. Paul Chamber Orchestra.

Chao is also an author of the 2004 memoir Yeh Yeh's House and is an author of the 1985 Gates of Grace.
