= Son of a Gun (I Betcha Think This Song Is About You) =

2001 single by Janet Jackson

Single by Janet Jackson with Carly Simon featuring Missy Elliott

from the album All for You
- Released: November 6, 2001
- Recorded: 2000–2001
- Studio: Flyte Tyme (Edina, Minnesota); Record One (Los Angeles)
- Genre: Pop; hip-hop; R&B
- Length: 5:56 (album version); 4:14 (Flyte Tyme radio edit)
- Label: Virgin
- Songwriters: Janet Jackson; James Harris III, Terry Lewis; Carly Simon
- Producers: Janet Jackson; Jimmy Jam and Terry Lewis

Janet Jackson singles chronology
"Someone to Call My Lover" (2001)	"Son of a Gun (I Betcha Think This Song Is About You)" (2001)	"Feel It Boy" (2002)

Carly Simon singles chronology
"Love of My Life" (1992)	"Son of a Gun (I Betcha Think This Song Is About You)" (2001)	"Let It Snow" (2005)

Missy Elliott singles chronology
"Take Away" (2001)	"Son of a Gun (I Betcha Think This Song Is About You)" (2001)	"Oops (Oh My)" (2002)

Music video
- "Son of a Gun (I Betcha Think This Song Is About You)" (remix) on YouTube

"Son of a Gun (I Betcha Think This Song Is About You)" is a song by American singer-songwriter Janet Jackson with Carly Simon from Jackson's seventh studio album, All for You (2001). It was written and produced by Jackson, Jimmy Jam and Terry Lewis, with additional lyrics by Simon. The R&B and hip-hop song is built around a sample of 1972's "You're So Vain" by Simon, who also added some new spoken parts into the song; it talks about an unidentified man who attempted to extort money from Jackson. A remix featuring Missy Elliott was released as the third and final single from the album on November 6, 2001, by Virgin Records.

The album version of "Son of a Gun (I Betcha Think This Song Is About You)" received mixed reviews from music critics, with some calling it a highlight from the album, and others criticizing Simon's rapping; the remix version received a similarly mixed reaction from reviewers. It was also met with weak charting positions worldwide due to Virgin abruptly ending the promotional campaign for All For You due to the company's financial difficulties; in Jackson's native United States, the song reached a peak of number 28 on the US Billboard Hot 100, her first single in the country to miss the top ten in over a decade, as well as her lowest-charting single since 1983. The song's accompanying music video directed by Francis Lawrence – which depicts Jackson stalking a man at Los Angeles' Millennium Biltmore Hotel – received positive reviews, and inspired such acts as Britney Spears. "Son of a Gun (I Betcha Think This Song Is About You)" was performed on the 2001–2002 All for You Tour.

== Background and release ==
According to Jackson, she phoned American singer-songwriter Carly Simon, asking for permission to use samples of her song "You're So Vain" (1971), but Simon wanted to re-record her vocals. She agreed, with Simon wanting to write new lines. Jackson's producer Jimmy Jam sent her the tracks they were already working on, and she went into a studio on Martha's Vineyard to record some material. She rapped, initially thinking that Jackson and the producers would not use it, but they decided to marry both tracks, as the singers thought it "worked perfectly", and it became a duet. Simon expressed that Jackson "could not have been sweeter or more appreciative".

"Son of a Gun (I Betcha Think This Song Is About You)" generated media speculation of who exactly the man described in the song was. Many journalists believed the song was about Jackson's estranged husband René Elizondo Jr. Jackson responded: "Everybody says that. Actually, that song's about a few people, not one person in particular. Everyone likes to [say], 'Ah, I know that's about Rene.' It's about a few people that have entered and exited my life." Simon created a similar controversy when she released "You're So Vain". It was speculated to be about Warren Beatty or Mick Jagger, both of which she denied.

In 2000, Jackson called American rapper Missy "Misdemeanor" Elliott to reveal that she loved her work. She asked the rapper to work with her on a remix of the song "Son of a Gun (I Betcha Think This Song Is About You)". Elliott then wrote and rapped for the remix, and became the third single from All for You. It was serviced to American contemporary hit radio on November 6, 2001, and was released in the United Kingdom on December 10, 2001, as a CD and cassette single.

== Composition ==
"Son of a Gun (I Betcha Think This Song Is About You)"
30-second sample from the song's chorus where Jackson and Simon sing "I betcha think this song is about you" repeatedly.

"Son of a Gun (I Betcha Think This Song Is About You)" is an R&B and hip-hop song which features a "rap poem" from Simon and samples her song "You're So Vain". Its composition excoriates an unfaithful lover for attempting to extort money, described as a "mean-spirited duet that rails against enemies." Jackson unveils anger and deceit, saying "Thought you'd get the money too / Greedy motherfuckers try to have their cake and eat it too". She also offers a comeuppance to a "baby gigolo" who hollers at "everything that walks / No substance, just small talk." Simon also cited the claims of sampled song "You're So Vain" to be written about Mick Jagger, singing "The apricot scarf was worn by Nick / Nothing in the words refer to Mick". In response to critics regarding it about her divorce, Jackson explained it was directed towards several people, while Jimmy Jam revealed it to be written in regards to music executives and lawyers.

== Critical reception ==
Both the album and remix versions of "Son of a Gun (I Betcha Think This Song Is About You)" received mixed reviews from music critics. While reviewing All for You, Dan Aquilante from New York Post commented that the track would be remembered as one of the highlights from the album. Michael Paoletta from Billboard magazine called the song a "clever sister-to-sister" song. The New Rolling Stone Album Guide called the duet between Jackson and Simon "harsh", and found Simon's rap "silly". John Mulvey of Yahoo! Music referred to it as "bizarre", and criticized Simon's rap, classifying it as "incompetent". AllMusic's contributor Stephen Thomas Erlewine also was one of the reviewers who were unsatisfied with rapping by Simon. Sal Cinquemani from Slant Magazine considered the song the album's biggest misstep. He likened it to a car wreck: "impossible not to be horrified yet strangely intrigued", and called Simon's spoken-word verses "embarrassing".

Chuck Taylor from Billboard reviewed the remix version of "Son of a Gun (I Betcha Think This Song Is About You)" and considered it "more of a breakdown than anything we might regard as a standard composition, but the ingredients somehow make musical gumbo". Contactmusic.com criticized the number of guests on the single version, but said it created a "soulful and very catchy version", and noted that its "Grover Washington style sax break and the kind of infectious percussion vibe that Masters at Work are so adept at making".

== Chart performance ==
"Son of a Gun (I Betcha Think This Song Is About You)" debuted at number 72 on the US Billboard Hot 100, before reaching a peak of number 28. This peak became her lowest since 1983, when "Come Give Your Love to Me" reached number 58. Since the release of Control in 1986, every single released by the singer had peaked within the top 10, with the exception of "The Pleasure Principle". The song additionally reached numbers 7, 20 and 26 on the Dance Club Songs, Mainstream Top 40 and Hot R&B/Hip-Hop Songs component charts, respectively.

In Europe, the reception to "Son of a Gun (I Betcha Think This Song Is About You)" was polarized. In the United Kingdom, the song was released on the same day as her brother Michael's single "Cry"; Janet's single fared better, peaking at number 13, while Michael's reached number 25. "Son of a Gun (I Betcha Think This Song Is About You)" remained for 10 weeks inside the chart. On the mainland, the song failed to achieve the same success, peaking at number 69 in Germany, 54 in Romania, and 56 in Switzerland. However, it did achieve moderate success in Denmark, reaching the top 20. In Oceania, the song debuted at its peak of number 20 in Australia, and reached number 49 in New Zealand.

== Music video ==
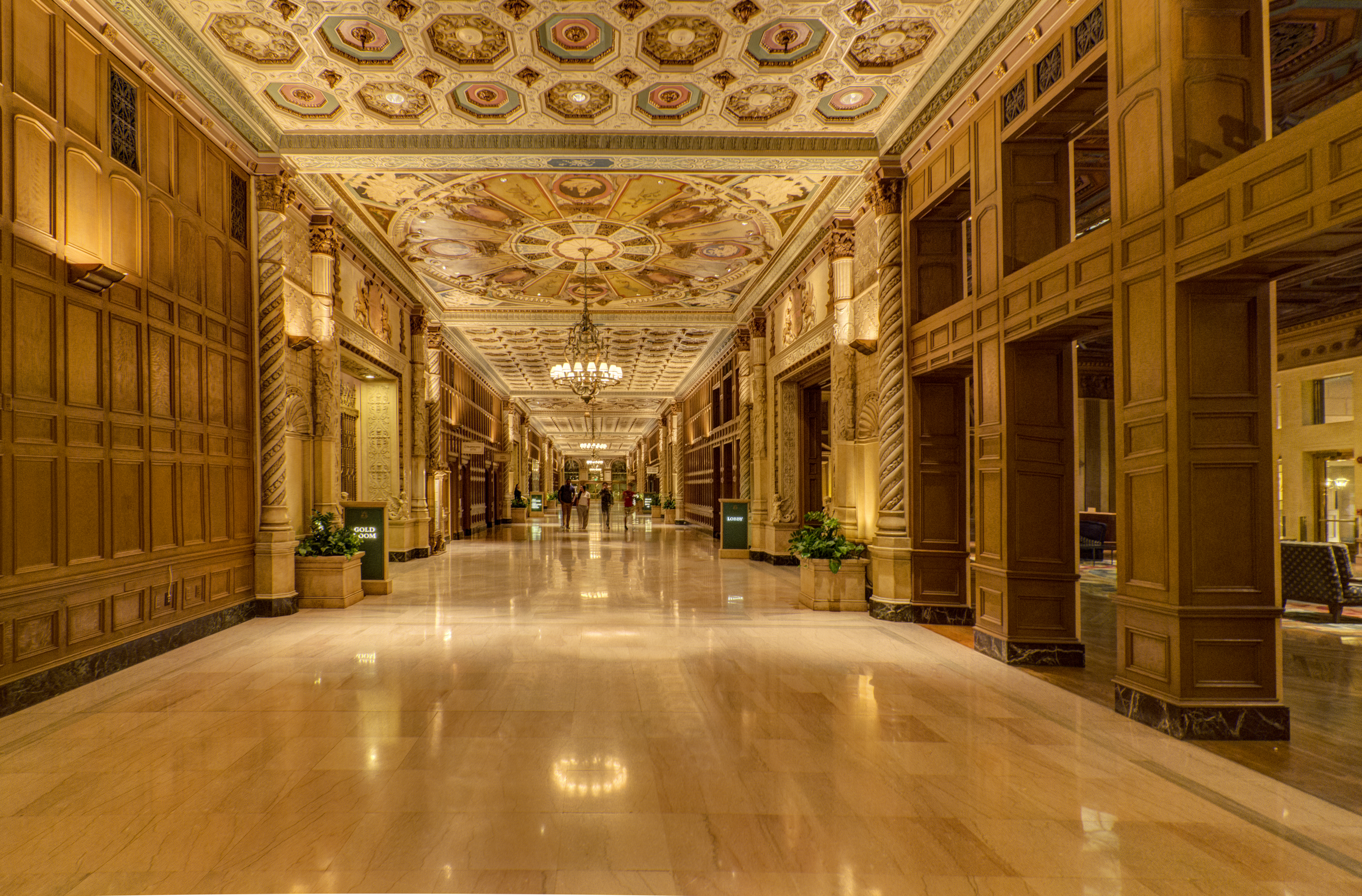
One of the hallways of the Biltmore Hotel featured in the video

The music video for "Son of a Gun (I Betcha Think This Song Is About You)" was directed by Francis Lawrence, with the Original Flyte Tyme remix of the song being used. It was filmed at the Millennium Biltmore Hotel in Downtown Los Angeles in September 2001. In the video, Jackson is stalking a man (played by Jerell Scott) in an abandoned hotel. She summons Elliott and a legion of zombies, including one that emerges from a toilet. Jackson is also seen eating a spider, smashing jugs of water with a baseball bat, and taunting the man using telekinetic powers. Simon does not appear in the music video. A second music video using the P. Diddy remix also was released, and uses the same footage of the original with Diddy appearing in some parts.

The video was nominated for "Best Cinematography" at the MVPA Awards in 2002. It was also placed as the seventh best music video of 2001 by Slant Magazine, who said "it's been a while since we've seen the reigning Jackson crank up a little attitude. It's her own mini-'Thriller', if you will". The video was included on the 2004 video compilation From Janet to Damita Jo: The Videos.

A reported Jackson admirer, American singer Britney Spears was inspired by the "Son of a Gun (I Betcha Think This Song Is About You)" music video. The following year, she used the Millennium Baltimore Hotel in the music video for her single "Overprotected (Darkchild Remix)". Spears made several references to Jackson's video in her own, such as walking down the hotel lobby.

== Live performance ==
"Son of a Gun (I Betcha Think This Song Is About You)" was performed by Jackson during the All for You Tour in 2001 and 2002. Gina Vivinetto from St. Petersburg Times, while reviewing the concert, noted that fans cheered with the performance. The February 16, 2002, final date of the tour at the Aloha Stadium in Hawaii, was broadcast by HBO, and had an appearance by Elliott on the performance of the song. This rendition was also added to the setlist at its DVD release, Janet: Live in Hawaii, in 2002. The song was also used during the DJ Intermission session on the 2017 State of the World Tour. 22 years later, Jackson included the song on her 2024 Together Again Tour. The song was included in Act II, with Jackson and her dancers performing the song with baseball bats. Jackson featured the song on the setlist for her Janet Jackson: Las Vegas show in 2024-2025.

== Track listings ==
US 12-inch single

A1. P. Diddy Super Extended Remix Edited featuring Missy Elliott and P. Diddy – 7:59
A2. The Original Flyte Time Remix Video Version featuring Missy Elliott – 4:13
B1. Rock Remix featuring Missy Elliott – 4:10
B2. P. Diddy Super Extended Instrumental – 7:55

European 12-inch single

A1. P. Diddy Extended Remix featuring Missy Elliott and P. Diddy – 7:59
A2. Route 80 Remix featuring Missy Elliott – 4:09
B1. Cottonbelly Dub – 5:27
B2. The Original Flyte Tyme Remix featuring Missy Elliott – 4:13

European CD maxi single

1. The Original Flyte Tyme Remix featuring Missy Elliott – 4:13
2. P. Diddy Remix featuring Missy Elliott and P. Diddy – 5:01
3. Cottonbelly Remix – 5:31
4. Rock Remix featuring Missy Elliott – 4:10
5. Album Version – 5:56

UK CD single

1. The Original Flyte Tyme Remix featuring Missy Elliott – 4:13
2. P. Diddy Extended Remix featuring Missy Elliott and P. Diddy – 7:59
3. Route 80 Remix featuring Missy Elliott – 4:09

== Personnel ==
Credits are adapted from Japanese promo CD single liner notes.

- Janet Jackson – vocals, songwriter, producer
- Carly Simon – vocals, songwriter
- James Harris III – songwriter, producer
- Terry Lewis – songwriter, producer
- Alex Al – bass
- Brian Gardner – mastering
- Mike Bozzi – mastering assistant
- Alex Richbourg – programming
- Steve Hodge – recording
- Jason Elmore – vocal recording assistant
- Mike Abbott – vocal recording
- Brad Yost – vocal recording assistant
- Xavier Smith – vocal recording assistant
- Jimmy Parr – vocal recording
- Tom Sweeney – vocal recording assistant
- Dave Rideau – vocal recording

== Charts ==
Weekly chart performance for "Son of a Gun (I Betcha Think This Song Is About You)"
Chart (2001–2002)	Peak position
Australia (ARIA)	20
Australian Urban (ARIA)	9
Belgium (Ultratop 50 Flanders)	20
Belgium (Ultratop 50 Wallonia)	25
Croatia International Airplay (HRT) (Note: Only a partial archive of the Croatian chart is available so it is possible that the single had a higher peak.)	9
Denmark (Tracklisten)	19
Europe (Eurochart Hot 100)	45
Germany (GfK)	69
Ireland (IRMA)	21
Netherlands (Dutch Top 40)	34
Netherlands (Single Top 100)	34
New Zealand (Recorded Music NZ)	49
Romania (Romanian Top 100)	54
Scottish Singles Sales (Official Charts)	26
Sweden (Sverigetopplistan)	48
Switzerland (Schweizer Hitparade)	56
UK Singles (Official Charts)	13
UK Hip Hop/R&B (Official Charts)	2
US Billboard Hot 100	28
US Dance Club Songs (Billboard)	7
US Hot R&B/Hip-Hop Songs (Billboard)	26
US Pop Airplay (Billboard)	20
US Rhythmic Airplay (Billboard) with Missy Elliott, P. Diddy and Carly Simon	11

== Release history ==
Release dates and formats for "Son of a Gun (I Betcha Think This Song Is About You)"
Region	Date	Format(s)	Label(s)	Ref.
United States	November 6, 2001	Rhythmic contemporary radio; urban contemporary radio	Virgin	
United States	November 13, 2001	Contemporary hit radio	Virgin	
Australia	November 26, 2001	Maxi CD	EMI	
United Kingdom	December 10, 2001	Cassette; CD	Virgin	
Japan	December 27, 2001	Maxi CD	EMI	
