= Janet Remixed =

Remix album by Janet Jackson
- Released: March 13, 1995
- Recorded: 1992–1994
- Length: 72:53 (CD); 95:35 (Double LP)
- Label: Virgin
- Producer: James Samuel "Jimmy Jam" Harris III; Terry Lewis; Janet Jackson; David Morales; Frankie Knuckles; Nellee Hooper; R. Kelly; Gary "Jellybean" Johnson; CJ Mackintosh; Eric "E-Smoove" Miller; Steve Anderson; Dave Seaman

Janet Jackson chronology
Janet (1993)	Janet Remixed (1995)	Design of a Decade: 1986–1996 (1995)

Professional ratings
Review scores
Source	Rating
Smash Hits	3/5 stars

Janet Remixed (stylized as janet. Remixed) is the second remix album by American singer Janet Jackson. Released on March 13, 1995, it featured two non-album B-sides, including the radio hit "And On and On" and "70's Love Groove", as well as a number of exclusive remixes of tracks from the Janet album. The rare B-side to the single "If", "One More Chance", was not included on the CD version of Janet Remixed but on vinyl and cassette versions. However, like 1987's Control: The Remixes, it was never given a commercial release in Jackson's native United States.

== Track listing ==
Standard CD
No.	Title	Remixer(s)	Length
1.	"That's the Way Love Goes" (CJ FXTC Club Mix)	CJ Mackintosh	6:22
2.	"If" (Brothers in Rhythm House Mix)	Brothers in Rhythm	7:07
3.	"Because of Love" (Frankie & David Treat Mix)	Frankie Knuckles & David Morales	6:41
4.	"And On and On"		4:48
5.	"Throb" (Morales Badyard Club Mix)	David Morales	8:59
6.	"You Want This" (E-Smoove's House Anthem)	E-Smoove	9:43
7.	"Any Time, Any Place" (CJ's 12" Mix)	CJ Mackintosh	8:17
8.	"Where Are You Now" (Nellee Hooper Mix)	Nellee Hooper	5:20
9.	"70's Love Groove"		5:45
10.	"What'll I Do" (Dave Navarro Mix)	Dave Navarro	4:17
11.	"Any Time, Any Place" (R. Kelly Mix)	R. Kelly	5:11

Cassette
No.	Title	Remixer(s)	Length
1.	"That's the Way Love Goes" (CJ FXTC Club Mix)	CJ Mackintosh	6:22
2.	"And On and On"		4:48
3.	"Throb" (Morales Badyard Club Mix)	David Morales	8:59
4.	"You Want This" (E-Smoove's House Anthem)	E-Smoove	9:52
5.	"Any Time, Any Place" (CJ's 12" Mix)	CJ Mackintosh	8:17
6.	"One More Chance"		5:54
7.	"If" (Brothers in Rhythm House Mix)	Brothers in Rhythm	7:07
8.	"Where Are You Now" (Nellee Hooper Mix)	Nellee Hooper	5:20
9.	"That's the Way Love Goes" (CJ's 12" R&B Mix)	CJ Mackintosh	6:19
10.	"70's Love Groove"		5:45
11.	"You Want This" (Disco Theory)	Dewey B.	6:14
12.	"What'll I Do" (Dave Navarro Mix)	Dave Navarro	4:17
13.	"Because of Love" (Muggs Full Hip Hop Mix)	DJ Muggs	4:08
14.	"Any Time, Any Place" (R. Kelly Mix)	R. Kelly	5:11

UK Cassette/2 LP Vinyl
No.	Title	Remixer(s)	Length
1.	"That's the Way Love Goes" (CJ FXTC Club Mix)	CJ Mackintosh	6:22
2.	"If" (Brothers in Rhythm House Mix)	Brothers in Rhythm	7:07
3.	"Because of Love" (Frankie & David Treat Mix)	Frankie Knuckles & David Morales	6:41
4.	"And On and On"		4:48
5.	"Throb" (Morales Badyard Club Mix)	David Morales	8:59
6.	"You Want This" (E-Smoove's House Anthem)	E-Smoove	9:43
7.	"Any Time, Any Place" (CJ's 12" Mix)	CJ Mackintosh	8:17
8.	"Where Are You Now" (Nellee Hooper Mix)	Nellee Hooper	5:20
9.	"That's the Way Love Goes" (FXTC Bass Hit Dub)	CJ Mackintosh	6:14
10.	"70's Love Groove"		5:45
11.	"You Want This" (Disco Theory)	Dewey B.	6:14
12.	"What'll I Do" (Dave Navarro Mix)	Dave Navarro	4:17
13.	"Because of Love" (Muggs Full Hip Hop Mix)	DJ Muggs	4:08
14.	"One More Chance"		5:54
15.	"Any Time, Any Place" (R. Kelly Mix)	R. Kelly	5:11

== Personnel ==
- Jeff Bender – photography
- Brothers in Rhythm – production, remixing (track 2)
- Terry Burrus – piano (track 3)
- Steve Burton – keyboards (track 7)
- Peter Daou – keyboards (track 3)
- Dave Darlington – remix (track 1)
- Marius De Vries – programming (track 8)
- Patrick Demarchelier – photography
- Tom Dolan – design
- E-Smoove – production, remixing (track 6)
- René Elizondo Jr. – photography
- Flea – engineering (track 10)
- Kenny "Dope" Gonzales – drums (track 1)
- Jossie Harris – vocals (track 5)
- Steve Hodge – mixing
- Nellee Hooper – production, remixing (track 8)
- Janet Jackson – production (tracks 1–3, 5–8, 10, 11)
- Jimmy Jam – production (tracks 1–9, 11)
- Sandy Jenkins – engineering assistance (track 1)
- Jellybean Johnson – production (track 10)
- R. Kelly – production, remixing (track 11)
- Frankie Knuckles – remixing (track 3)
- Tina Landon – vocals (track 5)
- Terry Lewis – production (tracks 1–9, 11)
- Richard Lowe – remix engineering (Track 7)
- CJ Mackintosh – drums, keyboards, remixing (tracks 1, 7)
- MC Lyte – rapping (track 6)
- Peter Mokran – engineering (track 11)
- David Morales – percussion, remixing (tracks 3, 5)
- Dave Navarro – engineering, lead guitar (track 10)
- Len Peltier – art direction
- John Poppo – engineer (track 3)
- Dave Rideau – mixing (tracks 1–3, 5–11)
- Herb Ritts – photography
- Alan Sanderson – engineering (track 10)
- David Schiffman – remix engineering (track 10)
- Peter "Ski" Schwartz – keyboards (track 5)
- Paul Shapiro – saxophone (track 5)
- Chad Smith – engineering (track 10)
- Lem Springsteen – keyboards (track 5)
- Al Stone – engineering (track 8)
- David Sussman – engineering (track 5)
- Dom T. – additional keyboards (track 8)
- Satoshi Tomiie – keyboards (tracks 3, 5)
- "Little" Louie Vega – keyboards (track 1)
- Ellen von Unwerth – photography
- Danny Weatherspoon – keyboards (track 6)
- Steve Weeder – engineering (track 6)
- Paul Wright – engineering (track 2)

== Charts ==
Chart performance for Janet Remixed
Chart (1995)	Peak position
Australian Albums (ARIA)	64
Austrian Albums (Ö3 Austria)	22
Belgian Albums (Ultratop Wallonia)	32
Belgian Albums (Ultratop Wallonia)	16
Danish Albums (Hitlisten)	27
Dutch Albums (Album Top 100)	29
European Albums (Music & Media)	23
German Albums (Offizielle Top 100)	26
Japanese Albums (Oricon)	61
Scottish Albums (OCC)	44
Swedish Albums (Sverigetopplistan)	39
Swiss Albums (Schweizer Hitparade)	21
UK Albums (OCC)	15
UK R&B Albums (OCC)	3

== Release history ==
Release formats for Janet Remixed
Region	Date	Label	Format	Ref
Various	March 13, 1995	Virgin	LP; CD; cassette	
Japan	April 8, 1995	Virgin	CD	
