= Johnny Daye =

American soul music singer

Johnny Daye (March 17, 1948 – May 6, 2017) was an American soul music singer from Pittsburgh, Pennsylvania, who released six singles between 1965, when he signed to Danny Sims and Johnny Nash's Jomada record label, and 1968 recording two tracks on Stax Records. In 2007 he came out of retirement to sing on two tracks on Robert Peckman's first solo CD, Stirrin' Up Bees.

Daye was taken to Stax Records after being discovered in Pittsburgh by Otis Redding. He recorded the single "What'll I Do for Satisfaction", which was produced and co-written by Steve Cropper. The song was recorded by Janet Jackson on her 1993 album, Janet, as "What'll I Do". His other single for Stax was "Stay Baby Stay". Cropper stated in the liner notes to The Complete Stax/Volt Singles 1959–1968 that "Otis really wanted to do a lot with him. The kid was dynamite. Had Otis lived, he probably would have."

== Discography ==
1965

- "I'll Keep on Loving You" b/w "One of These Days" (Blue Star B-230)
- "Marry Me" b/w "Give Me Back My Ring" (Jomada M-600) – produced by Johnny Nash

1966

- "Good Time" b/w "I've Got Soul" (Jomada M-603) – produced by Johnny Nash

1967

- "A Lot of Progress" b/w "You're on Top" (Parkway P-119)

1968

- "What'll I Do for Satisfaction" b/w "I Need Somebody" (Stax 238)
- "Stay Baby Stay" b/w "I Love Love (Stax 0004)

2007

- "Let's Talk It Over" b/w "Stop and Take A Look" (on Robert Peckman, Stirrin’Up Bees, Bonedog Records BDRCD-22)
