= You Want This =

1994 single by Janet Jackson

Single by Janet Jackson featuring MC Lyte

from the album Janet
- B-side: "70's Love Groove"; "New Agenda"
- Released: October 11, 1994
- Studio: Flyte Tyme (Edina, Minnesota)
- Genre: New jack swing; funk
- Length: 4:46 (single mix feat. MC Lyte); 5:05 (album version)
- Label: Virgin
- Songwriters: Janet Jackson; James Harris III, Terry Lewis; Claydes Smith; Dennis "D.T." Thomas; Donald Boyce; George Brown; Richard Westfield; Robert "Kool" Bell; Robert "Spike" Mickens; Ronald Bell; Richard Dean Taylor; Frank Wilson; Pam Sawyer; Henry Cosby; Deke Richards
- Producers: Janet Jackson; Jimmy Jam and Terry Lewis

Janet Jackson singles chronology
"Throb" (1994)	"You Want This" (1994)	"Whoops Now" / "What'll I Do" (1995)

Music video
- "You Want This" on YouTube

"You Want This" is a song by American singer-songwriter Janet Jackson from her fifth studio album, Janet (1993). Released as the album's seventh single (sixth and final in the US) in October 1994 by Virgin Records, the track was written and produced by Jackson and Jimmy Jam and Terry Lewis. The single version, also used in the accompanying music video directed by Keir McFarlane, featured an additional rap verse from MC Lyte. The song was listed in the book Rock Song Index: The 7500 Most Important Songs for the Rock and Roll Era (2005) by Bruce Pollock.

== Song information ==
Based on samples from Diana Ross & the Supremes' 1968 song "Love Child" and Kool & the Gang's 1973 song "Jungle Boogie", the song is about Jackson being told by her girls that a guy is watching and wanting her. Jackson proclaims if the guy wants to be with her, he has to work for it. The single contains two B-sides, the janet. track "New Agenda" and the then-unreleased "70's Love Groove", which also appears on 1995's janet. Remixed. In the United States, however, "70's Love Groove" is listed as a double A-side with "You Want This" on Hot 100, starting on its third week.

MC Lyte said of the song: "By that time, Janet and I were friends. It was just a matter of her asking if I wanted to do it. I was just about to go on tour with her and do her U.S. leg. Coupled with that, they asked me to do a song with her that we could perform while we were on that tour.”

== Critical reception ==
Professional ratings
Review scores
Source	Rating
The Charlotte Post	4/5 stars

Larry Flick from Billboard magazine described the song as "a bouncy ditty that plunges from a sample of 'Love Child' by the Supremes into a rollicking jack/funk beat." He added, "The groove sparks an appealing vocal that is by turns playful and seductive."

== Chart performance ==
The single peaked at number eight on the US Billboard Hot 100 and number nine on the Hot R&B/Hip-Hop Songs, and was moderately successful internationally, making it to the top twenty in the UK, Australia, and New Zealand. The single entered the UK R&B Singles chart at #2.

== Music video ==
The music video for "You Want This" was directed by Keir McFarlane and filmed in Desert Shores, California in August 1994. Loosely based on Russ Meyer's 1965 film Faster, Pussycat! Kill! Kill!, it centers on Jackson as a female gang leader and her friends encountering two men. MC Lyte declared, "I was totally psyched to be in a video with Janet Jackson. The only thing I wish I did know how to do was dance [laughs]. Had I been able to dance, I could have really participated." A black-and-white version of the video was first released to music channels, while a colorized video was released one month later. CST Entertainment Imaging Inc. was responsible for the transformation, with 30 to 40 members of the company's Color F/X division split into three shifts, and worked for nearly three weeks to create this version. Both versions are available on the 1994 video compilation janet. The colorized video is featured on 2001's repackaged All for You album, as well as the 2004 DVD From Janet to Damita Jo: The Videos.

== Live performances ==
Jackson has performed the song on several of her tours and residences janet. Tour, Rock Witchu Tour, the Number Ones, Up Close and Personal, Unbreakable World Tour, the State of the World Tour, the 2024 Together Again Tour, as well as her 2024–2025 Janet Jackson: Las Vegas residency. Michael Jackson would often add a vocal sample of the opening "you know you want me" line from "You Want This" in live performances of his song "Dangerous".

== Track listings ==
- US 12-inch single (Y-38455)
1. Mafia & Fluxy Club Mix – 6:28
2. Mafia & Fluxy Dancehall Mix – 4:31
3. Spoiled Milk. Remix – 4:44
4. Remix – 4:46
5. "New Agenda" – 4:00
6. "70's Love Groove" – 5:45
- US CD single (V25H-38455)
1. Remix – 4:46
2. LP Edit – 4:15
3. Mafia & Fluxy Dancehall Mix – 4:31
4. Spoiled Milk. Remix – 4:44
5. "New Agenda" – 4:00
6. "70's Love Groove" – 5:45
- US cassette single (4Y-38466)
1. E-Smoove's House Anthem – 9:48
2. Disco Theory (No Rap) – 6:16
3. "70's Love Groove" – 5:45
4. E-Smoove's Underdub – 7:21
5. E-Smoove's Anthem Dub – 6:32
6. Smoove Soul 12-inch – 6:20
- UK 12-inch single (VST 1519)
1. E-Smoove's House Anthem – 9:48
2. E-Smoove's Anthem Dub – 6:32
3. E-Smoove's Underdub – 7:21
4. Disco Theory – 6:16
5. Smoove Soul 7-inch – 4:16
- UK CD 1 (VSCDT 1519)
- Australian CD single (8926692)
1. Remix – 4:46
2. E-Smoove's Anthem 7-inch – 4:16
3. Mafia & Fluxy Dancehall Mix – 4:31
4. Spoiled Milk. Remix – 4:44
5. Disco Theory – 6:16
6. Funk Extravaganza – 7:42
7. Smoove Soul 12-inch – 6:20
- UK CD 2 (VSCDG/T1519)
1. LP Edit – 4:15
2. Mafia & Fluxy Club Mix – 6:29
3. "70's Love Groove" – 5:45
4. "And on and On" – 4:49
- Japanese 3-inch CD single (VJDP10235)
1. Remix – 4:46
2. "New Agenda" – 4:00

== Charts ==
=== Weekly charts ===
Chart (1994–95)	Peak position
Australia (ARIA)	16
Canada Top Singles (RPM)	15
Canada Contemporary Hit Radio (The Record)	3
Canada Dance Tracks (The Record)	16
Europe (Eurochart Hot 100)	54
Europe (European Dance Radio)	3
Europe (European Hit Radio)	33
Germany (GfK)	90
Israel (Israeli Singles Chart)	30
Netherlands (Dutch Top 40 Tipparade)	2
Netherlands (Dutch Top 100)	37
New Zealand (Recorded Music NZ)	11
Scottish Singles Sales (Official Charts)	25
UK Singles (Official Charts)	14
UK Dance (Official Charts)	12
UK Hip Hop/R&B (Official Charts)	2
UK Airplay (Music Week)	29
UK Club Chart (Music Week)	5
US Billboard Hot 100 with "70's Love Groove"	8
US Dance Club Songs (Billboard)	9
US Hot R&B/Hip-Hop Songs (Billboard) with "70's Love Groove"	9
US Maxi-Singles Sales (Billboard)	9
US Pop Airplay (Billboard)	10
US Rhythmic Airplay (Billboard)	6
US Cash Box Top 100	6

=== Year-end charts ===
Year-end chart (1995)	Position
US Billboard Hot 100	64

== Certifications ==
Region	Certification	Certified units/sales
United States (RIAA)	Gold	500,000^{^}
^{^} Shipments figures based on certification alone.
