= Whoops Now / What'll I Do =

1995 double A-side single by Janet Jackson

"Whoops Now" / "What'll I Do"

Single by Janet Jackson

from the album Janet
- B-side: "The Body That Loves You"
- Released: January 30, 1995 ("What'll I Do"); March 6, 1995 ("Whoops Now")
- Length: 4:59 ("Whoops Now" album version); 3:42 ("Whoops Now" radio edit); 4:05 ("What'll I Do")
- Label: Virgin
- Songwriters: Jimmy Jam and Terry Lewis; Janet Jackson; Steve Cropper; Joe Shamwell
- Producers: Jimmy Jam and Terry Lewis; Janet Jackson

Janet Jackson singles chronology
"You Want This" (1994)	"Whoops Now" / "What'll I Do" (1995)	"Scream" (1995)

Music video
- "Whoops Now" on YouTube

"Whoops Now" and "What'll I Do" are two songs by American singer-songwriter Janet Jackson from her fifth studio album, Janet (1993). They were released as a double A-side single on March 6, 1995, by Virgin Records as the album's final single; in Australia, "What'll I Do" by itself was released earlier, on January 30. The songs reached number one in New Zealand and peaked within the top 20 in several countries. In Japan, only "What'll I Do" was released, while in Australia, both the double- and single A-side versions were issued.

== Background ==
"Whoops Now" and "What'll I Do" were released as a double A-side in Europe, Japan, and Oceania, whereas the latter was released on its own in Oceania as well as certain European markets. Both releases included janet.'s "The Body That Loves You" as a B-side. "Whoops Now" was added as a hidden track on the regular edition of janet. after the interlude "Sweet Dreams", while the UK and Japanese pressings of the album list the tracks separately. An edited version of the song also appears on the international version of Jackson's first greatest hits package, Design of a Decade: 1986–1996. The shorter version omits the risqué coda about activities in Anguilla. A remix of "What'll I Do" by Dave Navarro appears on Jackson's second remix album janet. Remixed.

"What'll I Do" is a cover of a Johnny Daye song called "What'll I Do for Satisfaction", which was released in 1967 and written by Joe Shamwell and Steve Cropper.

Jackson performed both songs on the janet. Tour, while she only performed "Whoops Now" on The Velvet Rope Tour. In 2024, over 25 years since it was last performed, "Whoops Now" was added to the encore of the Janet Jackson: Together Again tour for its final European leg.

== Critical reception ==
British magazine Music Week gave "Whoops Now" three out of five, adding that "this single has an uncharacteristic Motown feel to it and could zoom up the charts, helped by a cute accompanying video."

== Chart performance ==
The overall chart performances for the single was successful, charting inside the top ten in Austria, France, and the United Kingdom, and inside the top twenty in Australia (for "What'll I Do"; "Whoops Now" peaked at number forty-nine), Denmark, Germany, and Switzerland. "Whoops Now/What'll I Do" managed to peak at number one in New Zealand for one week.

== Music video ==
The accompanying music video for "Whoops Now" was directed by Yuri Elizondo, the younger brother of Jackson's then-husband, René Elizondo Jr., and depicts Jackson and her friends having fun in Jackson's favorite vacation spot, Anguilla. It appears on the video compilation Design of a Decade 1986/1996. The video for "What'll I Do" is a concert performance taken from the janet. Tour, and has never been released commercially.

== Track listings ==
- UK CD single (VSCDT1533)
- UK 12-inch single (VSTY 1533)
- Dutch CD single (VSCDT 1533)
- Australian CD single (892845.2)
1. "Whoops Now" (radio edit) – 3:42
2. "What'll I Do" – 4:05
3. "What'll I Do" (Dave Navarro remix) – 4:20
4. "The Body That Loves You" – 5:33
- UK 7-inch single (VSY1533) (limited edition picture disc)
1. "Whoops Now" (radio edit) – 3:42
2. "What'll I Do" – 4:05
- Australian CD single (892797.2)
1. "What'll I Do" – 4:05
2. "That's the Way Love Goes" (We Aimsta Win mix 1) – 5:42
- Japanese 3-inch CD single (VJDP-10242)
1. "What'll I Do" (Dave Navarro remix) – 4:20
2. "The Body That Loves You" – 5:33

== Charts ==
=== "Whoops Now" / "What'll I Do" ===
Chart (1995)	Peak position
Australia (ARIA)	49
Austria (Ö3 Austria Top 40)	7
Belgium (Ultratop 50 Flanders)	35
Belgium (Ultratop 50 Wallonia)	7
Europe (European Hot 100)	12
Europe (European Dance Radio)	23
Europe (European Hit Radio)	4
France (SNEP)	5
Germany (GfK)	11
Iceland (Íslenski Listinn Topp 40)	33
Ireland (IRMA)	16
Israel (Israeli Singles Chart)	25
Netherlands (Dutch Top 40 Tipparade)	4
Netherlands (Single Top 100)	38
New Zealand (Recorded Music NZ)	1
Poland Airplay (Music & Media)	7
Scottish Singles Sales (Official Charts)	10
Switzerland (Schweizer Hitparade)	15
UK Singles (Official Charts)	9
UK Hip Hop/R&B (Official Charts)	2
UK Airplay (Music Week)	3

=== "What'll I Do" ===
Chart (1995)	Peak position
Australia (ARIA)	14
Europe (European Dance Radio)	24

=== Year-end charts ===
Chart (1995)	Position
Belgium (Ultratop 50 Wallonia)	32
Europe (European Hot 100)	58
Europe (European Hit Radio)	17
France (SNEP)	40
Germany (Media Control)	65
New Zealand (RIANZ)	27
Switzerland (Schweizer Hitparade)	45
UK Singles (OCC)	95
UK Airplay (Music Week)	34

== Certifications ==
Region	Certification	Certified units/sales
France (SNEP)	Gold	250,000^{*}
^{*} Sales figures based on certification alone.

== Release history ==
Region	Version	Date	Format(s)	Label(s)	Ref.
Australia	"What'll I Do"	January 30, 1995	CD; cassette	Virgin	
United Kingdom	"Whoops Now" / "What'll I Do"	March 6, 1995	7-inch vinyl; 12-inch vinyl; CD; cassette	Virgin	
Australia	"Whoops Now" / "What'll I Do"	April 3, 1995	CD; cassette	Virgin	
Japan	"What'll I Do"	April 8, 1995	Mini-CD	Virgin	
