= Dancin' Man =

Single by Q

from the album Dancin' Man
- B-side: "Love Pollution"
- Released: March 1977
- Recorded: 1977
- Genre: R&B, Disco
- Length: 2:38
- Label: Epic
- Songwriter: Rob Peckman

Q singles chronology
| "Dancin' Man" (1977) | "Sweet Summertime" (1977) |

"Dancin' Man" is a song by disco group Q, written by Rob Peckman. It reached the Top 40 of the Billboard Hot 100, and received substantial play in the American Southeast.

== Release ==
"Dancin' Man" was released by Epic Records in Spring 1977. The song's B-side was titled "Love Pollution." To promote the song, Epic Records took out a full-page advertisement in the April 23, 1977 issue of Billboard magazine, urging DJs and radio stations to put the song into rotation.

== Airplay ==
The song went into rotation on many Southeast American radio stations, including:

- WQXI (Atlanta)
- WBBQ (Atlanta)
- WBJW-FM (Orlando)
- WMFJ (Daytona Beach).

The song also received play on:

- KCPX (Salt Lake City)
- WTRY (Albany)
- KTNQ (Los Angeles).

== Charts ==
The song was a Top 40 hit on the Billboard Hot 100 (where it reached number 23), the Cashbox Singles chart (#20), and the Record World chart. In Canada, "Dancin' Man" reached #19.

== Chart history ==
=== Weekly charts ===
| Chart (1977) | Peak position |
|---|---|
| Canada RPM Top Singles | 19 |
| U.S. Billboard Hot 100 | 23 |
| U.S. Cash Box Top 100 | 20 |
| U.S. Record World | 20 |

=== Year-end charts ===
| Chart (1977) | Rank |
|---|---|
| Canada | 152 |
| US (Joel Whitburn's Pop Annual) | 144 |
