= Janet (album) =

1993 studio album by Janet Jackson

Studio album by Janet Jackson
- Released: May 18, 1993
- Recorded: September 1992 – February 1993
- Studio: Flyte Tyme (Edina, Minnesota)
- Genre: R&B
- Length: 75:23
- Label: Virgin
- Producers: Jimmy Jam and Terry Lewis; Janet Jackson; Jellybean Johnson

Janet Jackson chronology
Janet Jackson's Rhythm Nation 1814 (1989)	Janet (1993)	Janet Remixed (1995)

Singles from Janet
- 1. "That's the Way Love Goes" Released: April 14, 1993; 2. "If" Released: July 13, 1993; 3. "Again" Released: October 12, 1993; 4. "Because of Love" Released: January 10, 1994; 5. "Any Time, Any Place" Released: May 11, 1994; 6. "Throb" Released: June 18, 1994; 7. "You Want This" Released: October 11, 1994; 8. "What'll I Do" Released: January 30, 1995; 9. "Whoops Now" Released: March 6, 1995

Janet (stylized as janet.) is the fifth studio album by American singer Janet Jackson. It was released on May 18, 1993, by Virgin Records America. Prior to its release, Jackson was at the center of a high-profile bidding war over her recording contract. In 1991, her original label A&M sought to renew her contract, while others, such as Atlantic, Capitol, and Virgin all vied to sign her. After meeting with Virgin owner Richard Branson, she signed with the label. The contract was worth an estimated $40 million, making her the world's then-highest paid musical act. Janet marks Jackson's second eponymous record after her debut studio album, Janet Jackson (1982).

Its title, consisting of just her first name followed by a period, suggests a separation of her public image from the Jackson family and presents her as an independent artist. A R&B record, Janet incorporated pop, hip-hop, soul, funk, rock, house, jazz, and opera and moved away from the rigid, industrial sound of her previous records. Lyrically, the theme of Janet is sexual intimacy—an abrupt departure from her conservative image.

In the United States, Janet became the singer's third consecutive album to top the Billboard 200 and her first to debut at number one. Selling 350,000 copies in its first week, it set a record for the highest first-week sales for a female artist at that time. Certified sixfold platinum by the Recording Industry Association of America (RIAA), it has sold over seven million copies in the U.S. according to Nielsen SoundScan. Internationally, Janet topped the record charts in Australia, New Zealand, Canada, South Africa and the United Kingdom, and has sold an estimated 14 million copies worldwide.

Janet produced six top-ten hits on the U.S. Billboard Hot 100 chart, including the number-one singles "That's the Way Love Goes" and "Again". The MTV-sponsored Janet World Tour, which supported the album, received critical acclaim for Jackson's elaborate stage performances, reinforcing her reputation as one of the preeminent artists of the MTV generation. Janet cemented her as an international icon and sex symbol, and is listed by the National Association of Recording Merchandisers and the Rock and Roll Hall of Fame as one of the 200 Definitive Albums of All Time. Academics have argued that the erotic imagery in her music videos has contributed to a higher degree of sexual freedom among women in popular music.

== Background ==
Rumors of a multimillion-dollar bidding war over Jackson's recording contract began to circulate in spring 1991. Jet magazine reported: "A recording company has offered in excess of $50 million to sign superstar Janet Jackson to a recording contract, making the 24-year-old singer/songwriter/dancer/actress the key player in one of the hottest bidding wars among today's major record companies." Reports indicated that Capitol, Virgin, and Atlantic were all bidding for Jackson's contract, as her ties to A&M would soon expire; by March, she had signed with Virgin. The New York Times declared "Janet Jackson has signed what is believed to be the most lucrative contract in the history of recording. The 24-year-old singer, songwriter and actress signed an exclusive contract with Virgin Records it was announced yesterday." Her new contract guaranteed a 22 percent royalty payment, in addition to her then-historic signing bonus. Chuck Philips of the Los Angeles Times reported that it had been the largest bidding war in recent memory and that "[o]ne reason the bidding was so heavy, various industry observers have noted, was that Jackson-at just 24-is still a relatively fresh face on the pop scene and that her dance-pop style is ideal for today's pop/video climate." In addition, her potential as an international superstar proved to be the primary motivation for the label's investment. Jeff Ayeroff, co-managing director of Virgin in the U.S., stated: "Janet is a world-class artist and we expect her growth to be enormous." Chairman Richard Branson spoke with Jackson privately to seal the deal. He commented: "A Rembrandt rarely becomes available... When it does, there are many people who are determined to get it. I was determined."

Stephen Holden of The New York Times criticized the contract amount, considering it a gamble for Virgin. He stated that Jackson "is a producer-dependent artist—i.e., someone who relies on others to make her sound interesting and trendy. She also lacks a sharply defined personality, both as an artist and celebrity. Where singers like Ms. Houston and Mariah Carey have commanding vocal power, Ms. Jackson's is a relatively indistinguishable studio voice." Branson rebutted this argument, stating, "Ms. Jackson has met with great success working with the production team of Jimmy Jam and Terry Lewis, just as her brother Michael Jackson has experienced his greatest successes with the producer Quincy Jones. It is interesting that Mr. Holden doesn't mention this similar 'liability' when discussing Michael Jackson. To say that Ms. Jackson is 'dependent' on her producer is a shortsighted observation. She is a formidable talent who stands on her own." Michael would break his sister's record only days later, when he signed a $60 million contract with Sony Music Entertainment. Both siblings' contracts garnered considerable criticism. Los Angeles Times reported that "A&M Records President Al Cafaro, whose company lost the fierce bidding battle over Janet Jackson to Virgin Records, said record companies may be vesting too much importance in individual performers" as the funds used as advances to the Jacksons could have launched recording careers for numerous unknown talents. Cliff Burnstein of Q-Prime management commented that recording artists' demands for advances upon signing would begin to escalate from that point forward.

Prior to her first release with Virgin, Jackson was asked by Jam and Lewis to record a song for the soundtrack to the feature film Mo' Money, released in 1992 by their label Perspective Records. Jon Bream of the Star Tribune reported: "For most movie soundtracks, producers negotiate with record companies, managers and lawyers for the services of big-name singers. Like the Hollywood outsiders that they are, Edina-based Jam and Lewis went directly to such stars as Janet Jackson, Luther Vandross, Bell Biv DeVoe, Color Me Badd and Johnny Gill." Jackson and Vandross recorded the duet "The Best Things in Life Are Free" featuring Bell Biv DeVoe and Ralph Tresvant, which peaked at number 10 on the Billboard Hot 100 and topped the Hot R&B Singles chart. Shortly afterward, Jackson began filming for her first feature-length role in John Singleton's Poetic Justice. Although she was encouraged by a major studio executive to take on a film in which she could portray a singer, she insisted on finding a different role. She explained: "About that same time John Singleton asked me to read his new script. John and I became buddies—I loved Boyz n the Hood—so I thought he was just asking my advice. I was shocked and honored to learn the screenplay had been written with me in mind. 'Would you play Justice?' he wanted to know. Yes! I'd finally found a role—a dramatic nonsinging role—that was right." Released in July 1993, Poetic Justice debuted at number one at the box office, grossing $11,728,455; it eventually grossed $27,515,786.

== Conception and titling ==
Sex isn't just fire and heat, it's natural beauty. Doing what comes naturally. It's letting go, giving and getting what you need. In the age of AIDS, it certainly requires being responsible. On a psychological level, though, good sex, satisfying sex, is also linked with losing yourself, releasing, using your body to get out of your body. Well, for the first time, I'm feeling free. I love feeling deeply sexual—and don't mind letting the world know. For me, sex has become a celebration, a joyful part of the creative process.

— Janet Jackson, Rolling Stone, 1993

After writing songs with themes of independence for Control and social injustice for Rhythm Nation 1814, Jackson desired to devote her new album to love and relationships, describing the theme of her new album as "intimacy" and that "[s]exual communication is the name of the game." She stated in an interview with David Wild for Rolling Stone that "[w]hile I was doing Rhythm Nation, I was thinking about how things were so hard, so regimented and so black and white ... I thought I'd do something on the sexy side—which is hard for me since I grew up as a tomboy and don't really think of myself that way. But I think this album is more on the feminine tip." She also commented on how her experience acting in Poetic Justice played a role in taking a new direction with her music. Speaking with biographer David Ritz, she stated that "Rhythm Nation was a heavy record, and Poetic Justice was a heavy movie. I wanted to do something lighter but also daring ... When I wrote the album, I was still in a poetic frame of mind, inspired by Maya's beautiful language. You can hear that inspiration in the interludes and especially on the song 'New Agenda'. This time I felt much freer expressing myself."

Despite the critical and commercial success of her two previous albums, Jackson continued to receive numerous comparisons to her brother Michael, often with doubts that she held staying power in the music industry. When Edna Gundersen of USA Today questioned her about the subject, she responded: "Certain people feel I'm just riding on my last name ... That's why I just put my first name on janet. and why I never asked my brothers to write or produce music for me." Virgin Records expressed the album title "punctuates the declaration of strength the singer, songwriter and producer boldly expresses on this moving collection of songs which explore love, sensuality, the power of sisterhood and her own evolving self-identity." Thomas Harrison, author of Music of the 1990s (2011) wrote that "[t]he conscious decision was made, by the company and/or Jackson, to put her into the same league as other one-named artists, such as Madonna, Bono, Beyoncé and Prince, or at least to put her on the same standing as others in the industry who are often called by one name, such as Whitney, Mariah, Britney, Diana, Dolly, and Garth among others. Jackson could now, in a sense, stand on her own and not be seen as a product of the family entertainment machine." Sal Cinquemani of Slant Magazine wrote that the album title ultimately "announced the singer as completely independent of her male-dominated family [and] it positioned her as the person in charge of her sound."

== Production ==
The album was recorded at Flyte Tyme Studios in Edina, Minnesota, from September 1992 to February 1993. Songs on the album, except "What'll I Do", were written by Janet Jackson, Jimmy Jam and Terry Lewis, and mixed by Steve Hodge and Dave Rideau; "What'll I Do" was written and produced by Jackson and Jellybean Johnson. Jackson took a larger role in songwriting and production than she had on her previous albums. She explained that "[a]ll my records are personal, and janet, is the most personal of them all. That's why this time around it was important for me to write all the lyrics and half of the melodies." Jam described the record as being "a more mature album musically." David Ritz noted that Jackson and her producers took risks by experimenting with musical influences that had not appeared in their previous work. He explained: "She asked Kathleen Battle and Public Enemy's Chuck D to contribute—an opera diva and a hardcore rapper, two artists one would not associate with Janet—and somehow pulled it off. Beyond Jam and Lewis, there's now a recognizable Janet Jackson production style that's gutsy and, in some cases, even eccentric."

"That's The Way Love Goes" contains a sample loop of "Papa Don't Take No Mess" written by James Brown, Fred Wesley, Charles Bobbit, and John Starks. The song "Again", was originally just an experimental sound the production duo was considering. While Jackson found its melody compelling, the trio did not seriously consider the song until the film producers from Poetic Justice requested a ballad for the film's soundtrack. Jackson subsequently wrote the lyrics for "Again" and adapted them to Jam's melody. The song was arranged by Lee Blaskey and accompanied by members of the Minnesota Orchestra and the St. Paul Chamber Orchestra.

janet. features eclectic production choices. The record incorporates R&B ("That's the Way Love Goes", "Where Are You Now", "The Body That Loves You", "Any Time, Any Place"), new jack swing ("You Want This", "Because of Love"), rock ("If", "What'll I Do"), opera ("This Time"), house ("Throb"), jazz ("Funky Big Band"), hip-hop ("New Agenda"), and pop ("Again", "Whoops Now"). The album expanded Jackson's musical endeavors from the more electronic-based soundscapes of her prior albums. Like its immediate predecessor, janet. features a number of interludes between songs that vary from short conversations, instrumentals, and ambient-based tracks.

== Release and promotion ==
=== Rolling Stone cover ===
In September 1993, Jackson appeared topless on the cover of Rolling Stone magazine with the hands of her then-husband René Elizondo Jr. covering her breasts. The photograph is the original full-length version of the cropped image used on the cover of the Janet album, shot by Patrick Demarchelier. In the cover story, "Sexual Healing" by David Ritz, Jackson explained, "sex has been an important part of me for several years. But it just hasn't blossomed publicly until now. I've had to go through some changes and shed some old attitudes before feeling completely comfortable with my body. Listening to my new record, people intuitively understand the change in me". Ritz likened Jackson's transformation to Marvin Gaye as he stated, "just as Gaye moved from What's Going On to Let's Get It On, from the austere to the ecstatic, Janet, every bit as serious-minded as Marvin, moved from Rhythm Nation to Janet, her statement of sexual liberation".

The image was cropped to show only Jackson's face on the album cover, and her midriff in the interior booklet. The full version appears as the cover of the limited edition double-disc edition of the album, as well as the video compilation Janet released later that year. Sonia Murray of the Vancouver Sun later reported, "Jackson, 27, remains clearly established as both role model and sex symbol; the Rolling Stone photograph of Jackson ... became one of the most recognizable, and most lampooned, magazine covers of the year".

=== Singles ===
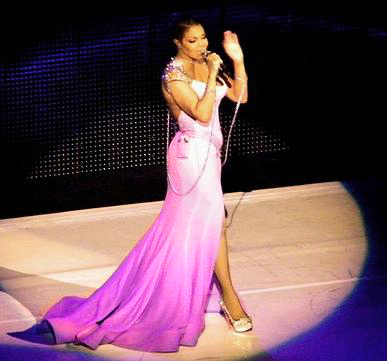
Jackson performing the album's third single, "Again", during her Number Ones, Up Close and Personal tour (2011).

"That's the Way Love Goes", the album's lead single entered the Billboard Hot 100 at number fourteen and peaked at number one. The single was certified gold by the RIAA on November 12, 1993. Virgin Records intended for "If" to be the lead single for the album, but Jackson, Jam and Lewis disagreed. "That's the Way Love Goes" remained at number one for eight weeks—the most successful chart performance of any member of the Jackson family. The single earned a Grammy Award for Best R&B Song. "If" was released as the album's second single and peaked at number four on the Hot 100, receiving gold certification on September 28, 1993. To promote the album, Jackson performed a medley of the first two singles at the 1993 MTV Video Music Awards. "Again" peaked at number one on the Hot 100 on December 11, 1993, and topped the chart for two weeks. The single was certified gold and then doubled to platinum by the RIAA on December 17, 1993. The single earned a nomination at the 66th Academy Awards for Best Original Song, where she also performed the track. "Because of Love" reached number ten, but was not certified by the RIAA. "Any Time, Any Place" peaked at number two on the Hot 100 and was certified gold on July 11, 1994. "You Want This", the album's final commercial single for the United States, peaked at number eight on the Hot 100 and was awarded gold certification on December 6, 1994. The album's hidden track "Whoops Now" was released as a single in selected territories in 1995.

The album's popularity at the time of its release made it one of the first instances in which album tracks charted before being released as singles. "Throb", which would eventually be released as a B-side to "Any Time, Any Place" in June 1994, charted an entire year before due to unsolicited radio airplay, reaching number 66 on the Radio Songs Chart. Similarly, the album cut "Where Are You Now" reached number 30 on the same chart, remaining on the chart for 37 weeks. Bonus track "One More Chance" also received unsolicited airplay toward the end of the album's rollout.

Jackson's music video for "If" was staged as a futuristic Asian nightclub, with spy cameras monitoring the intimate interactions of patrons within their private boudoirs. The video is an elaborate metaphor for the single's message of sexual fantasy, desire and voyeurism. The video was directed by Dominic Sena, who previously worked with Jackson on music videos for Rhythm Nation 1814. René Elizondo Jr. directed the videos for "That's The Way Love Goes", and "Again". Videos for "Any Time, Any Place" and "You Want This" were directed by Keir McFarlane.

A video compilation was released on VHS and LaserDisc on November 3, 1994, which includes the videos and alternate cuts for "That's the Way Love Goes", "If", "Again", "Any Time, Any Place" and "You Want This".

=== Janet World Tour ===
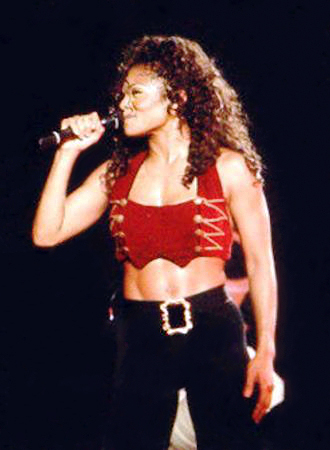
Jackson performing during one of the dates of the Janet World Tour

Jackson embarked on her second world tour in support of her first album for Virgin Records. Costumes and wardrobe for the tour were designed by stylist Tanya Gill, with outfits "rang[ing] from pipebone vests with high-heeled moccasin boots to zoot suits top-hats to circus-ringmaster bustiers." With a show encompassing over 100 costumes, a team of over 50 costume makers was led by wardrobe supervisor, Helen Hiatt. The tour's debut concert was held on November 24, 1993, in Cincinnati, Ohio. Jackson held a four-show engagement at Madison Square Garden which began on December 17, 1993, with the final performance held on New Year's Eve. Michael Snyder of the San Francisco Chronicle described Jackson's stage performance at the San Jose Arena in February 1994, as what erased the line between "stadium-size pop music concerts and full-scale theatrical extravaganzas".

The one-hour-and-45-minute performance was so tightly choreographed—down to two built-in pauses for "tears" at overwhelming waves of crowd adoration and a contrived bit of seductive repartee with a handsome, buffed hunk plucked from the front row for the ode to lust, "Any Time, Any Place"—that it breezed by like a glitzy Vegas revue or a television variety show.

— Michael Snyder, San Francisco Chronicle

Her performances also drew criticism. Renee Graham of The Boston Globe commented that her stage show at Great Woods Center for the Performing Arts on June 20, 1994, proved her limited vocal range as "[t]he numerous costume changes, pyrotechnics and the dancing all but overshadowed her razor-sharp seven-piece band and three backup singers", asserting Jackson was a better performer and entertainer than she was a vocalist. However, the St. Louis Post-Dispatch's Steve Pick observed Jackson's stage show at the Riverport Amphitheatre on July 12, 1994, enhanced the Janet album's numerous hit singles through her "larger-than-life stage persona".

== Critical reception ==
Professional ratings
Initial reviews (in 1993)
Review scores
Source	Rating
Christgau's Consumer Guide	A−
Entertainment Weekly	C+
Los Angeles Times	2.5/4 stars
Music Week	5/5 stars
NME	8/10
Q	2/5 stars
Rolling Stone	4/5 stars
Select	3/5 medals

Professional ratings
Retrospective reviews (after 1993)
Review scores
Source	Rating
AllMusic	4/5 stars
Encyclopedia of Popular Music	4/5 stars
Slant Magazine	3.5/5 stars

Rolling Stone magazine declared "[a]s princess of America's black royal family, everything Janet Jackson does is important. Whether proclaiming herself in charge of her life, as she did on Control (1986), or commander in chief of a rhythm army dancing to fight society's problems (Rhythm Nation 1814, from 1989), she's influential. And when she announces her sexual maturity, as she does on her new album, Janet, it's a cultural moment." The magazine said the album should earn her critical praise and concluded its review by stating "[t]he princess of America's black royal family has announced herself sexually mature and surrendered none of her crown's luster in the process. Black women and their friends, lovers and children have a victory in Janet." Robert Christgau originally gave the album an "honorable mention" in his consumer guide for The Village Voice, in which he complimented its erotic songs and cited "Funky Big Band", "Throb", and "Be a Good Boy" as highlights. Billboard magazine gave a positive review, stating "[d]estined to be an instant smash, Ms. Jackson's latest is a glamorous assortment of styles—pop, dance, R&B, rock, jazz, rap—each delivered with consummate skill and passion. Janet is described as "a career-defining record earning Janet the right to operate on a first-name basis."

Michael Snyder of the San Francisco Chronicle lauded the album's content, stating "[t]his 75-minute opus, her first effort under a megabuck contract with the Virgin label, could be the make-out album of the '90s ... a silken soul odyssey, charting one woman's journey to emotional and sexual fulfillment through 10 songs and a series of spoken-word and ambient snippets." Caroline Sullivan of The Guardian declared the album's "luxuriant collection of house, soul and pop is her best yet. Cod-Madonna throwaways like 'Throb' aside, there are surprises all over the place. Public Enemy's Chuck D counterweights Jackson's sugared vocal to stunning effect on a black-pride anthem, 'New Agenda'; soprano Kathleen Battle turns the heavyweight funk of 'This Time' into something eerie and beautiful."

Robert Johnson of San Antonio Express-News praised Jackson and her producers for taking a chance on a new sound. He wrote: "Under the enormous pressure of her $40 million deal with Virgin Records, Jackson had to deliver something big enough to put her on a first-name basis with the world ... janet. isn't perfect, but it should be enough to make her the Queen of Pop." "Dammit, Janet!", marveled Melody Maker. "The last Jackson hero(ine) has carried peacock feathers to the dance. Holier than Mahalia." "Janet will please most people," remarked The Daily Telegraph, "because it is crammed with the sort of tender, joyous pop music that lingers long after smarter records have been forgotten."

Steve Pick of St. Louis Post-Dispatch stated that although Jackson may not be the greatest singer or songwriter, but she has nonetheless "created and projected a persona that is irresistible. Part of it is a sexual allure, but more of it is the way she demands and receives attention." John Mackie with the Vancouver Sun reported the album gave Jackson an "incredible style", proclaiming Janet as "the best commercial album so far this year, an album that could well vault her past the stumbling Madonna as Queen of the charts. Heck, she might even outsell Michael with this one." "While her brother loops the loop on Planet Pepsi, it's hard to imagine the spotlight ever shifting to his sassy sis," remarked NME, "but this modern hunk of an album should redress some of the balance."

Jay Cocks of Time magazine offered a mixed review, stating "[f]or all its sass, there is something a little too careful about this album: the rhythms are too studied and studiobound, the sexiness slightly forced. It's as if Jackson, aware that this was her premier effort under a new, $40 million record deal, felt weighed down by the burden of proving herself. When, however, she kicks loose on 'What'll I Do', a nifty, '60s-style soul stirrer, it's clear that Jackson's got nothing to prove to anyone, including herself." Jon Pareles of The New York Times compared Jackson with her brother Michael and Madonna, stating "Jackson's real strength, abetted by Jam and Lewis, is the way she tops dance-club rhythms with pop melodies. Less up-to-the-second than Madonna but still effective, the Jackson team has obviously been listening to the competition. Madonna's 'Justify My Love' echoes in 'That's the Way Love Goes', and 'If' resembles Michael Jackson's 'Why You Wanna Trip on Me', starting with screaming guitar and a chanted verse, rising to a sweet melody." He also commented that despite its shortcomings, "[t]he album's not about being real; it's about seamlessness and ingenuity, about giving the public something it can use. For a superstar, Jackson is downright selfless, but she gets the job done."

Chris Willman of the Los Angeles Times gave an unfavorable review. Although sex was already a common theme in popular music, Willman argued that the album would draw attention mainly because of Jackson's well-known conservative image. He wrote: "So be it. Jackson's first album in four years is destined for a long ride at No. 1, not because it's any great piece of work, but largely for its aphrodisiacal aspirations." David Browne of Entertainment Weekly stated that "[i]f musical variety and daring lyrics were all that mattered, Janet would make the grade. But the album has a lot to prove. It is the first delivery under her $40 million contract with Virgin, and its title—which translates as 'Janet, period'—is meant as a declaration of independence from her oddball siblings ... She still sounds like a young woman from a male-dominated family who is searching for her identity and voice. Mostly, though, Janet sounds like a mess—period." David Sinclair of The Times wrote: "In the steamy, post-Madonna climate of the 1990s, Jackson is not about to let thoughts of love get in the way of the mechanics of lust, and like many of her superstar contemporaries she tends to confuse sex with soul."

=== Accolades ===
Jackson received five nominations for the 1994 American Music Awards: Favorite Pop/Rock Female Artist, Favorite Soul/R&B Female Artist, Favorite Pop/Rock Album and Favorite Soul/R&B Album for Janet, and Favorite Soul/R&B Single for "That's the Way Love Goes", but lost all the awards to Whitney Houston for The Bodyguard soundtrack. The same year she received two Grammy Award nominations—Best R&B Vocal Performance, Female and Best R&B Song for "That's The Way Love Goes"—winning Best R&B Song. Several critics asserted she was unjustly overlooked in the Grammys' three major categories: Record of the Year, Song of the Year and Album of the Year. Greg Kot of the Chicago Tribune stated, "Jackson again was denied a nomination for album of the year, even though janet (Virgin) has remained in the Top 10 since its release last summer and has been critically acclaimed." He adds that "the oversight is doubly vexing, because [Jackson]—in a songwriting and production partnership with Jimmy Jam (aka James Harris III) and Terry Lewis—is not just a multiplatinum pop act but an artist who has reshaped the sound and image of rhythm and blues over the last decade." Kot attributed the oversight to the fact that many believed her to be a producer-dependent artist—an opinion he found to be in error. Similarly, producer Jimmy Jam stated: "It's easy to say that the two albums she did before she met us weren't successful and when she got with us she became successful ... Control was the first album she actually had input. I think that's just as significant as the fact we (Jam and Lewis) did the record."

Organization	Country	Accolade	Year
Grammy Awards	United States	Grammy Award for Best R&B Song ("That's The Way Love Goes")	1994
Billboard Awards	United States	Dance Clip of the Year ("If")	1994
MTV Video Music Awards	United States	Best Female Video ("If")	1994
Soul Train Music Awards	United States	Video of the Year ("If")	1994
Rock and Roll Hall of Fame	United States	"The Definitive 200: Top 200 Albums of All-Time" (ranked 86)	2007
Rolling Stone	United States	"100 Greatest Albums of the Nineties" (ranked 58)	2010
Slant Magazine	United States	"Best Albums of the '90s" (ranked 78)	2011
Spin	United States	"The 300 Best Albums of the Past 30 Years (1985–2014)" (ranked 164)	2014
Pitchfork	United States	The 150 Best Albums of the 1990s (ranked 38)	2022

=== Retrospective reviews ===
Later reviews were generally positive. In a retrospective review, Christgau gave Janet an "A−" and said that although the costly production by Jam and Lewis makes the music sound "more pornographic than obscene", "this achievement is Janet's, period ... Better nose than Michael, better navel than Madonna, better sex than either." Laura Sinagra wrote in The Rolling Stone Album Guide (2004) that with janet, Jackson "took more risks" lyrically than on her previous albums. Sal Cinquemani of Slant Magazine notes that the album "was at the forefront of the increasingly popular sampling trend in the '90s, with one song even employing three different samples as its foundation. Some make perfect sense on a thematic as well as sonic level, like Kool & the Gang's 'Kool It (Here Comes the Fuzz)' and Stevie Wonder's 'Superwoman, Where Were You When I Needed You' on 'New Agenda', or the orchestral flourish from Diana Ross & the Supremes' 'Someday We'll Be Together' on 'If', which seems to exist for the sole purpose of providing the impetus behind one of the greatest dance-break routines in music video history." Commenting on the album's broad range, he states: "The mother of eclectic, genre-hopping records by Christina Aguilera, Gwen Stefani, and Fergie, janet. incorporates new jack swing, house, pop, rock, hip-hop, jazz, and even opera, but the album's range of styles isn't jarring in the least ... Janet has never been one thing and janet. is a feminist statement, to be sure." Alex Henderson of AllMusic offered a positive review, saying "[a]nyone who expected Jackson to top Rhythm Nation—her crowning achievement and an incredibly tough act to follow—was being unrealistic. But with janet., she delivered a respectable offering that, although not as strong as either Control or Nation, has many strong points."

== Commercial performance ==
Janet debuted at number one on the Billboard 200 and the Top R&B/Hip-Hop Albums charts. It was the first time a female artist debuted at number one since the start of the SoundScan era; setting the record for the largest first-week sales by a female artist at the time, with 350,000 units sold. The album also earned worldwide success, debuting at number one in the United Kingdom, New Zealand, and Australia. It also debuted in the top 10 in Sweden, the Netherlands, and Switzerland. In Germany the album peaked at number five and charted for 49 weeks, becoming Jackson's longest charting album.

Janet was first certified gold by the RIAA on August 8, 1993, denoting 500,000 units shipped within the United States. The same day, the album's certification was raised to 3× platinum, denoting 3,000,000 units shipped. On November 17, 1993, Janet received 4× platinum certification and was later awarded 5× platinum on December 17, 1993. The following year on April 12, 1994, the album was certified 6× platinum. It was the second best selling album of 1993 in United States with 4.3 million copies sold, behind The Bodyguard soundtrack and was the biggest selling album by a solo artist. Within seven months of release the album had sold over ten million copies worldwide. Other certifications include a Double Gold certification in France, a 2× Platinum certification in the UK And Australia, a Platinum in New Zealand and a Gold certification in Norway.

According to Nielsen SoundScan, the album has sold 7,035,000 million copies in the United States since its release, and also sold an additional 860,000 copies through BMG Music Club. With estimated worldwide sales of over 14 million copies, it is Jackson's best selling album.

== Legacy ==
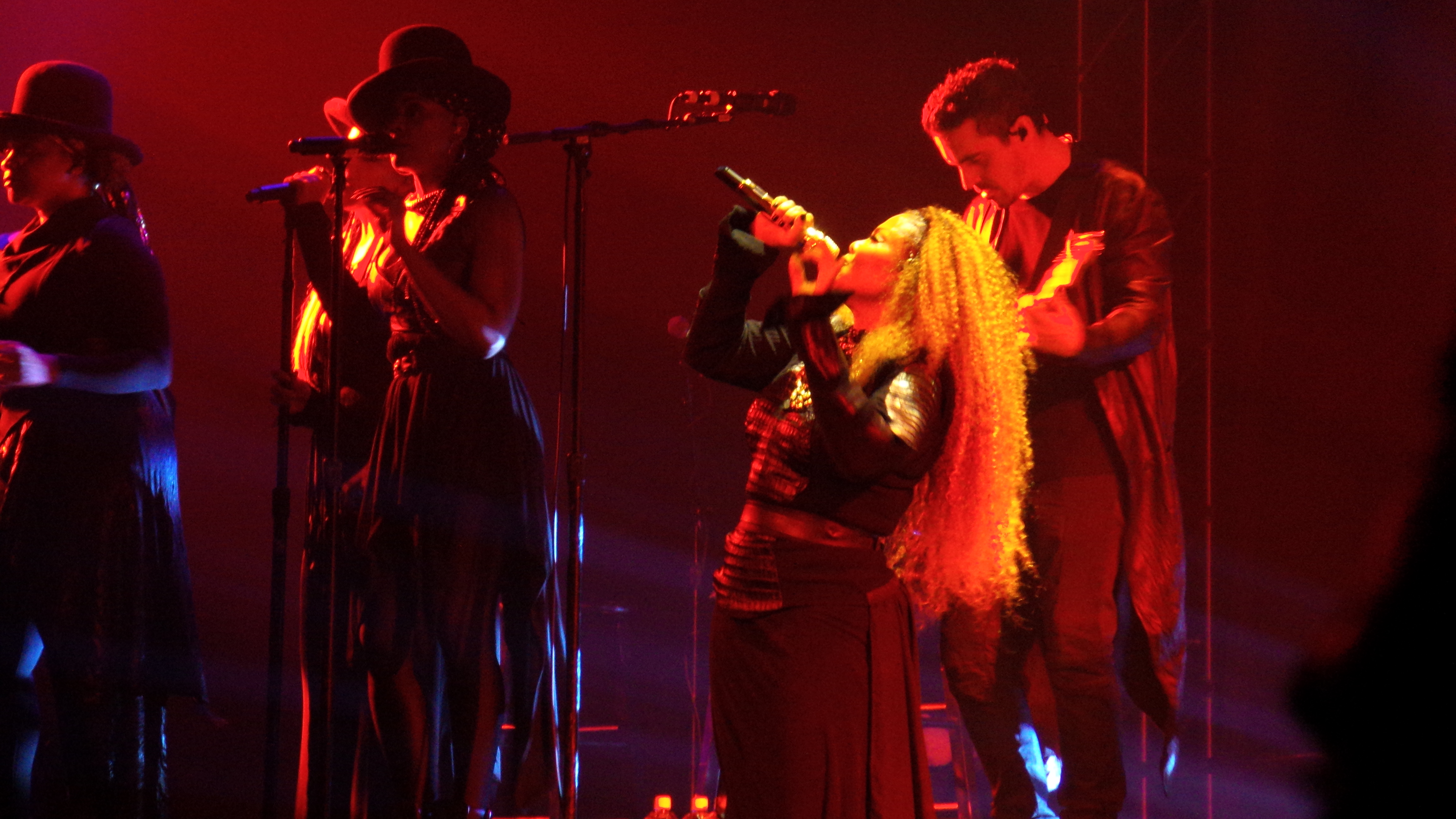
Jackson performing "That's the Way Love Goes" on her Unbreakable World Tour (2015–16).

Although Jackson had reached superstar status in the United States, she had yet to achieve the same level of response internationally. According to Nacy Berry, vice chairman of Virgin Records, Janet marked the first time the label "had centrally coordinated and strategized a campaign on a worldwide basis" which ultimately brought her to a plateau of global recognition. Her historic multimillion-dollar contract made her the highest-paid artist in history until her brother Michael renegotiated his contract with Sony Music Entertainment only days later. Sonia Murray noted that she remained "the highest-paid female in pop ... a whirlwind of fashion, personality and slick musical packaging rivaled only by Madonna and Whitney Houston in today's pop pantheon." James Robert Parish, author of Today's Black Hollywood (1995) wrote: "She confirmed her status as today's Queen of Pop when, not long ago, she signed a $35-$40 million recording contract with Virgin Records." Music critic Nelson George noted that while surpassing Michael would be nearly impossible, Janet had assuredly reached iconic status. He explained: "What worked for Michael 10 years ago is working for her now ... Michael was clearly the voice of the '80s, those that grew up with him since Motown. And with the themes (independence, social consciousness and up-front yet responsible sexuality) that she's addressing in her albums and the popularity she's enjoying, she could very well be the voice of the '90s."

Rolling Stone's The '90s: The Inside Stories from the Decade That Rocked (2010) documented that she had achieved some level of growth with each of her records, and that with Janet, "[u]sing soul, rock and dance elements, as well as opera diva Kathleen Battle, [she] unleashed her most musically ambitious record, guided as always, by producers Jimmy Jam and Terry Lewis." Richard J. Ripani, author of The New Blue Music: Changes in Rhythm & Blues, 1950–1999 (2006) noted that she had led the incorporation of rap into mainstream R&B with a select group of artists, in that "rap music no longer sounded so musically distant to many R&B listeners because many of its traits were commonly heard in songs by mainstream artists such as Janet Jackson, Mary J. Blige, Keith Sweat, and others." Vibe magazine observed that "R&B was omnipresent in 1993. It was a year in which Janet Jackson, at 27, topped the Billboard pop album charts for six straight summer weeks, with her critically lauded, six-times-platinum Janet" It joined Whitney Houston's Whitney as one of only two albums in the history of the Billboard 200 to debut at number one and remain at the top of the chart for a minimum of six consecutive weeks.

The release of Janet signaled the singer's transformation from conservative teen role model into an adult sex symbol. In You've Come a Long Way, Baby: Women, Politics, and Popular Culture (1996), Lilly J. Goren observed that "[Her] 1993 album Janet moved away from politically driven lyrics to songs about love and sex, lyrics that could capitalize on her new sexy, more scantily clad image in MTV music videos. Jackson's evolution from politically aware musician to sexy diva marked the direction that society and the music industry were encouraging the dance-rock divas to pursue." Reporter Edna Gunderson commented: "The woman whose hourglass torso and sensual gyrating have made her MTV's reigning sex kitten is today a vision of wholesome beauty." Professor and social critic Camille Paglia expressed: "Janet's unique persona combines bold, brash power with quiet sensitivity and womanly mystery. Her latest music is lightning and moonglow."

Her music videos contributed to a higher degree of sexual freedom among young women, as Jean M. Twenge, author of Generation Me: Why Today's Young Americans Are More Confident, Assertive, Entitled—and More Miserable Than Ever Before (2007) wrote: "In Alfred Kinsey's studies in the 1950s, only 3% of the young women had received oral sex from a man. By the mid-1990s, however, 75% of women aged 18–24 had experienced cunnilingus. Music videos by female artists have contributed to the trend, with both Mary J. Blige and Janet Jackson heavily implying male-on-female oral sex in music videos by pushing down on a man's head until he's in exactly the right position." Similarly, Paula Kamen in Her Way: Young Women Remake the Sexual Revolution (2000) states that "[i]n the early to mid-1990s, oral sex even reached mainstream music as a politically charged demand of truly liberated women," citing TLC, Mary J. Blige and Janet Jackson as examples of female artists simulating cunnilingus in their videos. Rolling Stone wrote that "she celebrated becoming an erotic being ... [showing] young women a way to have their sexual freedom and their dignity, to have their cake and eat it too." She was named Best Female Singer and Female Sex Symbol by Rolling Stone for the year 1993 in pop music. Goren adds that later pop stars such as Britney Spears, Christina Aguilera and Pink would rely on image, sex appeal and choreography as much as musical talent.

== Track listing ==
All tracks written and produced by Janet Jackson, James Harris III and Terry Lewis, except where noted.

Standard edition
No.	Title	Writer(s)	Length
1.	"Morning"		0:31
2.	"That's the Way Love Goes"		4:24
3.	"You Know..."		0:12
4.	"You Want This"		5:05
5.	"Be a Good Boy..."		0:07
6.	"If"		4:31
7.	"Back"		0:04
8.	"This Time"		6:58
9.	"Go on Miss Janet"		0:05
10.	"Throb"		4:33
11.	"What'll I Do" (producers: Jackson, Jellybean Johnson)	Jackson; Steve Cropper; Joe Shamwell	4:05
12.	"The Lounge"		0:15
13.	"Funky Big Band"		5:22
14.	"Racism"		0:08
15.	"New Agenda"	Jackson; Harris III; Lewis; Chuck D	4:00
16.	"Love Pt. 2"		0:11
17.	"Because of Love"		4:20
18.	"Wind"		0:11
19.	"Again"		3:46
20.	"Another Lover"		0:11
21.	"Where Are You Now"		5:47
22.	"Hold on Baby"		0:12
23.	"The Body That Loves You"		5:32
24.	"Rain"		0:18
25.	"Any Time, Any Place"		7:08
26.	"Are You Still Up"		1:36
27.	"Sweet Dreams"		0:14
28.	"Whoops Now" (hidden track)	Jackson	4:59
Total length:			75:23

Special Oz Tour Limited Edition (bonus disc)
No.	Title	Writer(s)	Length
1.	"One More Chance"	Randy Jackson	5:57
2.	"Again" (Piano/Vocal)		3:51
3.	"And On and On"		4:52
4.	"70's Love Groove"		5:50
5.	"Throb" (David Morales Legendary Club Mix)		9:10

Limited edition (bonus disc)
No.	Title	Writer(s)	Length
1.	"That's the Way Love Goes/If" (1993 MTV Awards Medley)		5:48
2.	"That's the Way Love Goes" (We Aimsta Win Mix)		5:41
3.	"Again" (French Version)		3:53
4.	"If" (Swing Yo Pants Mix)		6:20
5.	"One More Chance"	R. Jackson	5:54
6.	"That's the Way Love Goes" (R&B Mix)		6:19
7.	"If" (Janet's Jeep Mix)		6:27
8.	"Again" (Piano/Vocal Mix)		3:48

2023 deluxe edition (bonus disc)
No.	Title	Writer(s)	Length
1.	"And On and On"		4:50
2.	"70's Love Groove"		5:47
3.	"One More Chance"	R. Jackson	5:54
4.	"You Want This" (Remix)		4:47
5.	"Where Are You Now" (Nellee Hooper Mix)		5:22
6.	"Because of Love" (Muggs 7" with Bass Intro)		3:32
7.	"That's The Way Love Goes" (CJ 7" R&B Mix)		4:10

1994 video compilation
No.	Title	Director(s)	Length
1.	"That's the Way Love Goes"	René Elizondo Jr.	3:34
2.	"If"	Dominic Sena	4:17
3.	"Again"	Elizondo	1:03
4.	"Any Time, Any Place"	Keir McFarlane	3:31
5.	"You Want This" (featuring MC Lyte)	McFarlane	4:38
6.	"That's the Way Love Goes" (one take version)	Elizondo	4:14
7.	"If" (all dance version)	Sena	6:42
8.	"Any Time, Any Place" (R. Kelly mix)	McFarlane	3:21
9.	"You Want This" (colorized version)	McFarlane	3:37

Notes

- "That's the Way Love Goes" contains:
  - samples from "Impeach the President" by The Honey Drippers, and "Papa Don't Take No Mess", written by James Brown, Fred Wesley, Charles Bobbit and John Starks and performed by James Brown.
  - an interpolation from "Georgy Porgy", performed by Toto and written by member David Paich.
- "You Want This" contains samples from:
  - "Love Child", written by R. Dean Taylor, Frank Wilson, Pam Sawyer, Deke Richards and performed by Diana Ross & the Supremes.
  - "Jungle Boogie", written by Robert Bell, Ronald Bell, Claydes Smith, Robert Mickens, Donald Boyce, Richard Allen Westfield, Dennis "Dee Tee" Thomas and George Brown and performed by Kool & the Gang.
- "If" contains samples from:
  - "Someday We'll Be Together", written by Johnny Bristol, Harvey Fuqua and Jackey Beavers and performed by Diana Ross & the Supremes.
  - "Honky-Tonk Haven", performed by John McLaughlin
- "New Agenda" contains samples from:
  - "School Boy Crush", written by Hamish Stuart, Onnie McIntyre, Alan Gorrie, Steve Ferrone, Molly Duncan and Roger Bell and performed by Average White Band.
  - "Kool It (Here Comes the Fuzz)", written by Gene Redd, Woodrow Sparrow, Robert Bell, Ronald Bell, Westfield, Mickens, G. Brown, Thomas and Smith and performed by Kool & the Gang.
  - "Superwoman (Where Were You When I Needed You)", written and performed by Stevie Wonder.
- "One More Chance" is a cover of the song of the same name, written by Randy Jackson and performed by the Jacksons.

== Personnel ==
- (Ex) Cat Heads – rap
- Alice Preves – viola
- Ann Nesby – background vocals
- Bernie Edstrom – horn arrangements, trumpet
- Carolyn Daws – violin
- Celine Leathead – violin
- Chuck D – rap
- Core Cotton – background vocals
- Daria Tedeschi – violin
- Dave Karr – flute
- David Barry – guitar
- David Bullock – violin
- David Carr – flute
- David Eiland – sax (alto)
- David Rideau – mixing
- Frank Stribbling – guitar
- Gary Raynor – bass
- Hanley Daws – violin
- Jamecia Bennett – background vocals
- Janet Jackson – main performer, record producer, vocals, background vocals
- Jean Krikorian – design
- Jeff Gottwig – clarinet, trumpet
- Jeff Taylor – bass, vocals, engineering
- Jellybean Johnson – producer
- Jimmy Jam – keyboards, producer, vocals
- James "Big Jim" Wright – keyboards, vocals
- Jossie Harris – talking
- Kathleen Battle – vocals
- Ken Holman – clarinet, sax (tenor)
- Laura Preves – bassoon
- Lawrence Waddell – organ (hammond)
- Lee Blaskey – orchestration
- Len Peltier – art direction, design
- Marie Graham – background vocals
- Mark Haynes – bass, drum programming, programming
- Merilee Klemp – oboe
- Mike Sobieski – violin
- Patrick Demarchelier – photography
- Robert Hallgrimson – sax (alto), trumpet
- Steve Hodge – mixing
- Steve Wright – trumpet
- Steven Pikal – trombone
- Stokley – drums
- Tamas Strasser – viola
- Terry Lewis – producer
- Tina Landon – talking
- Tom Kornacker – violin

== Charts ==
=== Weekly charts ===
Chart (1993–1995)	Peak position
Australian Albums (ARIA)	1
Austrian Albums (Ö3 Austria)	7
Belgian Albums (Ultratop)	6
Canada Top Albums/CDs (RPM)	1
Canadian Albums (The Record)	1
Dutch Albums (Album Top 100)	4
European Albums (Top 100)	3
Finland (Suomen virallinen albumilista)	7
French Albums (SNEP)	16
German Albums (Offizielle Top 100)	5
Greek Albums (Pop & Rock)	8
Hungarian Albums (MAHASZ)	7
Irish Albums (IFPI)	17
Italian Albums (Musica e dischi)	11
Japanese Albums (Oricon)	5
New Zealand Albums (RMNZ)	1
Norwegian Albums (VG-lista)	11
Scottish Albums (Official Charts)	44
Spanish Albums (AFYVE)	47
Swedish Albums (Sverigetopplistan)	5
Swiss Albums (Schweizer Hitparade)	10
UK Albums (Official Charts)	1
UK R&B Albums (Official Charts)	3
US Billboard 200	1
US Top R&B/Hip-Hop Albums (Billboard)	1

=== Year-end charts ===
Chart (1993)	Position
Australian Albums (ARIA)	25
Canadian Top Albums (RPM)	9
Dutch Albums (MegaCharts)	53
European Albums (Music & Media)	24
French Albums (SNEP)	19
Germany (Official German Charts)	27
Italian Albums (Musica e dischi)	63
Japanese Albums (Oricon)	73
New Zealand Albums (RMNZ)	26
Norwegian Skoleslutt Albums (VG-lista)	16
Swedish Albums (Sverigetopplistan)	37
Swiss Albums (Schweizer Hitparade)	31
UK Albums (OCC)	23
U.S. Billboard 200	4
U.S. Top R&B/Hip-Hop Albums (Billboard)	5
Chart (1994)	Position
Australian Albums (ARIA)	74
Canadian Albums Chart	54
U.S. Billboard 200	8
U.S. Top R&B/Hip-Hop Albums (Billboard)	15
Chart (1995)	Position
Australian Albums (ARIA)	80
New Zealand Albums Chart	45
U.S. Billboard 200	170

=== Decade-end charts ===
Chart (1990–1999)	Position
U.S. Billboard 200	31

=== All-time chart ===
Chart	Position
U.S. Billboard 200	119

== Certifications and sales ==
Region	Certification	Certified units/sales
Australia (ARIA)	2× Platinum	140,000^{^}
Belgium (BRMA)	Gold	25,000^{*}
Canada (Music Canada)	3× Platinum	300,000^{^}
France (SNEP)	2× Gold	200,000^{*}
Germany (BVMI)	Gold	250,000^{^}
Japan (RIAJ)	Platinum	200,000^{^}
Netherlands (NVPI)	Gold	50,000^{^}
New Zealand (RMNZ)	Platinum	15,000^{^}
Norway (IFPI Norway)	Gold	25,000^{*}
South Korea	—	80,000
Sweden (GLF)	Gold	50,000^{^}
Switzerland (IFPI Switzerland)	Gold	25,000^{^}
Taiwan	—	60,000
United Kingdom (BPI)	2× Platinum	600,000^{^}
United States (RIAA)	6× Platinum	7,895,000
Summaries
Worldwide	—	14,000,000
^{*} Sales figures based on certification alone.^{^} Shipments figures based on certification alone.

Certifications for Janet (video)
Region	Certification	Certified units/sales
United States (RIAA)	Gold	50,000^{^}
^{^} Shipments figures based on certification alone.

== See also ==
- List of best-selling albums by women

== Notes ==
a: Formerly titled "Hot R&B Singles", the chart is now known as "Hot R&B/Hip-Hop Songs"
