= Again (Janet Jackson song) =

1993 single by Janet Jackson

Single by Janet Jackson

from the album Janet
- B-side: "Funky Big Band"; "Again" (French version)
- Released: October 12, 1993
- Recorded: 1992
- Studio: Flyte Tyme (Edina, Minnesota)
- Genre: Pop
- Length: 3:47
- Label: Virgin
- Songwriters: Janet Jackson; James Harris III; Terry Lewis
- Producers: Jimmy Jam and Terry Lewis; Janet Jackson

Janet Jackson singles chronology
"If" (1993)	"Again" (1993)	"Because of Love" (1994)

Music video
- "Again" on YouTube

"Again" is a song by American singer and songwriter Janet Jackson from her fifth album, Janet (1993). The song was also included as the closing song to the 1993 film Poetic Justice. Written and produced by Jackson and Jimmy Jam and Terry Lewis, the ballad was released as the album's third single on October 12, 1993, by Virgin Records, and talks about the reconnection with an old lover. Originally an experimental sound Jam and Lewis was considered for the album, they did not give the song serious contemplation until the film producers from Poetic Justice requested a ballad for the soundtrack.

Critics were divided on their opinions of "Again". Some praised it as a highlight from the Janet album and a classic, while other critics responded negatively to its sentimental lyrical content. However, "Again" became a commercial success, topping the US Billboard Hot 100 for two weeks in late 1993 as well as the Cash Box Top 100, while also reaching the top 10 in Canada, Panama, Sweden and the United Kingdom.

"Again" received Golden Globe and Academy Award nominations for Best Original Song. Jackson's then-husband René Elizondo Jr. directed a music video for the song, which was released in two versions: one with and one without scenes from Poetic Justice. The song was covered by How to Dress Well for his second album, Total Loss and sampled by Iyaz on his 2010 single, "Solo".

== Background and recording ==
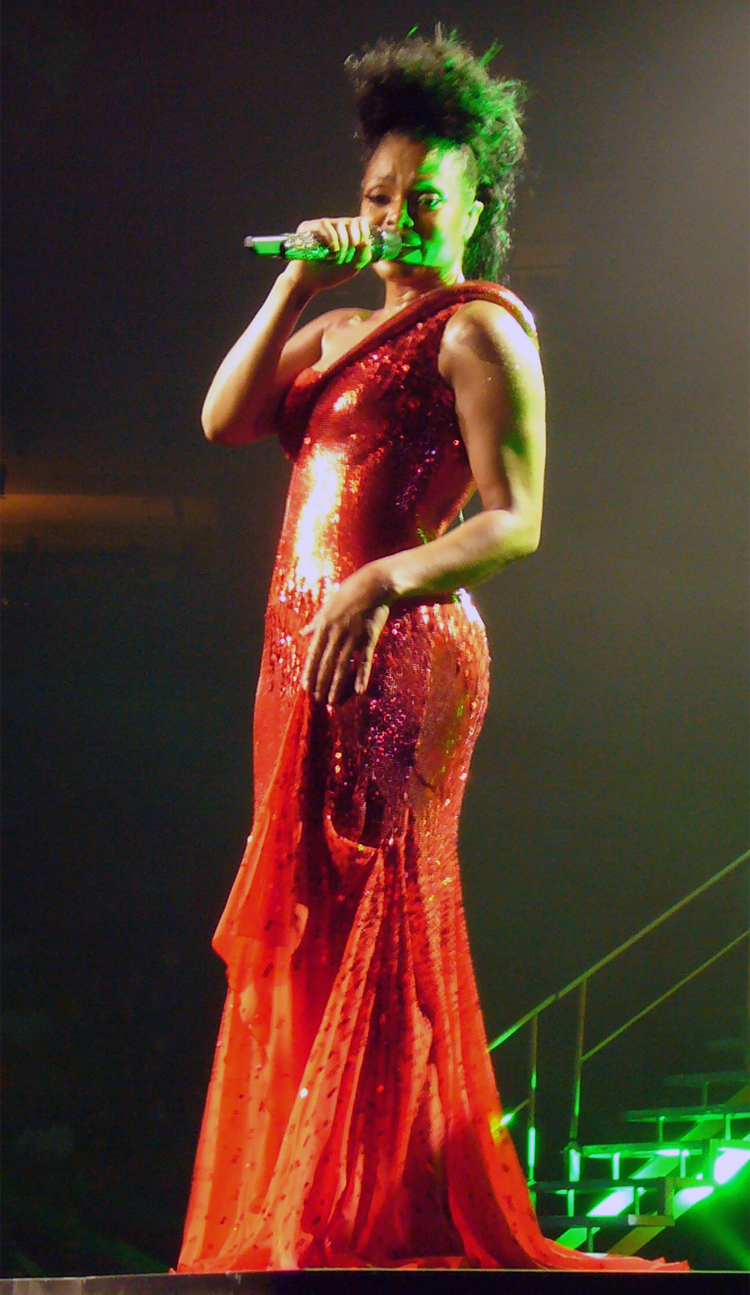
Jackson performing "Again" on the Rock Witchu Tour.

In 1992, Janet Jackson filmed her first film, Poetic Justice, prior to recording a new album. In Poetic Justice, Justice (Jackson) uses her poetry to deal with her grief after her boyfriend is killed in a shooting incident at a drive-in. After shooting the film, Jackson started recording a new album, declaring that the film inspired her to take new direction in her music, "Rhythm Nation was a heavy record, and Poetic Justice was a heavy movie. I wanted to do something lighter but also daring ... When I wrote the album, I was still in a poetic frame of mind, inspired by Maya's beautiful language."

"Again" was an experimental sound the production duo Jimmy Jam & Terry Lewis was considering for the album. While Jackson found its melody compelling, the trio did not give the song serious contemplation until the film producers from Poetic Justice requested a ballad for the film's soundtrack. Jackson subsequently wrote the lyrics for "Again" and shaped them around Jam's melody. The song was eventually included as the closing song to the film, but was not included on its soundtrack album. It was later released as janet.'s third single on October 12, 1993, with the jazz-funk track "Funky Big Band" from the album appearing on the single as a B-side, as well as a French version of the song, which also appeared on the limited edition of the janet. album. For this version, Janet Jackson is helped by André Manoukian.

== Composition and lyrics ==
"Again" was written and produced by Janet Jackson, Jimmy Jam & Terry Lewis. It is set in common time with a key of C major. Jackson's vocal cords ranges between the tonal nodes of low-tone G_{3} to high-tone D_{5}. The song is in a moderate tempo of 64 beats per minute with the chord progression being set like C–G–Am–F–C–Dm7/G in the first verse and C–E–Am7–D9 in the chorus. "Again" is a "lightweight" "Pop crossover" piano ballad, based on a lost love. The song's story is about running into an old friend, only to discover that the feelings for that person are as strong as ever. "Kinda late in the game and my heart is in your hands. Don't you stand there and then tell me you love me and leave me again," she sings.

== Critical reception ==
"Again" divided music critics. Despite calling it a "throwaway", Alex Henderson of AllMusic named the song a highlight from the album. Larry Flick from Billboard magazine called it "a delicate ballad". He added, "Her evocative voice is swathed in grand piano lines and quasi-orchestral strings that will thrill ardent fans at top 40 radio. Melancholy lyrics are icing on a sweet musical cake that millions will want to taste." In a "classic track-by-track review", another Billboard editor, Andrew Hampp, remarked, "By the time Jackson pleas at the song's close, seemingly choking back tears, "Cause I've fallen in love with you again," it's hard not to get misty even after countless listens." Essence ranked "Again" as the number-four Greatest Break-up song of all-time. John Martinucci from the Gavin Report described it as "a tender love song that definitely tugs on the heart strings." In his weekly UK chart commentary, James Masterton viewed it as "a slushy ballad". Alan Jones from Music Week gave it a score of four out of five and named it Single of the Week, stating that "this fragile and fragrant ballad draws a sophisticated vocal performance from Jackson. With full orchestral accompaniment, it is sweet but not saccharine, and is likely to grow into a huge hit." Sal Cinquemani of Slant Magazine called it "the most treacly, saccharine ballad Janet has ever recorded, complete with the kind of teary breakdown one might expect from her brother."

== Chart performance ==
"Again" was a success on the US Billboard Hot 100 chart, debuting in October 1993. The song topped the Billboard charts for two weeks in December 1993, being certified platinum by the Recording Industry Association of America. The song spent 15 weeks in the top 10, making it Jackson's longest running top-10 single. The song was also a number-one hit on the Cash Box Top 100 and a success on other Billboard component charts, including the Top 40 Mainstream (peaking at number two), the Rhythmic Top 40 (number three), Adult Contemporary (number four), and Hot R&B Singles & Tracks (number seven). In Canada, the song was also a success, reaching number two. In the United Kingdom, "Again" was a success, peaking at number six, becoming her sixth top-10 single.

Elsewhere, the song peaked inside the top 20. In Australia, "Again" debuted at number 26, before peaking at number 19, four weeks later. In New Zealand, the song was even better, peaking at number 13, while in Sweden, the song was even higher, with a peak of number five after 11 weeks on the chart, becoming her highest charting-single there.

== Music video ==
The accompanying music video for "Again" was directed by Jackson's then-husband René Elizondo Jr. in 1993. It features actor Gary Dourdan as Jackson's lost love, with Jackson writing in her diary as she reminisces about her love through flashbacks. The alternative version of the video contains scenes from Poetic Justice playing on a television. The original video appears on the 1994 compilation janet. and the 2004 DVD From Janet to Damita Jo: The Videos, while the Poetic Justice version is included on the 2001 DVD edition of All for You. "Again" was later made available by VEVO on YouTube in 2010, and had generated almost seven million views as of early 2024 on the platform.

== Live performances ==
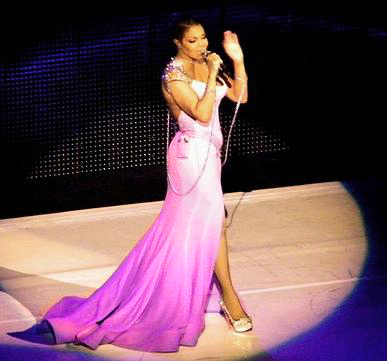
Jackson performing "Again" on the Number Ones, Up Close and Personal Tour.

Since its release, Jackson has performed the song on all of her tours, including the janet. Tour, The Velvet Rope Tour, All for You Tour, Rock Witchu Tour, and the Number Ones, Up Close and Personal tour, where it was dedicated to Phoenix, Arizona and Oslo, Norway. She also performed it on the season 9 finale of American Idol. Jackson included the song on her 2015-2016 Unbreakable World Tour. "Again" was used as a video interlude on her State of the World Tour in 2017. Jackson included the song on her 2023 Together Again Tour.

== Covers and samples ==
"Again" was covered by How to Dress Well and appeared as a bonus track on his 2012 album Total Loss, which was also inspired by Janet's "The Velvet Rope". According to the singer Tom Krell, "What you're getting is not a report of a feeling, but a sonic presentation of the feeling," he said about the cover. The song was sampled by Iyaz on his 2010 single "Solo". According to Leah Greenblatt of Entertainment Weekly, "it riffs 'Again', without directly sampling either the main hook or re-upping the lyrics directly. The song just lifts a substantial chunk of Janet's lilting melody." The melody was also used in Stanley Clarke's song "Lucky Again" on his 1995 album At the Movies.

== Accolades ==
Award	Category	Result	Ref.
Academy Awards	Best Original Song	Nominated	
ASCAP Awards	R&B Music	Won	
Golden Globe Awards	Best Original Song	Nominated	
Kids' Choice Award	Favorite Song	Nominated	

== Track listing and formats ==
- US and UK CD maxi single (V25H-38411; VSCDG 1481)
1. Album version – 3:47
2. Piano/Vocal – 3:48
3. Instrumental – 3:50
4. "Funky Big Band" – 5:25
- UK 7-inch single and Japanese 3-inch CD single (VS1481; VJDP-10212)
1. Album version – 3:47
2. Piano/Vocal – 3:48
- UK and Japanese CD single (VSCDX1481; VJCP-12021)
1. Album version – 3:47
2. Piano/Vocal – 3:48
3. French version – 3:50
4. "That's the Way Love Goes" (We Aimista Win Mix) – 5:38

== Charts ==
=== Weekly charts ===
Chart (1993–1994)	Peak position
Australia (ARIA)	19
Belgium (Ultratop 50 Flanders)	31
Canada Top Singles (RPM)	2
Canada Adult Contemporary (RPM)	9
Canada Contemporary Hit Radio (The Record)	2
Europe (Eurochart Hot 100)	17
Europe (European Dance Radio)	5
Europe (European Hit Radio)	3
Finland (Suomen virallinen singlelista)	17
Germany (GfK)	29
Iceland (Íslenski Listinn Topp 40)	26
Ireland (IRMA)	12
Netherlands (Dutch Top 40)	20
Netherlands (Single Top 100)	20
New Zealand (Recorded Music NZ)	13
Panama (UPI)	3
Sweden (Sverigetopplistan)	5
Switzerland (Schweizer Hitparade)	20
UK Singles (Official Charts)	6
UK Airplay (Music Week)	1
UK Dance (Music Week)	12
US Billboard Hot 100	1
US Adult Contemporary (Billboard)	4
US Hot R&B/Hip-Hop Songs (Billboard)	7
US Pop Airplay (Billboard)	2
US Rhythmic Airplay (Billboard)	3
US Cash Box Top 100	1
US Adult Contemporary (Radio & Records)	4
US Contemporary Hit Radio (Radio & Records)	1
US Urban (Radio & Records)	1

=== Year-end charts ===
Chart (1993)	Position
Canada Top Singles (RPM)	32
Netherlands (Dutch Top 40)	145
Sweden (Topplistan)	67
UK Singles (OCC)	66
US Billboard Hot 100	74
US Adult Contemporary (Radio & Records)	92
US Contemporary Hit Radio (Radio & Records)	33
US Urban (Radio & Records)	77

Chart (1994)	Position
Brazil (Mais Tocadas)	34
Canada Adult Contemporary (RPM)	86
Sweden (Topplistan)	70
US Billboard Hot 100	12
US Adult Contemporary (Billboard)	28
US Hot R&B Singles (Billboard)	96
US Cash Box Top 100	14
US Adult Contemporary (Radio & Records)	46

=== Decade-end charts ===
Chart (1990–1999)	Position
US Billboard Hot 100	56

== Certifications ==
Region	Certification	Certified units/sales
United States (RIAA)	Platinum	1,000,000

== Release history ==
Region	Date	Format(s)	Label(s)	Ref.
United States	October 12, 1993	CD; cassette	Virgin	
United Kingdom	November 8, 1993	7-inch vinyl; CD; cassette	Virgin	
Australia	November 15, 1993	CD1; cassette	Virgin	
Australia	December 6, 1993	CD2	Virgin	
Japan	December 1, 1993	Mini-CD	Virgin	
