= If (Janet Jackson song) =

1993 single by Janet Jackson

Single by Janet Jackson

from the album Janet
- B-side: "One More Chance"
- Released: July 13, 1993
- Studio: Flyte Tyme (Edina, Minnesota)
- Genre: R&B; new jack swing; trip hop; industrial rock; hip-hop
- Length: 4:31
- Label: Virgin
- Songwriters: Janet Jackson; Justin Herbert; James Harris III; Terry Lewis; Harvey Fuqua; John Bristol; Jackey Beavers
- Producers: Janet Jackson; Jimmy Jam and Terry Lewis

Janet Jackson singles chronology
"That's the Way Love Goes" (1993)	"If" (1993)	"Again" (1993)

Music video
- "If" on YouTube

"If" is a song by American singer-songwriter Janet Jackson from her fifth album, Janet (1993). Jackson co-wrote and co-produced "If" with Jimmy Jam and Terry Lewis, with Harvey Fuqua, John Bristol and Jackey Beavers receiving songwriting credits for the sampling of their composition "Someday We'll Be Together", performed by Diana Ross & the Supremes. "If" was released as the album's second single on July 13, 1993, by Virgin Records. It fuses various genres, including rock, trip hop and industrial music, with elements of new jack swing and hip-hop.

"If" received critical acclaim, with most critics noting Jackson's evolution into a sexual persona from her prior reserved, celibate public image. It received a BMI Pop Award for Most Played Song and was also ranked among Slant Magazine's "Best Singles of the 1990s" list. It peaked at number four on the US Billboard Hot 100 and was certified gold by the Recording Industry Association of America. It also performed well in Canada, New Zealand and the United Kingdom.

The accompanying music video for "If", directed by Dominic Sena, portrays voyeurism, sensuality and intense choreography, while depicting technology that was unavailable at the time, such as touch screens and web cameras. The video received various accolades, including Best Female Video and Best Dance Video at the MTV Video Music Awards, and a Billboard Award for Dance Clip of the Year. It was also voted the second best female video of the decade by Idolator. Jackson performed "If" at the MTV Video Music Awards in a medley with "That's the Way Love Goes", in addition to several of her concert tours.

== Background ==
"If"
A 30-second sample of "If", fusing multiple genres into its production as Jackson sings in a low, breathy tone.

Jackson's role in the film Poetic Justice gave her the confidence to attempt edgier themes musically, commenting "I know it would shock people, but I'm not doing it for shock value. And I know there are some people that are going to say, 'No, I will not be able to accept this because this is a little girl that we saw when she was seven years old.'" She continued, "Everybody says, 'Oh, my God, you've changed so much. Is this really you?'," described to laugh before saying, "Of course it's me." Virgin Records wanted the song to be janet's lead single, saying "it could have a great dance video." Jackson disagreed, deciding to release it as the album's second release. The song was written by Jackson in a conference room during a label meeting. Describing the process, Jackson said "Once you get into recording, it almost has a life of its own. We really got rolling when we did the song "If". Writing a song can happen any kind of way ... Jimmy [Jam] was watching a ballgame and playing around on the keyboards. I ask him to play the chords he was playing again ... "If" turned out to be funkier, gritter." Speaking about its theme, she stated "the song is about fantasizing. I've had those feelings [expressed in the song]..it's my time to share!" Jackson added, "[its] about a girl who goes to a club and fantasizes about this guy: serious fantasies about the things she'd do to him if she was his girl – the positions and things like that. But she's not, so she can't, so she gets pretty frustrated in the second verse – without it being too much. It's still within good taste."

== Critical reception ==
"Jackson is consumed with sexual fantasies of a man who doesn't even know she exists. Wailing guitar chords and hip-hop programming move this punchy, fast-paced dance number as Jackson creates erotic pictures in the mind of her soon-to-be lover to get to his physique."

— Telegram & Gazette on "If"

"If" was acclaimed for its innovation and sonic progression, as well as its sexuality and usage of multiple genres. Patrick Corcoran from Albumism called it "a pounding, fuzzed-up, nasty-sounding track that drips with the thrill of lust at first sight." David Nathan of B&S Magazine remarked that the song pulls no punches. "Listening to it and reading the lyrics Janet wrote in a Virgin Records conference room, I blush - in itself a rare occurrence." BBC Radio 3's commended it as an "impressive industrial fury" based on "oral satisfaction". Andrew Hammp from Billboard declared it a "rockin' dance track," with strings that "anchor the climax." The song's theme of avoiding temptation to interfere with monogamy was also noted, adding "Though Jackson lets her mind race with naughty thoughts [...], she ultimately stops herself from going after someone else's man." Another editor, Larry Flick described it as a "moist, seductive teaser, wrapped in an equally sexy pop/hiphop groove." He added, "Her honey-sweet voice bounces off cyborg guitar riffing, taking the rhythm-rock vibe of her Rhythm Nation hit "Black Cat" to a more intense level. Tucked beneath the pleasingly crowded production is an infectious chorus and a nifty funk bassline." Greg Kot from Chicago Tribune wrote, "There's a surprising, fuzzed-up guitar riff lifted from Peter Gabriel's 'Sledgehammer' that gives 'If' some punch." David Browne from Entertainment Weekly exclaimed it "takes Jackson into exciting new terrain," blending her vocals with "a traffic jam in a city of cyborgs." A writer for Idolator called it an "industrial dance/sex epic" in addition to "infectious and raunchy," saying "Janet Jackson's unmistakable voice is used to perfection to create an eerily tropical but beautiful track." "If" was also interpreted as "a swirling epic number", fusing "90s disco with guitar-rock," using a "Hendrix-lite guitar" throughout the song. Jackson's vocals were delivered at "break-neck speed, practically rapping about the salacious pleasures of her lover," while its production had "a lot of styles on display," including "distorted synth meets acoustic guitar."

Nicholas Jennings of Maclean's called the "guitar-driven" song a "standout" for its explicit lines. Alan Jones from Music Week gave it four out of five, noting it as "certainly unusual, and certainly a hit." Jon Pareles of The New York Times observed the song to open with a "screaming guitar and a chanted verse, rising to a sweet melody." A reviewer from Popblerd said it "starts with guitar feedback" before transitioning into "a sweaty, sexy dance workout", adding it "blew us away." James Hamilton from the RM Dance Update called it "guitar yowled swirling jittery jack swing pop". Dave Ritz from Rolling Stone qualified it as both "subtle and bold," with Jackson's "bedroom fantasies" given "a fierce dressing-up — tough jeep beats, hard-rock guitar, and a Diana Ross & The Supremes sample — and some missed just what she was on about." Music critic Richard Croft raved "the janet. album was a big sex-fest from beginning to end but nowhere was it hotter than 'If'," labeling the chorus "infectious, at the same time bitchy and vulnerable, defiant and desperate." The song's sexuality was considered to accomplish "the rare thing of being feminist and feminine at the same time without compromising either," saying the song is "a big pleading love song that put her totally at the whim of the man, and a big fuck-off anthem that said "I'm here, I'm Janet freaking Jackson, but if you're not gonna notice me then get bent". Phrased a little differently, of course." Sal Cinquemani of Slant Magazine said its content was "impending or simply imagined", adding "the very title of which embodies that fact, is essentially about masturbation, with Janet describing what her lover's "smooth and shiny [cock]" feels like against her lips while ostensibly rubbing herself off under the covers". Pete Stanton from Smash Hits gave "If" four out of five, declaring it "her sauciest and funkiest yet." He added, "Janet's turning into Prince — and that's not such a bad thing." Craig S. Semon of the Telegram & Gazette stated "the naughty seducer" to be one of Jackson's "most exciting tracks." An anecdote also stated Jackson became "the sex kitten every man dreamed she would be," opposed to formerly known as "a sweet fresh faced girl singing little ditties about young love." The lyrics "purposely leaves something to the imagination," leaving one to wonder what Jackson is referring to: "Could Janet be talking about the lips, chest, or a man's procreation stick? For freakiness' sake, I'd like to go with the last option over everything." A reviewer from Vibe called it "a weird masterpiece".

== Chart performance ==
"If" debuted at number 57 on the US Billboard Hot 100. It peaked at number four and was certified Gold by the Recording Industry Association of America (RIAA) on September 28, 1993. It reached number three on the Hot R&B Singles chart and peaked atop the Dance Club Play chart. It placed at number 19 on the annual year-end chart and sold 600,000 copies. In Canada, the song debuted at number 92 before peaking at number three in October. It spent a total of nineteen weeks on the chart and was ranked at number 25 on Canada's RPM year-end chart. In the United Kingdom, "If" debuted on UK Singles Chart at number 23 and peaked at number 14 the following week. It spent a total of seven weeks on the chart. The song performed moderately in Europe and Oceania. The song peaked within the top 10 in Sweden, the Netherlands, and New Zealand, also peaking within the top 20 in Australia.

On April 2, 2011, the song charted at number forty-five on the Billboard Dance/Electronic Digital Songs chart.

== Music video ==
=== Background ===
The accompanying music video for "If" was directed by American director Dominic Sena and choreographed by Tina Landon and Jackson, with additional choreography by Omar Lopez and Keith Williams. It takes place in an Asian nightclub, displaying touch-screen technology and web cameras used to monitor the interactions of patrons. Jackson is the club's main performer, being observed by patrons through screens who are able to enter the function by saying the correct password. The video's themes of sexual fantasy, desire, and voyeurism were intended as an elaborate metaphor for the song's racy content. The video was also thought to have a "Blasian" theme, portraying interracial lust in the clip's "body language, the atmosphere and her smoldering off-stage eye contact" with Jackson's male interest, Michael Gregory Gong.

Jackson commented on the video, stating "It's nothing nasty or dirty, but it's very sexy. During taping I kept saying, 'Oh, my god, I'm glad my mother is not here.'" An alternate version of the video known as the "All Dance Version" focuses solely on the video's choreography. This version was shown on many music channels due to the original's suggestive visuals regarded as very explicit at the time. The uncensored video appears on the From janet. to Damita Jo: The Videos compilation, while the alternate version is included on the janet. video release and re-release of All for You.

=== Synopsis ===
The video opens with a moonlit scene of a woman wearing a Kimono walking towards a building in an Asian village. The woman walks to the door, looks into a hidden camera and says the password, "If". A man operating the door from inside then grants her access to the festivities. The inside of the bordello is then shown as a green light turns on, signaling male dancers to be lowered from the ceiling, who descend upside down on ropes in a winding fashion simulating a corkscrew. The woman is then shown entering the club. A wider view of the club is then revealed, with club patron watching the stage as female dancers perform. Various scenes of people attending the club are shown through touch-screen monitors and web cameras.

Multiple screens are shown, and a man watching some of the other patron on the monitor uses the futuristic touch-screen to select angles of the performance on the main stage. The doors on the main platform then rapidly open as Janet, who is wearing a black and white top, black pants and a Bohemian choker, descends the stairs and enters the main stage, surrounded by blowing red fabric and a radiant white light. She focuses solely on one man in the audience watching her through the monitor as she and her dancers start performing a sexually suggestive dance routine, three women in high fashion outfits are shown walking through the club and observing the men in attendance through a monitor.

As Jackson continues entertaining the crowd, the woman who was originally shown entering the bordello is again seen walking through the event, quickly paying one of the guards to allow her into the club's private sector. Jackson continues the routine as additional scenes on a monitor are briefly seen. This leads into the video's choreographed breakdown, with Jackson performing the routine as angles switch multiple times. Jackson continues the intricate dance while a woman is shown touching the image of a man's faces on another screen. Another woman is then shown on a webcam, becoming aroused while observing a couple engaging in sexual activity.

The video's final dance sequence begins, with Janet grabbing a male dancer's crotch region and simulating oral sex, before placing him on the floor and bending him over. Janet continues to seductively watch the man in the audience as she performs, kneeling before the male dancer and then lowering him to floor. The video ends with the man in the audience passionately touching an image of Janet on the monitor, as the woman who was shown entering the club is then seen exiting and walking towards the village.

=== Reception ===
Described by Jackson as "a female fantasy," David Ritz of Rolling Stone analyzed the video to include "tantalizing bodies" and "mock-cunnilingus," along with the "scrambled" reality and rampant voyeurism of Jackson watching herself as she's observed by others through various monitors. Us Weekly described the set as an "elaborate, multilevel Chinese restaurant," complete with balconies, stairways and wide-screen monitors. The video's attire is all black, with the concept of "an overheated sexual fantasy," in specific a male dancer being "grabbed, pawed and shoved around" by Jackson as she "drops down, reaches through his legs and grabs his crotch," before she changes positions, "seizes his head and pulls it down to her own crotch." The excerpt concluded, "ignore the demure young woman whose musical message to a would-be lover used to be "Let's Wait Awhile." Ladies and gentlemen, cover your crotches: Janet Jackson has grown up." Arena Magazine described it as a "dramatic" change, remarking "the black uniform ripped off to reveal a slimmed-down, body-conscious Janet. The transformation was dramatic."

Jet Magazine thought the video displayed "a liberated Janet, who flirted with eroticism but steered clear of moves that would be considered pornographic," also used to "showcase her pelvic thrusts and flashy dance moves." Billboard exclaimed "If" to be a "climax" which is "inseparable from its iconic music video," based on its "head-slapping choreography." The video's "seductive style of movement" was heralded as an evolution, replacing bulky militant uniforms with "midriff baring tops and chokers," embracing her "womanhood and sexuality." Slant Magazine thought the video fulfilled the purpose of "providing the impetus behind one of the greatest dance-break routines in music video history." The video was also praised as featuring "some of the most iconic choreography in history," adding "it's (sic) stunning imagery, ground-breaking choreography and Janet's fierce attitude is what made this a masterpiece."

=== Legacy and influence ===
"If" is one of several of Jackson's videos considered to influence a higher degree of sexual freedom among young women. Jean M. Twenge, author of Generation Me: Why Today's Young Americans are More Confident, Assertive, Entitled—and More Miserable Than Ever Before (2007), wrote "in the 1950s, only 3% of the young women had received oral sex from a man. By the mid-1990s, however, 75% of women aged 18-24 had experienced cunnilingus. Music videos by female artists have contributed to the trend," with Jackson "heavily implying male-on-female oral sex in music videos by pushing down on a man's head until he's in exactly the right position." Similarly, Paula Kamen in Her Way: Young Women Remake the Sexual Revolution (2000) states that "[i]n the early to mid-1990s, oral sex even reached mainstream music as politically charged demand of truly liberated women," citing Jackson as a prime example of a female artist simulating cunnilingus in her videos, specifically in "If."

The video was innovative for its depiction of touch-screen technology and web cams, which were not yet invented at the time of its release. Jackson later said, "I don't think people really realize what we were showing in that video that wasn't available with technology then. The video featured futuristic technology, specifically high definition touch screens. I wanted the actors in the video to use these screens to communicate, and relate with each other in the clubs. Similar to what we all do with our smart phones and tablets today. As I look at our lives now, it seems that life is imitating art." Jackson's balance of masculine ensemble with feminine outfits was also regarded as an immense part of her appeal, saying "Janet was the queen of tomboy looks and a full fledged sex symbol at the same time. She merged the two opposites seamlessly, from baggy jeans and floppy hats to skintight Navajo bra tops in the "If" video."

Britney Spears was influenced by "If" for videos such as "I'm a Slave 4 U", saying "Janet's video for 'If'. I saw that, and I admired it and wanted to be like her," calling Jackson a "powerful role model" with "her own identity". Elements of the "If" choreography has been referenced frequently, including "multiple videos" by Britney Spears, Beyoncé, Lady Gaga, Jennifer Lopez, Pink, Ciara, Mýa, Missy Elliott, and N' Sync, with specific examples including Christina Milian's "Dip It Low", Lil' Kim's "No Matter What They Say", and Paula Abdul's "My Love Is for Real". 'N Sync also performed the video's dance breakdown during the opening performance on their debut tour and in their "I Want You Back" video. A critique of the video added, "Women want to be her. The gays want to be like her. Men want to do morally questionable things to her... The current crop of artists, "including Gaga, Rihanna, Beyoncé, Britney etc ALL follow her trail-blazing footsteps."

Jackson's videography, the "If" video in particular, helped establish Tina Landon's career as a legendary choreographer, with many subsequent female pop artists, including Britney Spears, Rihanna, Jennifer Lopez, Pink, Shakira, and Christina Aguilera, requesting to work with her for their own music videos and projects.

== Live performances ==
Jackson performed the song as a medley with "That's the Way Love Goes" at the MTV Video Music Awards on September 2, 1993. She wore a leather crop top and jeans for this performance. The performance was introduced by actor Christian Slater, who declared Jackson to have "the sexiest bellybutton I've ever seen" during the announcement. The MTV Video Music Awards performance is often considered one of the most infamous and intricate performances of Jackson's career. Complex considered the performance among "The 25 Sexiest Moments in VMA History," commenting "when Britney and Christina were busy dealing with midterms and acne, Janet Jackson was the queen of bringing sexy to the VMA stage. Though it'd no doubt be considered tame by today's standards, Janet's exposed stomach and bra made for the hottest performance of the year."

On the 1993-95 janet. World Tour, Jackson performed "If" as the opening song. Lenny Stoute of the Toronto Star stated "This pelvic-thrusting, butt-wiggling, lip-licking high-energy temptress is a long way from the cute 'n' chubby girl next door of her previous Rhythm Nation tour. And she came equipped with the tough dance moves, firm muscles and seven costume changes to emphasize the difference." Jet Magazine wrote, "Janet mesmerzied the crowd by opening with the hit song, 'If'." It has also been performed on all of her following tours, the janet. World Tour, The Velvet Rope Tour, All for You Tour, Rock Witchu Tour, Number Ones, Up Close and Personal, Unbreakable World Tour, and the State of the World Tour. It is also included in her 2019 Las Vegas Residency Janet Jackson: Metamorphosis. Jackson included the song on her 2023 Together Again Tour.

"If" was also performed at the 2009 American Music Awards as promotion for Number Ones, during a medley with "Miss You Much", "What Have You Done for Me Lately", "Make Me", and "Together Again". On the 2011 Number Ones, Up Close and Personal tour, The Boston Herald called the performance "an all-out dance onslaught," praising her ability to still perform "the same stylized dance moves from the classic 1993 video." The Seattle Times exclaimed "As a woman who has never been afraid to strut her sexuality, her oh-no-you-didn't dance moves are always a delight. "If's" crotch grabbing and finger licking were classic Ms. Jackson (if you're nasty)", also saying this "served as reminders that dancing is sometimes as important as the songs themselves." An additional critique declared routine "defined her career and set her apart from contemporaries, including the newer crop of performers," adding "the in-you-face-sexy "If" made it "apparent that Ms. Jackson hasn't lost a step — even at 45."

== Legacy ==
In 2013, Esquire Magazine placed the song's "hypothetical" situation among their list of "Sexiest Janet Jackson songs," saying "Janet wants you but you're in another relationship and she respects boundaries (but her mind is still dirty)." Rakesh Satwell of New York Magazine praised "If" as "a punch to the eardrum," declaring that it remains "as fresh as it did then" and a departure from radio trends twenty years after its release. Satwell considered the song "overwhelming" in the current mainstream landscape, in comparison to "our David Guetta glut." The song was commended as a "more impressive feat" for sounding "as it if it's from the future," in contrast to hits such as Robin Thicke's "Blurred Lines" and Outkast's "Hey Ya!" which glorified "musical silk of the past." In a similar comparison, its overall tone was considered "ten times more effective" than Rihanna's "S&M." Additionally, Satwell considered "If" one of Jackson's defining artistic moments, with the song's "sinister" and erotic tone evoked in future releases by artists such as Rihanna and Ke$ha. Satwell expressed consistently hearing "strains of its DNA" in various songs; its fusion of varied genres was considered to inspire subsequent stylistic songs such as LCD Soundsystem's "One Touch," Rihanna's "Rockstar 101," and Aaliyah's "What If?." The orchestral sample used twice was regarded as "genius" as an "innocuous but extremely effective garnish," allowing Jackson to "seethe with intensity" over the sound of "multiple drones." Satwell considered Jackson to make a "definitive sexual statement" in a way which was "groundbreaking, indelible, and mesmerizing way," concluding "few people have ever had more rhythm and control than Janet Jackson did in the summer of 1993."

The song was applauded as a "sweaty, sexy dance workout" which "still holds up" twenty years after its premiere. Slant Magazine ranked "If" as the twenty-second best song of the nineties, saying the "dance rock" song "found Miss Jackson asserting her right to have an orgasm the likes of which would dwarf your puny muscular spasms." Over filtered production suggesting "a cybernetic logjam," the song effectively "prowls, marking its prey, staking its claim," likened to Jackson "playing with your mind". The song's peak of "sweet harmonies of the bridge" plunges into "the crunching paradox of the chorus," ultimately decided to be "more metallic than carnal". The track was also heralded as "a BIG-ASS song that made a mark and blazed a trail." The song's theme of "hypothetical sexual fantasies" with undertones of sadness were considered "erotic and defiant", and its production of "wailing guitar chords, insanely catchy hip-hop beats, and some of Janet's best vocals" determined it as potentially "the most eclectic song of her entire discography." Alicia Jackson of The Redefined said the song's "soft, sing-song nature" melded with "pure raunchiness" were "the gateways to who I am today," in relating the lyrics contrasted with Jackson's shy persona. Pitchfork ranked the song as the fiftieth best song of the nineties, calling it "the fiercest track from her chart-obliterating Janet album".

== Awards and nominations ==
List of accolades for "If"

Award	Nominated work	Result
Billboard Awards	Dance Clip of the Year	Won
BMI Pop Awards	Most Played Song	Won
Idolator	Best Female VMA Winning Video of the '90s — #2 (2013)	—N/a
MTV Video Music Awards	Best Female Video	Won
MTV Video Music Awards	Best Choreography in a Video	Nominated
MTV Video Music Awards	Best Dance Video	Nominated
Playboy Magazine Entertainment Awards	Music Video of the Year	Won
Slant Magazine	100 Best Singles of the '90s — #22	—N/a
Soul Train Music Awards	Video of the Year	Won

== Covers and remixes ==
Kelly Clarkson performed "If" on many dates of her All I Ever Wanted Tour. Kwon Yuri of Girls' Generation performed covers of "If" during the 2011 Girls' Generation Tour. A studio version was released the following year. Dance troupe A.S.I.I.D. performed a routine to "If" on an episode of America's Best Dance Crew titled "Janet Jackson Challenge". Charmaine P. Dennis of Cinema Blend commented "Everyone knows the famous hand blade/shuffle move, and the group pulls it off lovely."

Electronic artist EPROM released a remix of "If" in 2011. Okayfuture described it as a "bubbly, reverb infused, deep bass remix", and Hypetrak said "Janet was one of the most influential pop albums during the early nineties. Thus, it is more than right that its standout single, "If," is still a demanded subject to reinterpretation." Kaytranada released a remix of "If" in 2012. Okayplayer gave the remix a positive review, stating "That bumpin' bassline, the infectious claps and overall bouncin' nu-disco vibe... had us at hello. Rarely have we ever seen a sample done oh so right."

The pop/rock band, Pells Voice, released a cover version of "If" in 2015 on their debut EP, Expert Pretender.

== Track listings ==
- US CD maxi single
1. "If" (Brothers in Rhythm house mix) – 7:07
2. "If" (Brothers in Rhythm Swing Yo Pants mix) – 6:20
3. "If" (Tee's Freeze mix) – 7:17
4. "If" (extended LP mix) – 5:40
5. "If" (TNT Bass mix) – 5:36
6. "If" (D&D 12-inch Mix/Adult 12-inch) – 5:47
7. "If" (short single edit) – 2:59
8. "One More Chance" – 5:54
- US 12-inch single
1. "If" (Brothers in Rhythm house mix) – 7:07
2. "If" (Brothers in Rhythm Swing Yo Pants mix) – 6:20
3. "If" (Tee's Freeze mix) – 7:17
4. "If" (extended LP mix) – 5:40
- US double 12-inch single
1. "If" (Brothers in Rhythm house mix) – 7:07
2. "If" (Brothers in Rhythm dub) – 7:00
3. "If" (extended LP mix) – 5:40
4. "If" (Tee's radio mix) – 4:02
5. "If" (D&D 7-inch mix) – 4:23
6. "If" (Tee's Freeze mix) – 7:17
7. "If" (TNT Bass mix) – 5:36
8. "If" (Brothers in Rhythm Swing Yo Pants mix) – 6:20
9. "If" (D&D JDD mix) – 5:26
10. "If" (Tee's Capella) – 2:09
- UK CD single
- Japanese CD single
1. "If" (radio edit) – 3:49
2. "If" (Brothers in Rhythm house mix) – 7:07
3. "If" (Tee's Freeze mix) – 7:17
4. "If" (Brothers in Rhythm Swing Yo Pants mix) – 6:20
5. "If" (extended LP mix) – 5:40
6. "If" (D&D 12-inch mix) – 5:47
- UK 12-inch single
1. "If" (Brothers in Rhythm house mix) – 7:07
2. "If" (Brothers in Rhythm dub) – 7:00
3. "If" (radio edit) – 3:49
4. "If" (extended LP mix) – 5:40
5. "If" (Brothers in Rhythm Swing Yo Pants mix) – 6:20
6. "If" (D&D 12-inch mix) – 5:47
- French CD single
- Japanese 3-inch CD single
1. "If" (radio edit) – 3:49
2. "One More Chance" – 5:54

== Credits and personnel ==
Credits are adapted from the janet. liner notes.

- Janet Jackson – lead vocals, backing vocals, producer
- Jimmy Jam – producer
- Terry Lewis – producer
- Steve Hodge – mixing
- Dave Rideau – mixing
- Todd Terry – remixer
- Darryl James – remixer
- David Anthony – remixer

== Charts ==
=== Weekly charts ===
Chart (1993)	Peak position
Australia (ARIA)	18
Belgium (Ultratop 50 Flanders)	27
Canada Retail Singles (The Record)	1
Canada Contemporary Hit Radio (The Record)	1
Canada Top Singles (RPM)	3
Canada Dance/Urban (RPM)	4
Europe (Eurochart Hot 100)	25
Europe (European Dance Radio)	10
Europe (European Hit Radio)	9
Finland (Suomen virallinen singlelista)	11
Germany (GfK)	25
Greece (Pop & Rock)	4
Iceland (Íslenski Listinn Topp 40)	26
Netherlands (Dutch Top 40)	10
Netherlands (Single Top 100)	10
New Zealand (Recorded Music NZ)	8
Spanish Airplay (Music & Media)	8
Sweden (Sverigetopplistan)	19
Switzerland (Schweizer Hitparade)	27
UK Singles (Official Charts)	14
UK Airplay (Music Week)	6
UK Dance (Music Week)	3
UK Club Chart (Music Week)	2
US Billboard Hot 100	4
US Dance Club Songs (Billboard)	1
US Dance Singles Sales (Billboard)	4
US Hot R&B/Hip-Hop Songs (Billboard)	3
US Maxi-Singles Sales (Billboard)	1
US Pop Airplay (Billboard)	2
US Rhythmic Airplay (Billboard)	3
US Cash Box Top 100	2
US Contemporary Hit Radio (Radio & Records)	2
US Urban (Radio & Records)	1

=== Year-end charts ===
Chart (1993)	Position
Australia (ARIA)	80
Canada Top Singles (RPM)	25
US Billboard Hot 100	19
US Dance Club Play (Billboard)	35
US Hot R&B Singles (Billboard)	28
US Maxi-Singles Sales (Billboard)	41
US Cash Box Top 100	23
US Contemporary Hit Radio (Radio & Records)	10
US Urban (Radio & Records)	20

=== Decade-end charts ===
Chart (1990–1999)	Position
Canada (Nielsen SoundScan)	91

== Certifications ==
Region	Certification	Certified units/sales
United States (RIAA)	Platinum	600,000

== Release history ==
Region	Date	Format(s)	Label(s)	Ref.
United States	July 13, 1993	12-inch vinyl; CD; cassette	Virgin	
United Kingdom	July 19, 1993	7-inch vinyl; 12-inch vinyl; CD; cassette	Virgin	
Australia	August 2, 1993	CD; cassette	Virgin	
Japan	August 30, 1993	Mini-CD	Virgin	
