= Because of Love =

1994 single by Janet Jackson

Single by Janet Jackson

from the album Janet
- Released: January 10, 1994
- Studio: Flyte Tyme (Edina, Minnesota)
- Genre: Pop; funk
- Length: 4:20
- Label: Virgin
- Songwriters: Janet Jackson; James Harris III; Terry Lewis
- Producers: Jimmy Jam and Terry Lewis; Janet Jackson

Janet Jackson singles chronology
"Again" (1993)	"Because of Love" (1994)	"Any Time, Any Place" / "And On and On" (1994)

Music video
- "Because of Love" on YouTube

"Because of Love" is a song by American singer-songwriter Janet Jackson from her fifth album, Janet (1993). It was released in January 1994, by Virgin Records, as the album's fourth single. The track is a love song written and produced by Jackson and Jimmy Jam and Terry Lewis. A remix, the Frankie & David Treat Mix, appears on Jackson's second remix compilation Janet Remixed (1995). The song peaked at number ten on the US Billboard Hot 100 and number 19 on the UK Singles Chart. Its accompanying music video was directed by Beth McCarthy.

== Critical reception ==
Upon the release, Larry Flick from Billboard magazine wrote, "Jackson is at her most playful on this adorable pop/funk ditty. Though it does not have the lyrical depth or musical range of past hits, tune has an instantly memorable hook and several fun sing-along passages that renders it simply irresistable." Alan Jones from Music Week gave the song a score of four out of five, adding, "Not a number one, but bound for the upper reaches." Tom Doyle from Smash Hits gave it two out of five, saying, "Janet keeps the Jackson flag a-flying with another track from her Janet LP. In it she goes "Shoop-shoop-a-doo-doop" over a repetitive house beat, then wafts the merest hint of a melody over it, then it all stops."

== Chart performance ==
"Because of Love" became Jackson's first solo single since 1987's "The Pleasure Principle" to miss the top five domestically, peaking at number ten on the US Billboard Hot 100 and number six on the US Billboard Hot 100 Airplay. It was a moderate success in other countries reaching the top twenty in the UK and top thirty in Australia.

== Music video ==
The music video for "Because of Love", directed by American television director Beth McCarthy, is composed of footage of Jackson and her dancers on the promo TV Shows tour (London; Leipzig, Saxony; New York City; Paris and Sydney) and rehearsals of Janet World Tour in Hartford, Connecticut. It was later included on the repackaged edition of 2001's All for You as well as the 2004 DVD From Janet to Damita Jo: The Videos. The close up footage of Janet Jackson was filmed at The Four Seasons Hotel, Boston.

== Live performances ==
Jackson performed the song on her janet. Tour and was the dedication song for the country of Taiwan for her 2011 Number Ones, Up Close and Personal tour. The song was also used in the DJ Intermission session on the 2017-2019 State of the World Tour. For the first time in nearly 30 years, Jackson included the song on her 2023 Together Again Tour.

== Track listing and formats ==
- US 12-inch single (Y-38422)
1. Frankie & David classic 12-inch – 7:49
2. Frankie & David dub – 8:02
3. Frankie & David Trick mix – 6:42
4. Frankie & David Treat mix – 6:40
5. D&D extended mix – 5:10
- US CD maxi single (V25H-38422)
1. LP version – 4:12
2. Frankie & David classic 12-inch – 7:48
3. D&D extended mix – 5:08
4. Muggs 7-inch with bass intro – 3:32
5. Frankie & David dub – 8:02
6. D&D slow version – 4:30
- Dutch CD maxi single (VSCDF 1488)
1. LP version – 4:14
2. Frankie & David Classic 12" – 7:49
3. D&D Extended Mix – 5:10
- UK 7-inch single (VS1488)
1. LP version – 4:14
2. Frankie & David 7-inch – 3:33
- UK 12-inch single (VST 1488)
1. Frankie & David classic 12-inch – 7:49
2. Frankie & David dub – 8:02
3. Frankie & David Trick mix – 6:42
4. Frankie & David Treat mix – 6:40
5. D&D extended mix – 5:10
6. Muggs 7-inch with bass intro – 3:32
- UK CD maxi single (VSCDG 1488)
1. LP version – 4:14
2. Frankie & David 7-inch – 3:33
3. Frankie & David classic 12-inch – 7:49
4. Frankie & David Treat mix – 6:40
5. D&D Bentley radio mix – 3:59
6. Muggs 7-inch with bass intro – 3:32
7. D&D slow version – 5:08

== Charts ==
=== Weekly charts ===
Chart (1994)	Peak position
Australia (ARIA)	25
Canada Contemporary Hit Radio (The Record)	2
Canada Dance Tracks (The Record)	6
Canada Top Singles (RPM)	10
Europe (Eurochart Hot 100)	52
Europe (European AC Radio)	21
Europe (European Hit Radio)	14
Germany (GfK)	72
Israel (Israeli Singles Chart)	26
Netherlands (Dutch Top 40 Tipparade)	2
Netherlands (Single Top 100)	39
New Zealand (Recorded Music NZ)	23
Scottish Singles Sales (Official Charts)	48
UK Singles (Official Charts)	19
UK Airplay (Music Week)	16
UK Dance (Music Week)	5
UK Club Chart (Music Week)	1
US Billboard Hot 100	10
US Adult Contemporary (Billboard)	32
US Dance Club Songs (Billboard)	4
US Dance Singles Sales (Billboard)	4
US Hot R&B/Hip-Hop Songs (Billboard)	9
US Pop Airplay (Billboard)	4
US Rhythmic Airplay (Billboard)	4
US Cash Box Top 100	11

=== Year-end charts ===
Chart (1994)	Position
Canada Top Singles (RPM)	70
UK Club Chart (Music Week)	24
US Billboard Hot 100	48

== Release history ==
Region	Date	Format(s)	Label(s)	Ref(s).
United States	January 10, 1994	12-inch vinyl; CD; cassette	Virgin	
Australia	February 28, 1994	CD; cassette	Virgin	
United Kingdom	February 28, 1994	7-inch vinyl; 12-inch vinyl; CD; cassette	Virgin	
Japan	March 23, 1994	Mini-CD; maxi-CD	Virgin	
