= Q (1970s band) =

1970s American band

Q was a disco group formed in Beaver Falls, Pennsylvania, USA. They released an album on Epic Records entitled Dancin' Man in 1977, which was successful. The group featured two members from Jaggerz, a hit-making group from the early 1970s. The title track from the album was released as a single and was successful in the US, becoming a Top 40 hit.

== Commercial success ==
Q released a single, titled "Dancin' Man," in Spring 1977 (the B side was entitled "Love Pollution"); spurred on by regional airplay and a full-page ad taken out in Billboard magazine, the single became a Top 30 hit in the US, peaking at number 23. In the UK, though not a national hit, in London the song reached number 8 on Capital Radio's 'Capital Countdown' Top 40 in May 1977.

Q's debut album, also titled "Dancin' Man," was less successful, reaching #140 on the Billboard 200. The group's second single, "Sweet Summertime," stalled out at number 107 in the US, essentially rendering the group a one-hit wonder.

== Members ==
- Don Garvin - guitar, vocals
- Robert Peckman - bass, vocals
- Bill Thomas - keyboards, vocals
- Bill Vogel - drums, vocals
