= Janet World Tour =

1993–95 concert tour by Janet Jackson

janet. World Tour
- Tour by Janet Jackson
- Poster for the 1995 Australian leg, autographed by Jackson
- Associated album: janet.
- Start date: November 24, 1993
- End date: April 22, 1995
- Legs: 6
- No. of shows: 82 in North America; 9 in Asia; 11 in Australia; 23 in Europe; 125 total

Janet Jackson concert chronology
- Rhythm Nation World Tour (1990); janet. World Tour (1993–95); The Velvet Rope Tour (1998–99)

Janet World Tour (stylized as janet. World Tour) was the second concert tour by American recording artist Janet Jackson. It was launched in support of her fifth studio album Janet (1993). It began in November 1993 and continued through April 1995. Concerts were held in North America, Europe, Asia, and Australia. It is believed shows were performed in South America. However, there are not exact details and most information is unknown.

Jackson's 1990 tour made history as the most successful debut concert tour in history. Like its predecessor, this tour became known for its theatrical grandeur—incorporating complex choreography, pyrotechnics, video display, stage design, and costuming—drawing comparison to Broadway theatre. Jackson visited four continents and eighteen countries within the span of 17 months. The tour had 125 dates and is the most shows Jackson has done for any concert. The show received positive reviews, and a number of reviews observed her showmanship had improved. The shows in North America, in 1994, earned $18.1 million. Though the tour was professionally recorded, it has never received a video release as of 2024.

== Development ==
Costumes and wardrobe for the tour were designed by stylist Tanya Gill, with outfits "rang[ing] from pipebone vests with high-heeled moccasin boots to zoot suits top-hats to circus-ringmaster bustiers." With a show encompassing over 100 costumes, a team of over 50 costume makers was led by wardrobe supervisor Helen Hiatt.

MTV promoted the Janet World Tour with a one-hour special in Jackson's honor, "hosted by MTV VJs Bill Bellamy and John Norris, [which featured] performance highlights, interviews with Jackson and her dancers, and behind-the-scenes production and rehearsal footage." MTV publicist Jennifer Barner stated the channel wanted to give extensive coverage to Jackson's opening concert in Cincinnati, "because it is such a big tour and she's really, really hot now." Despite heavy anticipation for the tour, news media were discouraged from attending opening night, which was seen as a dress rehearsal. A spokeswoman for the tour stated "[w]e really don't want a lot of out-of-town media" even though music critic Rick Bird observed "[n]ormally, such an important tour opening would be attended by pop-music media and paparazzi from around the world. However, Bird also noted a low-key premiere was a strategic move for Jackson and her management, "since the complicated high-tech dance show will likely have some bugs to be worked out before it plays in larger media centers. And, given the adverse publicity the Jackson family is facing these days, the low-key opening night may indeed be the best strategy."

== Critical reception ==
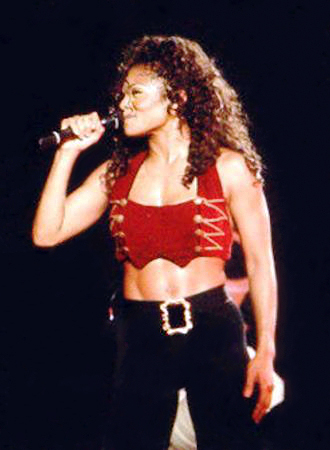
Jackson performing on the tour.

Prior to the tour's launch, the Los Angeles Sentinel commented on the anticipation surrounding Jackson's return, stating: "Her first-ever concert tour in 1990 was the most successful premiere tour by any artist in pop music history. And now, amid great anticipation, Janet Jackson is set to return to the concert trail with her world tour in connection with her already triple platinum-plus 'janet' album ... The tour promises to be an innovative feast of sight and sound, a theatrical experience with spectacular choreography, staging and lighting." Lenny Stoute in the Toronto Star gave a positive review to her performance at the SkyDome in Toronto, Ontario, Canada, stating that "as she'd done with the tour opener in Cincinnati Wednesday, it was a superb production that came with an emotional subtext." Commenting on the highly athletic and sexually provocative performances of such songs as "If", "What Have You Done for Me Lately" and "Nasty", he states: "This pelvic-thrusting, butt-wiggling, lip-licking high-energy temptress is a long way from the cute 'n' chubby girl next door of her previous Rhythm Nation tour. And she came equipped with the tough dance moves, firm muscles and seven costume changes to emphasize the difference."

In December 1993, Jackson had a five-day engagement in New York City at Madison Square Garden, which saw its last concert on New Year's Eve. Jon Pareles of The New York Times stated: "The video-age arena spectacle is in good hands with Janet Jackson. Her current tour, which started a four-night run at Madison Square Garden on Friday night, piles on the production values: music, dancers, costumes, moving sets, video, lights, fireworks, everything but confetti and balloons." He criticized the fact that the concert seemed overtly calculated, leaving little room for spontaneity. However, he compared her musical diversity favorably to other pop icons such as Prince, Madonna and her brother Michael. In reference to her vocal capabilities, Pareles comments that "[l]ike many other video-promoted singers, Ms. Jackson doesn't have a big voice ... But Ms. Jackson is a stronger vocalist than she was when she last toured, three years ago."

According to Andy Smith of the Providence Journal, "Jackson and company created a sensory overload of lights, dancers, video, fireworks, explosions, costumes and sets ... The music was competently performed, but this was a concert for the age of MTV, more satisfying to the eye than the ear." Although he believed she gave a well-performed production, he felt she lacked the stage presence of rivals such as Madonna and Tina Turner. Greg Kot of Rolling Stone wrote: "If a performance can be faulted for being too well-rehearsed and too tautly paced, this was certainly an example ... Small of voice and slight of stature, Jackson seems more at home in a Fame-style ensemble than she does as a larger-than-life performer. Yet it's exactly that quality that makes her so endearing. Despite her impressive string of musical successes, Jackson still acts like the members of her audience." Roberta Fusaro of the Telegram & Gazette, who reviewed her performance at The Centrum stated that Jackson "has shown incredible improvement as a performer since her Rhythm Nation tour ... specifically her dancing and her working of the crowd. She still lacks some of the spontaneity that could raise the level of her concerts from good ones to damn memorable ones, but Janet seemed pretty comfortable on stage last night in front of an all-forgiving near sold-out crowd, commanding the boards like a cross between Tina Turner and Madonna at some points."

In reviewing her concert at the San Jose Arena, Michael Snyder of the San Francisco Chronicle wrote: "That once-blurry line between stadium-size pop music concerts and full-scale theatrical extravaganzas ... is completely eradicated." Citing her tightly choreographed performance, Snyder comments "[h]er theatrical inclinations elevated the concert at San Jose, but some of the music was truncated in the service of the production." Giving his opinion that Jackson proved to be a better performer than a singer, he likened her concert to productions by Broadway theatre and Cirque du Soleil. Karla Peterson of The San Diego Union-Tribune remarked: "Expertly designed, energetically choreographed, and engagingly performed by the large group of musicians and dancers, the 100-minute show ... had everything you'd expect from a pop pro of Jackson's stature." Despite criticism that the show appeared overly structured, Peterson expressed: "To criticize Janet Jackson for cranking out a pre-programmed block of hits is like criticizing a cat for sleeping all day. It is simply what she does, and with the exception of Madonna, Jackson does this high-concept schtick better than anybody. She is a sharp dancer, an appealing performer, and as "That's the Way Love Goes" proves—an ace pop-song writer." Renee Graham of The Boston Globe commented that "Jackson is not so much a singer as a performer and entertainer, more concerned with the visual presentation than scintillating vocals."

== Personnel ==
- Musical director: Rex Salas
- Keyboards: Rex Salas
- Drums: Jonathan Moffett, John Roberts
- Keyboards: Eric Daniels, Brian Simpson
- Percussion: Terry Santiel
- Guitar: David Barry
- Bass: Sam Sims
- Background vocals: Stacy Campbell, Romeo Johnson, and Lisa Taylor
- Choreographer: Tina Landon
- Dancers: Tina Landon, Sean Cheesman, Cynthia Davila, Shawnette Heard, Omar Lopez, Tish Oliver, Kelly Konno, Nikki Pantenburg, Tam Jo (select shows)

== Opening acts ==
- Tony! Toni! Toné! (North America, Leg 1 & 2, select dates)
- Mint Condition (North America, Leg 2, select dates)
- MC Lyte (North America, Leg 3, select dates)
- Tevin Campbell (North America, Leg 3, select dates)
- Kulcha (Australia)
- MN8 (England, France)
- Bill Bellamy (Philadelphia, January 1994)

== Setlist ==
The following setlist was obtained from the concert held on April 20, 1995; at the Wembley Arena in London, England. It does not represent all concerts for the duration of the tour.

1. "If"
2. "What Have You Done for Me Lately" / "Nasty"
3. "Let's Wait Awhile"
4. "Throb"
5. "When I Think of You" / "Escapade" / "Miss You Much"
6. "Love Will Never Do (Without You)"
7. "Alright"
8. "What'll I Do"
9. "Any Time, Any Place"
10. "Again"
11. "Black Cat"
12. "Rhythm Nation"
13. "This Time"
14. "That's the Way Love Goes"

Encore

15. "Because of Love"

Notes

- "Come Back to Me", "What'll I Do", and "Where are You Now" were only performed on the first few dates of the tour before being cut from the setlist. "And On and On" was only performed at select shows during the third leg of the tour. "Black Cat" and "This Time" were exclusively performed during the first leg in North America.
- During each show, one of these three songs would be performed as the last song of each concert. "Because Of Love" was performed on the first, second, and third legs in North America and Japan; "You Want This" was performed on the fourth and fifth legs in North America, Australia, and Asia; and "Whoops Now" was performed on the sixth leg in Europe.

== Tour dates ==
Date	City	Country	Venue
North America
November 24, 1993	Cincinnati	United States	Riverfront Coliseum
November 26, 1993	Toronto	Canada	SkyDome
November 28, 1993	Landover	United States	USAir Arena
November 29, 1993	Landover	United States	USAir Arena
December 1, 1993	Rosemont	United States	Rosemont Horizon
December 2, 1993	Minneapolis	United States	Target Center
December 4, 1993	Detroit	United States	Joe Louis Arena
December 17, 1993	New York City	United States	Madison Square Garden
December 18, 1993	New York City	United States	Madison Square Garden
December 22, 1993	New York City	United States	Madison Square Garden
December 23, 1993	New York City	United States	Madison Square Garden
December 28, 1993	Providence	United States	Providence Civic Center
December 30, 1993	Hartford	United States	Hartford Civic Center
December 31, 1993 (Note: Part of Janet's Live New Year Jam.)	New York City	United States	Madison Square Garden
January 3, 1994	Richfield	United States	Richfield Coliseum
January 5, 1994	Atlanta	United States	Omni Coliseum
January 6, 1994	Atlanta	United States	Omni Coliseum
January 9, 1994	Charlotte	United States	Charlotte Coliseum
January 12, 1994	Birmingham	United States	BJCC Coliseum
January 14, 1994	Richmond	United States	Richmond Coliseum
January 16, 1994	Knoxville	United States	Thompson–Boling Arena
January 18, 1994	Orlando	United States	Orlando Arena
January 20, 1994	Miami	United States	Miami Arena
January 22, 1994	St. Petersburg	United States	ThunderDome
January 24, 1994	Albany	United States	Knickerbocker Arena
January 30, 1994	Worcester	United States	Worcester Centrum
January 31, 1994	Philadelphia	United States	The Spectrum
February 3, 1994	Indianapolis	United States	Market Square Arena
February 4, 1994	Fairborn	United States	Nutter Center
February 6, 1994	Peoria	United States	Carver Arena
February 7, 1994	Milwaukee	United States	Bradley Center
February 11, 1994	Vancouver	Canada	Pacific Coliseum
February 12, 1994	Tacoma	United States	Tacoma Dome
February 16, 1994	San Jose	United States	San Jose Arena
February 17, 1994	Sacramento	United States	ARCO Arena
February 18, 1994	Oakland	United States	Oakland–Alameda County Coliseum Arena
February 24, 1994	San Diego	United States	San Diego Sports Arena
Asia
March 25, 1994	Sasebo	Japan	Huis Ten Bosch
March 27, 1994	Osaka	Japan	Osaka-jō Hall
March 29, 1994	Tokyo	Japan	Tokyo Dome
March 30, 1994	Tokyo	Japan	Tokyo Dome
North America
April 7, 1994	Inglewood	United States	Great Western Forum
April 8, 1994	Inglewood	United States	Great Western Forum
April 9, 1994	Inglewood	United States	Great Western Forum
April 14, 1994	San Jose	United States	San Jose Arena
April 16, 1994	Las Vegas	United States	MGM Grand Garden Special Events Center
April 17, 1994	Phoenix	United States	America West Arena
April 20, 1994	Cuyahoga Falls	United States	Blossom Music Center
April 22, 1994	Albuquerque	United States	Tingley Coliseum
April 23, 1994	Las Cruces	United States	Pan American Center
April 24, 1994	Denver	United States	McNichols Sports Arena
April 26, 1994 (Note: Originally scheduled for February 26, 1994.)	Salt Lake City	United States	Delta Center
April 27, 1994 (Note: Originally scheduled for February 27, 1994.)	Salt Lake City	United States	Delta Center
June 10, 1994	Columbia	United States	Merriweather Post Pavilion
June 11, 1994	Columbia	United States	Merriweather Post Pavilion
June 13, 1994	Vaughan	Canada	Kingswood Music Theatre
June 18, 1994	Mansfield	United States	Great Woods Center for the Performing Arts
June 21, 1994	Saratoga Springs	United States	Saratoga Performing Arts Center
June 23, 1994	Burgettstown	United States	Coca-Cola Star Lake Amphitheater
June 24, 1994	Philadelphia	United States	The Spectrum
June 26, 1994	Wantagh	United States	Jones Beach Amphitheater
June 27, 1994	Wantagh	United States	Jones Beach Amphitheater
June 30, 1994	Holmdel Township	United States	Garden State Arts Center
July 3, 1994	Hershey	United States	Hersheypark Stadium
July 5, 1994 (Note: This concert was a part of "Summerfest".)	Milwaukee	United States	Marcus Amphitheater
July 6, 1994	Moline	United States	The MARK of the Quad Cities
July 8, 1994	Bonner Springs	United States	Sandstone Amphitheater
July 9, 1994	Maryland Heights	United States	Riverport Amphitheatre
July 12, 1994	Hoffman Estates	United States	Poplar Creek Music Theater
July 13, 1994	Hoffman Estates	United States	Poplar Creek Music Theater
July 18, 1994	Clarkston	United States	Pine Knob Music Theatre
July 19, 1994	Richfield	United States	Richfield Coliseum
July 21, 1994	Cincinnati	United States	Riverbend Music Center
July 23, 1994	Noblesville	United States	Deer Creek Music Center
July 24, 1994	Columbus	United States	Polaris Amphitheater
July 26, 1994	New York City	United States	Radio City Music Hall
July 27, 1994	New York City	United States	Radio City Music Hall
July 29, 1994	Raleigh	United States	Hardee's Walnut Creek Amphitheatre
July 31, 1994	Atlanta	United States	Coca-Cola Lakewood Amphitheatre
August 1, 1994	New Orleans	United States	Louisiana Superdome
August 2, 1994	The Woodlands	United States	Cynthia Woods Mitchell Pavilion
August 3, 1994	Dallas	United States	Coca-Cola Starplex Amphitheatre
August 5, 1994	Greenwood Village	United States	Fiddler's Green Amphitheatre
August 9, 1994	Irvine	United States	Irvine Meadows Amphitheatre
August 10, 1994	San Bernardino	United States	Blockbuster Pavilion
August 12, 1994	Mountain View	United States	Shoreline Amphitheatre
August 14, 1994	George	United States	The Gorge Amphitheatre
Australia
February 6, 1995	Brisbane	Australia	Brisbane Entertainment Centre
February 7, 1995	Brisbane	Australia	Brisbane Entertainment Centre
February 10, 1995	Sydney	Australia	Sydney Entertainment Centre
February 11, 1995	Sydney	Australia	Sydney Entertainment Centre
February 12, 1995	Sydney	Australia	Sydney Entertainment Centre
February 15, 1995	Sydney	Australia	Sydney Entertainment Centre
February 17, 1995	Melbourne	Australia	National Tennis Centre
February 18, 1995	Melbourne	Australia	National Tennis Centre
February 20, 1995	Melbourne	Australia	National Tennis Centre
February 21, 1995	Adelaide	Australia	Adelaide Entertainment Centre
February 23, 1995	Perth	Australia	Perth Entertainment Centre
Asia
February 27, 1995	Kallang	Singapore	Singapore Indoor Stadium
February 28, 1995	Kallang	Singapore	Singapore Indoor Stadium
March 3, 1995	Manila	Philippines	Folk Arts Theater
March 5, 1995	Bangkok	Thailand	Indoor Stadium Huamark
March 6, 1995	Bangkok	Thailand	Indoor Stadium Huamark
Europe
March 8, 1995	Oslo	Norway	Oslo Spektrum
March 9, 1995	Copenhagen	Denmark	Forum Copenhagen
March 11, 1995	Stockholm	Sweden	Stockholm Globe Arena
March 14, 1995	Berlin	Germany	Arena Berlin
March 16, 1995	Hamburg	Germany	Alsterdorfer Sporthalle
March 21, 1995	Rotterdam	Netherlands	Sportpaleis
March 22, 1995	Rotterdam	Netherlands	Sportpaleis
March 25, 1995	Toulouse	France	Palais des Sports
March 26, 1995	Barcelona	Spain	Palau Sant Jordi
March 29, 1995	Marseille	France	Le Dôme de Marseille
March 31, 1995	Zürich	Switzerland	Hallenstadion
April 1, 1995	Munich	Germany	Olympiahalle
April 4, 1995	Sheffield	England	Sheffield Arena
April 7, 1995	Birmingham	England	NEC Arena
April 8, 1995	London	England	London Arena
April 10, 1995	Paris	France	Palais Omnisports de Paris-Bercy
April 11, 1995	Stuttgart	Germany	Hanns-Martin-Schleyer-Halle
April 13, 1995	Frankfurt	Germany	Festhalle
April 15, 1995	Dortmund	Germany	Große Westfalenhalle
April 16, 1995	Ghent	Belgium	Flanders Expo
April 19, 1995	London	England	Wembley Arena
April 20, 1995	London	England	Wembley Arena
April 22, 1995	London	England	Wembley Arena

== Box office score data ==
Venue	City	Tickets sold / available	Gross revenue
SkyDome	Toronto	17,737 / 18,000 (99%)	$506,042
Joe Louis Arena	Detroit	15,070 / 15,070 (100%)	$455,122
Madison Square Garden (Note: Box office score date composed of three concerts, taking place on December 17, 18 and 31, 1993.)	New York City	44,714 / 44,714 (100%)	$1,936,305
Charlotte Coliseum	Charlotte	11,999 / 23,302 (51%)	$332,972
BJCC Coliseum	Birmingham	7,650 / 10,846 (71%)	$212,288
Worcester Centrum	Worcester	12,681 / 13,128 (97%)	$372,821
The Spectrum	Philadelphia	15,513 / 15,513 (100%)	$467,204
Nutter Center	Fairborn	12,445 / 12,445 (100%)	$359,174
McNichols Sports Arena	Denver	12,891 / 13,327 (97%)	$421,436
Hersheypark Stadium	Hershey	13,904 / 23,000 (66%)	$356,642
Jones Beach Theater	Wantagh	21,658 / 21,658 (100%)	$846,215
Starplex Amphitheater	Dallas	13,368 / 20,111 (66%)	$304,283
Radio City Music Hall	New York City	11,134 / 11,828 (94%)	$618,060
The Gorge	George	11,605 / 13,500 (86%)	$330,811
Glen Halen Blockbuster Pavillion	Devore	11,484 / 13,829 (83%)	$274,464
Polaris Amphitheater	Columbus	10,362 / 20,000 (52%)	$251,618
TOTAL		244,215 / 290,121 (84.17%)	$8,045,457
