= Tina Landon =

American choreographer (born 1963)

- Born: January 6, 1963 (age 63); Lancaster, California, U. S.
- Occupation: Choreographer

Tina Landon (born January 6, 1963) is an American choreographer based in Los Angeles who has worked with Janet Jackson, Prince, Michael Jackson, Ciara, Tina Turner, Anastacia, Mýa, Shakira, Pink, Marc Anthony, Kristi Yamaguchi, Aerosmith, Jennifer Lopez, Christina Aguilera, Ricky Martin, Jay-Z, Pussycat Dolls, Britney Spears, and Aaliyah.

== Early life ==
While growing up in Lancaster, California, Landon studied jazz, ballet, and tap.

== Career ==
Landon began her dance career as a Laker Girl in the 1980s when Paula Abdul was their choreographer. In 1990, she toured as a dancer on Janet Jackson's Rhythm Nation 1814 Tour. She went on to choreograph the janet. World Tour in 1993 and The Velvet Rope World Tour in 1998 for which she received an Emmy nomination for Outstanding Achievement In Choreography. At the 1999 MTV Video Music Awards upon winning the Best Dance Video award for Livin' la Vida Loca, Ricky Martin called Landon onstage and passed the award to her (she choreographed the video). At the 2000 ALMA Awards, one of her former dancers, Jennifer Lopez presented Landon with an Achievement in Choreography award. Before accepting the award, Landon and a troupe of her dancers performed a medley of some of her best known work. In 2004, she was nominated for an American Choreography Award for her work on the Will & Grace episode "I Do/Oh No You Di-int". In 2008 she appeared on the reality dance competition Step It Up and Dance during which she taught the contestants the routine she choreographed for Rihanna's music video "Umbrella". In September 2009, Landon and several other choreographers danced with Janet at the 2009 MTV Video Music Awards to the song "Scream", which Landon originally choreographed, as a tribute to Michael Jackson. Other choreographers who participated in the performance included Dave Scott, Jeri Slaughter, Tyce Diorio, Laurie Ann Gibson, Cris Judd, Travis Payne, Brian Friedman and Gil Duldulao.

== Teaching ==
Landon teaches master classes at The Millennium Dance Complex in North Hollywood and at Triple Threat Dance convention in Canada. She appeared as an instructor in two fitness DVDs hosted by Eric Nies: The Grind Workout: Fitness With Flava (1995) and The Grind Workout: Strength and Fitness (1996). She has also released one instructional dance DVD based on her music video choreography called Behind the Moves: Session 1 (2003).

== Awards ==
- 2001 - American Choreography Award for Best Music Video Choreography: Mýa's "Case of the Ex"
- 2000 - Music Video Producers Association Award for Best Choreography: Ricky Martin - Livin' La Vida Loca
- 2000 - ALMA Award Honoree for Achievement in Choreography
- 1999 - Dance Master's of America 115th Choreographer of the Year Award
- 1999 - American Choreography Award for Best Music Video Choreography: Ricky Martin - Livin' La Vida Loca
- 1999 - MTV Video Music Award for Best Dance Video: Ricky Martin's "Livin' la Vida Loca"
- 1995 - MTV Video Music Award for Best Choreography: Michael and Janet Jackson's "Scream"
