= Aashiqui (album) =

Compilation album by Jassi Sidhu
- Released: 2005
- Genre: Bhangra
- Length: 37 Minutes
- Label: MovieBox

Jassi Sidhu chronology
Reality Check (2004)	Aashiqui (2005)	No Strings Attached (2005)

Professional ratings
Review scores
Source	Rating
Desiest	(7.28/10)

Aashiqui is the greatest hits album of Punjabi singer, Jassi Sidhu, released in 2005. After a solid debut with Reality Check, Jassi Sidhu released his old songs recorded with his old band, B21. The prime purpose of releasing this album was to introduce his older hits to the Indian audience, who was enjoying his debut album, Reality Check. As Jassi Sidhu was an unknown face to the Indian audience, it was a perfect move by the label, and it proved to be really successful. Album was both critically and commercially acclaimed.

== Changes in the new tracks ==
To make the album more appealing, Jassi Sidhu went to the studio to record the songs again. Three songs; Chandigarh, Din Raat, and Deor Da Viah were recorded with new effects, and music but resembling to the earlier versions. For example; the introduction of Chandigarh (Aashiqui) was different from the earlier version but rest of the structure of the song was almost same. The names of the tracks were also changed.

Chandigarh was named Aashiqui, Din Raat was changed to Majajne, Deor Da Viah was renamed to Bhabhi. Other tracks; Khote Te, Chitia Kipha Dia, Putt Sardaran Da and Darshan were changed into Raat, Hasya Kare, Dil Lutiya and Din, respectively.

== Track listing ==
Aashiqui
No.	Title	Length
1.	"Aashiqui"	5:17
2.	"Majajne"	4:45
3.	"Jaan"	4:18
4.	"Raat"	5:21
5.	"Dil Lutiya"	4:31
6.	"Bhabhi"	4:42
7.	"Hasya Kare"	4:08
8.	"Din"	4:51
