= The Velvet Rope Tour =

1998–99 concert tour by Janet Jackson

- Tour by Janet Jackson
- The tour's promotional advertisement drew controversy and was banned from numerous publications
- Associated album: The Velvet Rope
- Start date: April 16, 1998
- End date: January 30, 1999
- Legs: 6
- No. of shows: 125
- Box office: US$33.1 million ($65.38 million in 2025 dollars)

Janet Jackson concert chronology
- Janet World Tour (1993–95); The Velvet Rope Tour (1998–99); All for You Tour (2001–02)

The Velvet Rope Tour was the third concert tour by American recording artist Janet Jackson. Launched in support of her sixth studio album The Velvet Rope (1997), the tour visited Europe, North America, Japan, New Zealand, Africa, and Australia. Jackson was inspired to create an autobiographical show using elements of Broadway theatre, portraying her struggle with depression and self-esteem. The tour's stage production was developed as a storybook setting, allowing spectators to cross beyond her "velvet rope" and experience her life story through the evolution of her musical career. It consists of twenty-six songs, several band interludes, and intense choreography along with nine costume changes and four sets. Jackson depicts themes such as burlesque and domestic violence among the show's complex production of pyrotechnics and theatrics.

Its setlist was composed of a wide array of Jackson's discography, focusing on new material in addition to medleys of previous hits. The tour is divided into five segments, each displaying different themes and settings. In "What About", Its racy visuals and depictions of violence drew controversy. In her rendition of "Rope Burn", Jackson selects a fan from the audience, performing a lap dance and kissing them while strapped into a chair. The show's suggestive promotional ads were banned from a number of publications, the image was reported to cause traffic accidents in Europe. A number of reviews commended Jackson's stage presence as consistently exceptional, noting improvement in her vocal delivery. It broke several attendance records and is the most attended stadium concert of all time in Hawaii. A private show was held in Brunei by request of Princess Hamidah, for her thirty-first birthday.

HBO broadcast the show during a special titled The Velvet Rope: Live in Madison Square Garden. It drew over 15 million viewers and was the most watched program among homes subscribed to the network. The special won an Emmy Award, and was also nominated for Image Awards and TMF Awards. It was released on DVD as The Velvet Rope Tour – Live in Concert, certified platinum in several territories. Various aspects of the tour have influenced numerous performers, including Britney Spears, Pink, Rihanna, Christina Aguilera, Panic! at the Disco, Jay-Z, and Arashi. Jackson notably selected NSYNC and Usher to open for the tour; introducing both to the public during their early careers. It has also inspired the careers of several performers, dancers, and professional choreographers.

== Development ==
Jackson developed the tour as an audiovisual storybook, sharing her life experience through the evolution of her music. Catherine McHugh of Entertainment Design reports "Part of the reason Janet Jackson titled her latest record The Velvet Rope was to criticize barriers that separate different classes in society. So from the beginning of her show, Jackson strives to prove her accessibility to her audience. The spectacular opening presents Jackson's life—at least professionally—as an open book." The stage was designed by Mark Fisher, saying "She wanted to have a book opening and herself come out of it. So I finessed that book into the video screen." Fisher explained, "Each different scene in the show would be akin to turning the pages in this book, and all the albums that she'd done in the past—Control, Rhythm Nation, janet.—would be represented." Regarding its introduction, Fisher said, "The elevator deposits her gracefully, as befits a princess, on the very front of the downstage." "And of course, the entirely cool and wonderful and breaking-new-ground aspect of it is that it's all made possible by a thin LED screen." Roy Bennett stated "We talked about developing the show around the scenarios of her career. I kept that in mind while lighting each different scene, but I tried to do it in an abstract way, without jumping too far away from the overall look of the show."

Jackson said, "To me, being onstage is about entertaining. I know there are people who just walk onstage and give you a show by just doing their music, but I always wanted something extra." Jackson conceptualized the tour in Paris, saying "I knew what I wanted everyone to look like, especially for the opening number. I knew what I wanted everyone to wear. I visualized the whole thing." Jackson desired to create new themes for prior hits to avoid repeating previous performances. The tour's logo is a variation of Akan symbol the Sankofa, meaning "you can't move into the future until you understand your past." Jackson tattooed the symbol onto her wrist and used the image frequently throughout the tour's promotional imagery.

== Concert synopsis ==
The show's setlist consists of twenty-six songs, several band interludes and over twenty dance numbers, along with nine costume changes and four different sets, in addition to frequent pyrotechnics and theatrics. At the beginning of the show, burgundy curtains accented by golden tassels are drawn apart, exposing an enormous book. It is covered by an equally large quilt embossed with "The Velvet Rope." A master of ceremonies opens the book, revealed to be an LED screen. The screen shows a nighttime sky with stars and planets. The images dance across the screen, gaining in speed until pyrotechnics explode and the screen splits, revealing Jackson behind it. She is subsequently lowered by elevator onto the main stage and the book stand is removed, leaving the screen hanging in place. It then moves to the back of the stage, followed by the appearance of the band and dancers.

Jackson is dressed in a top hat and velvet suit, resembling a "19th century British merchant", and along with eight dancers, performs the opening number "Velvet Rope", using a refrain of The Exorcist theme. After transitioning into "If", Jackson stares at the audience in silence for several minutes to cheering and applause before performing "You." Jackson is backed by dancers strutting alongside her wearing dual-sided masks, representing an isolated persona. Jackson then takes to a center stage stool to perform unplugged versions of "Let's Wait Awhile" and "Again" with her and an guitarist playing acoustic guitars. A "frenzied" medley of hits from Control succeeds the ballads, including "Control", "The Pleasure Principle", "What Have You Done for Me Lately", and "Nasty", as well as janet.'s erotic house number "Throb." The red velvet curtain closes the stage while a "hidden light-and sound show" likened to extraterrestrial film Close Encounters entertains the crowd during set changes. The stage reveals the "deranged madness" of the following "hallucinatory" segment, featuring Jackson in a jester's headdress and satin bustier, with dancers dressed as "flowers, Mad Hatters, and horny gnomes" in a "Wonderland" setting. Jackson performs an upbeat medley of "Escapade", "When I Think of You", "Miss You Much", "Runaway", and "Love Will Never Do (Without You)" across a "blindingly bright, poppy-induced set design" with varied props, which include a smiling clock tower, inflatable moons, mammoth chaise, vases, and books.

The set transitions into a "steamy burlesque house" with a succession of "Alright", "I Get Lonely", and instrumental interlude of "Any Time, Any Place." Jackson strips to a black bra and tight pants during "Rope Burn", selecting a participant from the crowd at random, "pointing and demanding, "You!". The chosen fan is strapped into a chair as Jackson proceeds to pole dance and perform a striptease and lap dance, planting a kiss on the fan for the finale. "Black Cat" is followed by an emotionally charged rendition of the rock-influenced "What About", one of the tour's most controversial and praised renditions. Jackson narrates as four dancers demonstrate two vignettes of domestic violence in abusive relationships, including rape and physical abuse, concluding in a gun pulled on the abusers in self-defense. Proceeding is "Rhythm Nation", in which Jackson rapidly dances using martial arts movements and nunchucks, followed by the ballad "Special." The tour's encore includes chandeliers and a final outfit change, performing "That's the Way Love Goes", "Got 'til It's Gone", and "Go Deep" before concluding with "Together Again." Piano ballad "Every Time" and "Whoops Now" were performed exclusively on selected international dates.

== Critical reception ==
"The title of Janet Jackson's current album, The Velvet Rope, is intended to describe the emotional obstacles she perceives to exist in modern relationships, and to invite her fans behind her personal veil of the senses. There was not much chance to get up close and personal with Jackson last Thursday when she started her world tour, as thousands of screaming admirers muscled in on the act. The feeling was more like being welcomed into her customized entertainment complex."

— Paul Sexton, The Times

The tour was highly praised by critics. Sean Daly of Rolling Stone commended the show's "Vegas-style glam" and Jackson's "pure showmanship" as providing "a hellzapoppin' spectacle that featured enough over-the-top special effects to make Armageddon look like Driving Miss Daisy." The concert was considered "a lust-driven fairy tale", featuring "a giant storybook, containing a massive video screen" which opened and closed the show. Its varied themes were contrasted with psychiatric thrillers A Clockwork Orange and Solid Gold, being "as damn freaky as it sounds", using a color scheme described as "a well-lighted explosion at the Crayola factory." The show's second segment was analyzed as "deranged madness", questioning "Can this really be little Penny from Good Times?" Daly praised Jackson's "breakneck speed" and favorably considered it "summer-entertainment bliss", adding "Janet's still as nasty as she wants to be."

Sean Piccoli of The Sun Sentinel applauded the tour as a "birth of a new form of entertainment", effectively taking "music-video fundamentalism to a new extreme in live performance." Jackson's "athletic, superchoreographed presentation" was considered "sheery sensory thrill", thought to have "made Spice World look like public theater." The show was analyzed to be "as much a broadcast as it was a show", transitioning through "a seamless whirl of songs, costumes and set changes." Jackson's performances were described as a "technicolor barrage", ranging from "punched-up, steely grooves" to "pillowy, whispered ballads." Piccoli declared highlights to include the opening number, "an eerie incantation on the strangeness and isolation of celebrity", and the "explosively colorful" Control medley incorporating themes of "children's theater." The tour's rendition of "Rope Burn", showcasing Jackson as she "coaxed a young man from the audience onstage for a veritable striptease routine – for which the fellow was strapped by wristbands to his seat", was also praised. However, the show's unplugged ballad segment was thought to be "the evening's most unadorned moment." Piccoli added the crowd's "animated cheering" had been the most the arena had mustered in his experience.

Robert Hilburn of The Los Angeles Times favorably reviewed the tour, exclaiming "There is so much of the ambition and glamour of a Broadway musical in Janet Jackson's new Velvet Rope Tour that it's only fitting that the concert program credits her as the show's creator and director." Although "those aren't terms normally employed in the pop-rock world", Hilburn applauded Jackson's credibility in portraying "a dazzling package, complete with snappy choreography, a colorful array of costumes and often striking staging." Hilburn observed "there were several moments in the show when Jackson stepped beyond the production values and touched us in a way the best pop performers have done over the years." Emphasis was placed on the "playfulness of the fairy tale staging" of "Escapade", the "artful musical stretch" of "Got 'Til It's Gone", and the intimacy of "soul-searching" ballad "Special", adding "Jackson has put a personal stamp on this show that humanizes not only the music but also the performer too." Jackson's "radiance and warmth" was believed to be the result of "her own new-found self esteem", overcoming some of the insecurities plaguing her since childhood. Hilburn stated "the tour and album should go a long way toward helping Jackson finally get the credit she deserves as an artist."

The tour's "computer design-phase" was considered "a marvel of precision" by Tom Moon of The Inquirer. Its "eerie, robotic aura of a video game" was thought to be complemented by pyrotechnics detonated "At all the right, surprising moments", a troupe of "lockstep" dancers likened to "a phalanx of marching insects", and "stylized stage sets", ranging from "a child's nursery to a swing-era street scene." The show's lengthy "high-concept medleys" and "power-as-aphrodisiac theme" where analyzed to be commanding and accentuated her physical presence, ripping off her blouse with "theatrical grandeur." Additionally, Jackson's rapid "clockwork" movement was thought to be "high price", declared as nearly mechanical in certain segments. Moon declared "The audience cheered throughout the lavish production; the glossy, every-note-in-its-place music hardly mattered: This was Janet, the noted control freak. The sexually ambiguous diva. The drill sergeant of the rhythm nation. She can do as she pleases."

Paul Sexton of The Times, who reviewed the opening concert at the Rotterdam Ahoy in Rotterdam, Netherlands, compared her two-hour performance to that of Broadway theatre, calling it "an audiovisual banquet." Her vocal performance was complemented, as Let's Wait Awhile and "Again" "both showcased Janet's ability to belt out heartfelt, if slightly soppy ballads." Richard Harrington of The Washington Post commented "Jackson looked fabulous, danced fabulous, sang as close to fabulous as she ever has and in the end provided a fabulous two hours of entertainment that was equal parts rock concert, Las Vegas revue and Broadway musical." Steve Jones of USA Today remarked, "Janet Jackson had a sellout crowd for the kickoff of her first U.S. tour in four years, and she blew the fans away with imaginative staging and sheer exuberance." J. D. Considine of The Baltimore Sun noted "on albums, Jackson's sound isn't defined by her voice so much as by the way her voice is framed by the lush, propulsive production of Jimmy Jam and Terry Lewis ... her singing on "Black Cat" was commanding enough to hold its own against the wailing electric guitar."

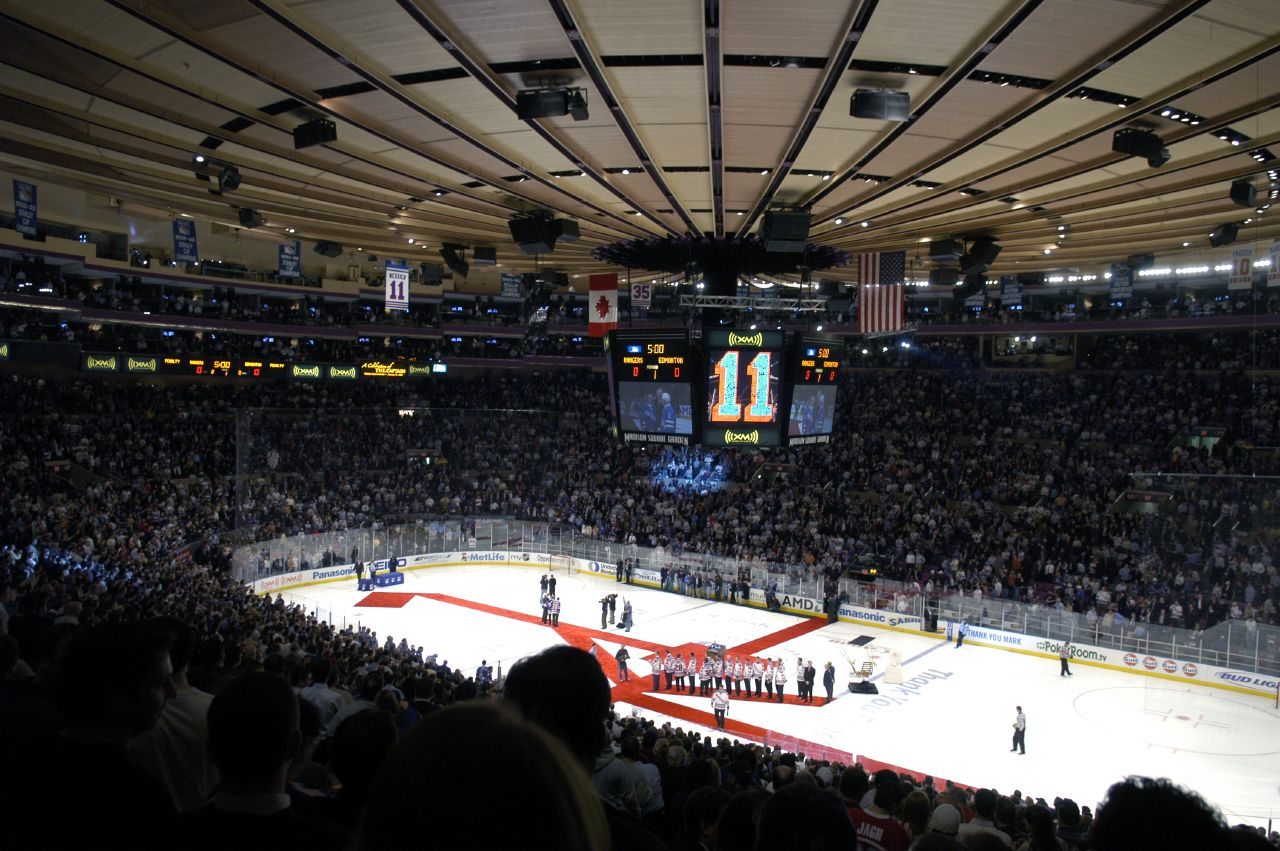
The tour's date at Madison Square Garden (pictured) in New York City was filmed and aired on HBO, drawing fifteen million viewers.

Natasha Kassulke of the Wisconsin State Journal stated "The concert captured the scope of Jackson's talent from songwriter to singer, producer, actress, dancer and fashion diva." Similarly, Gemma Tarlach of the Milwaukee Journal Sentinel observed, "A tiny dynamo of constant motion, Jackson strutted, slunk and grooved her way from one end of the stage to the other ... Her voice, sometimes thin and girlish on her albums, sounded fuller and more powerful than ever." Kevin Johnson of St. Louis Post-Dispatch commended the tour as "one of the flashiest on the concert scene." Elizabeth Aird, who reviewed Jackson's concert at GM Place, wrote "If there's a show sexier and more polished than Janet Jackson's The Velvet Rope extravaganza, it's only on Broadway ... Saturday night's show at GM Place was two hours of thrills pumped out by Jackson, her never-say-die dancers and her powerful band."

James Sullivan of the San Francisco Chronicle observed her concert at the new arena "offered a career retrospective, punctuated by new material, periodic video diversions and fireworks." "The show was a lot like an '80s flashback, though to its credit Jackson's eight-piece band—bass, guitar, drums and percussion, two keyboardists and two backup singers—added some inventive layering to her older hits." Charles Passy of the Palm Beach Post reported Jackson's show at the Coral Sky Amphitheatre emphasized style over substance, commenting her "two-hour set was about half hormones—and half pyrotechnics. Without much in the way of a voice, she has sold her persona throughout her career. And as that persona has evolved from girlish teenager to sexually sophisticated woman, her albums—and tours—have provided a road map." Jet Magazine reported, "With wit, sass, dance and a whole lot of sex appeal, Janet turns her song and dance fest into one of the major musical events of the year. In fact, it has become the must-see concert of the year."

Jeannine Etter of Youth Outlook stated "Janet takes us from ballads to hard-core dance beats, and from sex to politics. The set changes appropriately reflect some of the stages of her musical development, from the more playful circus/funhouse vibe of light and playful songs like "Escapade" to the sexual side of Janet's music that keeps getting stronger and stronger as the years go by. During the performance, one lucky man is picked from the audience, strapped to a chair and "tortured" as Janet performs a highly erotic dance for him." The excerpt concluded "Janet is extremely beautiful, but she also demonstrates a humility obtained from pain, reflection and a sense of spirituality." Christine Robertson of Evening Post, who reviewed Jackson's concert in Wellington, New Zealand, exclaimed: "The sleek choreography and superb dance spectacle saw Jackson seldom take a breath from one set to the next—her control of the stage complete. Most of the time she plunged into two decades of hits which give her the right to stand her ground" among her contemporaries. Jane Stevenson of The Toronto Sun exclaimed "pyrotechnics, set pieces and inflatables combine with non-stop singing and dancing for two hours of exhilarating entertainment."

== Commercial reception ==
The tour's premiere concert at the Joe Louis Arena sold out within three hours, prompting Jackson to add a second showing for a later date. It grossed over $33 million in the United States alone. Its European leg had completely sold out. The tour had an estimated worldwide attendance of nearly two million, reported to exceed ten million by The Honolulu Advertiser. The tour's closing date at the Aloha Stadium in Hawaii broke attendance records, exceeding its original capacity to accommodate additional ticket demands, making Jackson the only artist in the venue's history to do so. Jackson donated a portion of the tour's sales to America's Promise, an organization founded by Colin Powell to assist disenfranchised youth.

== Controversy ==
The tour's promotional advertisements were controversial for their provocative imagery. The image depicts Jackson in a "clingy, breast-enhancing bodysuit with what appears to be a nipple ring on the bodysuit's exterior and high-cut bikini panties." Several publications refused to publish the ad when they could not determine a way to present the image. Ken DeLisa, corporate affairs manager of The Courant, said the photo did not meet the publication's standards. Jackson's spokeswoman said the tour's producers rejected proposed alterations, adding certain publications "sent back an image that colored Janet's bosom to appear as a sports bra." A billboard of the image in England was also removed after its suggestive nature led to multiple traffic accidents. The tour drew comparisons to Madonna's 1993 Girlie Show Tour, and the UK's Q magazine commented that Jackson borrowed some elements from her pop adversary for her tour.

The tour's rendition of "Rope Burn" was considered "incredibly sexy" and "what everyone was talking about", becoming its most controversial performance. During the act, Jackson "plucks a male fan out of the crowd and ties his hands to the arms of a chair on stage while she gyrates around him and eventually kisses him." The selected fan was required to be strapped into the chair due to safety concerns from Jackson's previous tour, after the participant had forcefully grabbed and fondled her while onstage. Jackson said, "Everyone thinks it's this kinky thing. But the reason he gets strapped in is on this last tour, this guy grabbed my crotch. I sat on his lap and then I stood up and he grabbed my crotch, and I was trying to move his hand and he was too strong for me and he was just rubbing on my crotch. There was nothing I could do, so I said to myself I would never let that happen again." Jackson's performance of "What About" is also infamous for its portrayal of domestic violence and abuse. The tour's "racy" costumes were designed by fashion designer David Cardona, who commented "All her life it's been about Janet being cute. Now it's about Janet being sexy."

== Broadcast and recordings ==
The show's concert in New York City was broadcast on the HBO special The Velvet Rope: Live in Madison Square Garden. It received over 15 million viewers and surpassed the ratings of all four major networks among viewers subscribed to the channel. It was released on DVD as The Velvet Rope Tour: Live in Concert, certified platinum in the United States and Australia. Selected performance footage was also aired on MTV. A live music video for promotional single "You" contains concert footage filmed in Glasgow and Manchester.

A promotional interview disc in which Jackson answers thirty-four tour questions was released in Europe. A special edition double disc set was issued to Best Buy stores in Germany in other parts of Europe, including a seventeen-minute interview and tour photo book. Its second disc features thirteen songs selected by Jackson, mainly of the trip hop genre, including Massive Attack, Esthero, and Dario G.

== Legacy ==
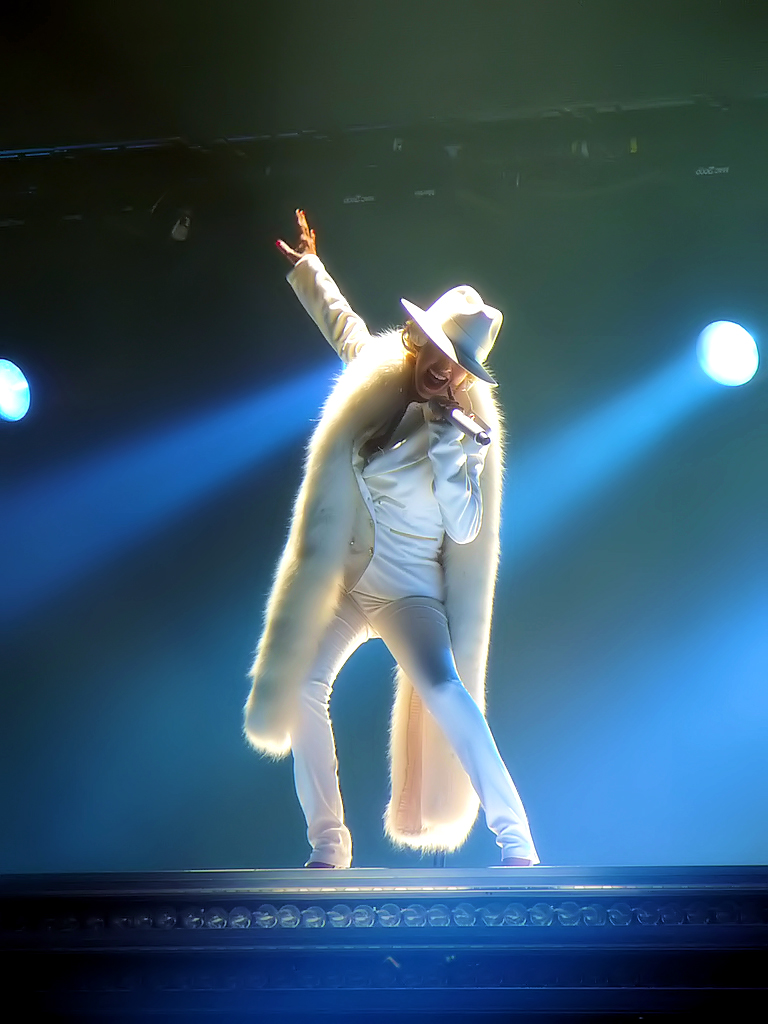
Critics have observed Christina Aguilera has been influenced by the tour.

The tour's themes, performances and choreography, have influenced artists of various genres as well as several professional dancers and choreographers. The theme of Pink's Funhouse Tour was likened to Jackson's Velvet Rope Tour among several critics, considered to have "clearly learned her tricks" from studying Jackson's performances. In particular, Pink's rendition of the Divinyls' "I Touch Myself", depicting "a masturbatory fantasy brought to life", was considered "instantly" reminiscent of "Janet's Velvet Rope gropes." Christina Aguilera cited the tour as an inspiration, saying "I just love watching people's performance videos. And she, being an amazing performer ... I aspire to do my little shows like that one day." The "flashy Roberto Cavalli-designed costumes and preternatural interest in the risqué" of Aguilera's Back to Basics Tour were later considered "ripped right off the pages" of Jackson's Velvet Rope Tour by LA Daily News. The stage and props of Cher's Do You Believe? shows drew comparisons to Jackson's tour. MTV News likened the circus theme, costumes, and atmosphere of Panic! at the Disco's Nothing Rhymes with Circus Tour to have "most closely resembled Janet Jackson's audience-dividing, hypersexual 1998 Velvet Rope tour — all that was missing was a chair dance." The carnival theme and theatrics used in Japanese group Arashi's Arashi Marks 2008 Dream-A-Live shows were compared to Jackson's festival setting from the tour.

The tour was among the first concerts attended by Britney Spears, who commented "I remember the first time I went to her show, I was just like 'Oh my God,' I wanted to be her." Spears added, "she just has this presence that you're so drawn to her, you can't keep your eyes off her." Spears' rendition of "Stronger" on the Dream Within a Dream Tour referenced Jackson's performance of "You", performing in a similar vein among masked dancers wearing one-piece attire. Several performances and themes of Spears' Onyx Hotel Tour drew comparisons for its choreography and sensuality, as well as a reworked lounge version of "Baby One More Time" sonically reminiscent of Jackson's "Rope Burn." Spears' following tour The Circus Starring Britney Spears used a circus theme, observed to be partially inspired by segments of the tour. During "Lace and Leather" on the Femme Fatale Tour, Spears performed a lap dance for a selected fan while wearing a boa after a pole dance, considered a direct reference to Jackson's performance of "Rope Burn." An analysis of Rihanna's Last Girl on Earth tour observed there was "definitely a Janet vibe", particularly comparing Jackson's performance of "Rope Burn", "in which she tied an audience member to a bed and proceeded to seduce them", to Rihanna's rendition of "Skin." The critique added, "Fast forward 13 years later, and there was Rihanna, writhing around on a lucky audience member at the conclusion of Skin off her current Loud album." New Zealand's Stuff.co.nz praised Lady Gaga's Born This Way Ball as the best "pop-star show" since Jackson's Velvet Rope Tour.

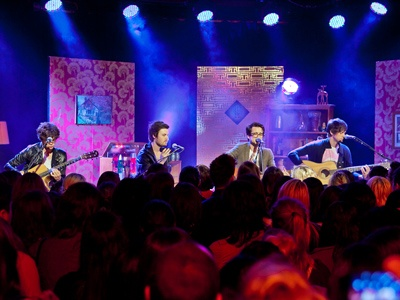
Tours from Panic! at the Disco drew comparisons to Jackson's show.

In a documentary, Jay-Z revealed being inspired by a segment of Jackson's tour in which she stood in silence and stared at the crowd for several minutes to massive applause; imitating the technique during his own concerts. Beyoncé has also been reported to emulate a similar tactic during several live shows. JoJo praised the tour, tweeting "Janet Jackson Velvet Rope Tour DVD. Freaking out. Mesmerized. Living. Can't stop yelling at the tv screen. Omg." JoJo later recorded the album Agápē while The Velvet Rope Tour played on a studio television for inspiration. Canadian singer Anjulie became "obsessed with music" and "developed [my style] through watching" the tour, recalling "I remember seeing The Velvet Rope Tour and then getting the VHS of that, putting it on slow motion so that I could learn every single dance move." British artist Rowdy Superstar commended Jackson's performance of "If" and "stayed up the whole night learning all the choreography from the Velvet Rope Tour." BBC Asian Network presenter DJ Kayper called Jackson "hands down, the best female performer of all time", praising the tour's rendition of "Rhythm Nation" in which Jackson dances with nunchucks.

Jackson's performance of "Rope Burn" has influenced numerous artists to incorporate a similar routine during live shows. An anecdote stated "Her performance of this song, when she brought a fan on stage for a strip tease during The Velvet Rope Tour has been co-opted by the likes of Britney Spears and Rihanna in later years." Other artists observed to be inspired by the rendition include Pink, Beyoncé, Christina Aguilera, the Sugababes, Katy Perry, Nicki Minaj, and Chris Brown. Nicole Brown of Vibe stated "Long before Rihanna and Nicki were handing out lap dances like hot cakes, Miss Jackson revolutionized dirty dancing with her "Rope Burn" routine in 1998. Janet works her way up and down a pole before laying a passionate kiss on an excited male fan." A critique of Chris Brown's Fan Appreciation Tour remarked "Brown isn't the only celeb getting freaky on stage with their fans, singer Janet Jackson was one of the first celebrities to get freaky with fans on a stage in front of thousands of on-lookers." Katy Perry was also thought to emulate the performance on the California Dreams Tour, in which she brought a male onstage and "teasingly traced a finger down his bare chest and stomach." The Guardian observed influence from Jackson in the Sugababes' performance of "Virgin Sexy" on the Angels with Dirty Faces Tour, "in which they lapdance around the sole member of the audience who is male and in his twenties", adding "It's a trick Janet Jackson did a few years ago, on her Velvet Rope tour." In 2013, Wall Street International reported the performance inspired American artist (who was exhibiting I London at the time), Alex Da Corte's painting "Velveteen (Wilson Kelvin McQuade)", offering the analogy "a lap dance performed by one artwork for another may be crass, yet too fitting to be ignored."

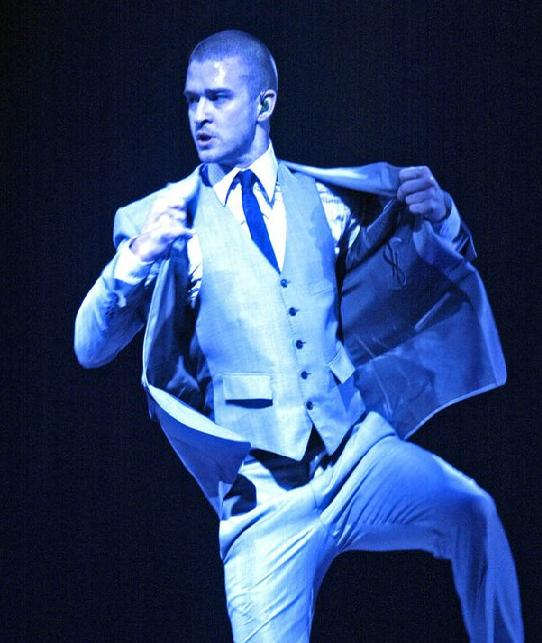
Jackson sought out Justin Timberlake to open for the tour during his early career as a member of 'N Sync.

The tour notably promoted Justin Timberlake and Usher when Jackson selected both as its opening acts during their early careers, exposing them to a wider audience. Both artists credit Jackson as a major showmanship influence from both "an entertainment and evolution perspective." While Timberlake was part of 'N Sync, Jackson personally selected them to open for the tour, helping to introduce the relatively unknown group to the public. Timberlake said "I had her poster on my wall so I'm psyched", later describing the experience as "fulfilling." Jackson performed with the group on several dates, including joining them for a live a cappella rendition of Stevie Wonder's "Overjoyed." A biography stated it was a "highlight" moment for Timberlake which "gave Justin a chance to show his family and friends how far he had come." The tour was the largest audience the group performed for at the time, with JC Chasez commenting, "That was great because we got to see how a real professional tours. And not only that she is really sweet. We really enjoyed it." Chris Kirkpatrick added, "She is very good at entertaining. We learned a lot — that if people want to hear just the music, they can buy the CD. But it's the whole live aspect of changing the songs every night or the whole theatrical performance that she puts on. She's definitely one of our mentors when it comes to touring and the stage show. Her show told a story, and that's what people like to see." Following the tour, Timberlake and Jackson became "good friends", ultimately leading to Timberlake performing alongside Jackson during a segment of Jackson's controversial Super Bowl Halftime Show performance. Usher described opening for Jackson as "the biggest event" of his career and an "honor", saying "She's a definite entertainer, works hard and sweats every night. I learned a lot about how to make an artist look like a star." Nick Lachey and group 98 Degrees opened for several dates and experienced increased commercial success following the tour.

The tour was one of the first concerts to feature split-screen LED technology, among the first developed at the time. Dancer and choreographer Teresa Espinosa began her career on the tour and credits Jackson for her success, leading her to subsequently work with Britney Spears, Pink, Rihanna, Mariah Carey, and Selena Gomez. Espinosa stated "it was a great learning experience, she's the top of the top," commenting "Dance-wise, (she taught me) how to become a better dancer and performer, and that you also have your good and bad days. Most of all you can't take things personally." Backing dancer Tiana Brown was inspired to pursue a professional dancing career after watching the tour. So You Think You Can Dance finalist Jessica King included the tour among her "favorite dance moments." It was also the first concert attended by So You Think You Can Dance choreographer Travis Wall. Choreographer Shaun Evaristo cited the tour as an inspiration, saying "That show changed my life and so did the dancers."

== Awards and nominations ==
The Velvet Rope Tour was nominated for 4 Emmy Awards.

List of accolades for "The Velvet Rope Tour"

Award	Nominated work	Result
Emmy Awards	Outstanding Technical Direction/Camera/Video for a Special	Won
Emmy Awards	Outstanding Choreography	Nominated
Emmy Awards	Outstanding Lighting Direction (Electronic) for a Drama Series, Variety Series, Miniseries, Movie or a Special	Nominated
Emmy Awards	Outstanding Music Direction	Nominated
Image Awards	Outstanding Variety Series/Special	Won
Image Awards	Outstanding Performance in a Variety Series/Special	Won
Performance Magazine Awards	Creative Stage Set of the Year	Won
TMF Awards	Best Live Act	Nominated
World Music Awards	Legend Award for Outstanding Contribution to Pop Music	Won

== Set list ==
Set list adapted per the official track listing of The Velvet Rope Tour: Live in Concert.

1. "Velvet Rope"
2. "If"
3. "You"
4. "Let's Wait Awhile" / "Again"
5. "Control" / "The Pleasure Principle" / "What Have You Done for Me Lately" / "Nasty"
6. "Throb"
7. "Escapade" / "When I Think of You" / "Miss You Much" / "Runaway" / "Love Will Never Do (Without You)"
8. "Alright"
9. "I Get Lonely"
10. "Any Time, Any Place" (Interlude)
11. "Rope Burn"
12. "Black Cat"
13. "What About"
14. "Jungle Boogie" (Interlude)
15. "Rhythm Nation"
16. "Special"
17. "That's the Way Love Goes"
18. "Got 'til It's Gone"
19. "Go Deep"
20. "Together Again"

=== Notes ===
- "Every Time" and "Whoops Now" were performed during select shows.
- During the second show in New York City, Q-Tip joined Jackson onstage to perform "Got 'til It's Gone".

== Tour dates ==
Date	City	Country	Venue	Opening act(s)
Europe
April 16, 1998	Rotterdam	Netherlands	Rotterdam Ahoy	Another Level
April 17, 1998	Rotterdam	Netherlands	Rotterdam Ahoy	Another Level
April 19, 1998	Ghent	Belgium	Flanders Expo	Another Level
Asia
April 22, 1998 (Note: Jackson performed a private show by request of Princess Hamidah of the Brunei royal family, for the princess' 21st birthday. An exclusive audio recording of the show was issued to attendees.)	Bandar Seri Begawan	Brunei	Jerudong Park Amphitheater	All Saints
Europe
April 29, 1998	Paris	France	Palais Omnisports de Paris-Bercy	Another Level
May 1, 1998	Munich	Germany	Olympiahalle	Another Level
May 3, 1998	Vienna	Austria	Wiener Stadthalle	Another Level
May 5, 1998	Milan	Italy	FilaForum	Another Level
May 7, 1998	Stuttgart	Germany	Hanns-Martin-Schleyer-Halle	Another Level
May 8, 1998	Frankfurt	Germany	Festhalle Frankfurt	Another Level
May 9, 1998	Leipzig	Germany	Messehalle	Another Level
May 11, 1998	Copenhagen	Denmark	Forum Copenhagen	Another Level
May 13, 1998	Turku	Finland	HK Arena	Another Level
May 15, 1998	Oslo	Norway	Oslo Spektrum	Another Level
May 16, 1998	Stockholm	Sweden	Stockholm Globe Arena	Another Level
May 17, 1998	Gothenburg	Sweden	Scandinavium	Another Level
May 19, 1998	Berlin	Germany	Velodrom	Another Level
May 20, 1998	Dortmund	Germany	Westfalenhallen	Another Level
May 22, 1998	Zürich	Switzerland	Hallenstadion	Another Level
May 24, 1998	Toulon	France	Zénith Oméga de Toulon	Another Level
May 26, 1998	Lyon	France	Halle Tony Garnier	Another Level
May 27, 1998	Ghent	Belgium	Flanders Expo	Another Level
May 29, 1998	Birmingham	England	NEC Arena	Another Level
May 30, 1998	Newcastle	England	Telewest Arena	Another Level
May 31, 1998	Manchester	England	Manchester Evening News Arena	Another Level
June 3, 1998	Glasgow	Scotland	SEC Centre	Another Level
June 4, 1998	Sheffield	England	Sheffield Arena	Another Level
June 6, 1998	London	England	Wembley Arena	Another Level
June 7, 1998	London	England	Wembley Arena	Another Level
June 9, 1998	Arnhem	Netherlands	GelreDome	Another Level
June 11, 1998	Hamburg	Germany	Alsterdorfer Sporthalle	Another Level
June 12, 1998	Hamburg	Germany	Alsterdorfer Sporthalle	Another Level
June 16, 1998	Paris	France	Palais Omnisports de Paris-Bercy	Another Level
June 17, 1998	London	England	Wembley Arena	Another Level
North America
July 9, 1998	Washington, D.C.	United States	MCI Center	NSYNC; Usher
July 11, 1998	Cleveland	United States	Gund Arena	NSYNC; Usher
July 12, 1998	Cincinnati	United States	The Crown	NSYNC; Usher
July 14, 1998	Grand Rapids	United States	Van Andel Arena	NSYNC; Usher
July 15, 1998	Moline	United States	The MARK of the Quad Cities	NSYNC; Usher
July 17, 1998	Detroit	United States	Joe Louis Arena	NSYNC; Usher
July 18, 1998	Detroit	United States	Joe Louis Arena	NSYNC; Usher
July 22, 1998	Camden	United States	E-Centre	NSYNC; Usher
July 24, 1998	Rosemont	United States	Rosemont Horizon	NSYNC; Usher
July 25, 1998	Rosemont	United States	Rosemont Horizon	NSYNC; Usher
July 28, 1998	Milwaukee	United States	Bradley Center	NSYNC; Usher
July 29, 1998	Minneapolis	United States	Target Center	NSYNC; Usher
July 31, 1998	Maryland Heights	United States	Riverport Amphitheatre	NSYNC; Usher
August 1, 1998	Kansas City	United States	Kemper Arena	NSYNC; Usher
August 3, 1998	Denver	United States	McNichols Sports Arena	NSYNC; Usher
August 5, 1998	West Valley City	United States	E Center	NSYNC; Usher
August 8, 1998	Vancouver	Canada	General Motors Place	NSYNC; Usher
August 11, 1998	Portland	United States	Rose Garden	NSYNC; Usher
August 13, 1998	Oakland	United States	The Arena in Oakland	NSYNC; Usher
August 14, 1998	Sacramento	United States	ARCO Arena	NSYNC; Usher
August 16, 1998	Mountain View	United States	Shoreline Amphitheatre	NSYNC; Usher
August 20, 1998	Inglewood	United States	Great Western Forum	NSYNC; Usher
August 23, 1998	Anaheim	United States	Arrowhead Pond of Anaheim	NSYNC; Usher
August 24, 1998	Fresno	United States	Selland Arena	NSYNC; Usher
August 26, 1998	Phoenix	United States	America West Arena	NSYNC; Usher
August 28, 1998	San Diego	United States	San Diego Sports Arena	NSYNC; Usher
August 29, 1998	Las Vegas	United States	MGM Grand Garden Arena	NSYNC; Usher
September 3, 1998	Greenville	United States	BI-LO Center	NSYNC; Usher
September 4, 1998	Charlotte	United States	Blockbuster Pavilion	NSYNC; Usher
September 5, 1998	Nashville	United States	Nashville Arena	NSYNC; Usher
September 7, 1998	Dallas	United States	Starplex Amphitheatre	NSYNC; Usher
September 9, 1998	San Antonio	United States	Alamodome	NSYNC; Usher
September 11, 1998	West Palm Beach	United States	Coral Sky Amphitheatre	NSYNC; Usher
September 12, 1998	Tampa	United States	Ice Palace	NSYNC; Usher
September 15, 1998	Orlando	United States	Orlando Arena	NSYNC; Usher
September 16, 1998	Atlanta	United States	Coca-Cola Lakewood Amphitheatre	NSYNC; Usher
September 18, 1998	Boston	United States	FleetCenter	NSYNC; Usher
September 19, 1998	Atlantic City	United States	Mark G. Etess Arena	NSYNC; Usher
September 21, 1998	Bristow	United States	Nissan Pavilion at Stone Ridge	NSYNC; Usher
September 22, 1998	Burgettstown	United States	Coca-Cola Star Lake Amphitheater	NSYNC; Usher
September 24, 1998	Columbus	United States	Polaris Amphitheater	NSYNC; Usher
September 26, 1998	Rochester	United States	Blue Cross Arena	NSYNC; Usher
September 27, 1998	Ottawa	Canada	Corel Centre	NSYNC; Usher
September 29, 1998	Toronto	Canada	SkyDome	NSYNC; Usher
September 30, 1998	Montreal	Canada	Molson Centre	NSYNC; Usher
October 2, 1998	Worcester	United States	Worcester's Centrum Centre	NSYNC; Usher
October 4, 1998	Hartford	United States	Hartford Civic Center	NSYNC; Usher
October 5, 1998	University Park	United States	Bryce Jordan Center	NSYNC; Usher
October 6, 1998	East Rutherford	United States	Continental Airlines Arena	NSYNC; Usher
October 10, 1998	New York City	United States	Madison Square Garden	NSYNC; Usher
October 11, 1998	New York City	United States	Madison Square Garden	NSYNC; Usher
October 14, 1998	Baltimore	United States	Baltimore Arena	NSYNC; Usher
October 16, 1998	Rosemont	United States	Rosemont Horizon	NSYNC; Usher
October 18, 1998	Auburn Hills	United States	The Palace of Auburn Hills	NSYNC; Usher
October 20, 1998	Raleigh	United States	Hardee's Walnut Creek Amphitheatre	NSYNC; Usher
October 21, 1998	Virginia Beach	United States	GTE Virginia Beach Amphitheater	NSYNC; Usher
October 25, 1998	Atlantic City	United States	Mark G. Etess Arena	NSYNC; Usher
October 27, 1998	Memphis	United States	Pyramid Arena	NSYNC; Usher
October 28, 1998	New Orleans	United States	Louisiana Superdome	NSYNC; Usher
October 30, 1998	The Woodlands	United States	Cynthia Woods Mitchell Pavilion	NSYNC; Usher
October 31, 1998	The Woodlands	United States	Cynthia Woods Mitchell Pavilion	NSYNC; Usher
Africa
November 14, 1998	Cape Town	South Africa	Green Point Stadium	Lynden David Hall; Boom Shaka; Dr. Victor & the Rasta Rebels
November 19, 1998	Durban	South Africa	Kings Park Stadium	Lynden David Hall; Boom Shaka; Dr. Victor & the Rasta Rebels
November 21, 1998	Johannesburg	South Africa	Ellis Park Stadium	Lynden David Hall; Boom Shaka; Dr. Victor & the Rasta Rebels
Oceania
November 27, 1998	Christchurch	New Zealand	WestpacTrust Centre	Che Fu
November 28, 1998	Christchurch	New Zealand	WestpacTrust Centre	Che Fu
November 30, 1998	Wellington	New Zealand	Queens Wharf Events Centre	Che Fu
December 1, 1998	Wellington	New Zealand	Queens Wharf Events Centre	Che Fu
December 3, 1998	Wellington	New Zealand	Queens Wharf Events Centre	Che Fu
December 5, 1998	Auckland	New Zealand	Ericsson Stadium	Boyz II Men; Che Fu
December 7, 1998	Brisbane	Australia	Brisbane Entertainment Centre	Human Nature
December 9, 1998	Sydney	Australia	Sydney Entertainment Centre	Human Nature
December 10, 1998	Newcastle	Australia	Newcastle Entertainment Centre	Human Nature
December 12, 1998	Sydney	Australia	Sydney Entertainment Centre	Human Nature
December 13, 1998	Perth	Australia	Perth Entertainment Centre	Human Nature
December 14, 1998	Perth	Australia	Perth Entertainment Centre	Human Nature
December 15, 1998	Melbourne	Australia	Melbourne Park	Human Nature
December 17, 1998	Melbourne	Australia	Melbourne Park	Human Nature
December 20, 1998	Adelaide	Australia	Adelaide Entertainment Centre	Human Nature
Asia
January 12, 1999	Tokyo	Japan	Nippon Budokan	—N/a
January 13, 1999	Tokyo	Japan	Nippon Budokan	—N/a
January 14, 1999	Tokyo	Japan	Nippon Budokan	—N/a
January 16, 1999	Osaka	Japan	Osaka-jō Hall	—N/a
January 17, 1999	Osaka	Japan	Osaka-jō Hall	—N/a
January 19, 1999	Osaka	Japan	Osaka-jō Hall	—N/a
January 20, 1999	Osaka	Japan	Osaka-jō Hall	—N/a
January 21, 1999	Nagoya	Japan	Nagoya Rainbow Hall	—N/a
January 23, 1999	Hamamatsu	Japan	Hamamatsu Arena	—N/a
January 25, 1999	Tokyo	Japan	Nippon Budokan	—N/a
January 26, 1999	Tokyo	Japan	Nippon Budokan	—N/a
Oceania
January 30, 1999	Honolulu	United States	Aloha Stadium	98 Degrees

== Box office score data ==
List of concerts, showing date, venue, city, tickets sold, number of available tickets and amount of gross revenue
Date	Venue	City	Attendance / Capacity	Revenue
July 9, 1998	MCI Center	Washington, D.C.	15,069 / 15,069 (100%)	$883,142
July 24, 1998	Rosemont Horizon	Rosemont	26,204 / 26,204 (100%)	$1,542,845
July 25, 1998	Rosemont Horizon	Rosemont	26,204 / 26,204 (100%)	$1,542,845
August 16, 1998	Shoreline Amphitheatre	Mountain View	18,853 / 21,420 (88%)	$759,525
August 28, 1998	San Diego Sports Arena	San Diego	11,000 / 11,000 (100%)	$552,910
August 29, 1998	MGM Grand Garden Arena	Las Vegas	12,875 / 12,875 (100%)	$941,497
September 3, 1998	BI-LO Center	Greenville	10,840 / 10,840 (100%)	$531,344
September 5, 1998	Nashville Arena	Nashville	12,598 / 14,667 (86%)	$507,214
September 11, 1998	Coral Sky Amphitheater	West Palm Beach	12,764 / 17,000 (75%)	$491,891
September 12, 1998	Ice Palace	Tampa	12,196 / 14,539 (84%)	$595,560
September 29, 1998	SkyDome	Toronto	16,314 / 16,314 (100%)	$720,928
October 3, 1998	Hartford Civic Center	Hartford	10,733 / 12,500 (85%)	$504,109
October 10, 1998	Madison Square Garden	New York City	28,930 / 28,930 (100%)	$2,542,024
October 11, 1998	Madison Square Garden	New York City	28,930 / 28,930 (100%)	$2,542,024
October 27, 1998	The Pyramid	Memphis	8,757 / 9,779 (89%)	$364,160
October 30, 1998	Cynthia Woods Mitchell Pavilion	The Woodlands	23,528 / 25,981 (90%)	$876,464
October 31, 1998	Cynthia Woods Mitchell Pavilion	The Woodlands	23,528 / 25,981 (90%)	$876,464
January 30, 1999	Aloha Stadium	Honolulu	38,224 / 38,224 (100%)	$2,164,000
Total			258,885 / 275,342 (94%)	$11,813,613

== Personnel ==
=== Band ===
- Musical Director & Keys: Rex Salas
- Drums: Lil John Roberts
- 2nd Keys: Darrel Smith
- Percussion: Terry Santiel
- Guitar: David Barry
- Bass: Sam Sims
- Main vocals: Janet Jackson
- Background vocals: Stacy Campbell and Rebecca Valadez

=== Dancers ===
- Tina Landon (choreographer)
- Kelly Konno
- Gil Duldulao
- Michael Andrews
- Tyce Diorio
- Teresa Espinosa
- Shawnette Heard
- Nikki Pantenburg
- Robert Vinson
