= No Strings Attached (Jassi Sidhu album) =

Studio album by Jassi Sidhu
- Released: 21 January 2006
- Genre: Bhangra
- Length: 42:00
- Label: MovieBox, Speed Records, Planet Recordz

Jassi Sidhu chronology
| Aashiqui (2005) | No Strings Attached (2006) | The First Stroke (2008) |

Professional ratings
Review scores
| Source | Rating |
|---|---|
| DesiTunes4U | 7/10 stars |
| Desiest | 7/10 stars |

No Strings Attached is the second album of the Punjabi singer Jassi Sidhu, released in 2005, after the success of Reality Check and Aashiqui. The album comprised ten brand new tracks, including seven originals and three remixes.

Jassi Sidhu tried this time to make a new sound and as a repercussion of that, there was a rock ballet track in the album called “Honkeh”. The rest of the album somewhat resembled his debut album. Although it was a big commercial hit in India, it was not well received in the international market. Moreover, the reviews of the album were below those of Reality Check.

== Track listing ==
No Strings Attached
| No. | Title | Length |
|---|---|---|
| 1. | "Puth Jatt Thaa" | 4:45 |
| 2. | "Honkeh (Weird World Mix)" | 4:44 |
| 3. | "Raahe Raahe" | 4:23 |
| 4. | "Margay Margay" | 4:13 |
| 5. | "Rahe Rahe (Rishi"Gooks" Rich Mix)" | 4:16 |
| 6. | "Pabi" | 4:34 |
| 7. | "Honkeh (I'm Still Angry Mix)" | 3:41 |
| 8. | "Fohl" | 4:58 |
| 9. | "Puth Jatt Thaa (Street Mix)" | 2:59 |
| 10. | "Tappe" | 4:24 |
