= List of Cash Box Top 100 number-one singles of 1994 =

These are the singles that reached number one on the Top 100 Singles chart in 1994 as published by Cash Box magazine.

Key
†	Indicates best-performing single of 1994

Issue date	Song	Artist
January 1	"Again"	Janet Jackson
January 8	"Again"	Janet Jackson
January 15	"Again"	Janet Jackson
January 22	"All For Love"	Bryan Adams, Rod Stewart and Sting
January 29	"All For Love"	Bryan Adams, Rod Stewart and Sting
February 5	"All For Love"	Bryan Adams, Rod Stewart and Sting
February 12	"All For Love"	Bryan Adams, Rod Stewart and Sting
February 19	"All For Love"	Bryan Adams, Rod Stewart and Sting
February 26	"The Power of Love"	Celine Dion
March 5	"The Power of Love"	Celine Dion
March 12	"The Power of Love"	Celine Dion
March 19	"The Sign"	Ace of Base
March 26	"The Sign"	Ace of Base
April 2	"Without You"	Mariah Carey
April 9	"Without You"	Mariah Carey
April 16	"The Sign"	Ace of Base
April 23	"The Most Beautiful Girl in the World"	Prince
April 30	"The Most Beautiful Girl in the World"	Prince
May 7	"The Most Beautiful Girl in the World"	Prince
May 14	"The Most Beautiful Girl in the World"	Prince
May 21	"The Most Beautiful Girl in the World"	Prince
May 28	"I Swear"	All-4-One
June 4	"I Swear"	All-4-One
June 11	"I Swear"	All-4-One
June 18	"I Swear"	All-4-One
June 25	"I Swear"	All-4-One
July 2	"I Swear"	All-4-One
July 9	"Don't Turn Around" †	Ace of Base
July 16	"Any Time, Any Place/And On and On"	Janet Jackson
July 23	"Don't Turn Around" †	Ace of Base
July 30	"Don't Turn Around" †	Ace of Base
August 6	"Any Time, Any Place/And On and On"	Janet Jackson
August 13	"Any Time, Any Place/And On and On"	Janet Jackson
August 20	"Stay (I Missed You)"	Lisa Loeb and Nine Stories
August 27	"Stay (I Missed You)"	Lisa Loeb and Nine Stories
September 3	"I'll Make Love To You"	Boyz II Men
September 10	"I'll Make Love To You"	Boyz II Men
September 17	"I'll Make Love To You"	Boyz II Men
September 24	"I'll Make Love To You"	Boyz II Men
October 1	"I'll Make Love To You"	Boyz II Men
October 8	"I'll Make Love To You"	Boyz II Men
October 15	"I'll Make Love To You"	Boyz II Men
October 22	"I'll Make Love To You"	Boyz II Men
October 29	"I'll Make Love To You"	Boyz II Men
November 5	"I'll Make Love To You"	Boyz II Men
November 12	"I'll Make Love To You"	Boyz II Men
November 19	"I'll Make Love To You"	Boyz II Men
November 26	"I'll Make Love To You"	Boyz II Men
December 3	"On Bended Knee"	Boyz II Men
December 10	"On Bended Knee"	Boyz II Men
December 17	"On Bended Knee"	Boyz II Men
December 24	"On Bended Knee"	Boyz II Men
December 31	"On Bended Knee"	Boyz II Men

== See also ==
- 1994 in music
- List of Hot 100 number-one singles of 1994 (U.S.)
