= Jassi Sidhu =

- Also known as: Jassi Sidhu
- Born: Jaspalll Singh sidhu Birmingham, England
- Origin: Punjab, India
- Occupation: Singer
- Years active: 2003–present
- Labels: MovieBox (United Kingdom/Europe); Vanjhali Recordz (India)
- Website: jassisidhu.com

Jassi Sidhu (born in Birmingham, United Kingdom) is a British-Indian Bhangra singer and the former lead singer of bhangra band B21.

He has released five solo albums to date. Reality check in 2003, No Strings Attached in 2005, The New Adventures of Jassi Sidhu in 2008, Singing Between The Lines in 2011 & Coleshill Road in 2014.

Sidhu was born and raised in Birmingham, West Midlands, England. He has toured many countries since going solo, from the US to the Far East. He is an avid Manchester United F.C. fan.

Since departing from B21, Jassi Sidhu has released four solo albums and one greatest hits album. His debut album titled Reality Check was released in 2003, and contained ten brand new songs. This release landed him a place in India, it was the first step for him to creating the foundations of his mediocre solo career. The album contained seven songs and three remixes. His second album called No Strings Attached was released in 2005, and also contained 10 new songs. This time Sidhu created a rock ballet type of song called honkeh. The album was not that successful and plumeted his reputation as a solo artist. The greatest hits album was filled with eight songs. Sidhu had redone three of the songs, "0Chandigarh", "Din Raat" and "Bhabi". The other five songs had the same music but saw Sidhu resigning them. Jassi Sidhus latest offering was called Ke Kehne and was released in 2008. This album has ten new songs and two remixes and saw Sidhu team up with "MBE" Malkit Singh. Jassi Sidhu also teams up with producer and friend Rishi Rich, as well as the man behind the hits "Tharti Hilde" and "Sher Punjabi", Aman Hayer.In April 2009, Jassi Sidhu released, Jassi What Happened?, an album comprising all his hits in live version recorded in the studio. It also came with a bonus DVD.Singing Between The Lines, featuring the single "Oh Jatta", was released for Digital Download on iTunes on 18 May 2011 and the CD released a week later. He appeared on the Breakdown Bhangra show in May 2011 on the BBC Asian Network and publicly declared that this would be his last album although he did not rule out singing occasional songs on other artists album. The reason he gave was that he wanted to quit the Bhangra industry after almost 20 years and try something new that he was good at. In 2013, he released his song "Hipshaker" featuring Lilly Singh. In 2014, he released his song, "Singh" with Vanjhali Records. In 2020, he announced he will release a new album, titled The Trilogy. The album will feature 3 songs and will now be released in 2021. He released the song "Kudi Chandigarh Di" in March 2021, his first song since 2014.

== Discography ==
=== Film Songs ===
- Chandigarh Kare Aashiqui (2021) - Title Track (composed by Sachin-Jigar), Title Track 2.0 (composed by Tanishk Bagchi)
- Khel Khel Mein (2024) - TBA

=== Singles ===
Release	Album	Record label
2021	Kudi Chandigarh Di; The Trilogy	T Series
2014	Singh – Single	Vanjhali Records
2013	Hipshaker (featuring IISuperwomanII) – Single	MovieBox/Vanjhali Records
2011	Singing Between the Lines; Nai Ressan	MovieBox; Vanjhali Recordz
2009	Jassi What Happened? Sohni Lagdi	MovieBox; M Series
2008	The New Adventures of Jassi Sidhu; Ki Kehne	MovieBox/Music Waves; M Series
2006	No Strings Attached	MovieBox/Speed Records/Planet Recordz
2005; 2008	Aashiqui; The First Stroke	MovieBox; Speed Records
2003	Reality Check; Ishq Wich Jogi	MovieBox/Music Waves; Nupur Audio

|- 2026 strong JYP Entertainment

== See also ==
- List of British Sikhs
