= Reality Check (Jassi Sidhu album) =

Studio album by Jassi Sidhu
- Released: 1 July 2003
- Genre: Bhangra
- Length: 46 Minutes
- Label: MovieBox, Music Waves

Jassi Sidhu chronology
Reality Check (2003)	Aashiqui (2005)

Reality Check is the debut album of Punjabi singer, Jassi Sidhu, released in 2003. It's his first album after he left his band, B21, in 2002. The album saw the departure of B21 sound and thus, paving the path for an exciting new sound by Jassi Sidhu. The album also opened the doors of success for Jassi in India, where, earlier, he was an unknown face. Reality Check was a commercial hit, both in U.K. and India.

== Difference between International and Indian edition ==
Reality Check was released as "Ishq Vich Jogi" in India on 28 June 2003 under the label, Nupur Audio. The Indian version had only 8 tracks, and the two tracks which were missing, were the versions of "Chargay Jawani". Moreover, there were title changes and track number changes in the Indian version.

Track lists of both the versions are given below. Name changes are accompanied by real track names in brackets in Indian version track list.

== Track listing ==
Reality Check (International Version)
No.	Title	Length
1.	"Agg"	5:53
2.	"Veer Tha Viyah"	4:54
3.	"Ama Ni Ama"	4:41
4.	"Pyar"	4:29
5.	"Agg Remix"	4:07
6.	"Chargay Jawani feat. Mc Metz & Mc Trix"	4:10
7.	"Nain"	4:46
8.	"Pyar Remix"	5:10
9.	"Chargay Jawani (Live)"	3:08
10.	"Ranja"	4:54

Ishq Vich Jogi (Indian Version)
No.	Title	Length
1.	"Ishq Vich Jogi (Ranja)"	4:54
2.	"Jaan Suli Tangdi (Agg)"	5:53
3.	"Awaan Ni Awaan (Ama Ni Ama)"	4:41
4.	"Sooli Tangadi (Agg Remix)"	4:07
5.	"Veerji (Veer Tha Viyah)"	4:54
6.	"Blues Eyes (Nain)"	4:46
7.	"Neend (Pyar)"	4:29
8.	"Kite Pyar (Pyar Remix)"	5:10
