= Singing Between the Lines =

Studio album by Jassi Sidhu
- Released: May 18, 2011
- Genre: Punjabi; Bhangra
- Label: Moviebox Birmingham Limited
- Producer: Aman Hayer; Rishi Rich; Jassi Sidhu

Jassi Sidhu chronology
Jassi What Happened (2009)	Singing Between the Lines (2011)	Hip Shaker (2013)

Singing Between the Lines is a 2011 album by British Bhangra singer Jassi Sidhu and produced by Sidhu and longtime collaborators Aman Hayer and Rishi Rich along with four others:Honey Singh, Pama Sarai, Billy Sandher & PBN (Panajabi By Nature).

== Track listing ==
Track	Song	Producer	Time
1	Nai Reesa	Aman Hayer	5:23
2	Naa Rukhiye	Rishi Rich	4:16
3	Chargay Jawani Sohniyeh	Jassi Sidhu	3:45
4	Jaan Mangdi	Honey Singh	3:23
5	Naal Nuchnah ft. Solé	Pama Sarai	4:16
6	Puthara Dhiya Dhaataa	Billy Sandher	4:46
7	Agg Vargi	Aman Hayer	3:49
8	Yaariyaan ft. Nindy Kaur	Pama Sarai	3:37
9	Umrit Varga Paani	Billy Sandher	4:26
10	Thor Punjabhan Dhi	Rishi Rich	3:53
11	Has Loh	PBN	4:13
12	Oh Jatta (Intro)	Jassi Sidhu	0:43
13	Oh Jatta	Jassi Sidhu	4:53

== Best Video ==
Best Video for connecting with Agg Vargi. And Thor Punjabhan Dhi
