= Throb (song) =

1994 single by Janet Jackson

Single by Janet Jackson

from the album Janet
- B-side: "Any Time, Any Place" (R. Kelly Mix); "And On and On"
- Released: June 18, 1994
- Recorded: 1992
- Studio: Flyte Tyme Studios (Edina, Minnesota)
- Genre: House
- Length: 4:35
- Label: Virgin
- Songwriters: Janet Jackson; James Harris III; Terry Lewis
- Producers: Janet Jackson; Jimmy Jam and Terry Lewis

Janet Jackson singles chronology
| "Any Time, Any Place" / "And On and On" (1994) | "Throb" (1994) | "You Want This" (1994) |

"Throb" is a song by American singer Janet Jackson from her fifth studio album, Janet (1993). It was written and produced by Jackson, James Harris III and Terry Lewis and is a house song with a nu jazz influence. It was released commercially in the Netherlands as the album's sixth single on June 18, 1994, while in the United States it was a radio-only release.

"Throb" was well received by critics who appreciated its production. In the Netherlands, the song peaked at 20 on the Tipparade—a chart of 30 positions below the Top 40. It peaked at number 2 on both the US Hot Dance Club Play and UK Dance Charts and reached number 66 on the US airplay chart. The song was performed on five of Jackson's tours.

== Composition ==
"Throb" begins with Jackson saying "come for me", before promising to "boom, boom, boom until noon, noon, noon". The song is accompanied by elements of house music, C&C Music Factory-esque beats and a saxophone loop. Chuck Arnold from Philadelphia Daily News noted the song's "surprisingly frank dirty talk" with the lyric "I can feel your body/Pressed against my body/When you start to poundin'/Love to feel you throbbin'". MuuMuse described the song writing that the track "swells and deflates in an aching, circular motion–not unlike a sensual rhythm".

An exclusive remix of "Throb", the Morales Badyard Mix, was included on Jackson's remix compilation album Janet Remixed in 1995. Peter Rauhofer remixed "Throb" in 2013 and released the remix on Valentine's Day.

== Critical reception ==
"Throb" received positive reviews from music critics. Billboard magazine, while reviewing the album on its twentieth anniversary, said, "If the production sounds a little dated now, the overtly sexual vibes on this track are pretty timeless – and still risqué for the early 90s.". MuuMuse gave a positive review for "Throb", defining it as "a '90's purist's house track, featuring classic dance rhythms and beat breaks". The reviewer continued saying the song is "a much grittier experience than the slinky seduction" of Madonna's 'Erotica' single released the year before, and finished saying "Surprisingly however, the track has aged brilliantly, and listening to it now is still an overly enjoyable experience".

Sputnikmusic considered that "Throb" has a "sexy workout feel". Philadelphia Daily News's Chuck Arnold called the song a "deep house jam with a pumpin' bass line". A reviewer for Soulbounce commented that for the "pulsing" song, Jackson became a house music diva. Complex noted that "Throb" is "the hip-house tantric jam". Sal Cinquemani from Slant Magazine commented: "Even the nearly structure-less 'Throb', [...] feels like a (perhaps unintentional) parody of Madonna's 'Erotica', right down to the hard, house beats. Alexis Petridis from The Guardian was more negative, stating that "Throb's awkward patchwork of moans [was] the first sign that the more explicit Jackson’s work got, the less sexy it would be".

== Chart performance ==
"Throb" was released as a commercial single in the Netherlands and charted at 20 on the Tipparade. In the United States, the song was not released commercially. However, it was sent to mainstream radio and charted on the Billboard Hot 100 Airplay, peaking at number 66. The song's B-side, "And On and On", went on to chart as well at number 28. "And On and On" also peaked at number twelve on the Hot R&B/Hip-Hop Airplay chart. However, according to Billboard's regulations, both songs were ineligible to chart on the Billboard Hot 100, due to their lack of a physical release in the US. However, "Throb" enjoyed success on the Hot Dance Club Songs chart, eventually reaching number two. Additionally, "Throb" topped Hot Dance Singles Sales as a B-side to "Any Time, Any Place".

== Live performances ==
Jackson performed "Throb" on Saturday Night Live along with "Any Time, Any Place". For the performance, she wore a cropped vest with frog closures on the front and decorative chains with metal studs, which was later auctioned for US$5,120 in 2021. Shahzaib Hussain from Clash magazine applauded the performance, saying that "backed by her band of loyal dancers, the switch-up from loose improv to patterned, synchronized routines reminded us no one could in music could move and groove like Janet".

"Throb" was later added to the Janet World Tour in 1993. During the performance, the screens swirled with techno-style patterns of fractal curves. According to Robert Hilburn from Los Angeles Times, it was performed with equal energy and style of the album's quality. The song was performed after a "frenzied" medley of "What Have You Done for Me Lately", "The Pleasure Principle" and "Nasty" on The Velvet Rope Tour in 1998. After the performance, a red crushed-velvet curtain closed the stage, and a hidden light-and-sound came. The medley at the October 11, 1998 show in New York City, at the Madison Square Garden, was broadcast during a special titled The Velvet Rope: Live in Madison Square Garden by HBO. It was also added to the setlist at its DVD release, The Velvet Rope Tour – Live in Concert in 1999.

The song was also used as an interlude on the Number Ones: Up Close and Personal tour in 2011. It was also included on the 2015–16 Unbreakable World Tour and the 2017–19 State of the World Tour. Jackson also performed the song at the 2018 Billboard Music Awards, along with "Nasty" and "If". On this occasion, she was the first black woman to receive the Billboard Icon Award. It was also included on her 2019 Las Vegas residency Janet Jackson: Metamorphosis, and her set on Glastonbury Festival, as well on her brief Janet Jackson: A Special 30th Anniversary Celebration of Rhythm Nation tour the same year. Jackson included the song in a mashup with "Free Xone" on her 2023 Together Again Tour. The song was performed for her 2024–2025 Janet Jackson: Las Vegas residency.

== Track listings ==
- Dutch CD single
1. "Any Time, Any Place" (R. Kelly Mix) – 5:11
2. "Throb" – 4:34
- Dutch CD maxi single
1. "Throb" – 4:34
2. "Throb" (David Morales Legendary Dub Mix) – 7:27
3. "And On and On" – 4:49
4. "Any Time, Any Place" (R. Kelly Mix) – 5:11
- UK promotional 12-inch single

A1. "Throb" (David Morales Legendary Club Mix) – 9:05
B1. "Throb" (David Morales Legendary Dub Mix) – 7:27
B2. "Throb" – 4:34

== Credits and personnel ==
- Janet Jackson – lead vocals, background vocals, songwriter, producer
- Jimmy Jam and Terry Lewis – songwriters, producers, all instruments
- Tina Landon – additional vocals
- Josie Harris – additional vocals
- Mixed by Dave Rideau and Steve Hodge at Flyte Tyme Studios, Edina, Minnesota.

== Charts ==
Chart performance for "Throb"
| Chart (1993) | Peak position |
|---|---|
| Canada Dance Tracks (The Record) with "Any Time, Any Place" | 7 |
| Israel (Israeli Singles Chart) | 19 |
| Netherlands (Dutch Top 40 Tipparade) | 20 |
| Netherlands (Dutch Single Tip) | 10 |
| UK Dance (CIN) with "Any Time, Any Place" | 2 |
| UK Club (Music Week) David Morales remixes; with "Any Time, Any Place" CJ Mackintosh/R. Kelly/Jam & Lewis remixes | 1 |
| US Radio Songs (Billboard) | 66 |
| US Dance Club Songs (Billboard) | 2 |
| US Dance Singles Sales (Billboard) with "Any Time, Any Place" | 1 |
