= Music programmes on the BBC Asian Network =

The BBC Asian Network, a BBC National Radio station has a number of specifically music programmes (almost all programmes on the station except for Asian Network Reports on the BBC Asian Network have music on them but some shows specialise in music) in various styles of music aimed at the British South Asian Community in the UK.

== Current Music Programmes on the BBC Asian Network ==
- Murtz's Request Show every Saturday from 1300-1500 Your Bollywood, Bhangra, Hip Hop and RnB requests with Murtz.
- The Official Asian Download Chart with Suzi Mann - Suzi Mann counts down the Top 40 from the world's only sales-based Asian music chart.
- Mic Check - Asian MCs and the urban sounds of Asian Britain with Kan D Man & DJ Limelight. Every Saturday night from 2100–0000.
- Panjabi Hit Squad The biggest Hip Hop, 'Bollyhood' and Bhangra anthems with Dee and Rav every Saturday from 1800–2100.
- Retro Selection - Timeless classics from the 1960s, 70s, 80s and 90s. Every Saturday from 1300–1600.
- Saima Ajram - Pakistani music, entertainment and news. Every Sunday from 1600–1800.
- Dipps Bhamrah - Bhangra music, Punjabi entertainment and news. Every Sunday from 1800–2000.
- Nadia Ali - Bengali music, entertainment and news. Every Sunday from 2000–2200.
- Alpa Pandya - Gujarati music, entertainment and news. Every Sunday from 2200–0000.

== Former Music Programmes on the BBC Asian Network ==
- Sound Selection consisting of Music presented by Kanwal Qazi in the English language.
- The Mix Bhangra & Fusion presented by DJ Sanj followed by DJ Stin and then later presented by Dipps Bhamrah.
- T20 The top 20 bhangra album chart presented by Mike Allbut.
- BBC Asian Network Chart which is the BBC Asian Network Top 20 with Ravi Sagoo.
- Breakdown, Bhangra with Dipps Bhamrah. Previously presented by Ameet Chana- better known as an actor and Markie Mark who is now the Head of Music at the BBC Asian Network.
- Retro Selection that from 17 June 2006 was renamed having previously been called Old Gold presented by Kanwal Qazi and Zeb Qureshi, South Asian Golden Oldies, primarily a Hindi-Urdu programme.
- Sunday Soundtrack consisting of BBC Asian Network filmi top 40 chart with Murtz.
- Friction presented by Bobby Friction with new British Asian Music - new weekday Programme every evening except Wednesdays.
- Hype presented by DJ Kayper with hip hop, Desi Beats, Grime - every Wednesday evening.
- The Jump Off presented by Mentor Kolektiv, "Urban Bhangra to Bollywood bangers".
- Electro East, Music consisting of Leftfield, Drum and Bass and Asian Electronica hosted by Nerm.
- Mic Check consisting of Asian MCs, Rap, Hip-Hop and "everything Urban".
- Pathaan's Musical Rickshaw "Chill out in the early hours".
- DJ Kayper - specialist music show. The biggest Hip Hop, Bhangra and R'n'B joints.
