= And On and On =

1994 single by Janet Jackson

Single by Janet Jackson

from the album Janet Remixed
- A-side: "Any Time, Any Place (double A-side)"
- Released: May 23, 1994
- Genre: R&B
- Length: 4:51
- Label: Virgin
- Songwriters: Janet Jackson; Jimmy Jam and Terry Lewis; Sly Stone
- Producers: Jimmy Jam and Terry Lewis; Janet Jackson

Janet Jackson singles chronology
"Because of Love" (1994)	"Any Time, Any Place" / "And On and On" (1994)	"Throb" (1994)

"And On and On" is a song by American singer Janet Jackson from her second remix album Janet Remixed (1995). As the B-side to "Any Time, Any Place", "And On and On" peaked at number one on the US Billboard Hot R&B/Hip-Hop Songs chart and number two on the Billboard Hot 100. It also reached number one as a B-side on the Cash Box Top 100 in the summer of 1994.

== Release ==
"And On and On" was released in May 1994 as an unreleased track on the cassette and CD singles of "Any Time, Any Place".

== Reception ==
Larry Flick of Billboard magazine compared "And On and On" to Grace Jones's "Pull Up to the Bumper" and Sly and the Family Stone's "Family Affair". Flick also said he preferred the remix of "And On and On" instead of Jackson's "Throb".

== Chart performance ==
"And On and On" charted both as a B-side to "Any Time, Any Place" and as a separate single. On Billboard, "Any Time, Any Place" / "And On and On" peaked at number one on the Hot R&B/Hip-Hop Songs and number two on the Hot 100. As a separate single, "And On and On" reached number 12 on the Billboard R&B/Hip-Hop Airplay chart and number 17 on Billboard's Rhythmic chart. At the end of 1994, "And On and On" reached number 53 on the year-end Hot R&B Singles Airplay chart.

Similarly, "And On and On" peaked at number one on the Cash Box Top 100 as a B-side. With "Any Time, Any Place", the song peaked on the Top 100 R&B singles in June 1994 and the Top 100 Pop singles in July 1994.

== Awards and nominations ==
"And On and On" was nominated for R&B/Soul Song of the Year alongside "Any Time, Any Place" at the 1995 Soul Train Lady of Soul Awards.

== Charts ==
=== Weekly charts ===
Chart (1994)	Peak position
US Billboard Hot 100 with "Any Time, Any Place"	2
US Hot R&B/Hip-Hop Songs (Billboard) with "Any Time, Any Place"	1
US Rhythmic Airplay (Billboard)	17
US Cash Box Top 100	1

=== Year-end charts ===
Chart (1994)	Position
US Billboard Hot 100	30

== See also ==
- List of Cash Box Top 100 number-one singles of 1994
