= Runaway (Janet Jackson song) =

1995 single by Janet Jackson

Single by Janet Jackson

from the album Design of a Decade: 1986–1996
- Released: August 16, 1995
- Recorded: July–August 1995
- Studio: Flyte Tyme (Edina, Minnesota)
- Genre: Pop; dance
- Length: 3:35
- Label: A&M
- Songwriters: Janet Jackson; James Harris III, Terry Lewis
- Producers: Janet Jackson; Jimmy Jam and Terry Lewis

Janet Jackson singles chronology
"Scream" (1995)	"Runaway" (1995)	"Twenty Foreplay" (1996)

Music video
- "Runaway" on YouTube

"Runaway" is a song by American singer-songwriter Janet Jackson from her first greatest hits album, Design of a Decade: 1986–1996 (1995). Written and produced by Jackson and Jimmy Jam and Terry Lewis as one of the two original songs on the album, it was made available commercially as the lead single on August 29, 1995, by A&M Records in the United States. Originally written for a possible duet with her brother Michael Jackson, it is a pop and dance song with influences of Middle Eastern music, including church bells and sitars in the composition. It lyrically talks about traveling around the world. The song received positive reviews from music critics, who appreciated its production and compared it to works by Prince, as well as with Janet Jackson's past singles, most notably "Escapade".

"Runaway" was commercially successful upon release. In the US, it reached number three and became the fourth highest debut of all time on the Billboard Hot 100, and also made Jackson the first female artist in history to debut at the top 10 of the chart twice. The song also experienced success in other regions, peaking inside the top 10 in countries such as Australia, Canada, New Zealand, and the United Kingdom. An accompanying music video was directed by Marcus Nispel at an airplane hangar in California in August 1995. It shows Jackson traveling and visiting many locales around the world. The singer performed "Runaway" on The Velvet Rope Tour (1998–99), All for You Tour (2001–02), Rock Witchu Tour (2008), Number Ones, Up Close and Personal tour (2011), and most recently on second leg of her Together Again Tour in (2024).

== Background ==
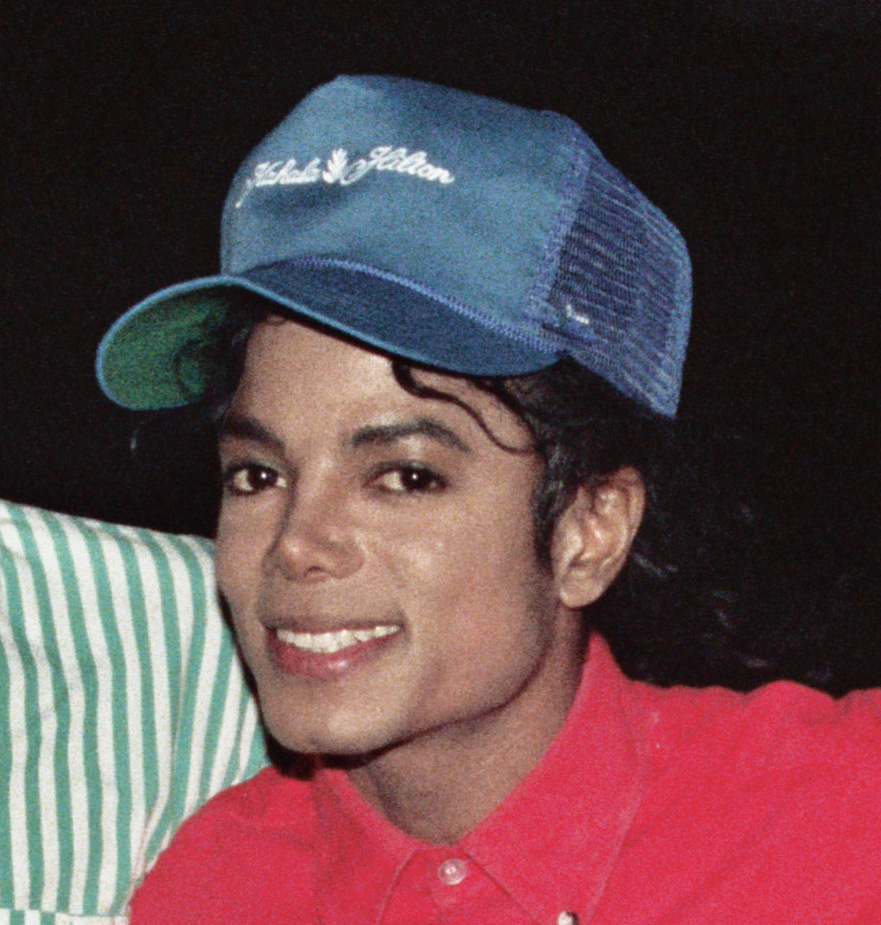
"Runaway" was originally created for a possible duet with Jackson's brother Michael (pictured in 1988)

In 1991, Jackson fulfilled her contract with A&M Records, signing a multimillion-dollar contract with Virgin Records estimated between $32 million and $50 million, making her the highest paid recording artist at the time. Her fifth studio album, titled Janet, was released in May 1993, selling 14 million copies worldwide. As Jackson's contract with Virgin included a clause giving her the option to leave the label during this time, she returned to A&M in order to release Design of a Decade: 1986–1996, her first compilation album, in October 1995. A&M president Al Cafaro stated: "We've always thought Janet was an A&M artist... And we would love to sign her if she is available. This project has reminded us how much fun she is to work with." According to Cafaro, no new songs would be released; however, "That's the Way Love Goes" from her contract with Virgin, as well as two new tracks, were included in the compilation, so it "legitimately represents Jackson's greatest hits from the past 10 years".

Two new songs — "Runaway" and "Twenty Foreplay" — were recorded in July and August 1995 for the album, produced by Jackson's longtime collaborators Jimmy Jam and Terry Lewis. "We just wanted a couple of great songs you could groove to, songs that would fit in with the rest of the package," Jam stated. While responding to Billboard's description of the songs as "decidedly upbeat" ones, Jam commented that "we tend to write in the mood that Janet's in at any given time, and she was in a very good, happy mood". "Runaway" was originally created to be a possible duet with Janet's brother Michael Jackson, but they chose to record "Scream" together instead. It was chosen as the lead single from Design of a Decade: 1986–1996, being serviced to radio stations in the United States on August 16, 1995, and was made available commercially as a cassette and CD single on August 29. Additionally, a variety of remixes of Janet Jackson's past single "When I Think of You" (1986), provided by David Morales, Deep Dish, and Farley and Heller, were included in the release. Afterwards, it was included on Jackson's second compilation album Number Ones (2009).

== Recording and composition ==
"Runaway" was written and produced by Jackson alongside Jam and Lewis. It was recorded at Flyte Tyme Studios in Edina, Minnesota, by Steve Hodge, who also mixed the track. Jam and Lewis also played all the instruments present on the song, with the exception of the guitar, which was played by Mike Scott. It was mastered by Bob Ludwig at Gateway Mastering in Portland, Maine, along with all other tracks present on Design of a Decade: 1986–1996.

"Runaway"
A 22-second sample of the song, demonstrating its influences of Middle Eastern music.

"Runaway" is set in common time with moderately slow groove tempo and a metronome of 92 beats per minute, and it is set in the key of C major. The track follows in the chord progression of B♭/C–C–B♭/C-C throughout. Musically, "Runaway" is a pop and dance song which draws influences of Middle Eastern music. According to Spin's Chris Norris, the song begins with sounds of church bells, synthetic gamelan, bubbling water, sitars and Jackson's "little girl giggle, which soon overtakes the mix". Billboard's Larry Flick wrote that it has a "gigglin' performance" by Jackson and "silken 'ooh-sha-sha' harmonies"; he also said Jam and Lewis "snap the song's playful elements into a cohesive package with a taut funk bassline and a Supremes-styled pop backbeat". For Music Week magazine, the track also "cleverly mixes the flavour of a vintage Prince track with Jackson's own inimitable style, fitting snugly alongside the Prince-influenced sound of the likes of TLC". For their part, Freaky Trigger website observed, "This is one of the few songs Janet has recorded that panders to her gossamer-thin voice; any more muscle on the verses or chorus would turn the shimmer into an insufferable bludgeoning mess." Reviewers also noted similarities between the song and Jackson's past single "Escapade" (1990).

Lyrically, in "Runaway" Jackson sings about traveling around the world. "I've seen the world / Been to many places / Made lots of friends / Many different faces", she sings while naming places like Nairobi, Tuscany, Australia, and Mexico, while also lamenting her lover's absence during her travels: "One thing was missing... that's you." At one point of the song, Jackson tries to convince him to join her: "It'll be fun, walking in the rain in Spain." Towards the end of the song, Jackson breaks the fourth wall with the line, "Ooh, didn't quite hit the note/That wasn't such a good time". Jam commented that the lyrics can be perceived on two levels, the first as running away from a loved one, and the second as an homage to her fans and the places she had visited with the 1993-95 Janet World Tour. From David Browne of Entertainment Weekly's point of view, the lyrical content saw Jackson going on tour and traveling to exotic destinations, but "that special someone" was not around to share it with her. Tina Maples from the Milwaukee Journal Sentinel stated that the song was comparable to "a postcard that reads 'Wish you were here. XOXOXO'", while also commenting it was "pretty much what you'd expect from a cloistered celeb who's been shuttled from airport to backstage to hotel room: Janet might have been around the world, but worldly she ain't".

== Critical reception ==
Professional ratings
Review scores
Source	Rating
The Charlotte Post	2/5 stars

"Runaway" was met with generally positive reviews from music critics. The Guardian's Ross Jones called the song "cute", while Phil Thompson of The Tampa Tribune considered it "bubbly", and Langston Wertz Jr. from The Charlotte Observer handed the classification of "excellent". According to Lindsay Harrison of Richmond Times-Dispatch, on "Runaway", Jackson "does what she does best — sing a danceable carefree song with a cheesy, but cool-in-a-way video". From Vibe magazine, Danyel Smith wrote that the song "sounds like an exotic, sitar-kissed reworking of 'Escapade,' and will probably be a smash by the time you read this". Howard Cohen of the Miami Herald had similar thoughts, calling it "an innocuous recasting of Jackson's superior Escapade", as well as "synthetic". According to The Knoxville News-Sentinel's Chuck Campbell, "Runaway" was a "fresh slice of upbeat pop". Gil L. Robertson IV from Cash Box named it Pick of the Week, noting that the song aptly shows Jackson's continued evolution as a "strong and highly-focused adult performer". Steve Baltin from the same publication felt it "marks a departure for Jackson, as she returns to a more innocent style", and noted that on certain moments of the song it is "impossible to tell Janet’s voice from that of her famous brother". Iestyn George from NME complimented its "sweet soul tread" that "carry an equally refreshing air of simplicity."

Tirzah Agassi of the Jerusalem Post wrote that with its "constant punctuation of temple bells", the song "sounds pretty good heard on its own" as the opening track of the album. Alan Jones from Music Week described it as "a good-natured, loose-limbed pop romp". For Browne, "Runaway" is "an innocuous trifle that avoids the strenuous overproduction" of much of Jackson's previous album, Janet. AllMusic senior editor Stephen Thomas Erlewine, while reviewing Design of a Decade: 1986/1996, felt that "Runaway" and "Twenty Foreplay" felt like "genuine hits, not tacked-on filler" on the album. On a contrary note, Billboard's Paul Verna felt that the inclusion of "Runaway" and "Twenty Foreplay" on the compilation "gives the collection extra sizzle, and suggests that Jackson's already lofty star is still on the rise". Paul Marsh from the San Francisco Examiner wrote that "Runaway" and "Twenty Foreplay" were not "that adventurous, but they're solid", complementing how "if they were white of more bohemian, Jackson-Jam-Lewis might have been a hot modern rock band". For Mark Brown from The Orange County Register, the difference in production values between Jackson's previous singles on the collection and "Runaway" showed how "much music has changed even within the narrow confines of Jackson's genre – or maybe it shows an increasing ability to get the best sound money can buy". Andrew Hirst of the Huddersfield Daily Examiner condemned the track as "surprisingly insignificant", and also criticized the inclusion of the remixes of "When I Think of You" on the single release.

== Commercial performance ==
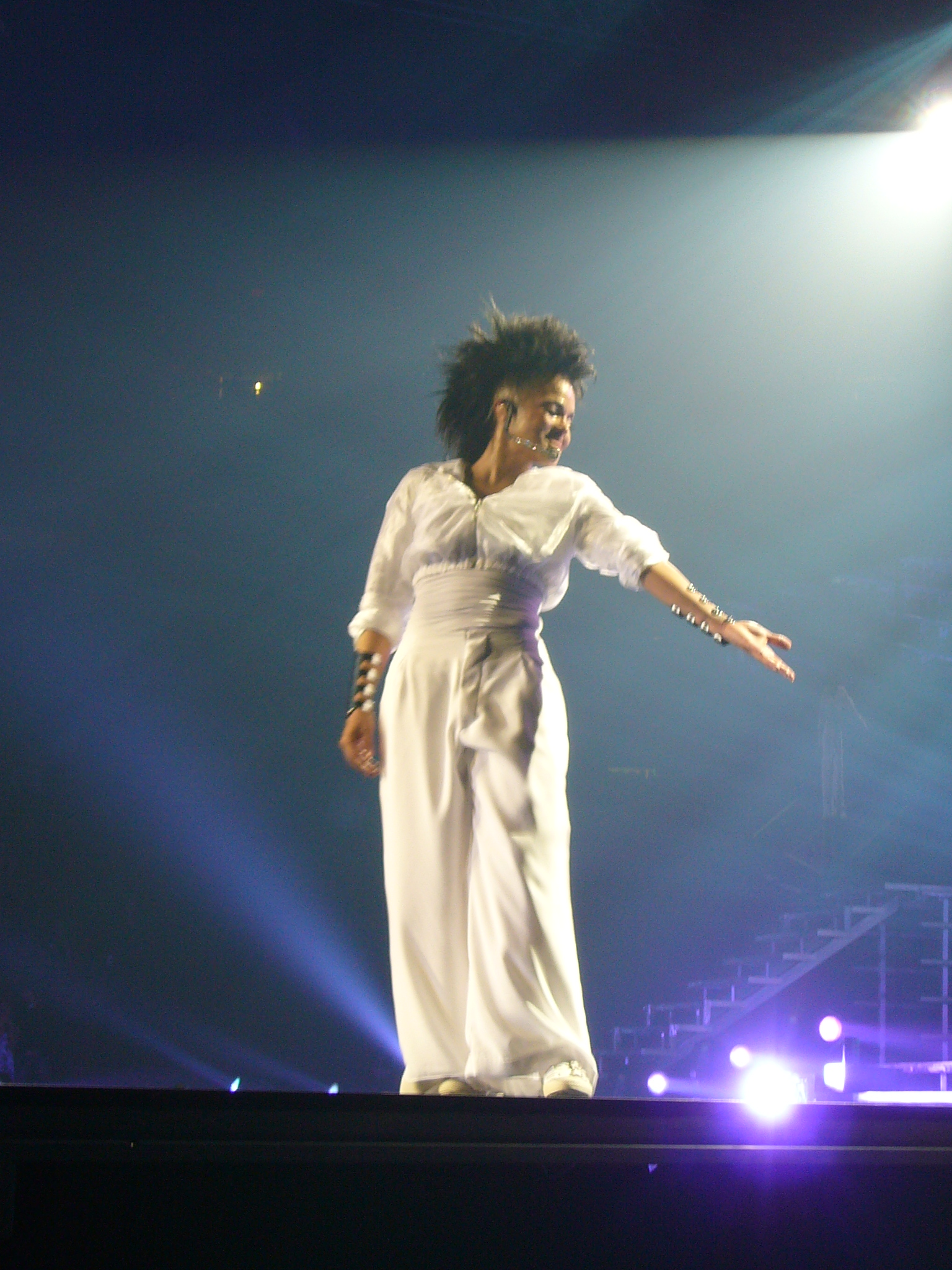
Jackson performing the track on 2008's Rock Witchu Tour; it became the fourth highest debut of all time on the Billboard Hot 100.

In the US, "Runaway" entered at number six on the Billboard Hot 100 chart on the issue dated September 16, 1995, selling 41,000 copies on its first week. The song became the fourth highest debut of all time on the chart, tied with the Beatles' song "Let It Be" (1970). It also made Jackson the first female artist in history to debut at the top 10 of the Hot 100 twice – her other single was "Scream", which entered at number five in June 1995. Five weeks later, "Runaway" reached number three, and spent 24 weeks inside the Hot 100. On November 20, 1995, the single was certified gold by the Recording Industry Association of America (RIAA) and sold 800,000 copies in the US. It ranked at number 29 on the year-end Billboard Hot 100 chart. In Canada, the track peaked at number two on the RPM Singles Chart on the week dated November 20, 1995, only behind Mariah Carey's "Fantasy".

In Australia, "Runaway" debuted on the ARIA Charts at number 20 on September 24, 1995. The next weeks it peaked at number eight, staying in the position for two weeks. The single was present for a total of 17 weeks on the chart, and was certified gold by the Australian Recording Industry Association (ARIA) for shipments of 35,000 copies in Australia. In New Zealand, the song had a similar run as in Australia; it debuted on its peak of number three on the chart, and stayed at the same position for the next week. It was certified gold by Recorded Music NZ (RMNZ) for sales of 5,000 copies, after being present on the charts for 16 weeks.

In the United Kingdom, "Runaway" entered at number six on the UK Singles Chart for the week ending on September 23, 1995, spending nine weeks inside the chart. In August 2017, it was revealed by the Official Charts Company that it was Jackson's 29th most downloaded track in the region. In Scotland, the song debuted and peaked at number eight. "Runaway" also achieved success in other parts of Europe. In Hungary, the song reached number five. In Finland, the track reached number eight, while in Denmark it peaked at number 10. Experiencing similar success, "Runaway" peaked at number 10 in Ireland. It also reached the top 40 in regions such as Belgium's Wallonia, France, Iceland, and the Netherlands. The single's commercial performance in the European countries helped it attain a peak of number 16 on the European Hot 100 Singles chart, on the issue dated September 30, 1995.

== Music video ==
Jackson (far right) performing choreographed moves on the wing of an airplane in the video for "Runaway".

The music video for "Runaway" was directed by Marcus Nispel. It was filmed at an airplane hangar in Van Nuys, California, in early August 1995. Produced by Vincent Nispel for Portfolio and Black Dog Films, the video premiered on August 29, 1995, through MTV. Nispel revealed that since Jackson wrote the song "as a thank you to all her fans around the entire world", he decided to "place her on an international journey" in the clip. The director worked with the Hollywood Digital production studio during August 1995 to integrate Jackson into two-dimensional photographs of the locales. The video was included on the Design of a Decade: 1986–1996 video release, along with a production documentary.

Carol Vernallis described the visual in Experiencing Music Video: Aesthetics and Cultural Context as Jackson "leapfrog[ing] among the Seven Wonders of the World"; her dress and jewelry are a combination of non-Western styles, as she wears "extensive makeup, appears with her hair up and 'exotically' straightened and her glasses diagonally pointed". It starts showing Jackson in her apartment in New York City (NYC). She walks in the living room, puts her dog on the floor, and then jumps out from the window, landing on a telephone pole. Jackson travels around the world and visits several global landmarks, including the pyramids of Egypt, the Christ the Redeemer sculpture in Rio de Janeiro, and the Eiffel Tower in Paris. At one point, the singer and several dancers perform choreographed moves on the wing of an airplane. Upon returning from her trip, Jackson climbs back into her apartment to be greeted by her dog.

Agassi described the singer's portrayal in the video as a fairy-tale character, "leaping from global monument to global monument like a kung-fu heroine"; she deemed the visual as a "marvelous piece of entertainment, a fast-paced update of classic Hollywood musicals". Brett Atwood of Billboard observed that Jackson continued to "tinker with her on-screen image" in the clip; he also went on to say that some fans may be surprised by the nose ring she sports, which is "hard to miss since a strand of the sassy singer's hair is braided and tied to it". The Los Angeles Times' Lorraine Ali commented that while the video was a "total fantasy for an artist whose freedom is constricted by fame, many avid fans will no doubt digest it as some higher truth, making Jackson’s reality more twisted than ever". In Coming to You Wherever You Are: MuchMusic, MTV, and Youth Identities, Kip Pegley accused Jackson of cultural appropriation as she impersonates several non-Western cultures in the video. It additionally won the prize for Best Video at the 1996 International Dance Music Awards, held in Miami.

== Live performances ==
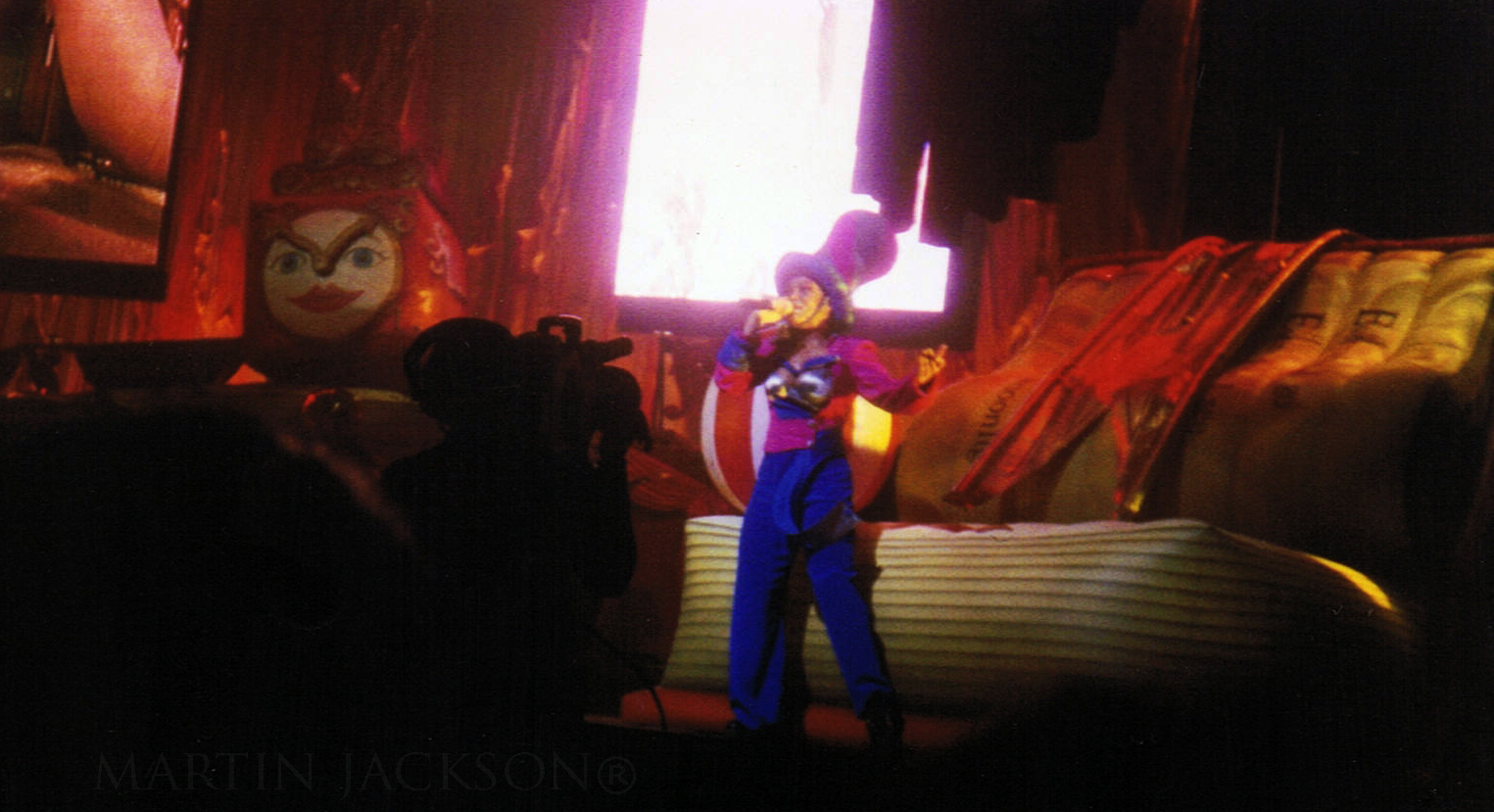
Jackson performing the song during a concert from The Velvet Rope Tour in Milan, Italy, on May 5, 1998.

"Runaway" was included on the setlist of Jackson's 1998-99 The Velvet Rope Tour, in a medley with her past singles "Escapade", "When I Think of You", "Miss You Much" (1989), and "Love Will Never Do (Without You)" (1990). During the performance, Jackson wore a jester's headdress and satin bustier, with her dancers dressed as "flowers, Mad Hatters, and horny gnomes" amid a "blindingly bright, poppy-induced set design" with varied props, which include a smiling clock tower, inflatable moons, mammoth chaise, vases, and books. The performance of the song at the October 11, 1998, show in NYC, at the Madison Square Garden, was broadcast during a special titled The Velvet Rope: Live in Madison Square Garden by HBO, and was included on the concert's video release, The Velvet Rope Tour: Live in Concert (1999).

It was also performed during the All for You Tour in 2001 and 2002, in a medley with "When I Think of You", "Miss You Much" and "Escapade", with the stage decorated with "colorful inflatable blow-up props", and the singer dressed as a pink flower; some music commentators viewed the performance as too similar to that of the previous tour. The February 16, 2002 final date of the tour at the Aloha Stadium in Honolulu, was broadcast by HBO, and included a performance of "Runaway". This rendition was also added to the setlist at its video release, Janet: Live in Hawaii, in 2002.

"Runaway" was used as the encore song for the Rock Witchu Tour in 2008, with Jackson and her dancers wearing white outfits. It was also performed at the concerts in Sydney, Australia, during the singer's 2011 Number Ones, Up Close and Personal tour. In 2018, the song was included on the second leg of the State of the World Tour. On February 13, 2020, "Runaway" was performed by Jackson and the Roots on The Tonight Show with Jimmy Fallon.

== Track listings ==
- US CD single
1. "Runaway" – 3:35
2. "Runaway" (Junior's Factory Mix) – 9:06
3. "When I Think of You" (Morales extended house mix '95) – 7:41
4. "When I Think of You" (Heller & Farley Project Mix) – 10:41
5. "Runaway" (Junior's unplugged mix) – 3:38
- UK CD single
1. "Runaway" – 3:35
2. "When I Think of You" (David Morales House Mix; 7-inch UK edit) – 3:30
3. "When I Think of You" (David Morales classic club mix) – 6:55
4. "When I Think of You" (David Morales Jazzy Mix; UK edit) – 10:18

== Credits and personnel ==
Credits are adapted from the Design of a Decade: 1986–1996 liner notes.

- Janet Jackson – vocals, songwriter, producer
- James Harris III – songwriter, producer, all instruments
- Terry Lewis – songwriter, producer, all instruments
- Mike Scott – guitar
- Steve Hodge – recording, mixing
- Bob Ludwig – mastering

== Charts ==
=== Weekly charts ===
Weekly chart performance for "Runaway"
Chart (1995)	Peak position
Australia (ARIA)	8
Belgium (Ultratop 50 Flanders)	41
Belgium (Ultratop 50 Wallonia)	27
Canada Retail Singles (The Record)	1
Canada Contemporary Hit Radio (The Record)	2
Canada Top Singles (RPM)	2
Canada Adult Contemporary (RPM)	1
Canada Dance/Urban (RPM)	3
Denmark (Tracklisten)	10
Europe (European Hot 100)	16
Europe (European Dance Radio)	1
Europe (European Hit Radio)	4
Finland (Suomen virallinen lista)	8
France (SNEP)	25
Germany (GfK)	39
Hungary (Mahasz)	5
Iceland (Íslenski Listinn Topp 40)	39
Ireland (IRMA)	10
Israel (Israeli Singles Chart)	8
Netherlands (Dutch Top 40)	32
Netherlands (Single Top 100)	28
New Zealand (Recorded Music NZ)	3
Scottish Singles Sales (Official Charts)	8
Sweden (Sverigetopplistan)	25
Switzerland (Schweizer Hitparade)	24
UK Singles (Official Charts)	6
UK Dance (Official Charts)	2
UK Hip Hop/R&B (Official Charts)	3
UK Airplay (Music Week)	5
US Billboard Hot 100	3
US Adult Contemporary (Billboard)	7
US Adult Pop Airplay (Billboard)	7
US Dance Club Songs (Billboard)	8
US Dance Singles Sales (Billboard)	2
US Hot R&B/Hip-Hop Songs (Billboard)	6
US Pop Airplay (Billboard)	2
US Rhythmic Airplay (Billboard)	3
US Cash Box Top 100	2

Weekly chart performance for "Runaway"/"When I Think of You" double pack
Chart (1995)	Peak position
UK Albums (Official Charts)	94
UK R&B Albums (Official Charts)	13

=== Year-end charts ===
1995 year-end chart performance for "Runaway"
Chart (1995)	Position
Australia (ARIA)	37
Brazil (Crowley)	36
Canada Top Singles (RPM)	32
Canada Adult Contemporary (RPM)	7
Canada Dance/Urban (RPM)	36
Europe (Europe Hot 100)	90
Europe (European Dance Radio)	1
Europe (European Hit Radio)	14
France (SNEP)	95
New Zealand (RIANZ)	26
UK Singles (OCC)	94
UK Airplay (Music Week)	50
US Billboard Hot 100	29
US Hot R&B Singles (Billboard)	64
US Maxi-Singles Sales (Billboard)	38
US Cash Box Top 100	16

1996 year-end chart performance for "Runaway"
Chart (1996)	Position
US Billboard Hot 100	84

=== Decade-end charts ===
Decade-end chart performance for "Runaway"
Chart (1990–1999)	Position
Canada (Nielsen SoundScan)	70

== Certifications ==
Certifications and sales for "Runaway"
Region	Certification	Certified units/sales
Australia (ARIA)	Gold	35,000^{^}
New Zealand (RMNZ)	Gold	5,000^{*}
United States (RIAA)	Gold	800,000
^{*} Sales figures based on certification alone.^{^} Shipments figures based on certification alone.

== Release history ==
Release dates and formats for "Runaway"
Region	Date	Format(s)	Label(s)	Ref.
United States	August 16, 1995	Radio	A&M	
United States	August 29, 1995	7-inch vinyl; CD; cassette	A&M	
Australia	September 11, 1995	CD; cassette	A&M; Polydor	
United Kingdom	September 11, 1995	12-inch vinyl; CD; cassette	A&M	
United States	September 19, 1995	12-inch vinyl; maxi-CD	A&M	
United Kingdom	October 2, 1995	12-inch vinyl double pack	A&M	
Japan	October 2, 1995	Mini-CD	A&M	
Australia	October 30, 1995	CD; cassette (remixes)	A&M; Polydor	
Japan	November 25, 1995	Maxi-CD	A&M	
