= Any Time, Any Place =

1994 single by Janet Jackson

Single by Janet Jackson

from the album Janet
- A-side: "And On and On (double A-side)"
- B-side: "Throb"
- Released: May 11, 1994
- Studio: Flyte Tyme (Edina, Minnesota)
- Genre: R&B
- Length: 7:08 (album version); 5:11 (R. Kelly remix)
- Label: Virgin
- Songwriters: Janet Jackson; James Harris III; Terry Lewis
- Producers: Jimmy Jam and Terry Lewis; Janet Jackson; R. Kelly (remix only)

Janet Jackson singles chronology
"Because of Love" (1994)	"Any Time, Any Place" / "And On and On" (1994)	"Throb" (1994)

Music video
- "Any Time, Any Place" on YouTube

"Any Time, Any Place" is a song by American singer-songwriter Janet Jackson from her fifth studio album, Janet (1993). It was written and produced by Jackson along with production duo Jimmy Jam and Terry Lewis, and released as the album's fifth single on May 11, 1994, by Virgin Records. A remix produced by R. Kelly was also released. "Any Time, Any Place" reached number two on the US Billboard Hot 100 and became another R&B chart-topper for Jackson. The accompanying music video was directed by Keir McFarlane and received a nomination at the 1994 Billboard Music Video Awards. Jackson has performed the song on several of her tours.

== Composition ==
"Any Time, Any Place" was co-written and co-produced by Jackson and Jimmy Jam and Terry Lewis. It is an R&B ballad. According to the sheet music published at Musicnotes.com, "Any Time, Any Place" is in common time with a slow tempo. It is set in the key of C minor with Jackson's voice spanning from B♭^{3} to D♭^{5}. Lyrically, the song is based on sexual liberation, similar to the music of Barry White and Marvin Gaye. Jackson sings about herself and her lover having public displays of affection. It also features saxophone and fingersnaps, with additional sounds of rain and thunder. The chorus of the song depicts Jackson singing "I don't care who's around" during her public lovemaking. According to Sputnikmusic, the song "oozes with the longing to be touched".

American singer R. Kelly made a remix of the song, which along with the CJ's 12-inch mix, appeared on Jackson's 1995 remix compilation album Janet Remixed.

== Critical reception ==
"Any Time, Any Place" received positive reviews from music critics. Jose F. Promis of AllMusic called the song "superb" and "subtle, sophisticated, syncopated, and jazzy". He also described the R. Kelly remix as a "meandering but ultimately sexy and engaging take", and "more straightforward pop and radio-friendly but doesn't relinquish its urban groove". Larry Flick from Billboard magazine stated that the "grinding R&B ballad" benefits greatly of R. Kelly's remix, adding, "He prunes the seven-plus minute album version down to an accessible length, shining a flattering light on Jackson's writhing vocal and the song's oh-so-sexy lyrical context."

Another Billboard editor, Andrew Hampp, while reviewing the album on its twentieth anniversary, called it "a stone-cold classic". Troy J. Augusto from Cash Box wrote, "Exactly one year after the release of the janet album comes the issue of one of its best tracks, this burning, down-tempo grinder. The single release prunes the original 7-minute song down to a tidy and most attractive 4 1/2-minute winner." Philadelphia Daily News's Chuck Arnold called the song a "delicate, aching ballad", which "warmly climaxes the carnality with a cooing vow of insatiability". James Hamilton from the Record Mirror Dance Update named it a "dreamy sweet warbler" in his weekly dance column. Sal Cinquemani from Slant Magazine noted that the song "provides a genuine climax: It's an oozing, slow-paced romp".

== Chart performance ==
The song held the number-one position on the US Billboard Hot R&B/Hip-Hop Songs chart for ten weeks and became Jackson's biggest hit on the chart. It peaked at number two on the Billboard Hot 100, while it saw limited success in Europe and Australia.

== Music video ==
The music video for "Any Time, Any Place" was directed by Keir McFarlane. At the end of the video, the screen fades to black, and a message fades in: "any time, any place ......be responsible". It was nominated for Best Clip of the Year in the category for R&B/Urban at the 1994 Billboard Music Video Awards. A remix video featuring the "R. Kelly Mix" was also released. Both versions of the video are featured on the 1994 VHS janet., while the original appears on the DVD edition of 2001's All for You, and on the 2004 DVD From Janet to Damita Jo: The Videos.

== Live performances ==
Jackson performed "Any Time, Any Place" on Saturday Night Live along with "Throb". During the performance of "Any Time, Any Place" on the Janet World Tour which occurred through 1993 and 1995, Jackson selected a man from the audience to the stage, and sat on his thigh. An instrumental interlude of the song was included on the Velvet Rope Tour in 1998 right before the performance of "Rope Burn", where Jackson picks an unsuspecting member of the audience onto stage and teases them with her performance which included a lap dance. The performance of the song at the October 11, 1998, show in New York City, at the Madison Square Garden, was broadcast during a special titled The Velvet Rope: Live in Madison Square Garden by HBO. It was also added to the setlist at its DVD release, the Velvet Rope Tour – Live in Concert in 1999. Due to censorship laws, "Rope Burn" and "Any Time, Any Place" were left out of the release in Hong Kong, where the video was issued as a 17 track double VCD.

It was later included on the 2008 Rock Witchu Tour, as an interlude for the performance of "Discipline", on which she and her dancers pull up a male audience member and strap him into a harness; he was then suspended midair as Jackson teased him with a highly suggestive set of moves and the breathy soft-core porn of the track. She repeated the performance during the 2010 Essence Music Festival. Additionally, an interlude of the song was included on the 2011 Number Ones, Up Close and Personal. It was also included on her 2015–16 Unbreakable World Tour, sampling Kendrick Lamar's "Poetic Justice". It was later added to her performances at the 2018 and 2022 Essence Music Festival, held in New Orleans, Louisiana, which she headlined. It was also included on the second leg of the State of the World Tour in 2018. It was also included on the setlist of her 2019 Las Vegas residency Janet Jackson: Metamorphosis, sampling Lamar's "Poetic Justice" and Ginuwine's "Pony"; during the performance, a male fan was brought onstage and was sat strapped to a chair. Jackson also included the song on her 2023 Together Again Tour.

== Legacy and samples ==
Hip-hop artist Da Deputy sampled "Any Time, Any Place" in 2012 with "Private Resort". Fellow rappers Kendrick Lamar and Drake would later heavily sample the song for their hit single "Poetic Justice" (from Kendrick's full-length debut studio album Good Kid, M.A.A.D City) on the same year, which was titled after the film Poetic Justice, which starred Jackson herself and Tupac Shakur. The song's producer Scoop DeVille recalled several artists wanting the song based on the Jackson sample, including rapper 50 Cent, before he ended up giving it to Lamar. Although Kendrick asked Jackson to appear in the music video, saying it would be "a blessing" and he was "a young boy that looked up to you for years", she did not make an appearance. Jackson would later sample "Poetic Justice" during her performances of "Any Time, Any Place" on the Unbreakable Tour. A freestyle over the song's instrumental was recorded and released by American rappers Busta Rhymes and Q-Tip on December 21, 2012, where the two pay homage to the singer. A gospel version of the song was featured in the pilot episode of Issa Rae's dramedy web series The Choir. Raheem DeVaughn recorded a cover version of the song with a few lyrics changed in 2015.

== Track listings and formats ==
- US 12-inch single (Y-38435)
1. R. Kelly mix – 5:12
2. Jam & Lewis remix – 4:30
3. "Throb" (David Morales Legendary dub) – 7:27
4. "Throb" – 4:48
- UK 12-inch single (VST 1501)
- Dutch CD maxi single (892 565 2)
1. CJ's 12-inch mix – 8:17
2. "Throb" (David Morales Legendary club mix) – 9:05
3. D&D house mix – 7:34
- UK CD maxi single (7243 8 38435 2 7)
- US CD maxi single (V25H-38435)
1. R. Kelly mix – 5:13
2. D&D House mix – 7:34
3. LP version – 7:10
4. "Throb" – 4:36
5. "And On and On" – 4:48

== Charts ==
=== Weekly charts ===
Chart (1994)	Peak position
Australia (ARIA)	37
Canada Retail Singles (The Record)	6
Canada Contemporary Hit Radio (The Record)	12
Canada Dance Tracks (The Record) with "Throb"	7
Canada Top Singles (RPM)	21
Europe (Eurochart Hot 100)	43
Europe (European Dance Radio)	4
Europe (European Hit Radio)	23
Iceland (Íslenski Listinn Topp 40)	37
Israel (Israeli Singles Chart)	15
New Zealand (Recorded Music NZ)	20
Scottish Singles Sales (Official Charts)	45
UK Singles (Official Charts)	13
UK Airplay (Music Week)	7
UK Club (Music Week) CJ Mackintosh/R. Kelly/Jam & Lewis remixes with "Throb" David Morales remixes	1
UK Dance (CIN) with "Throb"	2
US Billboard Hot 100 with "And On and On"	2
US Adult Contemporary (Billboard)	34
US Dance Singles Sales (Billboard) with "Throb"	1
US Hot R&B/Hip-Hop Songs (Billboard) with "And On and On"	1
US Pop Airplay (Billboard)	6
US Rhythmic Airplay (Billboard)	1
US Cash Box Top 100	1
US CHR/Top 40 (Radio & Records)	2
US Urban (Radio & Records)	1

=== Year-end charts ===
Chart (1994)	Position
UK Singles (OCC)	185
US Billboard Hot 100	30
US Hot R&B Singles (Billboard)	7
US Maxi-Singles Sales (Billboard)	20
US Cash Box Top 100	4
US CHR/Top 40 (Radio & Records)	13
US Urban (Radio & Records)	7

== Certifications ==
Region	Certification	Certified units/sales
United States (RIAA)	Platinum	1,000,000^{‡}
^{‡} Sales+streaming figures based on certification alone.

== Release history ==
Region	Date	Format(s)	Label(s)	Ref.
United States	May 11, 1994	12-inch vinyl; CD; cassette	Virgin	
United Kingdom	June 6, 1994	12-inch vinyl; CD; cassette	Virgin	
Australia	July 4, 1994	CD; cassette	Virgin	
Japan	July 27, 1994	Mini-CD	Virgin	

== See also ==
- R&B number-one hits of 1994 (USA)
