= B21 (band) =

English band

- Origin: Handsworth, Birmingham, United Kingdom
- Genres: Bhangra
- Years active: 1996–2004, 2014
- Label: MovieBox (United Kingdom)
- Members: Bally Jagpal; Bhota Jagpal
- Past members: Jassi Sidhu

B21 comprises brothers Bally and Bhota Jagpal. The duo — originally a trio with Jassi Sidhu, who left the band in 2002 — take their name from the Handsworth postcode in Birmingham, England.

== Discography ==
| Release | Album | Record label |
|---|---|---|
| 2014 | 12B | Moviebox |
| 2004 | Aashiqui | MovieBox |
| 2002 | Long Overdue; Jadon Jawani Wala | MovieBox; Tips |
| 2000 | Made in England | MovieBox |
| 1998 | By Public Demand | MovieBox |
| 1996 | The Sounds of B21 | MovieBox |

"Darshan", which was featured in Bend It Like Beckham and included on the film's soundtrack album and on the album Made in England.

=== Solo albums by Bally Jagpal ===
| Release | Album | Record label |
|---|---|---|
| 2002 | Dark and Direct | MovieBox |
| 2001 | Untruly Yours | MovieBox |
| 1999 | Dark and Dangerous | MovieBox |
| 1997 | Live and Direct | MovieBox |

|- |2026 |strong |JYP Entertainment

== Awards ==
- 2014 Brit Asia TV Music Awards (Birmingham)
  - Best Album for 12B
- 2003 UK Asian Music Awards (London)
  - Best Band B21 (Bhota Jagpal & Bally Jagpal)
- 2000 Asian Pop Awards (Birmingham)
  - Best Selling Album Dark & Dangerous (Bally Jagpal)
  - Best Song Aja Soneya (Bally Jagpal)
- 1999 Toor Films International Awards
  - Best Music Producer Bally Jagpal
- 1998 Movie Box Records (Birmingham)
  - Exceeding Sales Of 25,000 B21
- 1998 Movie Pageant Awards (London)
  - Best Newcomers B21
  - Best Selling Album Live and Direct (Bally Jagpal)
- 1998 Student Poll Awards (Leicester)
  - Best Newcomers B21
  - Best Album B21
- 1998 Pop Awards (Birmingham)
  - Best Newcomers B21
  - Best Up-coming B21
  - Best Song Bally Jagpal ("Nakhre Bin Soni Temi")
