= Kayper =

British DJ, music producer and broadcaster

Background information
- Born: Kaajal Bakrania; 6 August 1983 (age 42); London, England, United Kingdom
- Origin: United Kingdom
- Genres: Techno, House, Hip Hop, Dubstep, Breaks
- Occupations: DJ, Producer
- Instruments: Turntable, Sampler
- Years active: 1995–present
- Website: www.kayper.co.uk

Kayper (born 6 August 1983) is a British DJ, music producer, and broadcaster. She hosted several shows on the BBC Asian Network and BBC Radio 1Xtra between 2006 and 2012, and is known for her contributions to hip hop and electronic music. In a 2024 XLR8R interview, Kayper was described as "one of the most versatile DJs in the UK".

== Early life & Education ==
Kaajal Bakrania, professionally known as Kayper, was raised in Croydon, South London, and is the youngest of two children. Her parents are of Gujarati Indian heritage and immigrated to London from Nairobi, Kenya, in 1963. She attended St Mark’s Church of England Primary School in South Norwood. She completed her GCSEs at Westwood Girls' College, formerly Westwood High School for Girls, located in Upper Norwood. She then studied for her A levels at Coulsdon Sixth Form College, a further education institution in Coulsdon. She moved to Cambridge to attend Anglia Ruskin University, where she graduated in 2007 with a joint Bachelor of Science and Bachelor of Arts degree in Music Technology and Creative Music.

== Career ==
Kayper began DJing at the age of 11, growing up in a family of DJs and music producers. She initially played hip hop and R&B around her hometown of Croydon and began producing music at 15. In the early days of her career, she drew inspiration from her cousin Nookie, a pioneer of jungle and drum and bass in the early 1990s.

While studying Music Technology at Anglia Ruskin University in Cambridge, she participated in DJ battles and won several competitions in the early 2000s.

In 2003, she joined a four-deck DJ crew with DJ 279, DJ Pogo, and DJ Skully, performing weekly at Bar Rumba in London for a party called The Get Down.

In 2004, she launched her own club night, Ebonics, at The Fez Club in Cambridge, curating lineups with DJs including DJ Jazzy Jeff, DJ Premier, DJ Cash Money, and reggae sound system Stone Love.

In 2006, Kayper joined the BBC Asian Network, presenting The Hype Show, later renamed The DJ Kayper Show. The program spotlighted emerging British South Asian talent and showcased a wide range of genres including hip hop, dubstep, UK garage, drum and bass, house, and global music. Her eclectic style led to appearances at venues such as Fabric, Ministry of Sound, Printworks, Eden Ibiza, Amnesia Ibiza, Coachella, and Glastonbury.

Resident Advisor describes her Friday night BBC shows as "pivotal" in promoting British South Asian talent.

In the United States, Kayper built a parallel career from 2006, performing at venues including SOB's and House of Blues. In 2011, she signed with a Hollywood-based agency headed by actor and DJ, Chris Masterson. She later played at clubs such as LIV Miami and Hakkasan Las Vegas. From 2011 to 2022, she performed at Brent Bolthouse’s Neon Carnival at Coachella for 11 consecutive years.

In December 2012, The Guardian noted Kayper’s show debut on BBC Asian Network and her private DJ performance for Chris Martin and Gwyneth Paltrow in Nice. She has also performed at private events for clients including Rihanna and Jay-Z.

Around this time, she also toured with UK grime artist Mz Bratt as her supporting DJ. Kayper mixed Bratt’s 2010 Elements mixtape, which featured tracks like "Selecta" (produced by Redlight) and "Get Dark" (produced by Mikey J). They also performed together live, as seen in performances such as Get Dark featuring Mikey J. The pair appeared at major events including MistaJam’s Jam Packed at Fabric London, highlighting their synergy within the UK grime scene.

After leaving the BBC in 2012, Kayper focused on music production. She released a collaborative single with dubstep producer Engine Earz on Diplo’s Mad Decent label. She followed up with solo releases on her label Futurebox Records and released Out My Mind on Main Course, which received coverage from Pitchfork and was supported by BBC Radio 1’s Annie Mac.

In 2015, she released the EP Terminal featuring Janai on UK label Eton Messy Records. She followed it with the single What You Say featuring Jonny Winston, also released via Eton Messy. Her track Terminal was later included on the 2017 Eton Messy Compilation.

In 2024, she released three EPs on Hypercolour Records, reflecting a darker underground sound rooted in techno, breaks, and dubstep.

== Discography ==
=== Singles and EPs ===
- "Gimme Some" – Mad Decent (2011)
- "Magic Faces" – Futurebox Records (2013)
- "Out My Mind" – Main Course (2013)
- "Someone" – Spinnin' Deep (2014)
- Terminal EP – Eton Messy Records (2015)
- "What You Say" – Eton Messy Records (2015)
- Sweet Reminder EP – Futurebox Records (2017)
- Memories EP – Futurebox Records (2019)
- "Clap Your Hands" – Futurebox Records (2019)
- "Good Time" – Futurebox Records (2019)
- "Your Love" – Futurebox Records (2019)
- "Rain" – Futurebox Records (2022)
- "Burning Up" – Futurebox Records (2023)
- "Wut Wut" – Hai Music (2023)
- "Another Love" – Hai Music (2024)
- "Warning" – Hypercolour Records (2024)
- "Jungle" – Hypercolour Records (2024)
- "Champion Sound" – Hypercolour Records (2024)
- "Uprising" – Hypercolour Records (2024)
- "I Know That You're Able" – Hypercolour Records (2024)
- "Let the Music Lift" – Hypercolour Records (2024)

=== Remixes ===
- "Reach Out to Me" – Hard Times (2014)
- "Next Lifetime" (Erykah Badu remix) – Kayper (2015)
