= All Nite (Don't Stop) =

2004 single by Janet Jackson

Single by Janet Jackson

from the album Damita Jo
- B-side: "I Want You"; "Put Your Hands On"; "R&B Junkie"
- Released: May 17, 2004
- Studio: The Village (Los Angeles); Murlyn (Stockholm)
- Genre: Electro-funk; house
- Length: 3:26
- Label: Virgin
- Songwriters: Janet Jackson; James Harris III; Terry Lewis; Tony "Prof T" Tolbert; Anders Bagge; Arnthor Birgisson; Herbie Hancock; Paul Jackson; Melvin M. Ragin
- Producers: Bag & Arnthor; Janet Jackson

Janet Jackson singles chronology
"I Want You" (2004)	"All Nite (Don't Stop)" (2004)	"Don't Worry" (2005)

Music video
- "All Nite (Don't Stop)" on YouTube

"All Nite (Don't Stop)" is a song recorded by American singer Janet Jackson for her eighth studio album, Damita Jo (2004). It was written and produced by Jackson and Swedish duo Bag & Arnthor (consisting of Anders Bagge and Arnthor Birgisson), with additional writing from Jimmy Jam, Terry Lewis and Tony "Prof T" Tolbert. Virgin Records released the song to contemporary hit radio in the United States on May 17, 2004, as the album's third and final single. A So So Def remix featuring Elephant Man was also issued. "All Nite (Don't Stop)" is an electro-funk and house song that contains elements of samba, Latin, dance-pop, and dancehall. Jackson sings the song in a breathy falsetto, while lyrically it discusses being addicted to dancing in a club setting.

"All Nite (Don't Stop)" received positive reviews from music critics, with a number of them regarding it as the best song on Damita Jo. In the United States, the single's chart performance was massively affected by the blacklisting of Jackson's work on many radio formats and music channels, regarding conglomerates fined by the U.S. Federal Communications Commission (FCC) following her Super Bowl halftime show incident, thus not charting on the Billboard Hot 100. However, it managed to peak atop the Dance Club Songs and reach number eight on Hot Dance Airplay, while reaching the top 20 in Spain and the United Kingdom, as well as charting in several other countries. It additionally won a BMI London Award for Best Pop Song.

Its accompanying music video, directed by Francis Lawrence, portrays Jackson and her dancers rehearsing in an abandoned hotel during a power outage, but music channels faced criticism for removing a kiss between two female dancers. The music video received nominations for Best Dance Video at the International Dance Music Awards and Best Choreography at the MVPA Awards. In order to promote both the single and the album, Jackson performed "All Nite (Don't Stop)" during several appearances, including Saturday Night Live, On Air with Ryan Seacrest and Top of the Pops, in addition to the 2004 Video Music Awards Japan. The song was also performed on all of her subsequent tours following its release, the most recent being the Janet Jackson: Together Again tour (2023).

== Background ==
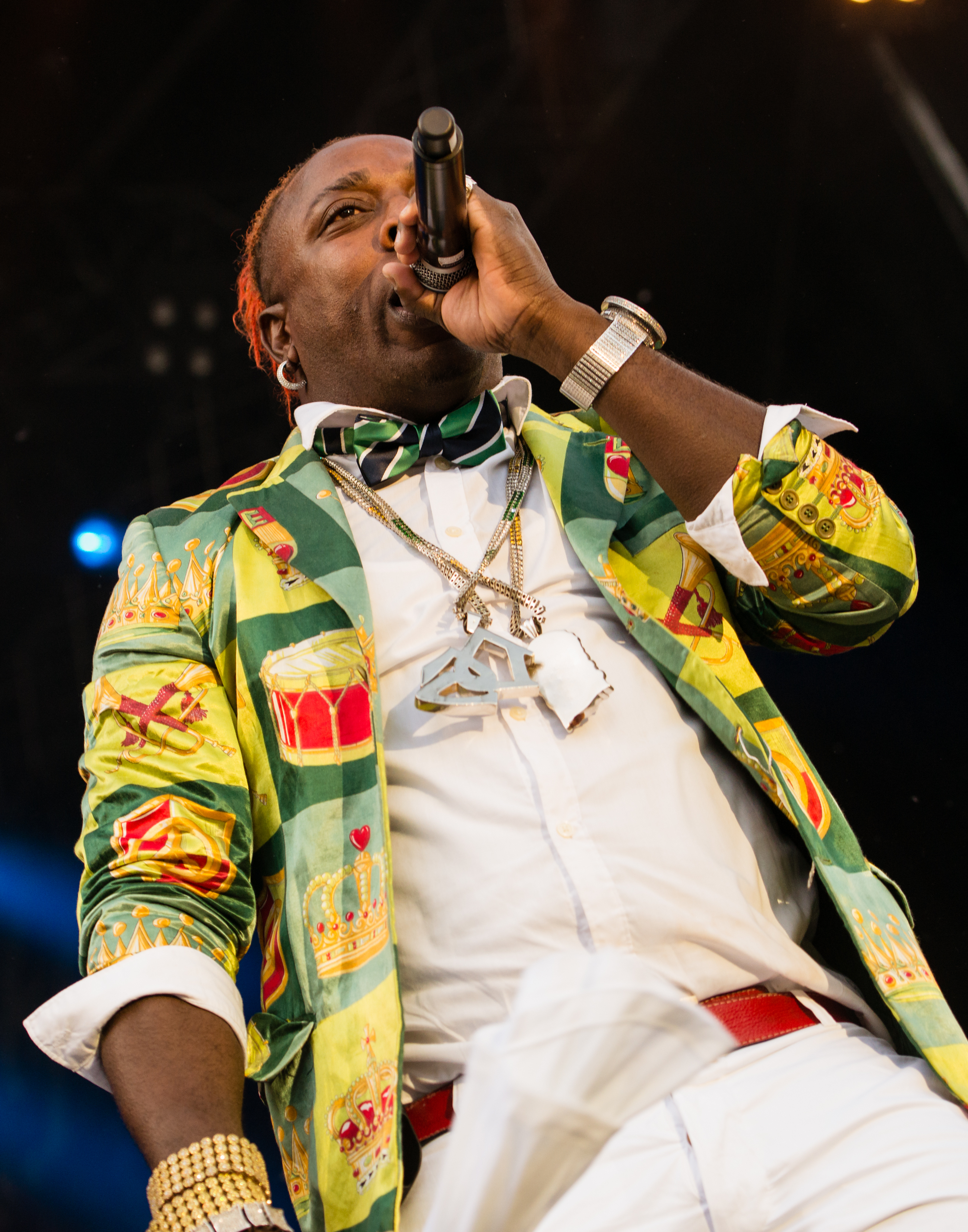
Elephant Man was featured on the So So Def remix of the track.

Recording sessions for Damita Jo began in August 2002, with Jackson initially collaborating with longtime partners Jimmy Jam and Terry Lewis, and concluded in February 2004 after 18 months, the longest Jackson had spent recording an album. She initially considered pursuing other career plans, but then decided to record another album. For only the second time in her career since Control (1986), Damita Jo saw the singer working with other music producers, including Swedish producers Anders Bagge and Arnthor Birgisson (collectively known as Bag & Arnthor) Murlyn Music; the duo specifically desired to work with Jackson prior to their collaboration, with Bagge stating, "That's my dream, she's the one I would give anything to work with. The ultimate female artist", while Birgisson commented, "let's just say we will definitely be prepared if and when that happens". Jackson recorded several songs with the duo, including "All Nite (Don't Stop)" and "SloLove", in addition to "I'm Here" and "Put Your Hands On", with the latter two being only included on the Japanese version of the album.

In the United States, "All Nite (Don't Stop)" was released to contemporary hit radios on May 17, 2004, by Virgin Records as the third single from Damita Jo, following "Just a Little While" and "I Want You". In addition, Jackson also considered "All Nite (Don't Stop)" as the album's lead before selecting "Just a Little While". A dancehall-influenced remix known as the So So Def remix features Jamaican musician Elephant Man and was produced by L'Roc and Jermaine Dupri, and included in some releases of the single. The remix was done just five days after he was contacted by Jackson's record label; Virgin had considered an urban remix of the track, based on the fact that there was already a version for pop radio stations, and they did not want to ignore the urban market. It was recorded at The Hit Factory in New York City, with Dupri handling the production. Willie Daniels, A&R at Elephant Man's label VP Records, noted that the remix would help both artists, and added that it would "no doubt open Elephant Man to the pop audience".

== Recording and composition ==
"All Nite (Don't Stop)" was recorded at The Village in Los Angeles, and at Murlyn Studios in Stockholm, Sweden. It was written and produced by Jackson along with Anders Bagge and Arnthor Birgisson of duo Bag & Arnthor, with additional writing by the singer's longtime collaborators Jimmy Jam and Terry Lewis, in addition to Tony "Prof T" Tolbert. Due to the sample's usage, Herbie Hancock, Paul Jackson and Melvin Ragin also received songwriting credits. Bag & Arnthor were also responsible for arranging, programming and recording the track. Instrumentation included bass, played by Magnum Coltrane Price, as well as Goran Kajfes and Per Ruskträsk playing horns. It was also programmed by Lee Gloves, being assisted by Rob Haggett; Anders Herrlin and Jennie Löfgren served as additional programmers. Henrik Brunberg was also an assistant engineer for the track. "All Nite (Don't Stop)" was mixed by Mark "Spike" Stent at Olympic Studios in London, assisted by David Treahearn, while mastered by Brian "Big Bass" Gardner at Bernie Grundman Mastering in Hollywood, along with all tracks present on Damita Jo.

"All Nite (Don't Stop)"
A 28-second sample of "All Nite (Don't Stop)", an electro-funk and house track, depicting Jackson announcing, "It's time to dance".

Musically, "All Nite (Don't Stop)" is an electro-funk and house song, which takes influences from samba, Latin, dance-pop and dancehall. Its melody is built around a sample of Herbie Hancock's "Hang Up Your Hang Ups" (1975). Jackson's "soft" vocals play "quite a minimal role" on the song, being delivered in a breathy falsetto over an "impossibly lithe bassline", described as "a bitch slap" to the senses by Spence D. from IGN. Yahoo! Music's Angus Batey described Jackson's vocal delivery as "almost ethereal", as well as "high-pitched". Contactmusic.com's Tareck Ghoneim noted that the track's beats were "on a house tip", which the single "more of a dance track than an r'n'b number", while based on its hook, Mark Lindores from Classic Pop considered "All Nite (Don't Stop)" as a "scorching companion" to Jackson's past single "Throb" (1994). Hits' Miles Marshall Lewis echoed this sentiment, calling it a "house jam in the mold" of "Throb".

Lyrically, "All Nite (Don't Stop)" discusses being addicted to dancing in a club setting. It opens with the phrase "this is sick" as Jackson later announces, "it's time to dance"; she encourages listeners to "join her in jerking, twerking, and dropping it lower than they had ever dreamed possible"; on the track, Jackson describes herself as being "so intoxicated, I'm so stimulated. Feel so X-rated. I could dance all night". Some of the lyrics were considered racy, being exemplified by the line: "Ooh, my body's yours (spank that) / Spank that back door (like that) / Drive me like a Porsche (ooh yeah) / I could dance all night". Veronica Heffernan of The New York Times said that the lyrics presented Jackson as "a demanding choreographer", as they switch between "1-900 confessionalism" and "drill-sergeant attitude", complemented by the singer's "sweetheart voice". For Nolan Feemey of Entertainment Weekly, it was clear that through her "with her orgasmic moans, don't-wake-the-neighbors whispers and instructions to 'get hardcore'", that Jackson was not "really talking about tearing up the dance floor".

== Critical reception ==
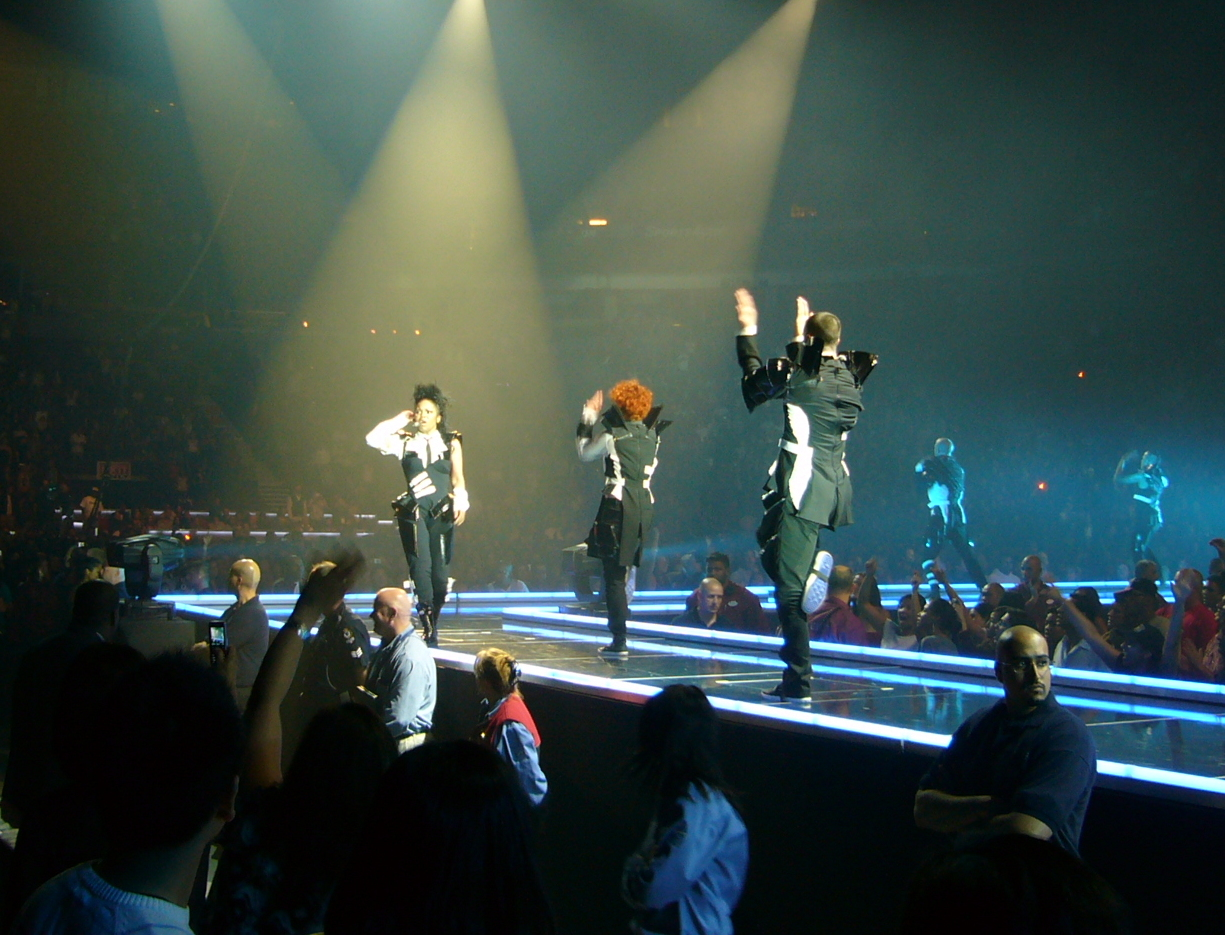
Jackson performing "All Nite (Don't Stop)" on the Rock Witchu Tour of 2008.

"All Nite (Don't Stop)" received positive reviews from music critics. Mike Trias of Radio and Records said that the track "should not be ignored, especially on the dance floor. Its sexy, midtempo groove is perfect for kicking a party into after hours". Gail Mitchell of Billboard commended it as a "beat-bangin' number" with "infectious allure", affirming that "Jackson steps back into her signature groove line with this bass-driven party jam". Mitchell also regarded it as among Jackson's strongest material, adding that its chorus and "relentless beat" will remain "embedded in your consciousness long after the last note has sounded". Tareck Ghoneim of Contactmusic.com considered it an "interesting" and "infectious" blend of "upbeat samba/dance rhythms and definite funk influence", with "[e]lectro samples, latin percussion and some groans and breaths to give it a sexy ambience". Its aura "on a rnb tip" was considered to have "loads of crossover potential" for several airplay formats. Ghoneim added, "it certainly doesn't strike me as a typical Janet record", citing it as another evolution from "those 'Nasty' days" in "maintaining that dance-pop influence but making it slightly more cool". Chuck Arnold of People described it as a "hypnotic pop number", while Rashod D. Ollison from The Baltimore Sun labeled it a "get-on-up dance cut" which "rides a looping funk guitar line".

Veronica Heffernan from The New York Times praised its "clubby, big-room beats", analyzing its production as "strictly machine-made, with Jackson's sweetheart voice protected by layers of effects". Spence D. of IGN heralded the song as an electro funk number which effectively "gets the blood pumping and the booty primed for shaking". The Guardian's Alexis Petridis called it "a nervy tune", noting the song's "impossibly lithe bassline", while praising it as "not only inventive, but brilliantly constructed". Sal Cinquemani from Slant Magazine called it a "pulsating club track", while Aidin Vaziri of San Francisco Chronicle regarded it as the best song from the album, and the best dance song since New Order's "Bizarre Love Triangle". Pitchfork's Chris Ott called it "genius" and rated it three and a half out of four stars, qualifying it as part of the "mashup craze" in which artists were "dreaming up new, ear-catching juxtapositions to dazzle radio". Ott labeled it as "a notable standout", while praising the track's "borderline dancehall/Latin club rhythms". BBC UK's Top of the Pops website exclaimed the track "hits you with about three different basslines and a bonafide booty-quaker of a beat", transitioning into one of her "classic Jackson key-changes" during the chorus. Asian entertainment outlet Fridae qualified it as "chart-friendly", "bass-line driven", and "burning from the explicit references". Tom Moon of The Philadelphia Inquirer called it a moment "when everything clicks" on the album, adding that its "primal quality" ultimately "juxtaposes Jackson's ethereal yearning against agitated synthesizers". "All Nite (Don't Stop)" won the award for Best Pop Song at the 2005 BMI London Awards.

== Chart performance ==
The song's chart success was largely affected by the blacklist of Jackson's singles and music videos which followed her controversial Super Bowl halftime show incident with Justin Timberlake. The song did not chart on the US Billboard Hot 100 chart, but did peak at number 33 on the Mainstream Top 40 chart, and number one on the Hot Dance Club Play chart. It also reached number eight on Hot Dance Airplay. In March 2008, after the release of Jackson's tenth studio album Discipline, the song reached number 40 the Hot Singles Sales chart, four years after its initial release. Internationally, it was released as a double A-side with "I Want You". In Australia, "All Nite (Don't Stop)" debuted and peaked at number 24 on the issue dated July 4, 2004, staying on the ARIA Charts for 10 weeks. In New Zealand, it peaked at number 39 during its only week on the chart.

In the United Kingdom, "All Nite (Don't Stop)" debuted and peaked at number 19 on the UK Singles Chart on the week of June 19, 2004, spending five weeks on the chart. Music Week magazine noted that despite Jackson's high-profile promotional visit to the region, she had not had a top 10 single since "All for You" (2001). In Belgium, it peaked at number 21 in the Flemish region, while reaching one position lower in Wallonia. In Italy, the song entered the singles chart at number 47, and reached number 30 weeks later, spending five weeks inside the chart. In the Netherlands, "All Nite (Don't Stop)" entered the singles' chart at number 95 during the week of June 26, 2004. It eventually reached number 35, staying a total of five weeks on the chart. On the Swiss Singles Chart dated June 20, 2004, "All Nite (Don't Stop)" debuted at number 78, reaching its peak of number 76 the next week, spending only four weeks on the chart.

== Music video ==
Jackson dances in an abandoned hotel during a blackout in the music video, with power restored during the finale (pictured).

The music video for "All Nite (Don't Stop)" was directed by Francis Lawrence, who previously directed "Someone to Call My Lover" and several of Jackson's other videos, and edited by Dustin Robertson. It was filmed from April 16–17, 2004 and premiered online on May 13, 2004. The video was filmed at the abandoned El Dorado Hotel in the Skid Row neighborhood of Los Angeles, California. Choreographed by Gil Duldulao, it took a minimal approach in comparison to Jackson's prior clips, focusing heavily on intricate choreographed routines as well as gay-friendly themes amongst several of Jackson's dancers. The setting of the music clip is inside a "derelict" building during a power outage. The video begins with Jackson's dancers sprawled on bordello furniture in a "cavernous" ballroom inside the building where the air is "cloudy with sawdust or dance chalk". Then one of the dancers winds a copper wire from a stereo system around a car battery to generate power in the abandoned building. Jackson is then shown, her face covered with a hat and long bangs. As the video progresses, Jackson switches between solo and group dancing, schowcasing snapping, jerking, jazz, hip-hop, and yoga-influenced moves, including scenes where Jackson simulates masturbation as her dancers perform similar suggestive moves. The video closes with the illumination of a neon Damita Jo logo, used to "turn the makeshift studio into a real stage set".

After Jackson's Super Bowl halftime show incident, MTV and many other music channels owned by companies involved in producing the event blacklisted her videos from rotation. However, a slightly edited version of the visual was shown on channels such as MuchMusic and BET, which aired an edited version which removes all sexual content. The outlets faced criticism for removing a kiss between two female dancers. Speaking to The New York Blade, GLAAD's entertainment director Stephen Macias commented, "I think it's always a concern when the gay and lesbian community is not allowed to be depicted in the same way that the straight community is, and especially when that revolves around the way our relationships and romantic situations are depicted". Macias added that Jackson supports gay causes and has been persistently active in portraying equality among the gay community and would not approve the edit. The excerpt concluded, "A number of networks and broadcasters have gone to a heightened state of self-censorship since the uproar over Jackson's Super Bowl performance, for fear of being fined".

Virginia Heffernan of The New York Times praised the video as being "clever", "brave", and "sexually restless" with "adventures in exhibitionism [that] often seem to involve relatively small patches of skin, coupled with raunchy gyrations". She compared the video's theme of "orgiastic dancing by candlelight" to the Northeast blackout of 2003, using the "civics lesson" of a dancer winding a copper wire from a stereo system around a car battery to generate power in an abandoned building. Hefferanan concluded that the "lo-fi" choreography of the clip is in opposition to making "a gaudy show of her rapport with her dancers". The New York Blade considered it "certainly provocative", as "Jackson and her dancers get hot and heavy with one another to the song's thumping, infectious beat", while King placed the video as third on their list of "Favorite Janet Jackson Videos", describing it as "lots of writhing". The video received several nominations on awards, such as the 20th Annual International Dance Music Awards, in the categories of "Best Dance Video" and "Best Choreography", MVPA Awards for "Best Choreography", with its director Francis Laurence being nominated for "Best Direction of a Female Artist" and winning "Director of the Year", for multiple videos including "All Nite (Don't Stop)".

== Live performances ==
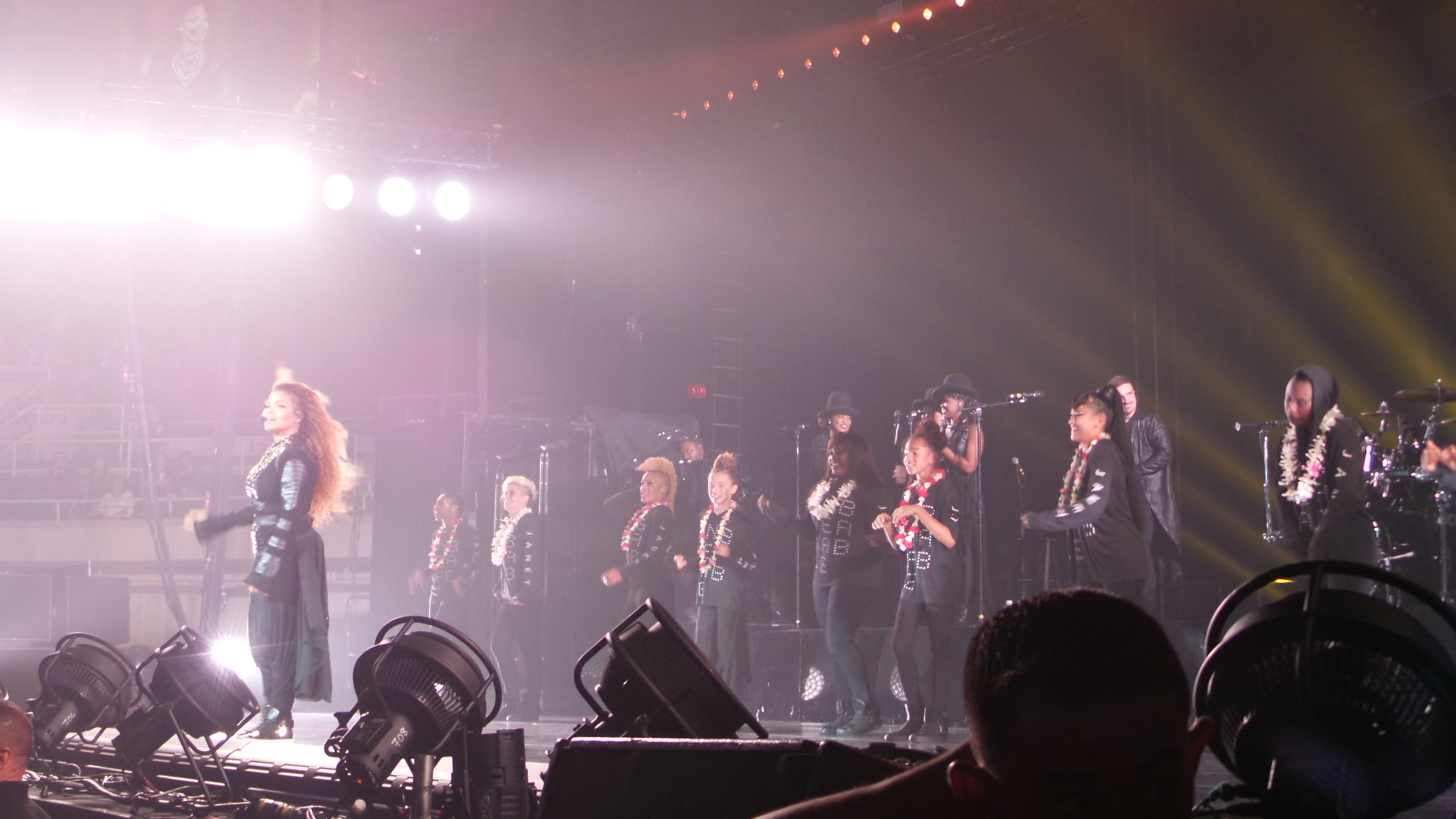
Jackson and her dancers performing "All Nite (Don't Stop)" during her Unbreakable World Tour (2015–16).

Jackson performed "All Nite (Don't Stop)" for the first time on Good Morning America on March 31, 2004. It was followed by another performance at On Air with Ryan Seacrest two days later, filmed during midday in Los Angeles amid a shopping center filled with spectators. Both performances were aired with a time delay, per the FCC's guidelines, due to Justin Timberlake's and Jackson's controversial Super Bowl accident. Despite the blacklisting, on April 10, Jackson was the host and performer on Saturday Night Live, with performances of "All Nite (Don't Stop)" and "Strawberry Bounce". Her appearance on the show garnered its highest ratings in over two years. She also performed the song on The Tonight Show with Jay Leno on April 29, 2004, MSN Music's studios in Seattle on May 14, and the annual Wango Tango the day after. In late May, Jackson traveled to Japan to perform the song on the 2004 Video Music Awards Japan, where she was the recipient of the "Inspiration Award". The singer then traveled to Europe for promotion, performing "All Nite (Don't Stop)" on popular shows such as the British Top of the Pops, among other events, such as Italy's Festivalbar. In June, the single was performed at the BET Awards as part of a medley with "R&B Junkie", during which Elephant Man made an appearance for his verses from the "So So Def Remix" of the song. Jackson also performed the single at New York's Gay Pride March, along with her 1997 smash hit "Together Again".

Since its release in 2004, "All Nite (Don't Stop)" has been performed on each of Jackson's subsequent tours. It was included on the setlist of her 2008 Rock Witchu Tour, her first tour in seven years, at the time. The song was later included on some dates of the Number Ones, Up Close and Personal Tour in 2011, with Jackson dedicating the song to her fans in Jakarta, Indonesia, and Hidalgo, Texas. The singer also performed "All Nite (Don't Stop)" on the 2015–16 Unbreakable World Tour, wearing an arms-length black jumpsuit with an oversized necklace. It was also included on the State of the World Tour in 2017–2019. In 2019, the song was included on the setlist for the singer's Janet Jackson: Metamorphosis concert residency in Las Vegas. That same year, Janet Jackson: A Special 30th Anniversary Celebration of Rhythm Nation tour's setlist began with the song. In 2023, the singer performed "All Nite (Don't Stop)" at The Woodlands (Texas) stop on her Janet Jackson: Together Again tour. The song was performed for her 2024–2025 Janet Jackson: Las Vegas residency.

== Usage in media ==
British DJ and producer Switch sampled "All Nite (Don't Stop)" on the song "This is Sick", under the stage moniker 'Solid Groove'. Dance troupe Fanny Pak performed the song on an episode of America's Best Dance Crew titled "Janet Jackson Challenge", which paid tribute to her iconic choreography and videos. It was also performed by contestants on Oxygen's Dance Your Ass Off. The song is included in the 18th edition of the Guinness book British Hit Singles & Albums and is mentioned in Nicole Austin's novel The Boy Next Door.

In March 2018, singer and dancer Britney Spears posted a video working out to "All Nite (Don't Stop)" on her Instagram account. She would use the song again in a video for her Instagram in July 2023, where she appeared dancing wearing white knee-high boots, turquoise bikini bottoms and white crop top.

== Track listings ==
- iTunes EP
1. Album Version – 3:26
2. "I Want You" – 4:12
3. "Put Your Hands On" – 3:56
4. Sander Kleinenberg's Radio Mix – 4:14
5. "I Want You" (Ray Roc Radio Mix) – 4:18
- UK promotional 12-inch single
1. Sander Kleinenberg Club Mix – 8:50
2. Low End Specialists Main Mix – 8:48
- UK 12-inch single
1. Album Version – 3:26
2. Sander Kleinenberg Everybody Club Mix – 8:50
3. "I Want You" – 4:12
4. So So Def Remix – 3:51
- UK CD single
1. Album Version – 3:26
2. "I Want You" – 4:12
3. "Put Your Hands On" – 3:56
4. Sander Kleinenberg's Radio Mix – 4:14
5. "I Want You" (Ray Roc Radio Mix) – 4:18
6. "All Nite (Don't Stop)" (Video)
7. "I Want You" (Video)
- US promotional 12-inch single
1. "All Nite (Don't Stop)" (So So Def Remix) – 3:51
2. "All Nite (Don't Stop)" (So So Def Instrumental) – 3:48
3. "All Nite (Don't Stop)" (A Cappella) – 3:51
4. R&B Junkie – 3:11
5. R&B Junkie (Instrumental) – 3:11
6. "All Nite (Don't Stop)" (Clean Version) – 3:28
- US promotional double 12-inch single
1. Sander Kleinenberg Everybody Remix – 8:40
2. Low End Specialists Main Mix – 8:48
3. Sander Kleinenberg Dub – 8:40
4. Low End Specialists Dub – 8:48
- US promotional CD single
1. So So Def Remix – 3:51
2. So So Def Remix Instrumental – 3:48
3. So So Def A Cappella – 3:51
4. Album Version – 3:28
- US CD single
1. Album Version – 3:26
2. "I Want You" – 4:12
3. "Put Your Hands On" – 3:56
- European CD single
1. Album Version – 3:26
2. "I Want You" – 4:12
- Australian CD single
1. Album Version – 3:26
2. "I Want You" – 4:12
3. "Put Your Hands On" – 3:56
4. Sander Kleinenberg's Radio Mix – 4:14
- Japanese CD single
1. Album Version – 3:26
2. Sander Kleinenberg Everybody Club Mix – 8:42
3. "I Want You" – 4:12
4. So So Def Remix – 3:51

== Credits and personnel ==
Credits and personnel are adapted from Damita Jo album liner notes.

- Janet Jackson – vocals, songwriter, producer
- James Harris III – songwriter
- Terry Lewis – songwriter
- Tony "Prof T" Tolbert – songwriter
- Anders Bagge – songwriter, producer, arranger, programmer, recording
- Arnthor Birgisson – songwriter, producer, arranger, programmer, recording
- Herbie Hancock – songwriter
- Paul Jackson – songwriter
- Melvin Ragin – songwriter
- Lee Gloves – programming
- Rob Haggett – assistant programming
- Anders Herrlin – additional programming
- Jennie Löfgren – additional programming
- Henrik Brunberg – assistant engineer
- Mark "Spike" Stent – mixing
- David Treahearn – assistant mixing

== Charts ==
=== Weekly charts ===
2004 weekly chart performance for "All Nite (Don't Stop)"
Chart (2004)	Peak position
Australia (ARIA)	24
Australian Urban (ARIA)	9
Belgium (Ultratop 50 Flanders)	21
Belgium (Ultratop 50 Wallonia)	22
Canada CHR/Pop Top 30 (Radio & Records)	25
Germany (GfK)	48
Ireland (IRMA)	26
Italy (FIMI)	30
Netherlands (Single Top 100)	35
New Zealand (Recorded Music NZ)	39
Romania (Romanian Top 100)	21
Scotland Singles (Official Charts) with "I Want You"	23
Spain (PROMUSICAE)	13
Switzerland (Schweizer Hitparade)	76
UK Singles (Official Charts) with "I Want You"	19
UK Dance (Official Charts) with "I Want You"	5
UK Hip Hop/R&B (Official Charts) with "I Want You"	3
US Bubbling Under Hot 100 (Billboard)	19
US Dance Club Songs (Billboard)	1
US Dance Singles Sales (Billboard)	6
US Dance Airplay (Billboard)	8
US Hot R&B/Hip-Hop Songs (Billboard)	90
US Pop Airplay (Billboard)	33

2008 weekly chart performance for "All Nite (Don't Stop)"
Chart (2008)	Peak position
US Hot Singles Sales (Billboard)	40

=== Year-end charts ===
Year-end chart performance for "All Nite (Don't Stop)"
Chart (2004)	Position
Belgium (Ultratop 50 Flanders)	86
US Dance Club Play (Billboard)	30

== Release history ==
Release dates and formats for "All Nite (Don't Stop)"
Region	Date	Format(s)	Label(s)	Ref.
United States	May 17, 2004	Contemporary hit radio	Virgin	
Germany	June 7, 2004	12-inch vinyl; maxi CD	EMI	
United Kingdom	June 7, 2004	12-inch vinyl; CD; maxi CD	Virgin	
France	June 8, 2004	12-inch vinyl	EMI	
Japan	July 7, 2004	Maxi CD	EMI	
