= Janet Megamix 04 =

Song

Promotional single by Janet Jackson
- Released: December 11, 2003
- Genre: Dance-pop; R&B; hip hop; house
- Length: 11:21 (Megamix); 4:15 (Radio Edit)
- Label: Virgin
- Songwriter: Janet Jackson
- Producers: Janet Jackson; Chris Cox

"Janet Megamix 04" is a megamix produced by DJ Chris Cox, released on December 11, 2003, to promote Jackson's February 2004 Super Bowl halftime show.

== Song information ==
The Chris Cox-produced megamix contains thirteen of Jackson's past singles, and was released prior to the lead single from 2004's Damita Jo, "Just a Little While". During the production of the remix, Cox's studio in California was ravaged by a wildfire, and the DJ had to evacuate it midway through the project. The single entered the Billboard Hot Dance Club Play chart at number thirty-four and charted for eleven weeks, peaking at number three in early March 2004.

The full megamix includes (in order of appearance) That's the Way Love Goes", "Son of a Gun (I Betcha Think This Song Is About You)", "If", "Got 'til It's Gone", "Doesn't Really Matter", "Go Deep", "You Want This", "All for You", "I Get Lonely", "Someone to Call My Lover", "Throb", "Again", and "Together Again".

The single was released in several international territories but was not eligible for mainstream charts as it was not released commercially. The only version available on a commercial format is the Chris Cox Radio Edit which appears as a B-side to the UK CD single of "Just a Little While".

== Music video ==
A music video for "Janet Megamix 04" was produced using the radio edit version of the track and consists of a montage of footage from Jackson's other videos used in the single. The video has never been released commercially, but can be found on YouTube.

== Track listings and formats ==
U.S. promo CD single (708761831320)
UK promo CD single (708761833522)

1. "Janet Megamix 04" (Chris Cox Radio Edit) – 4:15
2. "Janet Megamix 04" (Chris Cox Club Megamix) – 11:21
3. "Janet Megamix 04" (Hard Cox Mega Dub) – 8:21

== Official remixes ==
- Chris Cox Radio Edit – 4:15
- Chris Cox Club Megamix – 11:21
- Hard Cox Mega Dub – 8:21

== Charts ==
Chart (2004)	Peak position
U.S. Billboard Hot Dance Club Play	3
