= Damita Jo (album) =

Studio album by Janet Jackson
- Released: March 22, 2004
- Recorded: August 2002 – February 2004
- Studios: DARP (Atlanta); Platinum Sound; Sony Music (New York City); Flyte Time; Larrabee Sound; Record Plant (Los Angeles); Murlyn (Stockholm)
- Genres: R&B; pop; hip-hop
- Length: 65:02
- Label: Virgin
- Producers: Jimmy Jam and Terry Lewis; Janet Jackson; Dallas Austin; Babyface; Anders Bagge; Scott Storch; Télépopmusik; Kanye West; Rockwilder; The Avila Brothers

Janet Jackson chronology
All for You (2001)	Damita Jo (2004)	20 Y.O. (2006)

Singles from Damita Jo
- 1. "Just a Little While" Released: February 2, 2004; 2. "I Want You" Released: February 22, 2004; 3. "All Nite (Don't Stop)" Released: May 17, 2004

Damita Jo is the eighth studio album by American singer Janet Jackson. EMI Music Japan released it first in Japan on March 22, 2004, before its release in Europe by EMI a week later. It was released in the United States by Virgin Records on March 30, 2004. Jackson began work on the album in August 2002, after finishing the All for You Tour, and continued until February 2004, with help from a wide range of producers including Kenneth "Babyface" Edmonds, Dallas Austin, Kanye West, and Scott Storch, in addition to Jackson's longtime collaborators, duo Jimmy Jam and Terry Lewis. Titled after Jackson's middle name, Damita Jo is an R&B, pop and hip-hop album that explores themes of love and romance.

Damita Jo debuted at number two on the US Billboard 200. To promote it, three singles were released: "Just a Little While", "I Want You" and "All Nite (Don't Stop)", while "R&B Junkie" was issued as a promotional single. Damita Jo received mixed reviews from music critics, who praised its production but were dismissive of its excessive sexual content and its overlong duration. It was nominated for Best Contemporary R&B Album, while "I Want You" received a nomination for Best Female R&B Vocal Performance at the 47th Annual Grammy Awards. The album sold three million copies worldwide.

Jackson's performance at the Super Bowl XXXVIII halftime show prior to the album's release, which ended in her breast being controversially exposed by surprise guest Justin Timberlake, had a major effect on the album's commercial performance. Conglomerates involved with the broadcast who received massive fines from the U.S. Federal Communications Commission (FCC), including Viacom and subsidiaries CBS, MTV and Infinity Broadcasting, enforced a blacklist of Jackson's singles and music videos, although Timberlake remained unaffected. The blacklisting drew controversy amongst critics, who declared the album and its singles to likely have been commercially successful had the incident not occurred.

== Background and development ==
In April 2001, Jackson released her seventh studio album All for You. It saw the singer working with new producers for the first time since Control (1986) while maintaining her partnership with Jimmy Jam and Terry Lewis. It debuted at number one in the United States, selling 605,128 copies on its first week, and had sold 3.1 million copies across the country as of September 2009, according to Nielsen SoundScan. Its title track became the first song by a female artist in the decade to reach number one in the United States, where it remained for seven weeks, becoming her second-longest single to stay at the top. All for You received three nominations at the 44th Annual Grammy Awards, eventually winning Best Dance Recording for the title track. Following the album's release, Jackson embarked on the All for You Tour, which grossed over US$40 million in ticket sales.

Upon completion of the tour in 2002, Jackson started recording a new album. Her longtime collaborator, Jimmy Jam, stated that they "talked about a million different possible things to do and finally decided to do a brand-new album", as the singer was "itching to get back in the studio", hoping to release it in early 2003. As Jackson completed work on the album, she was featured as a performer on the Super Bowl XXXVIII halftime show, which took place on February 1, 2004, in Houston. At the end of the performance, guest artist Justin Timberlake pulled off a part of Jackson's costume, which accidentally exposed her right breast. Although the costume tear was orchestrated, her breast's exposure was not the intended result. However, the singer suffered backlash from the media; a 2004 Associated Press report speculated that the incident was a publicity stunt for her then-upcoming album.

== Writing and recording ==
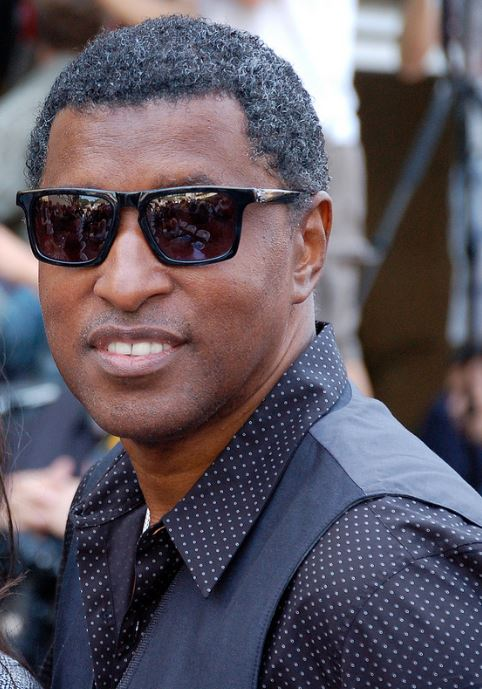
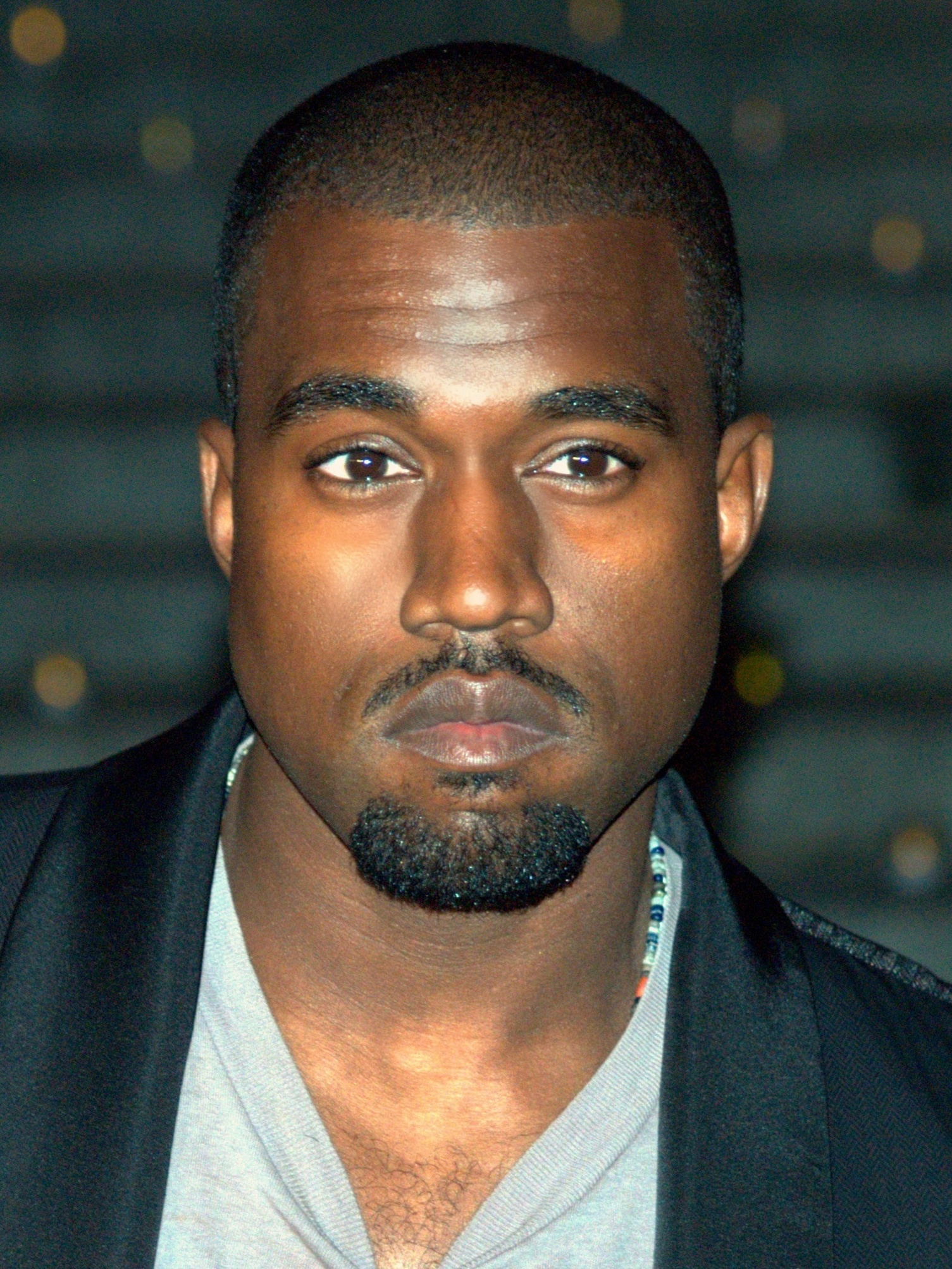
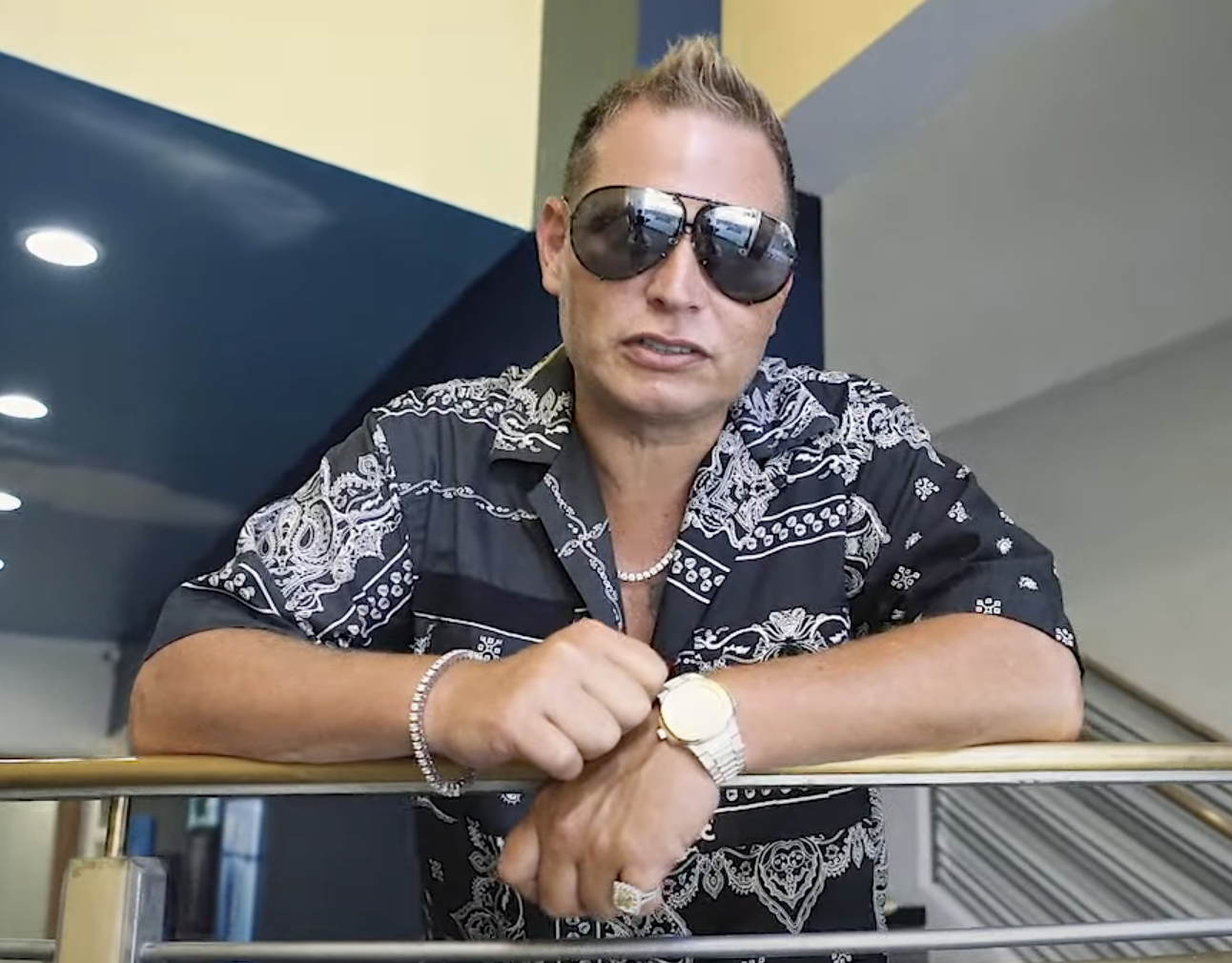
Damita Jo features contributions from Kenneth "Babyface" Edmonds, Kanye West, and Scott Storch (clockwise).

Recording sessions for Damita Jo lasted for a total of 18 months, the longest Jackson had spent recording an album. Jackson began work on the record in August 2002, reuniting with Jam and Lewis for initial writing sessions, and concluded in February 2004. During its initial sessions, Jam described its musical direction as "all over the place", from Jackson's usual house songs to "guitar-flavored things", as well as some having "a definite sort of ambient quality to them". He clarified that was not a clear direction at that moment; they would write songs and see what they liked or not, as part of the discovery process. He also revealed that they had been listening to Zero 7 and Télépopmusik during the process – the latter produced an interlude for the album.

The record saw Jackson teaming up with several new producers, among them Kenneth "Babyface" Edmonds, Kanye West, Dallas Austin, Scott Storch, and duo Bag & Arnthor, consisting of Anders Bagge and Arnthor Birgisson, in addition to Jam and Lewis. Sessions with West took place in October 2003; he described their work together as "unbelievable". Austin worked with Jackson in Atlanta from late 2003 until early 2004 before deciding which songs would make the final cut. He considered it "easily the most sexy thing she's done" and that it was "her Dirty Mind". He also described it as a "really sexy record, but not in a sensual way. It's bold, it's fun, it's really positive. Nobody's sad, nobody's mad. It's just really fun songs where she happens to be talking frankly about sex". From his point of view, it was also "one of the best records she's made". Songwriter Sean Garrett described being "starstruck", calling the session an essential part of his early career. "I thought working with Janet would change my life and it definitely did. The record put another big name on my list, but that was a really cool experience".

Several collaborations were considered during the album's recording sessions. Jam discussed potentially writing a duet with Timberlake for the album in its initial stages, but never came to fruition. Additionally, collaborations with Richard X and Basement Jaxx were announced, although they did not happen. Sessions with Daniel Bedingfield, Mario Winans, and Diddy were also planned but did not take place. Other sessions with producers such as duo Dre & Vidal and 7 Aurelius took place, with the former revealing that he and Jackson had made "cutting edge, hard-hitting dance music" for Damita Jo. However, the tracks did not appear on the final product.

Like her previous releases, the concept for Damita Jo was influenced by Jackson's life and feelings at the time. Jam stated, "Her albums are always what she's thinking at the moment. [...] Her thoughts may change six months from now. Her biggest thing is to be honest with her fans. Whatever stuff she wants to talk about, it's coming from her heart". The singer confessed that she was "divulging myself a little more on this album, and it's definitely much more intimate. That's another side of myself that people have seen, but not to this level". Comparing the process of producing to directing, Jackson searched for "sensitive people who can technically express what I'm going through emotionally" when seeking new collaborators. The singer considered writing a song about the incident at her Super Bowl performance to express her concerns, as nearly seven songs had not been completed by that point.

== Composition ==
=== Themes ===
"A songwriter is like a novelist. You invent characters. Because they're born out of your brain, they reflect you. But good characters are independent of you and live lives of their own. I hope Strawberry is a good character. Sexually, she's on fire. She doesn't mince words. She has to have it and doesn't care who knows it".

— Jackson on the album's characters

Damita Jo's lyrical content is divided between themes of love and romance, discussing lust and monogamous intimacy. An underlying theme of alternate personalities is explored, with Jackson's substitute personae "Damita Jo" and "Strawberry" appearing on several songs. Jackson explained that the record shows different characters of her personality which she displays at different moments in her life, as well as a "more private side" to her. Spliced between several songs are "mystifying" interludes, in which the singer attempts to intimately communicate her inner thoughts with the listener. Commenting on the album's themes, Jackson said:

"If there's any obsession at all, it's this culture's demand that we be sexually categorized as either gay, straight or bi. [...] I do think they oversimplify sexuality. If we accept those categories, we feel constrained to choose. But the categories are artificial and often arbitrary. We aren't one thing but many things. We're everything at once. At different times in our life – at different times in the course of a single day – we respond in different ways. The common denominator shouldn't be sexual preference. It should be love. I like to think Damita Jo is all about love".

Alternate identities presented include "Damita Jo", an aggressive persona mentioned during the album's title track and "Sexhibition", as well as "Strawberry", a lascivious performer who emerges on "Strawberry Bounce". Speaking about the personae, Jackson said, "She's another way to express and expose a deeper part of me". She detailed their personalities, revealing that Damita Jo was a lot harsher and "quick to put you in your place", whereas Strawberry was the most sexual of them all and the wildest one. Rob Tannenbaum wrote in an article for Blender that the latter identity represents "a time when she doesn't need to be the polite, professional Janet, and can turn into raw, unrestrained Strawberry". Jackson added, "It's not an everyday indulgence. Not even every week. But every now and then I like playing around in that mode." She further said that the characters "absolutely" live inside of her, and "it feels wonderful" to release them. Following the incident at the Super Bowl halftime show, Jackson was urged to remove or tone down the suggestive lyrics of several songs but resisted pressure to do so. "A lot of people had concerns and wanted me to take certain songs off the album, but I refused, because in doing so I wouldn't be who I am. I'm not going to change, and that's fine. Either they like it, or they don't", she stated.

=== Music and lyrics ===
The album's opening monologue, "Looking for Love", serves as a prelude to the album's content of romance and passion. Jackson deciphers society's unification within the desire for affection in a breathy tone over a spatial and "dreamy" electronic backing: "So many different characters live within us – all looking for love". The second song, "Damita Jo", is composed of hip-hop and brittle funk. The instrumentation includes bells, cat calls, and rap inflected scratches, with "shyly sexual" vocals. Thematically, the singer describes her alter persona as being "Sexy, quiet / Shy but down for a good time" but also asserting that "There's another side, that I don't hide, but might never show". Next track "Sexhibition" is an electro-infused funk song composed of "cleverly crafted" verbal puns, delivered with "saucy assertiveness". The song opens with rattling tablas and stuttering guitars. In the lyrics, Jackson again sings from the point of view of "Damita Jo", in "intermittent vocal bubbles" to discuss the pleasures she intends to provide; she states "Relax, it's just sex", at the song's closing.

"Strawberry Bounce"
Jackson portrays alternate persona "Strawberry" on "Strawberry Bounce", over a beat which fuses new-school hip-hop with pop music.

"SloLove"
A mid-tempo house-influenced dance-pop track, "SloLove" is accompanied by Jackson's breathy vocals.

The fourth track, "Strawberry Bounce", depicts Jackson method acting a sensual display as alter ego "Strawberry"; characterizing herself as a one-woman gentleman's club, Jackson asks her partner to "Let me be your playground". The song morphs a sample of Jay-Z's vocals into its instrumentation of chimes, snapping rhythms, and synthesizers. Fusing new-school hip-hop with pop music, she sings "watch the way I pump it, the way it works is gonna keep you comin'", in a "feverish pant". "My Baby" features guest vocals from Kanye West over an acoustic-flavoured hip-hop production, as Jackson delivers the chorus in a reassuring manner, described as a "sotto voce purr". It is a love song about butterflies in the protagonist's stomach. "The Islands" is a spoken-word segment in which the singer confesses her admiration for the island of Anguilla, the beach, and tropical humidity. The interlude segues into "Spending Time with You", which captures Jackson in a moment of love, as she sings, "Use all our energy / Under the moonlight making love".

The singer speaks about evenings relaxing in prior said location in brief interlude "Magic Hour", which transitions to "Island Life", the album's ninth track. In "Island Life", Jackson refers to herself and a companion in an exotic paradise in a lilting vocal: "Island in the sun, just you and I will go/Ride into the wave like echo". Its instrumentation contains throbbing bass and light concoctions of Caribbean-influenced music and ragga pop. "All Nite (Don't Stop)", the album's third single and tenth track, contains elements of electro-funk and house, with influences of samba, grime, and Latin percussion. The lyrics discuss being addicted to dancing in a club setting. Next track "R&B Junkie" is a salute to old school R&B, which transforms a brief sample from Evelyn King into a new composition. Built over a pitched-up sample of B. T. Express' "Close to You", "I Want You" is influenced by Motown music of the 1950s. The song's instrumentation includes a chime-studded texture, violins, heavy drums, and a girl-group arrangement over production described as an "electronic reconstruction".

Starting with "infectious" "doo-doo-doo-doo-doos", 13th track "Like You Don't Love Me" is a "demand for a good, vigorous fuck": "You need to make love to me / Like you don't love me", she sings. Backed by acoustic guitars on the ballad "Thinkin' 'Bout My Ex", Jackson displays humanity in the song's topic of longing for a former companion while in a new relationship. She apologizes to her current partner: "When I'm holding you late at night / I'm thinkin' about my ex [...] And I know sorry doesn't mend your broken heart". "Warmth" is described as an "aural journey" in which Jackson performs oral sex on her partner while in a moving vehicle. Jackson again displays method acting; whispers and moans are heard, as Jackson compliments her companion and performs with authority over the track's minimal "bass thump": "Just like the water from the shore / Let your rain pour [...] But nothing can compare to the warmth of my mouth." Jackson sings over the light sound of rain and thunder, representing climax and ecstasy. Grouped together in an "oral suite", the erotic tone continues on "Moist", in which Jackson is on the receiving end of pleasure. Lyrically, she addresses at how her lover is "about to make the rain come down".

Brief interlude "It All Comes Down to Love" sees the singer describing love as truthful, honest, undeniable, sincere, and unforgettable. Next song "Truly" has a quiet storm production, with Jackson's vocal delivery being described as "feathery, layered and almost hypnotic". The lyrics were described as being about "all-out love". Interlude "The One" accompanies Jackson's final monologue of romance with flourishes of electronic music, leading to "SloLove", a house-influenced dance-pop song accompanied by Jackson's vocal breathiness. In interlude "Country", the singer explains the origin of her middle name and questions herself whether it is a country name, while a banjo is played. The album's final track is lead single "Just a Little While", which combines new wave guitar and keyboards. Thematically, the lyrics are about Jackson just wanting a "zipless fuck" with her lover and also alludes to masturbation.

== Packaging and release ==
The album's title, Damita Jo, was revealed following Jackson's performance at the Super Bowl XXXVIII halftime show on February 1, 2004, through a press release; it was named after her middle name and one of her alternative personae portrayed by the singer on the album. Jackson had planned to use her middle name for an alternate project but decided to use the concept at that time rather than waiting. The singer previously desired to record an album which was a "complete departure" from what she was known for and title it after her middle name, as she "really didn't want anyone to know that it was me singing on the album"; however, she was convinced to use the title by Austin when they were sharing their own middle names during the recording sessions. Jackson used the title as self-acceptance, as she was never comfortable using the name, presuming "Jo" was for her father Joseph as he was emotionally withdrawn. She further stated that Damita Jo was "definitely who I am today, in all her schizophrenic personalities".

The album artwork for Damita Jo was shot by Andrew McPherson. On the cover, Jackson appears topless, wearing only low-rise jeans, with her arms wrapped around her shadow-bathed breasts, visually representing the record's intimate and sensual theme. A spokesperson for Jackson had initially denied the picture was for the album, claiming that the image was fabricated. A spokesperson for Virgin explained that the singer "wanted a simple and youthful picture that she felt people would like. It's beautiful, soft. So far, fans love it", adding that "web sites have been going crazy" over the photo. Billboard noted that although the cover had drawn substantial media attention, it was not more provocative than the artworks for previous albums Janet (1993) and All for You (2001). The cover for Damita Jo was considered one of the "30 Hottest Naked Album Covers of All Time" by VH1.

EMI Music Japan released Damita Jo in that country on March 22, 2004, with two bonus tracks: "I'm Here" and "Put Your Hands On". A week later, EMI distributed it in European countries, as well as in Australia, while Virgin Records issued the album in the United Kingdom the same day. On March 30, 2004, Damita Jo was released in the United States through Virgin. A release party was held in New York City the day before its release in the country, which various celebrities attended. On that evening, Jackson was presented a diamond Damita Jo nameplate necklace by Virgin for the album's release, designed by Jacob the Jeweler. Due to its explicit sexual content, Damita Jo carries a Parental Advisory label; for this reason, a clean edition was released, editing five tracks due to its sexual content and omitting two songs entirely – "Warmth" and "Moist". "I'm Here" and "Spending Time with You" were made available for streaming on BET's website.

== Promotion ==
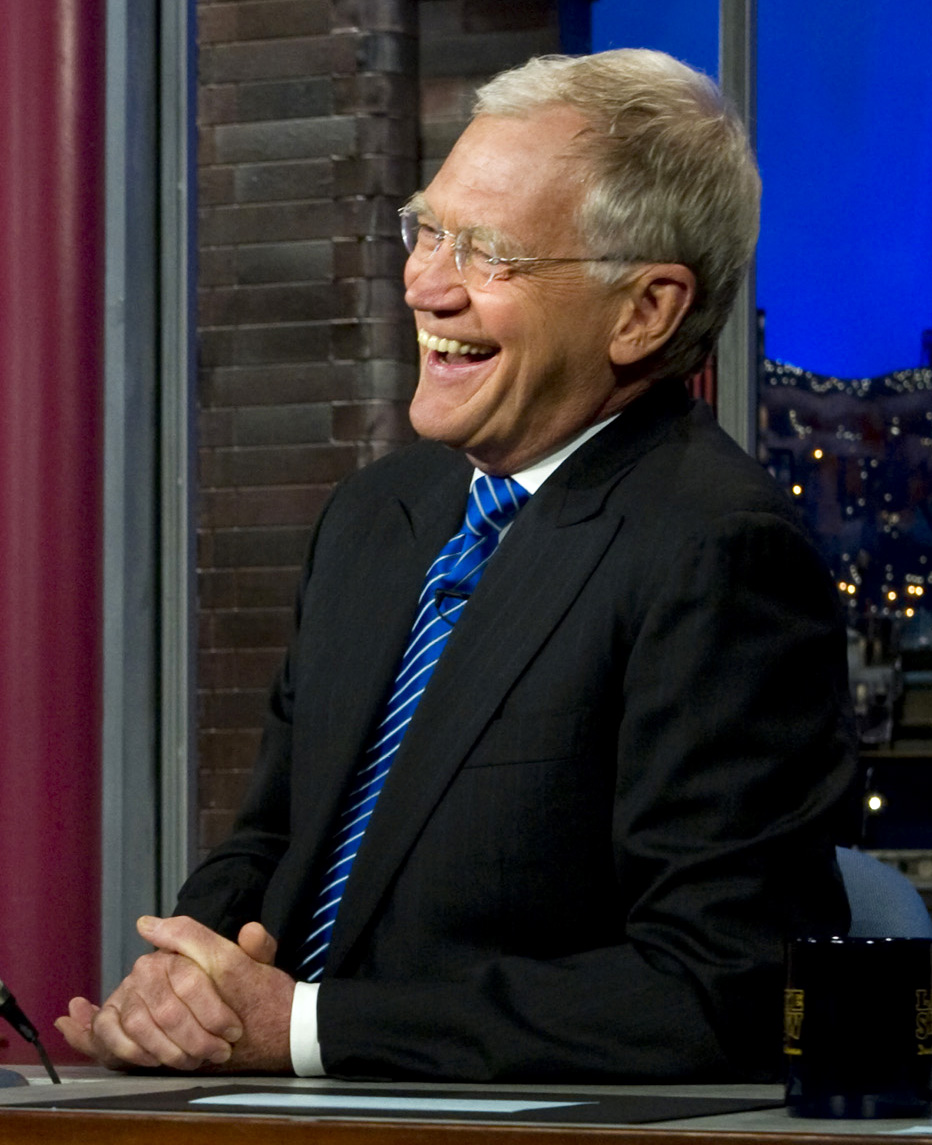
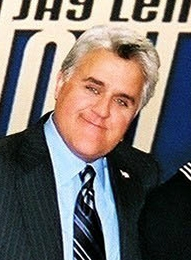
To promote the record, Jackson was interviewed on talk shows hosted by David Letterman (left) and Jay Leno (right).

In March 2004, Billboard reported that Jackson would embark on an extensive promotional tour for Damita Jo, comprising regions such as North America, Europe, and Japan. She first traveled to Europe, appearing on televised shows including TRL UK, Top of the Pops, and CD:UK. Upon returning to the United States, Jackson was interviewed on The Late Show with David Letterman, 106 & Park, and The Tonight Show with Jay Leno. The singer was then a guest on Good Morning America and On Air with Ryan Seacrest, with the shows being aired with a five-second delay due to concerns in the aftermath of her Super Bowl performance. She was the host and performer on Saturday Night Live; the show's network, NBC, insisted that the show would be aired without any delays. With Jackson's appearance, the show garnered its best ratings since 2002.

BET aired About... Janet, where Jackson talked about music and life inspirations, while VH1 documented her life and career on a special for Driven. She also appeared on several magazine covers in the United States, including Ebony, Upscale, and Essence. The singer later traveled to Canada, where she was a guest on Much on Demand, and MuchMoreMusic Live, Jackson made a brief return to her home country to perform at MSN Music's studios and at the Wango Tango concert before moving on to Japan, where she made an unannounced performance at the MTV Video Music Awards Japan and was the recipient of the "Inspiration Award".

Following this, Jackson returned to Europe and was interviewed at Friday Night with Jonathan Ross before performing at Festivalbar in Italy, and on Gala Xacobeo in Spain, as well as appearing on a television special titled Janet hos Jarl, conducted by actor Jarl Friis-Mikkelsen. Upon returning to the United States, the singer made a surprise appearance on New York's Gay Pride March, and performed at the 2004 BET Awards; the awards show was televised without a delay, unlike most television shows which featured Jackson at the time. In November 2003, Jackson's official website confirmed that a world concert tour in support of Damita Jo would take place in summer 2004, following the album's release. Mario Winans was set to be one of the opening acts, but the tour never happened.

=== Singles ===
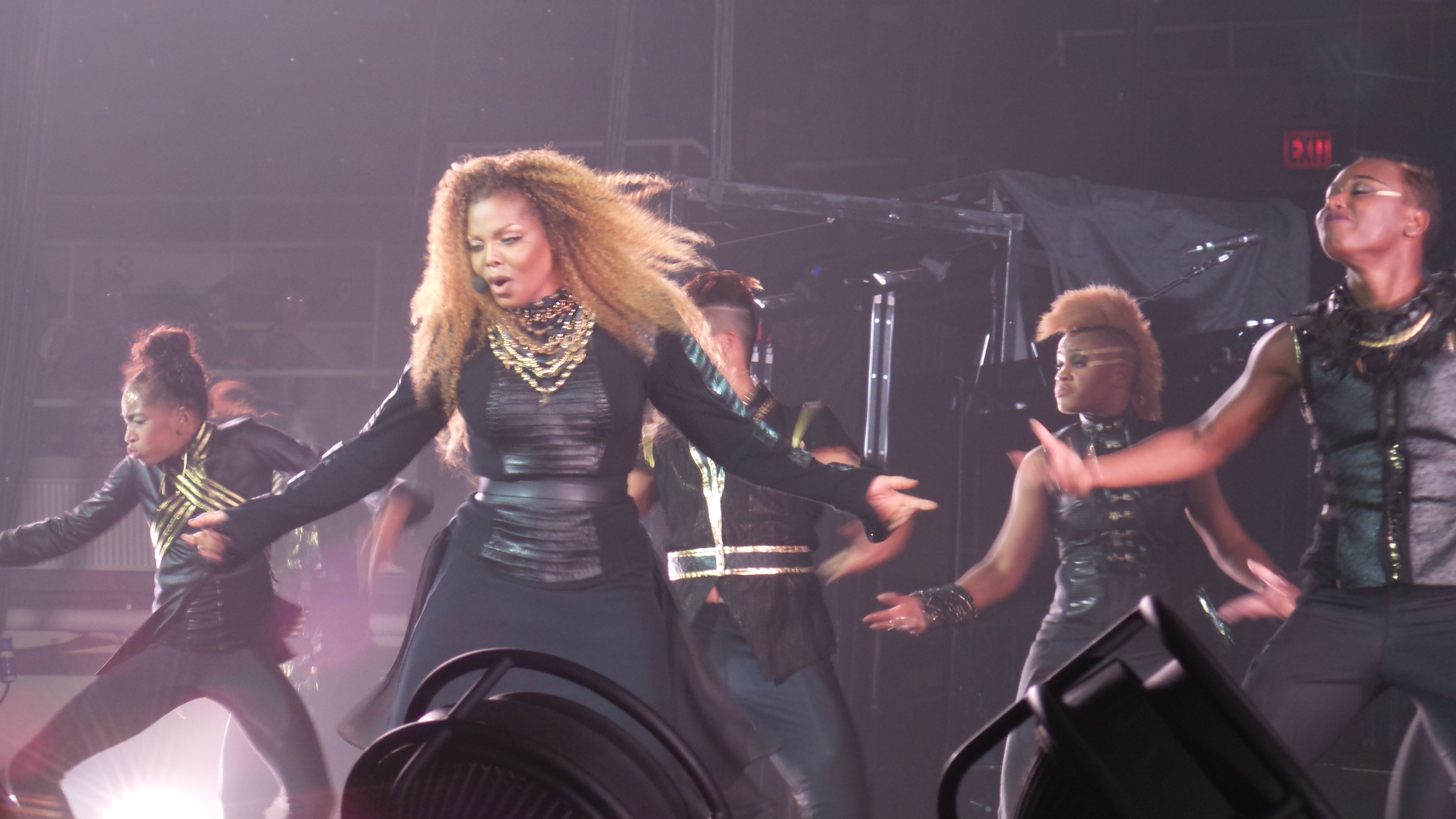
Jackson performing "All Nite (Don't Stop)" on 2015―2016's Unbreakable World Tour; it became the only single from the album not to chart on the US Billboard Hot 100.

Jackson considered "All Nite (Don't Stop)", "My Baby" and "R&B Junkie" for the album's lead single, before deciding on "Just a Little While". The single was released on February 2, 2004, after a premature leak. Following its release, "Just a Little While" quickly became the most added and played song on pop radio formats and achieved "sizeable" downloads, with its airplay increasing over 500% in contrast to those of before its official release. It reached number 45 on the Billboard Hot 100 chart in the United States, being her lowest-peaking single there since "Come Give Your Love to Me" (1983). However, "Just a Little While" peaked atop the Dance Club Songs chart and was a commercial success worldwide, reaching number three in Canada and six in Spain. It also reached the top 10 in Hungary, as well as the top 20 in Australia, Italy, and the United Kingdom.

For the second release, radio stations had shown interest in several potential singles, including "Sexhibition", "Island Life", "Thinkin' 'Bout My Ex", and "My Baby", which Jackson said was "a nice problem to have". "I Want You" was released to digital download on February 22, 2004, and sent to urban radio formats in the United States on March 1, quickly responding to their demand as there was no single planned for the format yet. It generated an audience impression of 21.1 million on formats able to play the song during its first week of release. In the US, "I Want You" reached number 57 on the Billboard Hot 100 chart, while peaking at number 18 on Hot R&B/Hip-Hop Songs, becoming her 33rd consecutive top 40 hit on the chart. The single was later certified platinum by the Recording Industry Association of America (RIAA), denoting shipments of over 1,000,000 copies across the country.

"All Nite (Don't Stop)" was sent to contemporary hit radios as the album's third single on the week of May 17, 2004, in the United States. The single only managed to reach number 19 on the Bubbling Under Hot 100 Singles, an extension of the Billboard Hot 100, but topped the Dance Club Songs chart. In the United Kingdom, it was released as a double A-side with "I Want You", and reached number 19. "All Nite (Don't Stop)" also reached the top 30 in countries such as Australia, Romania, and Spain. Music Week initially confirmed "My Baby" as the album's fourth single, but its release never materialized. On December 30, 2004, "R&B Junkie" was released as a promotional single, topping the Bubbling Under R&B/Hip-Hop Singles, and reaching number 17 on the Adult R&B Songs chart in the US. The album's title track and "My Baby" also charted on the Bubbling Under R&B/Hip-Hop Singles chart without being released as singles, peaking at number 17 and 9, respectively.

== Critical reception ==
Professional ratings
Aggregate scores
Source	Rating
Metacritic	53/100
Review scores
Source	Rating
AllMusic	2/5 stars
Entertainment Weekly	C+
Blender	4/5 stars
The Globe and Mail	1.5/5 stars
The Guardian	4/5 stars
Pitchfork	7.8/10
Q	3/5 stars
Rolling Stone	2/5 stars
Slant Magazine	3/5 stars
USA Today	3/4 stars

Upon its release, Damita Jo received mixed reviews from music critics. The album holds an average score of 53 based on 13 reviews on Metacritic. Steve Jones from USA Today observed that despite negative publicity surrounding the album, Jackson was not "sweating it musically", as she "freely pursues her sexual and love fantasies" on it, noting that "this is a happy, loving Jackson, as prone to romantic walks on the beach as to roadside quickies". For Jones, the singer's new collaborators induced a "freshening" effect while maintaining familiarity to her previous releases. Blender critic Ann Powers considered the record "artfully structured, unapologetically explicit", as well as "erotica at its friendliest and most well-balanced", and noted that it "even erases the memory of Jackson's clunky Super Bowl breast-baring". She added that "Jackson brings bliss back to a subject that too many dirty-mouthed hotties have made tedious through overexposure." For Alexis Petridis of The Guardian, Damita Jo was "not only inventive, but brilliantly constructed", with nagging hooks and "explosive" choruses. He also stated that its "strike rate is remarkably high. It's triumphant stuff".

Robert Christgau of The Village Voice noted that the album "starts off bold", but as the record proceeds, "it gets realer, mostly whispered softcore by the second half even when it's love songs per se. Call me immature, but I figure there's never enough good sex in the world". He considered Damita Jo as "good sex" in a culture "inundated with dirty pornos". Neil Strauss of Rolling Stone wrote that Damita Jo "smacks of trying too hard", as it "wants to be all things to all pop fans". He also observed that "if reduced to a quarter of its size (it's twenty-two tracks long), Damita Jo could be a great CD". Similarly, Ian Wade of BBC Music felt that "at 22 tracks over 65 minutes, your attention does start to wander and you almost forget it's playing", suggesting that "a bit of editing and a couple of killer dance tracks would've made it even better." Sal Cinquemani of Slant Magazine said it featured "a slew of the gooey, structureless sex ballads that have become Janet's staple", and although Jackson recruited new producers, "she doesn't really create a new sound for herself here". Cinquemani called the songs "Like You Don't Love Me" and "Moist", produced by Jam and Lewis, "two of the album's best".

For Angus Batey from Yahoo! Music UK, although praising several tracks, the album was "just the next record in a smutty line stretching back a decade", as "Janet has been talking dirty for years". Entertainment Weekly's David Browne echoed those sentiments, observing that thematically, Damita Jo was "essentially the same record she's been making since 1993's 'janet.', her first overtly carnal work", and that "this time, Jackson's stab at a sexy album also lacks a certain va-va-vroom", and that while occasionally some tracks "stay with you", others "evaporate as you listen to them". For Stephen Thomas Erlewine of AllMusic, Jackson "disappears into the productions" on the album, "becoming part of the arrangement instead of standing in front of it", considering the singer's "sexual obsession" as "tired" and "embarrassing" by this point. The Globe and Mail's Robert Everett-Green panned Damita Jo for its excessive sexual content, although he complimented "Just a Little While" and "I Want You"; he also pointed out that, "other good tracks seem to have been constructed with the perverse aim of pushing the star's erotic disembodiment to the limit".

== Accolades ==
In its year-end review of albums released in 2004, Blender ranked Damita Jo at number 50, noting: "From 2004's most notorious flasher, mature, sexy R&B; that is hotter than a Super Bowl halftime show". At the 47th Annual Grammy Awards, the album was nominated for Best Contemporary R&B Album, while "I Want You" received a nomination for Best Female R&B Vocal Performance. In addition, "All Nite (Don't Stop)" was recognized as the "Best Pop Song" at the 2005 BMI London Awards. Retrospectively, Damita Jo was considered one of the 120 Essential Pop Albums by The Daily Telegraph, with journalist Ben Thompson writing: "Listening to Michael's sister's luscious lost 2004 classic is like dining on a seven-course meal comprised entirely of melted marshmallows".

== Commercial performance ==
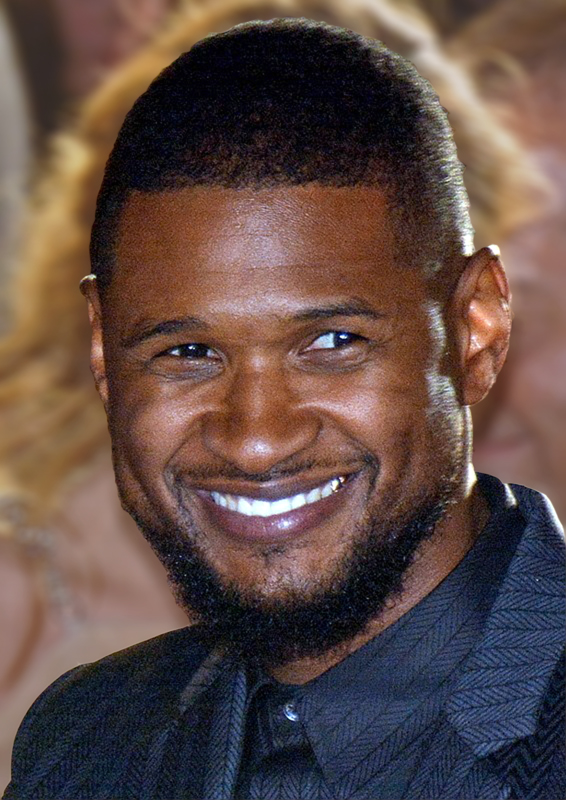
Damita Jo debuted at number two on the US Billboard 200 behind Usher's (pictured) Confessions.

In the United States, Damita Jo was predicted to sell around 200,000 copies within its first week of release, while others believed it would outsell predecessor All for You, which was certified double-platinum. Damita Jo sold 381,000 copies during its first week, debuting at number two on Billboard 200 behind Usher's Confessions. It became Jackson's first album not to reach number one in the US since Dream Street (1984); however, the album garnered Jackson's second-best sales week of her career since Nielsen SoundScan began tracking sales in 1991. The record dropped to number three on the next week, selling 147,000 copies, representing a drop of 67% in sales. It remained inside the chart for 19 weeks. As of March 2009, Damita Jo has sold 1,002,000 copies in the United States. It received a platinum certification from the Recording Industry Association of America (RIAA) within two months of release, on May 27, 2004.

In Canada, Damita Jo debuted at number seven with sales of 9,100 units, and at number ten in Japan with 27,510 copies sold. It was certified platinum by Music Canada (MC) and gold by the Recording Industry Association of Japan (RIAJ) for sales of 100,000 copies in each country. The album also reached number 32 on the UK Albums Chart and was certified silver by the British Phonographic Industry (BPI) on April 2, 2004, denoting shipments in excess of 60,000 copies. It became Jackson's ninth best-selling album in the United Kingdom. It was certified gold by the Recording Industry Association Singapore (RIAS) in June 2004 and also peaked within the top 20 of Australia. Damita Jo also had similar success on the pancontinental European Top 100 Albums chart, reaching number 20.

According to different sources, Damita Jo has sold 2.4 million or even 3 million copies worldwide, which was considered a "disappointment" in the media compared to Jackson's previous efforts. Doug Rule from Metro Weekly likened the album's performance to Madonna's American Life, saying after Madonna released the "biggest flop of her career", it was doubtful Jackson planned her Super Bowl performance to be "quite the reveal it was. She also didn't count on the backlash, a backlash that has actually caused her the same fate as Madonna: public apathy to her music." LA Weekly's Ernest Hardy observed its first-week sales to be "far stronger than those of recent releases by Madonna, Britney, Whitney or J-Lo". while Edna Gundersen of USA Today also said it "outpaced recent debuts by Madonna, Jennifer Lopez and Christina Aguilera". Kelefa Sanneh from The New York Times noted that the record was "even sleeker and sexier than its predecessor, All for You, and in saner times, that would be enough to ensure its success". Regarding the album's commercial performance, Jackson stated, "Of course everyone wants to sell records and be number one. And I think that's important. But for a lot of artists today, it's all about the money as opposed to the art. What happened to artists creating this wonderful body of music that touches people and changes their lives?".

== Commercial blacklist ==
Following the incident at the Super Bowl halftime show performance, conglomerates involved with the broadcast were heavily fined by the FCC and taken to court for several years in proceedings that reached the Supreme Court. In retaliation, the aforementioned conglomerates—Viacom (including CBS; MTV, the halftime show's producer; and radio station group Infinity Broadcasting) and Clear Channel Communications— enforced a blacklist of Jackson's singles and music videos on many radio formats and music channels, as CBS's chairman Les Moonves deemed Jackson's apology as "insufficient". The boycott was placed into effect prior to the release of Damita Jo, affecting her subsequent albums, and ended with the release of Discipline (2008). Timberlake, who performed with Jackson during the incident, did not receive the same treatment. A senior executive for Viacom stated that MTV was "absolutely bailing" on Damita Jo as "the high-ups are still pissed" at her, calling it a punitive measure". Rolling Stone's Daniel Kreps disclosed that the boycott was a result of CBS and Viacom being reportedly angered that the performance had caused their ban from producing future halftime shows, and that "thanks to the radio and music television blacklist, the LP underperforms compared to Janet's previous releases".

"MTV's 'Spanking New' videos in heavy rotation include a gyrating, cleavage-baring Beyoncé [in 'Naughty Girl'] and a bleeped-out Eminem with his group D12 ['My Band']. Yet the sedate new video from Janet Jackson—a fixture on the cable channel for almost two decades and its first 'MTV Icon'—has been absent from its playlist. Meanwhile, Jackson's name had barely been mentioned on MTV—unusual for a superstar whose previous projects have typically gotten heavy promotion".

— Associated Press reporter Jesse Washington about the absence of Jackson's videos on MTV.

Although lead single "Just a Little While" was initially predicted by journalists to be successful, its performance shifted when the blacklist was commenced, virtually disappearing from airplay "without much fanfare" less than two months after its release. The boycott drew attention from critics when providing commentary on the album. Langston Wertz Jr. of The Charlotte Observer commented that the incident made Jackson one of "the most villified [sic] female artists of all time" in the media, and as a result, "radio wouldn't play it and MTV wouldn't play her videos for 'I Want You' and 'All Nite', two songs that would've been out-of-the-park hits at any other point in Jackson's career". Allan Raible of ABC News expressed that "had the Super Bowl incident not happened, I have a feeling the rock-edged 'Just a Little While' and the Kanye West assisted 'Strawberry Bounce' would have been enough to make the album more of a success". Additionally, Doug Rule of the Metro Weekly pointed out that "the best tracks on Damita Jo are likely to be barred from commercial airtime" due to the blacklist, adding "in the case of first single 'Just A Little While,' never really [got] past go" as a reflection of the blacklist.

Music channels owned by Viacom, including MTV and VH1, refused to air Jackson's videos or only aired them in minor rotation following the incident; it was classified as "a major catalyst" in the album's performance. Commenting on Jackson's absence on MTV after the Super Bowl performance, Jam said, "You can probably read between the lines with MTV. I would guess that if MTV wanted to play it, they would, but this is just speculation on my part. It certainly could raise a few questions if you have an investigative mind". Roger Friedman of Fox News ridiculed the decision, claiming Jackson was "being scapegoated for her Super Bowl 'wardrobe malfunction'" and adding: "Imagine that MTV, where illiteracy and lewdness thrive most of the day, would banish Janet's new video because of her 'reputation'. Who are they trying to kid? Of course, MTV is a corporate cousin of CBS, where the original snafu happened. But that's just a coincidence!"

== Influence ==
Several critics observed that the theme of Damita Jo has influenced artists when using similar concepts of alternate identities within album campaigns, regarding Jackson as the trendsetter in which singers "declare themselves in possession of multiple personalities". Britney Spears' Britney Jean (2013) was observed to be titled with influence from Damita Jo; ABC News Radio stated, "taking a page from Janet Jackson's 2004 album, Damita Jo, Britney Spears has combined her first and middle names – Britney Jean – to come up with the title for her much-anticipated eighth studio album". Spears stated that an alternate persona Britney Jean lives inside her, in a similar means to Jackson expressing that Damita Jo was one of the characters that lives inside of her. She also appeared topless on its cover. Several critics observed Beyoncé's persona Sasha Fierce and her album I Am... Sasha Fierce (2008) to be influenced by Damita Jo. The Sydney Morning Herald's Bernard Zuel pointed out that similarly to Jackson's concept, Beyoncé had a persona who "takes over when it's time for me to work and when I'm on stage, this alter ego that I've created kind of protects me and who I really am". Eric R. Danton of the Hartford Courant commented, "her musical forebear Janet Jackson is occasionally known as Damita Jo, so why shouldn't Beyoncé have an alter-ego, too?".

== Track listing ==
Damita Jo – Standard edition
No.	Title	Writer(s)	Producer(s)	Length
1.	"Looking for Love"	Janet Jackson; David Ritz; Fabrice Dumont; Christophe Hetier; Stephan Haeri	Jimmy Jam and Terry Lewis; J. Jackson; Télépopmusik	1:29
2.	"Damita Jo"	J. Jackson; James Harris III & Terry Lewis; Bobby Ross Avila; Issiah J. Avila	Jimmy Jam & Terry Lewis; J. Jackson; B. R. Avila^{[a]}; Iz^{[a]}	2:46
3.	"Sexhibition^{[b]}"	J. Jackson; Dallas Austin; Gregory "Ruckus" Andrews	Austin	2:29
4.	"Strawberry Bounce"	J. Jackson; Kanye West; Harris; Lewis; Tony "Prof T" Tolbert; Shawn Carter; Irving Lorenzo; Jeffrey Atkins; Robin Mays	West; Jimmy Jam & Terry Lewis; J. Jackson	3:11
5.	"My Baby" (featuring Kanye West)	West; Sean Garrett; J. Jackson; Joni-Ayanna Portee	West; Jimmy Jam & Terry Lewis; J. Jackson	4:17
6.	"The Islands"	J. Jackson; Harris; Lewis	Jimmy Jam & Terry Lewis; J. Jackson	0:39
7.	"Spending Time with You"	J. Jackson; Harris; Lewis; B. R. Avila; I. J. Avila	Jimmy Jam & Terry Lewis; J. Jackson; B. R. Avila^{[a]}; Iz^{[a]}	4:14
8.	"Magic Hour"	J. Jackson; Harris; Lewis	Jimmy Jam & Terry Lewis; J. Jackson	0:23
9.	"Island Life"	J. Jackson; Scott Storch; Cathy Dennis	Storch; Jimmy Jam & Terry Lewis; J. Jackson	3:53
10.	"All Nite (Don't Stop)"	J. Jackson; Harris; Lewis; Tolbert; Anders Bagge; Arnthor Birgisson; Herbie Hancock; Paul Jackson; Melvin M. Ragin	Bag & Arnthor; J. Jackson	3:26
11.	"R&B Junkie"	J. Jackson; Harris; Lewis; Tolbert; Michael Jones; Nicholas Trevisick	Jimmy Jam & Terry Lewis; J. Jackson	3:11
12.	"I Want You"	Harold Lilly; West; Burt Bacharach; Hal David; John Stephens	West; Jimmy Jam & Terry Lewis; J. Jackson	3:57
13.	"Like You Don't Love Me"	J. Jackson; Harris; Lewis; B. R. Avila; I. J. Avila	Jimmy Jam & Terry Lewis; J. Jackson; B. R. Avila^{[a]}; Iz^{[a]}	3:31
14.	"Thinkin' Bout My Ex"	Tanya White; Babyface; Andy Cramer	Babyface	4:36
15.	"Warmth^{[b]}"	J. Jackson; Harris; Lewis; Dana Stinson; Tolbert	Rockwilder; Jimmy Jam & Terry Lewis; J. Jackson	3:44
16.	"Moist^{[b]}"	J. Jackson; Harris; Lewis; B. R. Avila; I. J. Avila; Tolbert	Jimmy Jam & Terry Lewis; J. Jackson; B. R. Avila^{[a]}; Iz^{[a]}	4:54
17.	"It All Comes Down to Love"	J. Jackson; Harris; Lewis	Jimmy Jam and Terry Lewis; J. Jackson	0:39
18.	"Truly"	J. Jackson; Harris; Lewis	Jimmy Jam and Terry Lewis; J. Jackson	3:59
19.	"The One"	J. Jackson; Ritz; Harris; Lewis	Jimmy Jam and Terry Lewis; J. Jackson	1:02
20.	"SloLove"	J. Jackson; Shelly Poole; Tommy Danvers; Bagge; Birgisson	Bag & Arnthor; J. Jackson	3:44
21.	"Country"	J. Jackson; Harris; Lewis	Jimmy Jam and Terry Lewis; J. Jackson	0:31
22.	"Just a Little While"	J. Jackson; Austin	Austin	4:11
Total length:				65:02

Damita Jo – Japanese edition (bonus tracks)
No.	Title	Writer(s)	Producer(s)	Length
23.	"I'm Here"	J. Jackson; Bagge; Birgisson; Dennis	Bag & Arnthor; J. Jackson	4:16
24.	"Put Your Hands On"	J. Jackson; Karen Poole; Bagge; Birgisson; Edward Fletcher; Sylvia Robinson; Melvin Glover; Clifton Chase	Bag & Arnthor; J. Jackson	3:56
Total length:				73:14

Notes

- ^{^a} signifies a co-producer
- ^{^b} On clean versions of the album, "Warmth" and "Moist" are not included due to explicit content and "Sexhibition" is re-titled as "Exhibition".

Sample credits

- "Strawberry Bounce" contains elements from "Can I Get A..." by Jay-Z featuring Amil and Ja Rule.
- "All Nite (Don't Stop)" contains elements from "Hang Up Your Hang Ups" by Herbie Hancock.
- "R&B Junkie" contains elements from "I'm in Love" by Evelyn King.
- "I Want You" contains elements of "Close to You" by B.T. Express.
- "Put Your Hands On" contains replayed elements from "The Message" written by Edward Fletcher, Sylvia Robinson, Melvin Glover and Clifton Chase.

== Personnel ==
Personnel adapted from the liner notes of Damita Jo.

- Janet Jackson – vocals, backing vocals, producer
- Dallas Austin – beats, keyboards, Line 6 guitar, producer
- Bobby Ross Avila – bass, drums, co-producer, guitar, keyboards, Moog lead, nylon guitar, producer, Rhodes electric piano
- Babyface – instrumentation, producer
- BAG & Arnthor – arrangers, engineers, producers, programming
- Miri Ben-Ari – violin, violin arranger, violin producer
- Paul Boutin – engineer
- Billy Brown – backing vocals
- Henrik Brunberg – assistant engineer
- Jason Carson – engineer
- Fran Cooper – make-up
- Ian Cross – engineer
- Roger Davies – management
- Kevin "KD" Davis – mixing
- Freckles – backing vocals
- Brian "Big Bass" Gardner – mastering
- Jon Gass – mixing
- Serban Ghenea – mix assistant
- Johnny Gill – guitar
- Lee Groves – programming
- Cesar Guevara – assistant engineer
- Stephan Haeri – mixing
- Rob Haggett – assistant programming
- Doug Harms – assistant engineer
- Terri Harris – personal assistant
- Jeri Heiden – art direction, design
- Steve Hodge – engineer, mixing, mix engineer
- Keenan "Kee Note" Holloway – bass
- Kameron Houff – engineer
- Kevin Hunter – guitar
- Jun Ishizeki – engineer
- Iz – bass, co-producer, drums, electric guitar, guitar, horn stabs, Moog synthesizer, percussion, scratches
- Jimmy Jam – drum programming, drums, keyboards, percussion, producer
- Glenn Jeffery – guitar
- Henrik Jonback – guitar
- Goran Kajfes – horn
- Brent Kolatalo – assistant engineer
- Ken Lewis – instrumentation
- Terry Lewis – producer
- Wayne Scot Lukas – wardrobe
- Matt Marrin – mix engineer
- Manny Marroquin – mixing
- Andrew MacPherson – photography
- Glen Nakasako – art direction, design
- Big Jon Platt – A&R
- Ervin Pope – keyboards
- Joni-Ayanna Portee – backing vocals
- Magnum Coltrane Price – bass
- Tony Reyes – backing vocals, bass, Line 6 guitar
- Tim Roberts – mixing assistant
- Lindsay Scott – management
- Rick Sheppard – engineer, MIDI, sound design
- Xavier Smith – assistant engineer
- Mark "Spike" Stent – mixing
- Scott Storch – producer
- Télépopmusik – producers
- Tony "Prof T" Tolbert – backing vocals
- David Treahearn – mixing assistant
- Rabeka Tuinei – mixing assistant
- Max Vadukul – photography
- Kanye West – vocals, producer
- Colin Wolfe – bass
- Ghian Wright – assistant engineer, mixing assistant
- Bradley Yost – assistant engineer
- Janet Zeitoun – hair stylist, stylist

== Charts ==
=== Weekly charts ===
Chart (2004)	Peak position
Australian Albums (ARIA)	18
Austrian Albums (Ö3 Austria)	49
Belgian Albums (Ultratop Flanders)	33
Belgian Albums (Ultratop Wallonia)	40
Canadian Albums (Billboard)	7
Canadian R&B Albums (Nielsen SoundScan)	2
Danish Albums (Hitlisten)	34
European Top 100 Albums (Billboard)	20
Dutch Albums (Album Top 100)	23
French Albums (SNEP)	35
German Albums (Offizielle Top 100)	21
Irish Albums (IRMA)	72
Italian Albums (FIMI)	37
Japanese Albums (Oricon)	10
New Zealand Albums (RMNZ)	50
Scottish Albums (Official Charts)	42
Swedish Albums (Sverigetopplistan)	43
Swiss Albums (Schweizer Hitparade)	34
UK Albums (Official Charts)	32
UK R&B Albums (Official Charts)	13
US Billboard 200	2
US Top R&B/Hip-Hop Albums (Billboard)	2

=== Monthly charts ===
Chart (2004)	Peak position
South Korean Albums (RIAK)	7

=== Year-end charts ===
Chart (2004)	Position
US Billboard 200	73
US Top R&B/Hip-Hop Albums (Billboard)	20

== Certifications and sales ==
Region	Certification	Certified units/sales
Canada (Music Canada)	Platinum	100,000^{^}
Japan (RIAJ)	Gold	100,000^{^}
Singapore (RIAS)	Gold	7,500
United Kingdom (BPI)	Silver	60,000^{^}
United States (RIAA)	Platinum	1,002,000
Summaries
Worldwide	—	3,000,000
^{^} Shipments figures based on certification alone.

== Release history ==
Region	Date	Edition(s)	Format(s)	Label(s)	Ref.
Japan	March 22, 2004	Standard; clean	CD; digital download; LP	EMI Music Japan	
Austria	March 29, 2004	Standard; clean	CD; digital download; LP	EMI Music Austria	
Germany	March 29, 2004	Standard; clean	CD; digital download; LP	EMI Music Germany	
United Kingdom	March 29, 2004	Standard; clean	CD; digital download; LP	Virgin	
Australia	March 29, 2004	Standard; clean	CD; digital download; LP	EMI Music Australia	
United States	March 30, 2004	Standard; clean	CD; digital download; LP	Virgin	
