= Janet Jackson: Metamorphosis =

2019 concert residency by Janet Jackson

Metamorphosis
- Residency by Janet Jackson
- Promotional poster for the residency
- Location: Paradise, Nevada, U.S.
- Venue: Park Theater
- Start date: May 17, 2019
- End date: August 17, 2019
- Legs: 2
- No. of shows: 18
- Attendance: 76,813
- Box office: $12,999,856

Janet Jackson concert chronology
- State of the World Tour (2017–19); Janet Jackson: Metamorphosis (2019); A Special 30th Anniversary Celebration of Rhythm Nation (2019)

Metamorphosis was a concert residency by American singer Janet Jackson at Park Theater located in the Park MGM hotel and casino on the Las Vegas Strip in Paradise, Nevada. It began on May 17, 2019, and concluded on August 17, 2019. The show featured songs from Jackson's music catalog, and also celebrated the thirty-year anniversary of Janet Jackson's Rhythm Nation 1814 (1989). The concert was produced by Live Nation Entertainment.

Jackson earned $12.9 million within 18 dates, making the residency one of the most lucrative to emerge from Vegas' live music performances to date. Metamorphosis positions Jackson in the middle of a career upswing, averaging and outpacing other Vegas acts in sales, grossing an average of $722,000 with 4,000 tickets per night. She also scored the 5th highest average gross in a Las Vegas Residency opening run by a female artist.

== Set list ==
This set list is representative of the show on May 17, 2019. It may not represent all concerts for the duration of the residency.

1. "Intro"
2. "Empty"
3. "Feedback"
4. "Trust a Try" / "If" / "You"
5. "20 Part 2" (Interlude)
6. "What Have You Done for Me Lately"
7. "Control" / "Nasty" / "The Pleasure Principle"
8. "When I Think of You" / "R&B Junkie" / "The Best Things in Life Are Free"
9. "Are You" (Short film)
10. "That's the Way Love Goes" / "Got 'til It's Gone"
11. "Come Back to Me" / "Funny How Time Flies (When You're Having Fun)" / "Let's Wait Awhile"
12. "China Love"
13. "Together Again" / "All for You"
14. "Ruff" (Short film)
15. "I Get Lonely" / "Moist"
16. "Any Time, Any Place"
17. "DJ Set"
18. "Go Deep" (Timbaland remix) / "Come On Get Up" / "Rock with U" / "Throb"
19. "All Nite (Don't Stop)" (Contains elements from "Burnitup!")
20. Short Film (Contains elements from "This Body", "Nasty", and "Burnitup!")
21. "T.V." (interlude)
22. "State of the World" / "The Knowledge"
23. "Let's Dance" (interlude)
24. "Miss You Much" / "Love Will Never Do (Without You)" / "Alright" / "Escapade" / "Black Cat"
25. "Pledge" (interlude)
26. "Rhythm Nation"
27. "Morning" (interlude)
28. "Doesn't Really Matter"
29. "So Excited"
30. "Made for Now"

== Shows ==
List of concerts
Date	City	Country	Venue	Attendance	Gross
May 17, 2019	Las Vegas	United States	Park Theater	24,938 / 31,052 (80%)	$4,140,636
May 18, 2019	Las Vegas	United States	Park Theater	24,938 / 31,052 (80%)	$4,140,636
May 21, 2019	Las Vegas	United States	Park Theater	24,938 / 31,052 (80%)	$4,140,636
May 22, 2019	Las Vegas	United States	Park Theater	24,938 / 31,052 (80%)	$4,140,636
May 25, 2019	Las Vegas	United States	Park Theater	24,938 / 31,052 (80%)	$4,140,636
May 26, 2019	Las Vegas	United States	Park Theater	24,938 / 31,052 (80%)	$4,140,636
July 24, 2019	Las Vegas	United States	Park Theater	51,875 / 62,398 (83%)	$8,859,220
July 26, 2019	Las Vegas	United States	Park Theater	51,875 / 62,398 (83%)	$8,859,220
July 27, 2019	Las Vegas	United States	Park Theater	51,875 / 62,398 (83%)	$8,859,220
July 31, 2019	Las Vegas	United States	Park Theater	51,875 / 62,398 (83%)	$8,859,220
August 2, 2019	Las Vegas	United States	Park Theater	51,875 / 62,398 (83%)	$8,859,220
August 3, 2019	Las Vegas	United States	Park Theater	51,875 / 62,398 (83%)	$8,859,220
August 7, 2019	Las Vegas	United States	Park Theater	51,875 / 62,398 (83%)	$8,859,220
August 9, 2019	Las Vegas	United States	Park Theater	51,875 / 62,398 (83%)	$8,859,220
August 10, 2019	Las Vegas	United States	Park Theater	51,875 / 62,398 (83%)	$8,859,220
August 14, 2019	Las Vegas	United States	Park Theater	51,875 / 62,398 (83%)	$8,859,220
August 16, 2019	Las Vegas	United States	Park Theater	51,875 / 62,398 (83%)	$8,859,220
August 17, 2019	Las Vegas	United States	Park Theater	51,875 / 62,398 (83%)	$8,859,220
Total				76,813 / 93,450 (82%)	$12,999,856
