= R&B Junkie =

Song by Janet Jackson

from the album Damita Jo
- Released: December 30, 2004
- Recorded: 2003
- Studio: Flyte Tyme Studios West at The Village (Los Angeles, California)
- Genre: Post-disco; funk; R&B
- Length: 3:10
- Label: Virgin
- Songwriters: Janet Jackson; James Harris III; Terry Lewis; Tony "Prof T" Tolbert; Michael Jones; Nicholas Trevisick
- Producers: Janet Jackson; Jimmy Jam and Terry Lewis

"R&B Junkie" is a song by American singer-songwriter Janet Jackson from her eighth studio album, Damita Jo (2004). Written by Jackson, James Harris III, Terry Lewis, Tony "Prof T" Tolbert, Michael Jones and Nicholas Trevisick, the track was released as a promotional single in 2004 by Virgin Records. "R&B Junkie" is an upbeat song which has a "retro" feel consisting of 1980s soul, R&B, funk, dance-pop and synths, while it samples Evelyn King's 1981 song "I'm in Love"; it has "oh-oh-ohs" throughout the verses.

"R&B Junkie" received positive reviews from music critics, who deemed it as one of the best songs from the album. The song peaked at number one on the Bubbling Under R&B/Hip-Hop Singles, as it received a limited release. "R&B Junkie" was performed by Jackson during the 2004 BET Awards, as well on the Las Vegas residency Metamorphosis and the A Special 30th Anniversary Celebration of Rhythm Nation tour in 2019.

== Recording and composition ==
"R&B Junkie" was recorded in 2003, at Flyte Tyme Studios West at The Village, in Los Angeles, California. It was written by Janet Jackson, James Harris III, Terry Lewis, Tony "Prof T" Tolbert, Michael Jones and Nicholas Trevisick, while it was produced by Jackson, Jam and Lewis. The latter one also played the keyboards. The song had its drums and percussion played by Iz. Serban Ghenea did the mixing of "R&B Junkie" at MixStar Studios, Virginia Beach, with Tim Roberts being his assistant. Ian Cross engineered the song while Ghian Wright was an assistant. Additionally, the Pro-Tools engineer was John Hanes. "R&B Junkie" was mastered by Brian "Big Bass" Gardner at Bernie Grundman Mastering in Hollywood, along with all tracks present on Damita Jo.

"R&B Junkie" is an upbeat song which has a "retro" feel consisting of 1980s funk, dance-pop, and synths. It transforms a brief sample from Evelyn King's 1981 song "I'm in Love" into a new composition. According to LA Weekly, it worked in the context of a song that is an "ode to old-school soul music and the dances those sounds inspired". "R&B Junkie"'s positive vibe was described as a sonic "ambrosia" by Baltimore City Paper. Additionally, the song has "oh-oh-ohs" throughout the verses and on the chorus. According to Pitchfork's Rich Juzwiak, the track "doesn’t have very much to say" lyrically, describing it as "a hazy salute to old school R&B in which Jackson references dances like the wop, the cabbage patch, the electric slide, Vaughan Mason & Crew's 'Bounce, Rock, Skate, Roll'…and not much else."

== Critical reception ==
"R&B Junkie" received positive reviews from music critics. Angus Batey from Yahoo! Music described "R&B Junkie" as one of the high points from Damita Jo, describing it as a delicious throwback. Ernest Hardy from LA Weekly considered the song as the second best song from Damita Jo, after "Like You Don't Love Me", and predicted it to be a "likely candidate for club hit of the summer". In a similar opinion, for Lisa Verrico of The Times, "R&B Junkie" was an example of "singles are popping up everywhere" on the album. According to Gene Stout from Seattle Post-Intelligencer felt that it was among the catchiest tracks on Damita Jo. BBC Music's Ian Warde asserted that the song "is a nice Evelyn Champagne King infused number that parties like it's 1982". Similarly, Michael Paoletta from Billboard called it a "winner" from Damita Jo and noted that it "fabulously" referenced the sampled song. The Ledger's Bill Dean felt that the track's "high octane dance-grooves" would "burn down the house".

The staff of The Scotsman pointed out that "R&B Junkie" was "an example of the kind of enjoyable retro bandwagon-jumping that bags Kylie a dancefloor hit every now and again", but Jackson was "a more convincing advocate for the old school R&B sound, having likely grown up on the stuff". Rich Juzwiak of Pitchfork called it "terrific", while Mikael Wood from Baltimore City Paper commented that "R&B Junkie" had an enough positive vibe to shame American musician Michael J. Powell into early retirement. New Straits Times's Christie Leo felt that the "lyrical content deficit is easily compensated with a stinging rhythm drive" on "R&B Junkie". The staff of Independent Online wrote that music lovers would "chill to the disco sounds" of the song, as it boasts "catchy dance beats that will leave you shaking your stuff on the dance floor". Spence D. from IGN described it as "ultimately non-descript", despite considering it infectious.

== Live performance ==
Jackson performed a medley of "All Nite (Don't Stop)" and "R&B Junkie" at the 2004 BET Awards. Following Jackson's Super Bowl XXXVIII halftime show controversy, various performances on TV were aired with a time delay per the U.S. Federal Communications Commission's guidelines, but the awards show was televised without a delay. In 2019, Jackson performed the song in concert at her Las Vegas residency Janet Jackson: Metamorphosis, and on the A Special 30th Anniversary Celebration of Rhythm Nation tour.

== Track listing ==
- US promotional CD single
1. "R&B Junkie" – 3:10

== Credits and personnel ==
Credits adapted from the liner notes of Damita Jo.

- Janet Jackson – vocals, production
- James Harris III – production, keyboards
- Terry Lewis – production
- Tony Tolbert – background vocals
- IZ – drums, percussion
- Ian Cross – engineering
- Ghian Wright – engineering assistance
- Serban Ghenea – mixing
- Tim Roberts – mixing assistance
- John Hanes – Pro-Tools engineering

== Charts ==
Chart performance for "R&B Junkie"
Chart (2004)	Peak position
US Adult R&B Songs (Billboard)	17
US Bubbling Under R&B/Hip-Hop Songs (Billboard)	1
