= I Want You (Janet Jackson song) =

Single by Janet Jackson

from the album Damita Jo
- A-side: "All Nite (Don't Stop)"
- B-side: "Put Your Hands On"
- Released: February 22, 2004
- Recorded: October 2003
- Genre: Doo-wop; R&B; hip-hop
- Length: 4:12
- Label: Virgin
- Songwriters: Harold Lilly; Kanye West; Burt Bacharach; Hal David; John Stephens
- Producers: Kanye West; Jimmy Jam & Terry Lewis; Janet Jackson

Janet Jackson singles chronology
"Just a Little While" (2004)	"I Want You" (2004)	"All Nite (Don't Stop)" (2004)

Music video
- "I Want You" on YouTube

"I Want You" is a song recorded by American singer Janet Jackson for her eighth studio album, Damita Jo (2004). It was released on February 22, 2004 as the second single from the album, by Virgin Records. It was written by Harold Lilly, Kanye West, and John Legend, while it was produced by West, Jimmy Jam & Terry Lewis, and Jackson. The mid-tempo ballad consists of a retro sound and arrangement, paying homage to the classic pop sound of the Motown era. Its composition is based on Jackson's passion and desire for an estranged lover. "I Want You" is notable for being among the first singles produced with West and co-written by Legend, who were both upcoming artists at the time.

The song received positive reviews by music critics, who complimented Jackson's vocals and its fusion of nostalgic and modern qualities. The song's performance was largely affected by the blacklisting of Jackson's singles and music videos worldwide due to U.S. Federal Communications Commission fines regarding her controversial Super Bowl Halftime Show incident, with conglomerates such as Viacom and CBS enforcing the boycott. "I Want You" reached the top 20 in airplay prior to stalling due to the blockage, also becoming Jackson's 33rd consecutive top-40 hit on the Hot R&B/Hip-Hop Songs chart. The blacklisting drew controversy amongst critics, who declared the song to likely have been an "across-the-board smash" hit had the incident not occurred.

"I Want You" was certified platinum by the Recording Industry Association of America (RIAA) and received a nomination for Best Female R&B Vocal Performance at the 47th Annual Grammy Awards. The song's music video was directed by Dave Meyers and portrays Jackson traveling through Los Angeles to meet her boyfriend. It did not air on MTV nor several other music channels owned by Viacom and CBS due to their boycott of Jackson following her Super Bowl performance incident. During the promotional campaign for Damita Jo, Jackson performed "I Want You" on various occasions, including on Good Morning America.

== Background ==
"I Want You" was written by Harold Lilly, Kanye West, and John Legend, while production was handled by West, Jimmy Jam & Terry Lewis, and Jackson. It was initially titled "Have Your Way with Me" in its early stages, and was one of two songs from the album which Jackson did not co-write, along with "Thinkin' 'Bout My Ex", written by Kenneth "Babyface" Edmonds. Describing the song, Jackson said, "It's a different kind of song for me, it's more of like a throwback. More of a doowoop-y [feel], which I've never done before which is quite exciting, and I enjoyed recording it in the studio." John Platt, senior Vice President of Virgin Records and EMI Publishing, commented that Damita Jo "is really about positive love and where she's at in her life right now. The second half of the album was very easy once me and Janet got to know each other, and found the songs that really were true to her and that she can sing with conviction. That's why there's so much passion in this "I Want You" record, that's where she's at in her life right now."

West first collaborated with Jackson several months prior to the release of his debut album, The College Dropout (2004). West stated, "I don't want to talk about it before it comes out, but it'll be unbelievable." John Legend, who co-wrote the track, also plays the piano on the track. Legend was an upcoming artist and relatively unknown at the time, having not yet released his debut album Get Lifted or any singles. The song was among Legend's first major credits along with the West-produced Jay-Z single "Encore", West's remix of Britney Spears' "Me Against the Music", and The Black Eyed Peas' "The Boogie that Be." Legend commented, "I'm not going to focus on her breast like the rest of y'all. I'm about the music. Since everyone's paying attention to her, it should bode well for her next single "Have Your Way With Me" which is gonna drop next week. We're just wrapping up the production now. It's produced by Kanye West and co-written by Kanye, Harold Lilly and yours truly. I played some piano on there too. It's a sweet, soulful song. I think it'll be a smash." The song also features contributions from Israeli violinist Miri Ben-Ari. Simon Umlauf of CNN commented Ari's contribution "gently caresses" the song, providing "a dramatic edge you won't find anywhere else."

== Release and composition ==
Due to an early leak, "I Want You" was released for digital download through Virgin Records's website and All Access Music Group on February 22, 2004, though it was not officially sent to radio until March 1, 2004. "Love Me", a newly recorded remix of "Just a Little While" produced by Just Blaze, was initially to be sent to urban radio formats. However, its release was canceled when the original version was removed from airplay due to blacklisting from several conglomerates regarding Jackson's Super Bowl performance incident, prompting the release of "I Want You". The album version concludes with a brief interlude of Jackson speaking of her passion for music, which the radio edit omits. A promotional single including the song's E-Smoove remix, music video, and exclusive interview was released for purchase at Regal Cinemas for a limited time.

"I Want You"
"I Want You" draws influence from the Motown era of classic pop music while maintaining a modern, contemporary feel.

"I Want You" is a pop ballad based on music of the Motown era. It incorporates doo-wop, R&B and hip-hop into its production, providing an "equally keen senses of retroism and hip-hop currency." Its instrumentation consists of guitar, piano, violins, and synthesized drums. It is written in the key of E♭ major with a slow tempo of 72 beats per minute in 12/8 time signature, with Jackson's vocals ranging from G_{3} to C_{5}. It contains a brief sample from B. T. Express' 1976 version of The Carpenters' 1970 song "(They Long to Be) Close to You", written by Burt Bacharach and Hal David. Jackson described the song as having a "throwback" feel, considered a departure from her other works. Michael Paletta of Billboard described its "opening drum downbeat" accompanied by "swirling string crescendos," considered "the perfect backdrop for Jackson's breathy vocals." It was analyzed to have a "chimes-studded texture" and strings backed by drums, also having "a triangle thrown in there for good measure." Its lyrics focus on longing for an estranged lover and feeling emotionally distraught when apart. Jackson pleads for their affection during its chorus, telling them to "Have your way with me." Tareck Ghoneim of Contactmusic.com stated "The lyrics are simple. She just wants her man and she’s telling it straight," while Plugged In (publication) observed it to convey Jackson's "insatiable" desire for intimacy in a "vulnerable and lovesick" manner.

== Critical reception ==
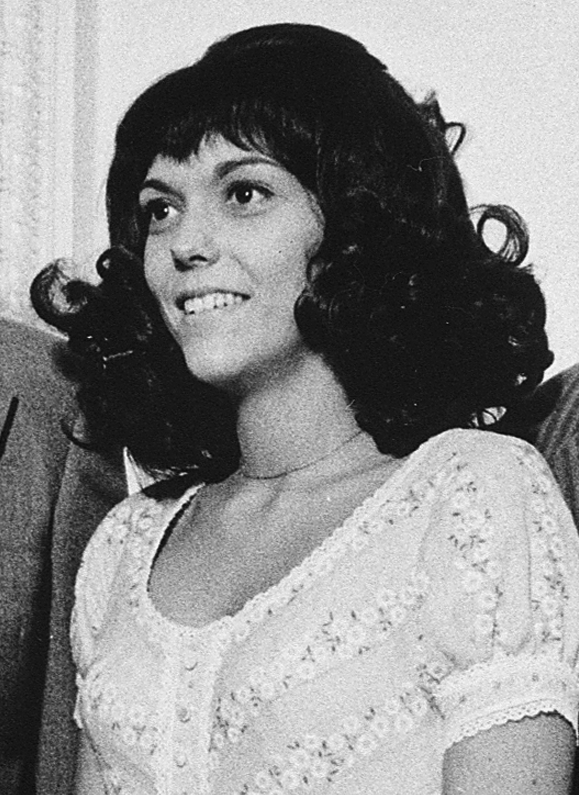
"I Want You" drew comparisons to soft rock recording artist Karen Carpenter (pictured)

"I Want You" received favorable reviews from music critics. Michael Paoletta of Billboard stated, "the retro-vibed song calls to mind the sparkly yet wistful soul of '60s-era girl groups" while maintaining "a contemporary reference". Paoletta considered its aura and "girl-desires-boy theme" to make the track a "crossover gem". He also commented that it would potentially have "multiformat popularity." Ernest Hardy of LA Weekly called it "a retro affair" with a classic "girl-group arrangement", while a critique from Gashaus noted the song "shimmers with some of Janet's former iridescent glow." Alexis Petridis of The Guardian praised its "impossibly lithe basseline", calling it an electronic reconstruction of a 1970s soul ballad, also determined to be "not only inventive, but brilliantly constructed." Colin O'Hare from Hot Press called it an "obligatory ballad" which portrays Jackson's musicality, showcasing her "versatility and mastery of a bewildering array of styles."

Spence D. of IGN praised the single, calling it "'70s retro mode" and a perfect homage to the era of mainstream excess. The review added, "It's squeaky and clean sounding in a sugary, fluff kind of way, almost as if it were a song recorded by Janet years ago and recently rediscovered. And you know what? It's cool because of that." Aaron Foley of MLive considered it Jackson's fourth most underrated single, calling it among "the fruits from that era that don't get the respect they deserve". Foley added, that after Jackson's Super Bowl XXXVIII halftime show controversy, "I Want You" "got lost in the wash. The starry-eyed, Motown-inspired ballad had Janet vulnerable and lovesick, boo hooing for her lover's attention." Jim Abott of Orlando Sentinel classified "the sweetly melodic old-school" song among Jackson's "occasional bursts of inspiration," declaring it was "a beautifully big arrangement that's Motown-esque."

Additionally, its "depth and sweetness" was considered unexpected by Dan LeRoy from The Scene, commenting "West's swaying '50s pastiche "I Want You" is delightful". Richard Cromelin of the Los Angeles Times exclaimed the track "has a swooning charm, with a chimes-studded texture that suggests the sweeping light-points of a disco ball." Mikael Wood of Baltimore City Paper gave a similar critique, saying the "luscious slow jam" ultimately "shimmers with the sweet lovesickness Karen Carpenter had to fight through a scrim of suburban sang-froid to express." Stephen Thomas Erlewine of AllMusic declared the song "on the slower side", containing "a verse that's memorable." Plugged In observed subtle sexuality within its lyrics, commenting that Jackson is insatiable. Music critic Kevin Nottingham ranked it as West's second best production, classifying it as a "gorgeous piece of work", and adding that "the drums hit at the beginning and the listener should already fall in love. Janet's voice should intrigue you, but frankly, those strings and those drums grab my attention all the time".

== Chart performance ==
The song was released exclusively in North America and Europe to urban radio formats. Due to the blacklist, "I Want You" quickly rose to number eighteen in airplay before stalling on the chart. The song generated an audience impression of nearly twenty-two million on formats able to play the song during its first week. The song debuted at number 74 on the Billboard Hot 100 on April 3, 2004, before peaking at number 57 weeks later. It also peaked at number 18 on Hot R&B/Hip-Hop Songs, becoming her thirty-third consecutive top forty hit on the chart. It had also reached number sixteen on Radio and Records's weekly airplay report. Additionally, it also peaked at number four on Billboard's Urban Adult Contemporary airplay chart. Due to strong sales, the song was certified platinum by the Recording Industry Association of America (RIAA).

"All Nite (Don't Stop)" was released as the album's second single in most international markets as a double A-Side with "I Want You", making the song ineligible to chart. However, "I Want You" reached number 19 in the United Kingdom. It also reached number ten on the United Kingdom's BBC Radio 2 airplay chart, while lead single "Just a Little While" spent multiple weeks atop the chart. It received a Grammy nomination for Best Female R&B Vocal Performance at the 47th Annual Grammy Awards.

=== Blacklist ===
"CBS and MTV’s parent company Viacom, angered that an unannounced addition to the Super Bowl performance has now cost them all future halftime shows, hits back at Jackson by essentially blacklisting her, keeping her music videos off their properties MTV, VH1, and radio stations under their umbrella. The blacklist spreads to include non-Viacom media entities as well."

— Rolling Stone's Daniel Kreps.

"I Want You", along with Jackson's other singles from Damita Jo and her following two albums, was blacklisted by many major radio formats following her controversial Super Bowl Halftime Show incident that resulted in several media conglomerates receiving massive U.S. Federal Communications Commission fines in its aftermath, such as Viacom, which owns many radio formats, MTV, and CBS, which broadcast the event and owns Clear Channel Communications. The blacklisting of Jackson drew attention and commentary from music critics, with many claiming the song would likely have achieved greater success if the blockage had not occurred. Glenn Gamboa of Newsweek stated, "Unfortunately, it's not clear whether these songs will get heard," saying after the incident, "Jackson has been put in the pop culture penalty box. The result is that despite some initial backing for "Just a Little While", radio and TV support for her music has withered, as the conglomerates worry about angering the FCC and Congress" in fear of receiving fines for supporting Jackson. Gamboa added that "I Want You" would have been an "across-the-board smash pre-Nipplegate." In retrospect, Rich Juzwiak of Gawker commented that the "lush" single would have been successful for Jackson given a different set of circumstances.

== Promotion ==
=== Music video ===
The music video for "I Want You" was directed by Dave Meyers, who previously directed Jackson's music videos for "All for You" (2001) and "Just a Little While" (2004). Intended to resemble Brooklyn, New York, the video was shot in Los Angeles. It portrays Jackson traveling through the city at night to meet her boyfriend, interacting with the various people she encounters along the way. She commented that the video was simple, and there was not a major production for wardrobe, hair and makeup. Explaining its concept, she stated "I'm coming out of my apartment building and walking down the street, and you see all the goings-on in the neighborhood". The video was desired to have an intimate "community" feel. For this reason, Hollywood casting agents sought a wide variety of extras, ranging from teenage delinquents to mothers picking up her babies and children from day care, and other people commuting by bus to and from work.

Jackson and Dupri sharing a kiss in the music video for "I Want You"

A portion of the video's premise was inspired by Jackson's then-relationship with record producer Jermaine Dupri, which was unconfirmed at the time. The singer said she was not hesitant to feature Dupri in the visual, although revealed it was the director's idea to do so. Meyers explained that he had the idea while filming the video for "Just a Little While", telling Jackson, "If I could get the two of you in a simple video together, it's gonna be gold". He also states that his idea was due to persistent rumors of their relationship circulating in the media, saying, "That's the whole concept here, a real simple video and then the slam dunk is JD's in the video. He hasn't been in any of her stuff and all the rumors of 'are they together, are they not together.'" In the video, Jackson can also be seen wearing a belly button ring with a dangling pendant that reads "JD's."

The video debuted on March 16, 2004, on BET's Access Granted, and was later available for streaming on the network's website. It begins with Jackson leaving her apartment in New York City at night, wearing a pink top, black jacket and jeans, before walking through the city's streets, until she enters a grocery store. Upon leaving the store, she gives coins to a beggar and interacts with two female friends before taking the bus. Jackson then enters a Boys & Girls Club recreation center to visit Dupri, her boyfriend, and the clip ends as they share a kiss. Along with Dupri, actor Bobb'e J. Thompson makes a brief cameo in the video. A scene of Jackson purchasing Trojan condoms was filmed to promote safe sex, but it was omitted from the final result, being replaced by a scene of Jackson shopping for apple juice and a lollipop instead.

Following the Super Bowl incident, Jackson's singles and music videos were blacklisted by various entertainment conglomerates involved with the event who received massive FCC fines, including Viacom, which owns MTV, VH1, and co-produced the event, and CBS, which aired the event and owns Clear Channel Communications. A senior executive for Viacom stated, "MTV is absolutely bailing on the record. The pressure is so great, they can't align with anything related to Janet. The high-ups are still pissed at her, and this is a punitive measure", while Judy McGrath, MTV Networks Group's president responded, "We didn’t pull our support. The video didn't seem to connect with our audience. If there was demand for it, it would be on TRL". In British publication Music Week, Virgin's marketing director Elizabeth Nordy stated that MTV's lack of support due to the Super Bowl incident had been a "major catalyst" in the performance of Jackson's singles. Jam also responded to an MTV statement claiming the network never received Jackson's videos, pointing out that both BET and VH1 received it.

=== Live performances ===
During promotional campaign for Damita Jo, Jackson performed "I Want You" on Good Morning America, On Air with Ryan Seacrest, Much Music, Canada AM, and Spain's Gala Xacobeo. Additionally, the performances from On Air with Ryan Seacrest and Much Music are included on Jackson's From Janet to Damita Jo: The Videos compilation. For the first time in concert, Jackson featured the song on the setlist for her Janet Jackson: Las Vegas show in 2024-2025.

== Track listings ==
"I Want You" was released as a double A-side with "All Nite (Don't Stop)".

- UK CD single
1. "All Nite (Don't Stop)" – 3:26
2. "I Want You" – 3.58
3. "Put Your Hands On" – 3:56
4. "All Nite (Don't Stop)" (Sander Kleinenberg Radio Mix) – 4:14
5. "I Want You" (Ray Roc Radio Mix) – 4:18
6. "All Nite (Don't Stop)" (Video)
7. "I Want You" (Video)
- European CD single
1. "All Nite (Don't Stop)" – 3:26
2. "I Want You" – 4:12
- UK promotional CD single
1. "I Want You" (Radio Edit) – 3:54
2. "I Want You" (Main Version) – 4:01
- Spanish promotional CD single
1. "I Want You" (Radio Edit) – 3:50
- Taiwanese promotional CD single
1. "I Want You" – 4:12
2. "Just a Little While" (UK Mix) – 4:05
- US promotional mini CD single
1. "I Want You" (E-Smoove Remix) – 4:15
2. "I Want You" (Video) – 3:45
- UK promotional CD-R
1. "I Want You" (E-Smoove Remix Main Edit) – 4:16
2. "I Want You" (E-Smoove Remix Main Dub) – 7:10
3. "I Want You" (E-Smoove Remix Main Instrumental) – 7:37
4. "I Want You" (E-Smoove Remix Main Edit) – 4:16
5. "I Want You" (E-Smoove Hard Mix) – 7:42
6. "I Want You" (E-Smoove Remix Hard Dub) – 7:43
7. "I Want You" (E-Smoove Remix Soul Dub) – 7:27
8. "I Want You" (Ray Roc Project Club Mix) – 8:18
9. "I Want You" (Ray Roc Project Deep Mix) – 8:02
10. "I Want You" (Ray Roc Project Dub Mix) – 7:46
11. "I Want You" (Ray Roc Project Radio Mix) – 4:19
12. "I Want You" (Ray Roc Project Radio Instrumental) – 4:18
13. "I Want You" (Radio Edit) – 3:50
14. "I Want You" (Album Version) – 3:59
- Jamaican promotional 7" single
1. "I Want You (More)" (Federation Remix featuring Vybz Kartel) – 3:50
2. "I Want You (More)" (Federation Remix - No Rap)

== Credits and personnel ==
- Janet Jackson – vocals, producer
- Kanye West – songwriter, producer
- James Harris III - producer, keyboards
- Terry Lewis - producer
- John Legend - songwriter
- Harold Lilly - songwriter
- Miri Ben-Ari – violin
- Burt Bacharach – songwriter
- Hal David - songwriter
- Bobby Ross Avila - guitarist
- Keenan Holloway - bassist
- Ervin Pope - keyboards
- Ian Cross - engineer
- Tats Sato - engineer

Credits and personnel adapted from Damita Jo album liner notes.

== Charts ==
=== Weekly charts ===
Chart (2004)	Peak position
Scottish Singles Sales (Official Charts) with "All Nite (Don't Stop)"	23
UK Singles (Official Charts) with "All Nite (Don't Stop)"	19
UK Dance (Official Charts) with "All Nite (Don't Stop)"	5
UK Hip Hop/R&B (Official Charts) with "All Nite (Don't Stop)"	3
US Billboard Hot 100	57
US Hot R&B/Hip-Hop Songs (Billboard)	18

=== Year-end charts ===
Chart (2004)	Position
US Hot R&B/Hip-Hop Songs (Billboard)	90

== Certifications ==
Region	Certification	Certified units/sales
United States (RIAA)	Platinum	1,000,000^{^}
^{^} Shipments figures based on certification alone.

== Release history ==
Release dates and formats for "I Want You"
Region	Date	Format(s)	Label(s)	Ref.
United States	February 22, 2004	Digital download	Virgin	
United States	March 1, 2004	Urban contemporary radio; urban adult contemporary radio	Virgin	
