= Janet Jackson: A Special 30th Anniversary Celebration of Rhythm Nation =

2019 concert tour by Janet Jackson

A Special 30th Anniversary Celebration of Rhythm Nation
- Anniversary tour by Janet Jackson
- Promotional poster for the tour
- Location: Australia; New Zealand; North America
- Start date: September 14, 2019
- End date: November 23, 2019
- Legs: 2
- No. of shows: 11

Janet Jackson concert chronology
- Janet Jackson: Metamorphosis (2019); A Special 30th Anniversary Celebration of Rhythm Nation (2019); Janet Jackson: Together Again (2023–2024)

A Special 30th Anniversary Celebration of Rhythm Nation was a concert tour by American recording artist Janet Jackson. The tour commemorates the 30th anniversary of the release of her fourth studio album, Janet Jackson's Rhythm Nation 1814 (1989). It followed the success of Jackson's residency show. The spot dates in the United States were followed by headlining at RNB Fridays Live (Australia) and Friday Jams Live (New Zealand).

== Critical reception ==
Jon Bream of the Star Tribune stated Jackson still shined without all the glitz. He says, "Jackson unleashed irresistible club bangers, found nasty rhythms and grooves, cooed cuddly ballads, delivered pop favorites and unearthed enough deep tracks to reward the hard-core fans, something that was missing on the 2011 tour."

John Berger (Honolulu Star-Advertiser) stated Jackson's shows in Hawaii were "worth the wait". He went on to say: "[...] Jackson's star power — and a singer, as a dancer, as an entertainer — was as bright as ever Wednesday in the Arena."

== Set list ==
The following set list was obtained from the concert held on September 14, 2019, held at the Treasure Island Amphitheater in Welch, Minnesota. It does not represent all concerts for the duration of the tour.

1. "Video Sequence"
2. "All Nite (Don't Stop)"
3. "If"
4. "You"
5. "What Have You Done for Me Lately"
6. "Control"
7. "Nasty"
8. "The Pleasure Principle"
9. "When I Think of You"
10. "R&B Junkie"
11. "The Best Things in Life Are Free"
12. "That's the Way Love Goes"
13. "Got 'til It's Gone"
14. "Again"
15. "Come Back to Me"
16. "Any Time, Any Place"
17. "Let's Wait Awhile"
18. "No Sleeep"
19. "Together Again"
20. "Someone to Call My Lover"
21. "Come On Get Up"
22. "Rock with U"
23. "Throb"
24. "Feedback"
25. "Video Sequence" (contains elements of "Funky Big Band", "So Much Betta" and "Interlude: T.V.")
26. "State of the World"
27. "The Knowledge"
28. "Instrumental Sequence" (contains elements of "Interlude: Let's Dance")
29. "Miss You Much"
30. "Love Will Never Do (Without You)"
31. "Alright"
32. "Escapade"
33. "Black Cat"
34. "Video Sequence" (contains elements of "Interlude: Pledge")
35. "Rhythm Nation"

Encore

36. "All for You"
37. "Made for Now"

== Tour dates ==
List of 2019 concerts
Date	City	Country	Venue
September 14, 2019^{[A]}	Welch	United States	Treasure Island Amphitheater
September 21, 2019	San Francisco	United States	Chase Center
November 8, 2019^{[B]}	Perth	Australia	HBF Park
November 9, 2019^{[B]}	Melbourne	Australia	Marvel Stadium
November 10, 2019^{[B]}	Adelaide	Australia	Adelaide Showground
November 15, 2019^{[B]}	Brisbane	Australia	Brisbane Showgrounds
November 16, 2019^{[B]}	Sydney	Australia	Giants Stadium
November 17, 2019^{[C]}	Auckland	New Zealand	Western Springs Stadium
November 20, 2019	Honolulu	United States	Blaisdell Arena
November 21, 2019	Honolulu	United States	Blaisdell Arena
November 23, 2019	Honolulu	United States	Blaisdell Arena

Festivals and other miscellaneous performances
^{A} This concert was a part of the "2019 Summer Concert Series"
^{B} This concert was a part of "RNB Fridays Live"
^{C} This concert was a part of "Friday Jams Live"

=== Box office score data ===
Venue	City	Tickets sold / Available	Gross revenue
Chase Center	San Francisco	13,255 / 13,255 (100%)	$1,592,828
