= Just a Little While =

2004 single by Janet Jackson

Single by Janet Jackson

from the album Damita Jo
- Released: February 2, 2004
- Studio: DARP (Atlanta, Georgia)
- Genre: Pop rock; dance; new wave
- Length: 4:13
- Label: Virgin
- Songwriters: Janet Jackson; Dallas Austin
- Producer: Dallas Austin

Janet Jackson singles chronology
| "Feel It Boy" (2002) | "Just a Little While" (2004) | "I Want You" (2004) |

Music video
- "Just a Little While" on YouTube

"Just a Little While" is a song by American singer-songwriter Janet Jackson, from her eighth studio album, Damita Jo (2004). Written by Jackson and Dallas Austin and produced by the latter, the track is a reflection of Jackson's new-found happiness during the album's recording. It was released to radio stations as the lead single from Damita Jo in the United States on February 2, 2004, by Virgin Records, following a leak ahead of its scheduled release which caused Jackson's record company to rush with a music video and promotion. "Just a Little While" is a pop rock, dance, and new wave song which lyrically showcases Jackson's "signature fashion" of writing sexual lyrics which are "innocent on the surface", expressing the singer's desire to have sexual intercourse with a lover.

"Just a Little While" received mixed reviews from music critics; some of them were enthusiastic towards the track and compared its composition to works by Prince. However, others thought it was not good enough and questioned its position as the album's closing song. In the United States, the song's commercial performance was affected by Jackson's Super Bowl XXXVIII halftime show controversy; despite being the most added and played song on radio following its release, Jackson's works were blacklisted on many radio formats and music channels; "Just a Little While" ultimately peaked at number 45 on the Billboard Hot 100. Internationally, it was more successful, reaching the top 10 in Canada and Spain and the top 20 in Australia and the United Kingdom.

Due to the song's leak, its music video was rush-filmed, being directed by Dave Meyers, and was released exclusively in international territories, not being serviced to music channels in the United States. It portrays Jackson filming a DVD for her boyfriend in a futuristic apartment setting, displaying the singer in multiple outfits. The singer embarked on a promotional tour to promote "Just a Little While" and Damita Jo, performing the song on several television shows including Top of the Pops, Ant & Dec's Saturday Night Takeaway, and Hey! Hey! Hey! Music Champ. A performance of the track, filmed during Jackson's promotional tour in Europe, was later included on the From Janet to Damita Jo: The Videos compilation in place of the original music video.

== Background and release ==
Recording sessions for Damita Jo began in August 2002, with Jackson initially collaborating with longtime partners Jimmy Jam and Terry Lewis, and concluded in February 2004 after 18 months, the longest Jackson had spent recording an album. She initially considered pursuing other career plans, but then decided to record another album. For only the second time in her career since Control (1986), Damita Jo saw the singer working with other music producers, including Dallas Austin. The pair worked together on the album in Atlanta from late 2003 until 2004, when they decided which songs would make the final cut. Austin considered Jackson one of the easiest artists to work with, as she was "open to anything you put in front of them". The theme for their collaborations was the singer's own sexuality, as she "always shows what's going on with her life through her records", revealing the phase Jackson is in with her own life. He added that at the time of the sessions, Jackson was in a "really good space right now. She's in love. [...] So we tapped into her happiness". Austin described Damita Jo as "easily the most sexy thing she's done", as well as "one of the best records she's made".

Although Jam was hopeful that the lead single from Damita Jo would be released before the end of 2003, no single was formally announced until a song titled "Just a Little While" leaked online ahead of schedule in January 2004, causing several radio stations in the United States to play it illegally. The leak prompted Virgin Records to formally deliver the song to radio outlets, announcing its release for the day after Jackson's Super Bowl XXXVIII halftime show performance in Houston, on February 2, 2004. Regarding the leak, Jackson commented that the track "was always supposed to be the first single but we weren't prepared to release it". In contrast, Virgin's executive Lionel Ridenour stated that it "was never intended to be the single. It got leaked, and afterward we couldn't pull pop [radio] off of it". "Just a Little While" was released as a CD single in Australia on March 15, 2004, while in the United Kingdom, it was released on April 12, 2004, as two CD singles and a 12-inch vinyl single. In addition to the original, an international version known as the "UK Radio Edit" uses an alternate instrumental, replacing guitars with synthesizers, drums, and electronic beats. A newly recorded urban remix with an alternate instrumental, vocals, and revised lyrics was produced by Just Blaze and titled "Love Me"; it was later included on a promotional Japanese 12-inch vinyl release.

== Recording and composition ==
"Just a Little While"
A 31-second sample of "Just a Little While", depicting its new wave sound influenced by Prince.

"Just a Little While" was recorded at DARP Studios in Atlanta, during sessions conducted by Austin between late 2003 and early 2004. Written by Jackson and Austin, it was produced by the latter, who also played the guitar and keyboards on the track. Tony Reyes was also in charge of playing the guitar, while providing background vocals along with Jackson. It was engineered by Rick Sheppard, who also provided the MIDI and the sound design for the song, while Doug Harms and Cesar Guevara were the assistant engineers. "Just a Little While" was mixed by Kevin "KD" Davis at Charlice Recording in Los Angeles and mastered by Brian "Big Bass" Gardner at Bernie Grundman Mastering in Hollywood, along with all tracks present on Damita Jo.

Musically, "Just a Little While" is a pop rock, dance, and new wave song which "combines frenetic breaks, elements of '80s new wave guitars, and keyboards". Some journalists compared the song to the work of Prince, with Pitchfork's Rich Juzwiak highlighting its keyboards which resemble those of his song "Dirty Mind" (1980). For his part, Jaume Gill, a writer from Yahoo! Music, felt that the keyboards were similar to those of Jackson's own single "Love Will Never Do (Without You)" (1991). As noted by Shannon Miller from The A.V. Club, the track's "light rock set a warm, celebratory tone for a woman newly in love", in contrast to her previous albums that were centered on "heartbreak and percolating rage". IGN's Spence D. speculated whether it was the singer's attempt at alternapop, as she was "unleashing an upbeat, rock infused number", while Ian Wade of BBC Music said the track "echoes the quintessential Janet" of her song "Whoops Now" (1995). Jackson described "Just a Little While" musically as a "a very poppy song with a lot of guitar. It's a happy, up, fun song".

Lyrically, "Just a Little While" showcases Jackson's "signature fashion" of crafting lyrics which appeared "innocent on the surface yet naughty upon closer inspection" as noted by Billboard's Keith Caulfield, noting that it was "about sex, plain and simple". In it, the singer frets about burning her lover out and asserts that her unyielding sex drive will not be a distraction to him, singing, "Maybe I'll just lay around/Play by myself". In a review for the single written by Juzwiak for The Village Voice, he stated that the lyrics were about Jackson just wanting a "zipless fuck", as "like a moth to a flame is Janet's hand to her strawberry (her words!)". He also noted that the singer is "so eager to please that even if the quickie she solicits in the chorus doesn't go down, she'll 'touch it on [her] favorite fruit' anyway", alluding to masturbation. As described by the staff The Scotsman, the song "buries its dirty intentions under a catchy melody".

== Critical reception ==
"Just a Little While" received mixed reviews from music critics. Keith Caulfield from Billboard predicted it to be "another immediate radio hit", commending the "festive, guitar-based" track, and stating that "Janet Jackson knows how to make a great single". Jaume Gill of Yahoo! Music described the song as "a treat", as well as Jackson's "best single in five years", and highlighted its "fun, loose production that smells a little like the eighties". The Washington Post's David Segal praised it as a "very catchy first single", while Ann Powers of Blender wrote that "Dallas Austin gives her a snappy single with the guitar-driven 'Just a Little While.'" Neil Strauss of Rolling Stone considered the track "push-button rock & roll", while Rich Juzwiak, writing for The Village Voice declared that it was "her virgin/whore-iest moment yet", as well as Jackson's "most self-sufficient" single. Stephen Thomas Erlewine, senior editor from AllMusic, considered "Just a Little While" a "good dance tune", whereas The New York Times's Kalefa Sanneh qualified it as "a playful new-wave song". Spence D. of IGN called it the album's "most bizarre flip", noting the "raking guitar chords that propel the song along". Tom Moon from The Philadelphia Inquirer felt that the song contained "that primal quality that gets people moving before they can even process the message."

Peter Piatkowski from PopMatters described "Just a Little While" as a "fantastic mid-tempo rocker" which "deserved to be a huge hit". The Scotsman's staff said it "trumped" other songs on Damita Jo, adding that it was "likely to hang around the charts and our heads for a while". Similarly, Eric R. Danton of the Hartford Courant felt that its discernible melody, as well its "catchy vocal hook" and "a prominent, up-tempo guitar riff" helped the track "stand out from the dross". The Globe and Mail's Robert Everett-Green saw it as "the best thing on the disc", as it "makes you realize just how soporific all the preceding come-ons have been. Maybe somebody finally realized that you could have too much sex after all". In a similar vein, the Ottawa Sun wrote that "Just a Little While" was "the album's most interesting, and energetic moment". For Billboard's Michael Paoletta, it "sounds like nothing else" on the album, speculating whether Jackson "may want to use this as a starting point for her next album". David Browne from Entertainment Weekly highlighted the song's "skittish, pared-down guitar opening" as "fresh and surprising", evoking a vibe "sexier than her Matrix Super Bowl Revolutions outfit"; however, he saw the single as "another lighter-than-air trifle in a career filled with too many of them".

For Yahoo! Music's Angus Batey, the track was "so out of place amid the prevailing slew of slushy sex-obsessed detritus it has to be tacked on at the end, after the outro", despite calling it "brilliant". Similarly, Azeem Ahmad from MusicOMH also thought "Just a Little While" seemed "a little bit out of place. Not that the song isn’t good, it just doesn’t fit with previous tracks", and felt it was not "a bad way to close an album". Lisa Verrico of The Times called it "average" and questioned the "odd" placement in the album's tracklist, criticizing its choice as the lead single, as "Jackson's nipple caused such a fuss, it was thought too risqué to release a sex song", saying the decision "missed the point". In a more negative view, Sal Cinquemani from Slant Magazine called it "a rare misfire for the usually reliable Dallas Austin". It was described as a "serious backfire" by Idolator's Anthony Miccio, who thought that Austin was trying to put Jackson's "breathy voice over a guitar riff Pink probably rejected" and wrote that while "Black Cat" (1990) showed that she could rock, "Just a Little While" proved that the singer could not "rock sweetly". For Rashod D. Ollison of The Baltimore Sun, it was a "corny rock track", while The Observer's journalist Kitty Empire said the single was "so-so". Ernest Hardy of LA Weekly opined that it was "anything other than album filler".

== Commercial performance ==
In the United States, "Just a Little While" quickly became the most added and played song on pop radio formats upon its release. Its airplay increased over 500% in contrast to airplays before its official release and achieved "sizeable" downloads. It debuted at number 47 on the week dated February 21, 2004, on the Billboard Hot 100 chart, becoming the "hot shot debut" of the week. The next week, the track reached its peak of number 45, where it stayed for two weeks. The song became Jackson's lowest peaking single on the chart since "Come Give Your Love to Me" (1983). Its poor chart performance was attributed to Jackson's Super Bowl performance incident, as numerous radio formats and music channels owned by Viacom and CBS, including subsidiaries Infinity Broadcasting, and MTV, as well as Clear Channel Communications, had blacklisted Jackson's singles and music videos after being heavily fined and censored by the Federal Communications Commission (FCC). Almost two months upon its release, People's Todd Peterson noted that the song "disappeared from radio-station play lists without much fanfare". Allan Raible of ABC News felt that had the Super Bowl incident not happened, the single "would have been enough to make the album more of a success". However, Jackson blamed its leak as the reason for the lacklustre commercial performance.

"Just a Little While" was commercially more successful worldwide. In the United Kingdom, the track debuted at number 15 on the UK Singles Chart on the week dated April 24, 2004, and spent five weeks inside the chart. In April 2021, it was revealed by the Official Charts Company that the single was Jackson's 38th most-downloaded track in the region. The song attained similar success in Scotland, where it reached a peak of number 16. However, "Just a Little While" experienced polarized success in other parts of Europe. In Denmark, the song entered the national charts at number 17 but charted for a sole week. In France, it debuted at its peak of number 72 and spent five weeks on the chart. The single was more successful in Spain, where it reached number six and had a four-week run. Elsewhere in Europe, "Just a Little While" reached the top 40 in countries such as Greece, Hungary, Ireland and Switzerland. The song entered at number 20 in Australia's national singles chart for the week dated March 28, 2004, and spent eight weeks inside the tally. In Canada, it debuted at number three on the chart compiled by Nielsen SoundScan for the issue dated April 3, 2004.

== Music video ==
Jackson listening to a first generation iPod in the music video for "Just a Little While"

No music video was filmed at the moment "Just a Little While" leaked, leading Jackson and her record company to produce a video for it ahead of its scheduled time. The clip was directed by Dave Meyers. It opens with Jackson's boyfriend receiving a package addressed to a hotel in Tokyo, containing a DVD and note reading "Love, Janet". As the DVD begins, Jackson is revealed lying in bed as she films herself. She is then seen wearing a black and red leather outfit designed by Lip Service, in addition to several red chokers. The singer is then shown in an alternate room wearing sunglasses and eating strawberries. The camcorder faces the window, revealing a futuristic setting and hovering unidentified aircraft. She begins to dance in her bedroom while listening to a first generation iPod, and also vacuums the floor. Various camcorder messages such as "error" and "end of tape" flash across the screen momentarily.

Jackson's boyfriend plays a second DVD, showing her adorned in a red outfit and long ponytail while near a water fountain. The following scene portrays Jackson in the apartment's main living quarters while drinking wine. Jackson's full midriff and navel piercing can now be seen, as aircraft are shown in the background. Jackson's three female friends arrive, who proceed to film each other in various cut scenes. She is then seen lying near a fireplace as her friends are passed out on the floor. A final setting of a blonde Jackson is shown in a kitchen, unveiled in a white Versace outfit while preparing a meal for her boyfriend. He enters and surprises her with a present, revealed to be a gray kitten. Jackson shows her gift to the camcorder as various scenes are shown. The video ends with Jackson blowing a kiss as a final "end of tape" message flashes.

The music video for "Just a Little While" was serviced to music channels in Europe, receiving its premiere on MTV UK's TRL UK on March 8, 2004. The video also received airplay on Canadian music channels MuchMusic and MuchMoreMusic. However, it did not receive a release in the United States, thus affecting the single's commercial performance in the region; it had initially been scheduled to premiere on VH1 and BET the week of March 8, 2004, but this did not take place. The clip was later included on the song's enhanced single released in the United Kingdom. Upon its debut, the staff of The Record declared that it had "already got the fans excited with its sexy video". In a retrospective review, Steffanee Wang from Nylon noted how "pretty innovative" the video was for its time, as Jackson "films herself dancing, selfie-style" during the clip. The three outfits Jackson wears in the music video were all auctioned in May 2021, in an auction conducted by Julien's Auctions.

== Live performances ==
In March 2004, Billboard reported that Jackson would embark on a promotional tour for Damita Jo, comprising regions such as France, the United Kingdom, as well as Japan and Canada. The singer appeared on Hit Machine in France to perform "Just a Little While"; it was followed by performances of the track in several televised shows in the United Kingdom, such as TRL UK, Top of the Pops, CD:UK, T4, and Ant & Dec's Saturday Night Takeaway. The performance on T4 was included on Jackson's From Janet to Damita Jo: The Videos compilation in place of the original video; it depicts the singer and several dancers performing among various light fixtures resembling laser beams. She then continued touring in promotion of the album, performing the song at Hey! Hey! Hey! Music Champ in Japan, Much on Demand in Canada, as well as at MSN Music's studios in Seattle, along with other tracks from Damita Jo. An instrumental version of the "Love Me" remix of Just A Little While was used for the intro video played during the first leg of the Janet Jackson: Together Again tour in 2023.

== Track listings ==
- Australian 12-inch single

A. "Just a Little While" (album version) – 4:11
B. "Just a Little While" (Maurice's Nu Soul remix) – 7:12

- Australian and Japanese CD single
1. "Just a Little While" (Single radio edit) – 3:59
2. "Just a Little While" (Peter Rauhofer club mix) – 9:28
3. "Just a Little While" (Maurice's Nu Soul remix) – 7:12
- US CD single
1. "Just a Little While" (Single radio edit) – 3:59
2. "Just a Little While" (Peter Rauhofer radio edit) – 3:58
3. "Just a Little While" (Peter Rauhofer club mix) – 9:28
4. "Just a Little While" (Maurice's Nu Soul radio edit) – 3:36
5. "Just a Little While" (Maurice's Nu Soul remix) – 7:12
- US double 12-inch single

A. "Just a Little While" (Peter Rauhofer club mix) – 9:28
B. "Just a Little While" (Peter Rauhofer dub mix) – 6:37
C. "Just a Little While" (Maurice's Nu Soul remix) – 7:12
D. "Just a Little While" (Maurice's Nu Soul dub) – 7:14

- UK 12-inch single

A1. "Just a Little While" (album version) – 4:11
A2. "Just a Little While" (Maurice's Nu Soul remix) – 7:12
B1. "Just a Little While" (Peter Rauhofer club mix) – 9:28

- UK CD 1
1. "Just a Little While" (UK radio edit) – 4:05
2. "Just a Little While" (Peter Rauhofer radio edit) – 3:58
- UK CD 2
1. "Just a Little While" (UK radio edit) – 4:04
2. "Janet Megamix 04" (Chris Cox radio edit) – 4:15
3. "Just a Little While" (Maurice's Nu Soul remix) – 7:12
4. "Just a Little While" (video) – 4:19
- Canadian CD single
1. "Just a Little While" (Single radio edit) – 3:59
2. "Just a Little While" (Peter Rauhofer radio edit) – 3:58

== Credits and personnel ==
Credits and personnel adapted from the liner notes of Damita Jo.

- Janet Jackson – main and background vocals, songwriter
- Dallas Austin – songwriter, producer, guitar, keyboards
- Tony Reyes – guitar, background vocals
- Rick Sheppard – engineer, MIDI, sound design
- Doug Harms – assistant engineer
- Cesar Guevara – assistant engineer
- Kevin "KD" Davis – mixing
- Brian "Big Bass" Gardner – mastering

== Charts ==
=== Weekly charts ===
Weekly chart positions for "Just a Little While"
| Chart (2004) | Peak position |
|---|---|
| Australia (ARIA) | 20 |
| Australian Urban (ARIA) | 6 |
| Belgium (Ultratop 50 Flanders) | 44 |
| Belgium (Ultratip Bubbling Under Wallonia) | 2 |
| Canada (Nielsen SoundScan) | 3 |
| Croatia (HRT) | 4 |
| Denmark (Tracklisten) | 17 |
| France (SNEP) | 72 |
| Germany (GfK) | 54 |
| Greece (IFPI) | 33 |
| Hungary (Rádiós Top 40) | 30 |
| Hungary (Single Top 40) | 10 |
| Ireland (IRMA) | 32 |
| Italy (FIMI) | 16 |
| Japan (Oricon) | 157 |
| Netherlands (Dutch Top 40 Tipparade) | 3 |
| Netherlands (Single Top 100) | 43 |
| Romania (Romanian Top 100) | 51 |
| Scottish Singles Sales (Official Charts) | 16 |
| Spain (AFYVE) | 6 |
| Switzerland (Schweizer Hitparade) | 37 |
| UK Singles (Official Charts) | 15 |
| UK Hip Hop/R&B (Official Charts) | 22 |
| US Billboard Hot 100 | 45 |
| US Adult Pop Airplay (Billboard) | 38 |
| US Dance Club Songs (Billboard) | 1 |
| US Dance Singles Sales (Billboard) | 4 |
| US Dance Airplay (Billboard) | 17 |
| US Pop Airplay (Billboard) | 17 |

=== Year-end charts ===
Year-end chart positions for "Just a Little While"
| Chart (2004) | Position |
|---|---|
| US Dance Club Play (Billboard) | 28 |

== Release history ==
Release dates and formats for "Just a Little While"
| Region | Date | Format(s) | Label(s) | Ref. |
|---|---|---|---|---|
| United States | February 2, 2004 | Contemporary hit radio; rhythmic contemporary radio | Virgin | |
| Australia | March 15, 2004 | Maxi CD | EMI | |
| France | March 15, 2004 | Maxi CD | EMI | |
| Germany | March 15, 2004 | 12-inch vinyl; maxi CD | EMI | |
| Canada | March 16, 2004 | CD | Virgin | |
| Japan | March 17, 2004 | Maxi CD | EMI | |
| France | March 30, 2004 | CD | EMI | |
| United Kingdom | April 12, 2004 | 12-inch vinyl; CD; maxi CD | Virgin | |

== See also ==
- List of number-one dance singles of 2004 (U.S.)
