= Broadcast Decency Enforcement Act of 2005 =

2006 United States law

The Broadcast Decency Enforcement Act of 2005 (S.193.ENR,Pub. L. 109–235 (text) (PDF)) is an enrolled bill, passed by both Houses of the 109th United States Congress, to increase the fines and penalties for violating the prohibitions against the broadcast of obscene, indecent, or profane language. It was originally proposed in 2004 as the Broadcast Decency Enforcement Act of 2004 (S. 2056/H.R. 3717); this preliminary bill was never passed. Republican Senator Sam Brownback of Kansas sponsored both United States Senate bills; Senators Joe Lieberman (D-Conn.), Lindsey Graham (R-S.C.), Rick Santorum (R-Pa.), George Allen (R-Va.) initially co-sponsored the bill at its reintroduction on January 26, 2005.

== History ==
The bill became public law No. 109-235 on June 15, 2006, when President George W. Bush signed it in the Dwight D. Eisenhower Executive Office Building. By this time, the bill was co-sponsored by 27 senators in total. As President Bush made his signature, he commented that the bill was ultimately "going to help American parents by making broadcast television and radio more family-friendly." The bill's credibility and justification for stronger censorship has been contested as a challenger to free speech and artistic expression.

The push for stronger government policies that enforce censorship peaked after the Federal Communications Commission (FCC) investigated the incident that occurred during the Super Bowl XXXVIII Halftime Show in 2004. An estimated 140 million people were watching the show when at the end, pop star Justin Timberlake popped off part of Janet Jackson's corset, exposing her breast. The subsequent "Nipplegate" controversy was a prominent topic of discussion of the general public. At the time, the FCC Chairman Michael Powell said MTV and the CBS network's more than 200 affiliates and company-owned stations could be fined $27,500 a piece. The FCC made notice about the complaints received in the weeks after the incident. The Commission ultimately remarked, "The Commission does, however, have the authority to enforce statutory and regulatory provisions restricting indecency. Specifically, it is a violation of federal law to broadcast obscene, indecent or profane programming. Title 18 of the United States Code, Section 1464 prohibits the utterance of any 'obscene, indecent or profane language by means of radio communication.'" The range of the FCC's authority over censorship for inappropriate conduct on the airwaves, however, was only a part of the concern. As the investigation developed, the major concern was whether or not the monetary retribution for violation was adequate enough.

With the proposal of the Broadcast Decency Enforcement Act of 2004, it was to be determined by the Commissioner that any violator was subject to fines up to $275,000 for the first violation, $375,000 for the second violation, and $500,000 for the third and any subsequent violations. The incremental increase of fines seemed appropriate, but the Houses continuously amended the bill and ultimately it never passed. A strong resistance within the creative community rose in conjunction with the fine appropriation. Radio host Dave Ross noted that "The concern, of course, is that if Congress has the power to outlaw one word, it has the power to outlaw another word.... And the fact that it was indecency and not politics doesn't make that much difference, because if you give the government the power to decide what you can hear, you've given them power over discourse." With responses like these, the legislation eventually lost the momentum behind it. The last action on the bill occurred as it was placed on Senate Legislative Calendar under General Orders. Calendar No. 464 on March 24, 2004.

The bill resurfaced again, a year later, still under the sponsorship of Sen. Brownback. This time, it also received disapproval from a fellow state official, who reprised the concern of the creative community as an offense to the United States Constitution. Congressman Gary Ackerman of the 5th District of New York expressed that "We need to defend our Constitution. We need to defend freedom of speech, and that is really what is at stake here. Passing this bill is a huge mistake and this vote will mark a very dark day in American history. We are going down a slippery slope and no one can honestly say where it will stop. A vote for this bill is a frontal assault on our Constitution and the protections that it gives to the American people."

On June 7, 2006 the House of Representatives proposed a roll call of 230 on a motion to suspend the rules and pass the bill. There were 379 yeas, 35 nays, and 18 withheld votes.

== Text ==
The Broadcast Decency Enforcement Act of 2005 reads as follows:

One Hundred Ninth Congress of the United States of America
AT THE SECOND SESSION
Begun and held at the City of Washington on Tuesday,
the third day of January, two thousand and six

An Act

To increase the penalties for violations by television and radio broadcasters of the prohibitions against transmission of obscene, indecent, and profane language.
Be it enacted by the Senate and House of Representatives of the United States of America in Congress assembled,

SECTION 1. SHORT TITLE. This Act may be cited as the 'Broadcast Decency Enforcement Act of 2005'.

SEC. 2. INCREASE IN PENALTIES FOR OBSCENE, INDECENT, AND PROFANE BROADCASTS. Section 503(b)(2) of the Communications Act of 1934 (47 U.S.C. 503(b)(2)) is amended--
(1) by redesignating subparagraphs (C) and (D) as subparagraphs (D) and (E), respectively;
(2) by inserting after subparagraph (B) the following new subparagraph:
'(C) Notwithstanding subparagraph (A), if the violator is--
'(i)(I) a broadcast station licensee or permittee; or
'(II) an applicant for any broadcast license, permit, certificate, or other instrument or authorization issued by the Commission; and
'(ii) determined by the Commission under paragraph (1) to have broadcast obscene, indecent, or profane language, the amount of any forfeiture penalty determined under this subsection shall not exceed $325,000 for each violation or each day of a continuing violation, except that the amount assessed for any continuing violation shall not exceed a total of $3,000,000 for any single act or failure to act.'; and
(3) in subparagraph (D), as redesignated by paragraph (1), by striking 'subparagraph (A) or (B) and inserting 'subparagraph (A), (B), or (C)'.

== Hearing ==
The United States House Energy Subcommittee on Communications and Technology had its hearing on February 11, 2004.

Participants

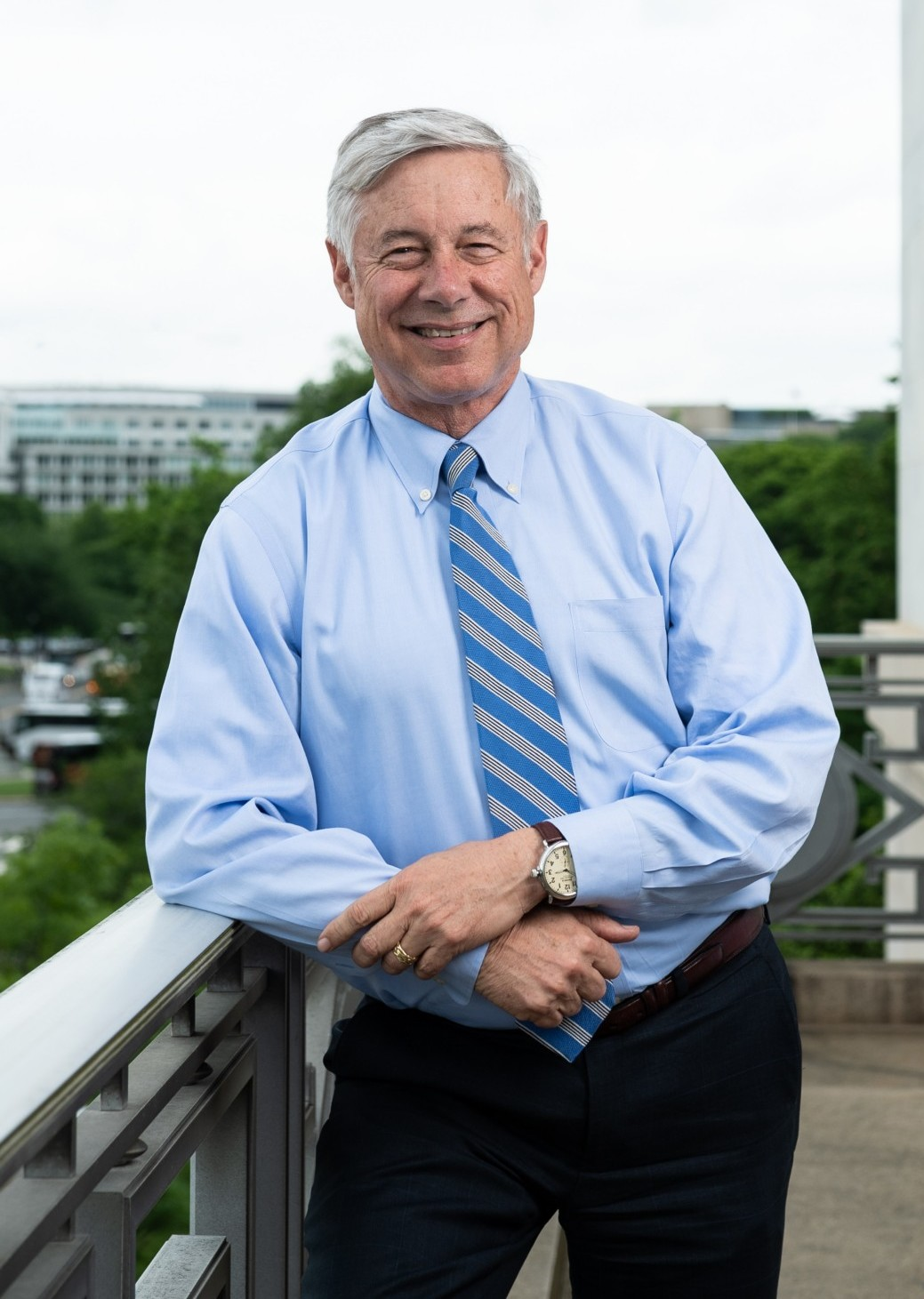
Fred Upton (R-MI), Chairman of the hearing

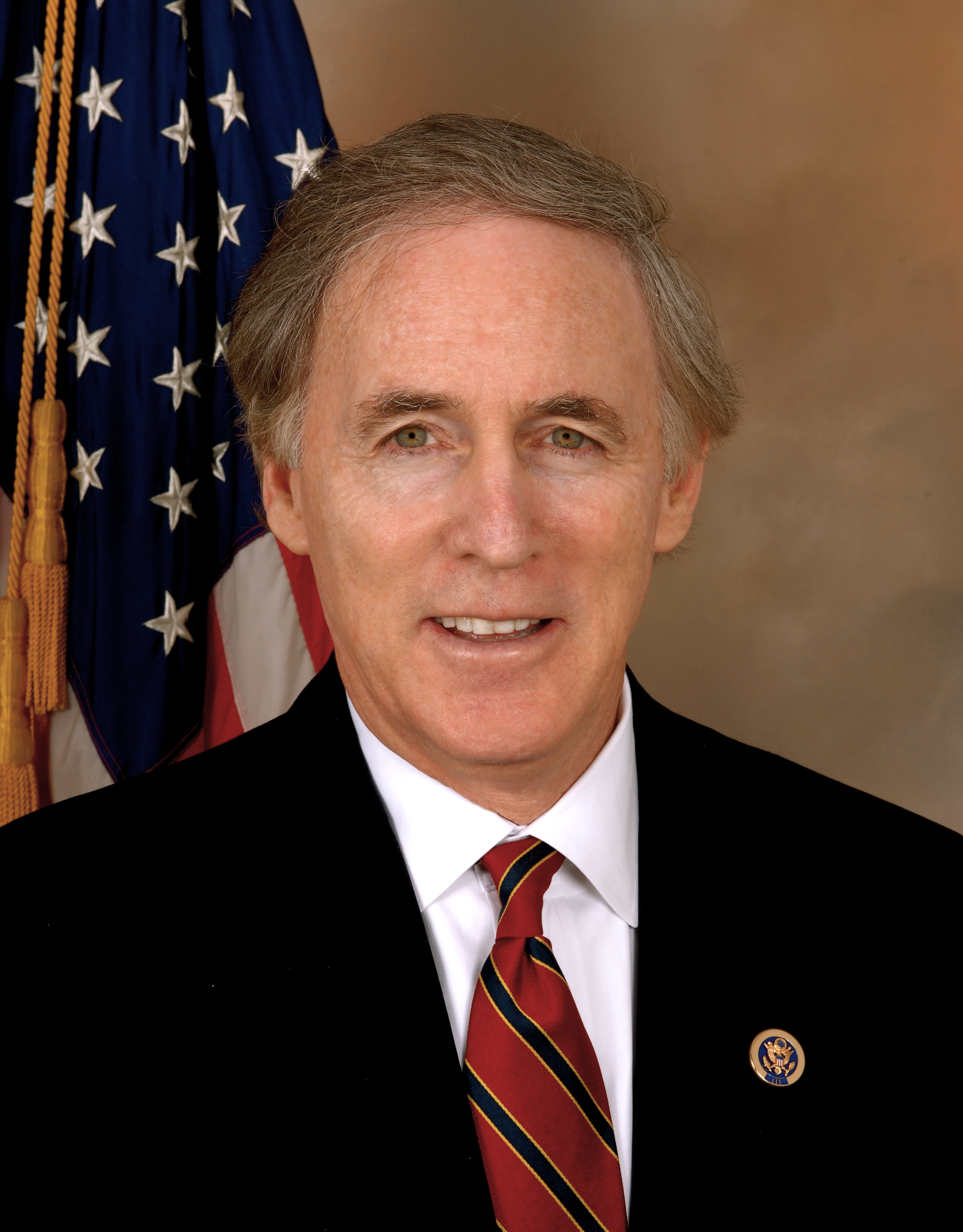
Cliff Stearns (R-CA), Vice Chairman of the hearing

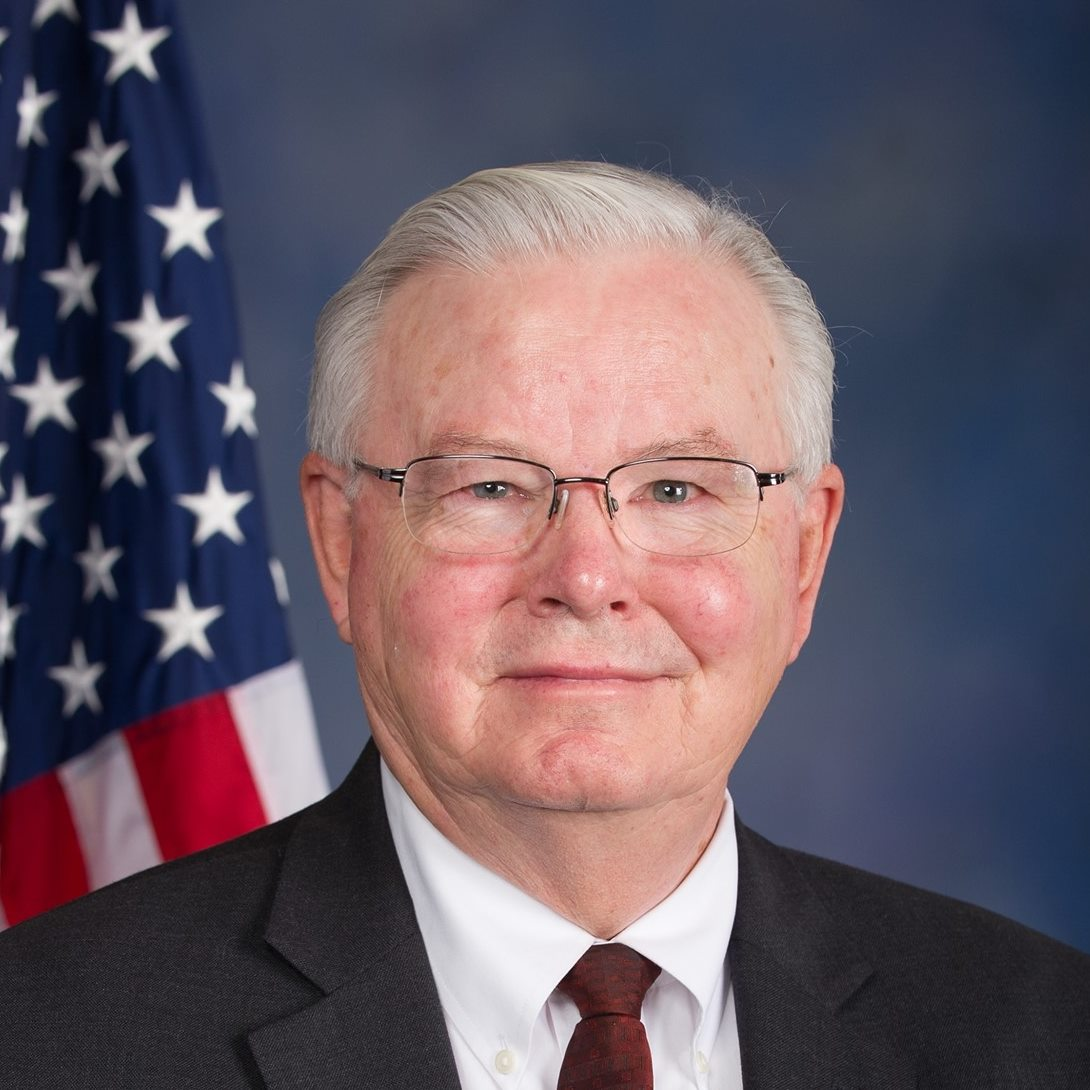
Joe Barton (R-TX)

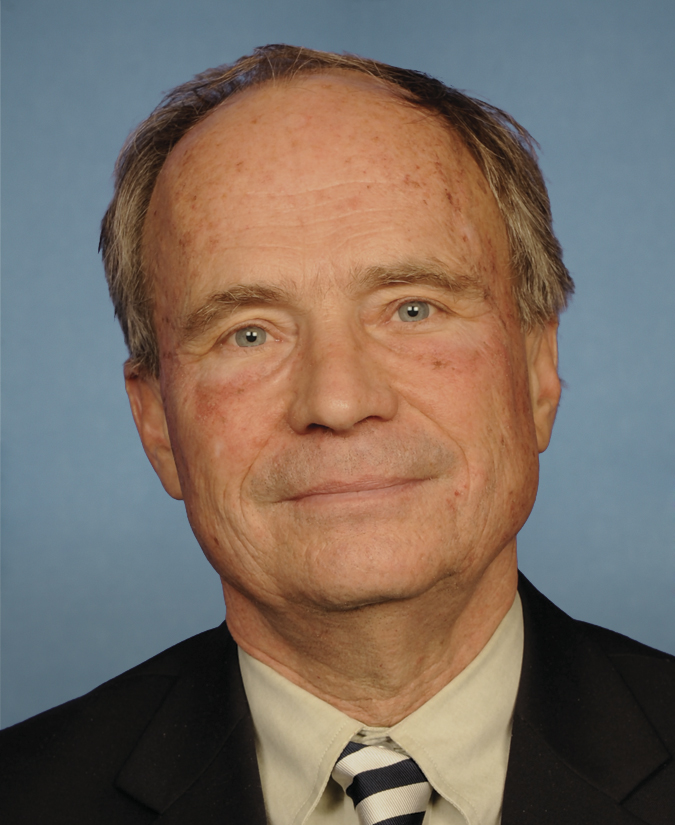
Charles Bass (R-NH)

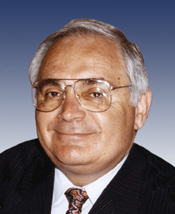
Michael Bilirakis (R-FL)

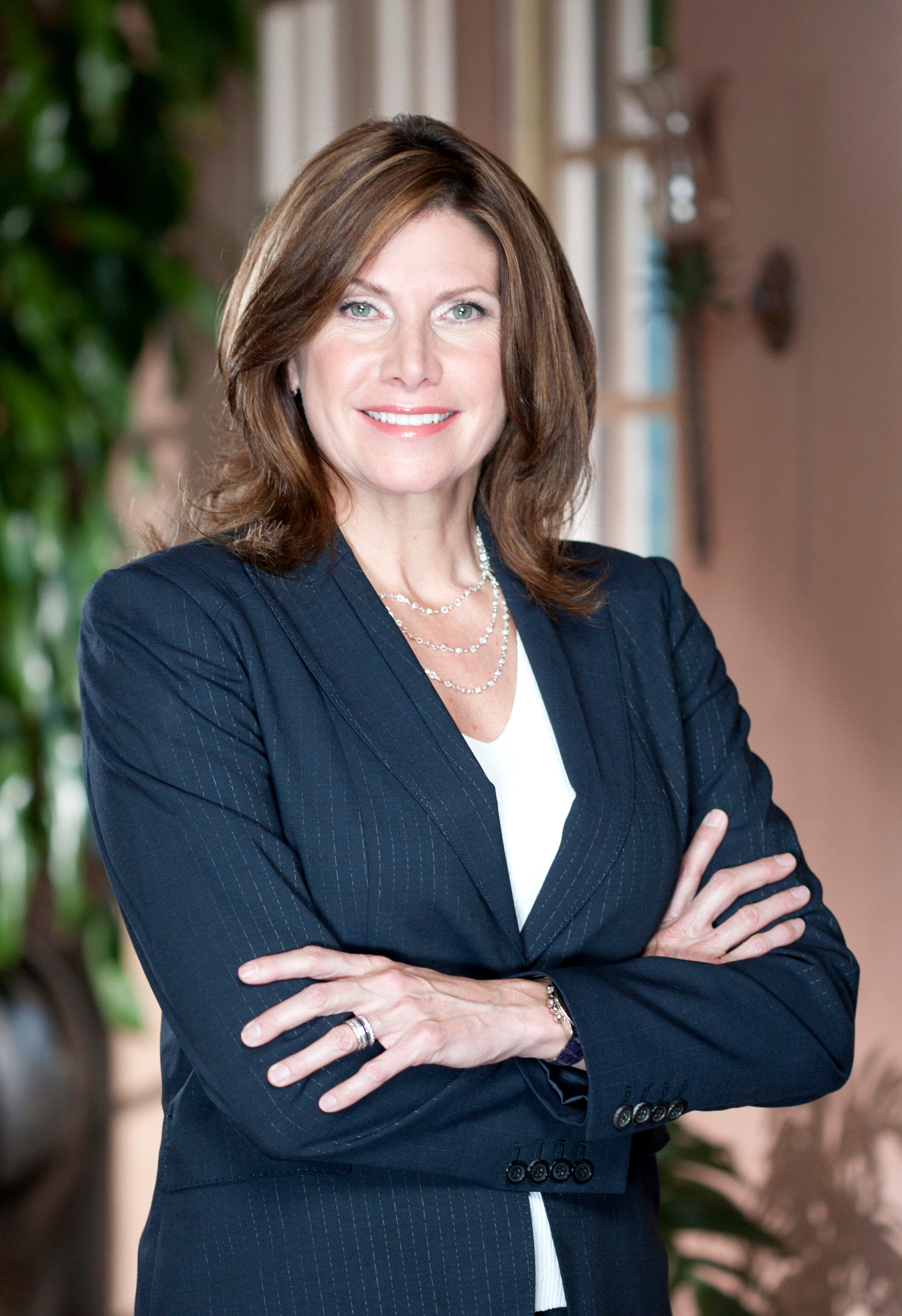
Mary Bono (R-CA)

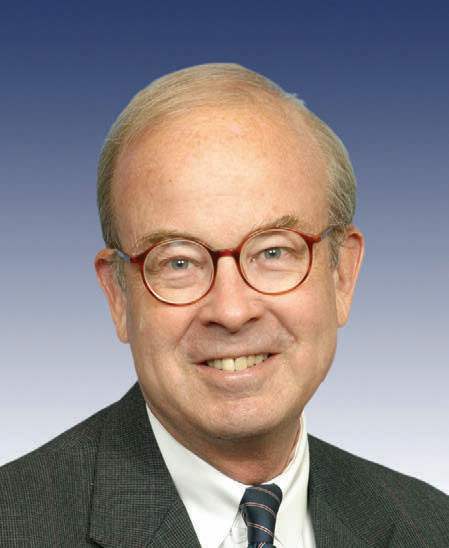
Rick Boucher (D-VA)

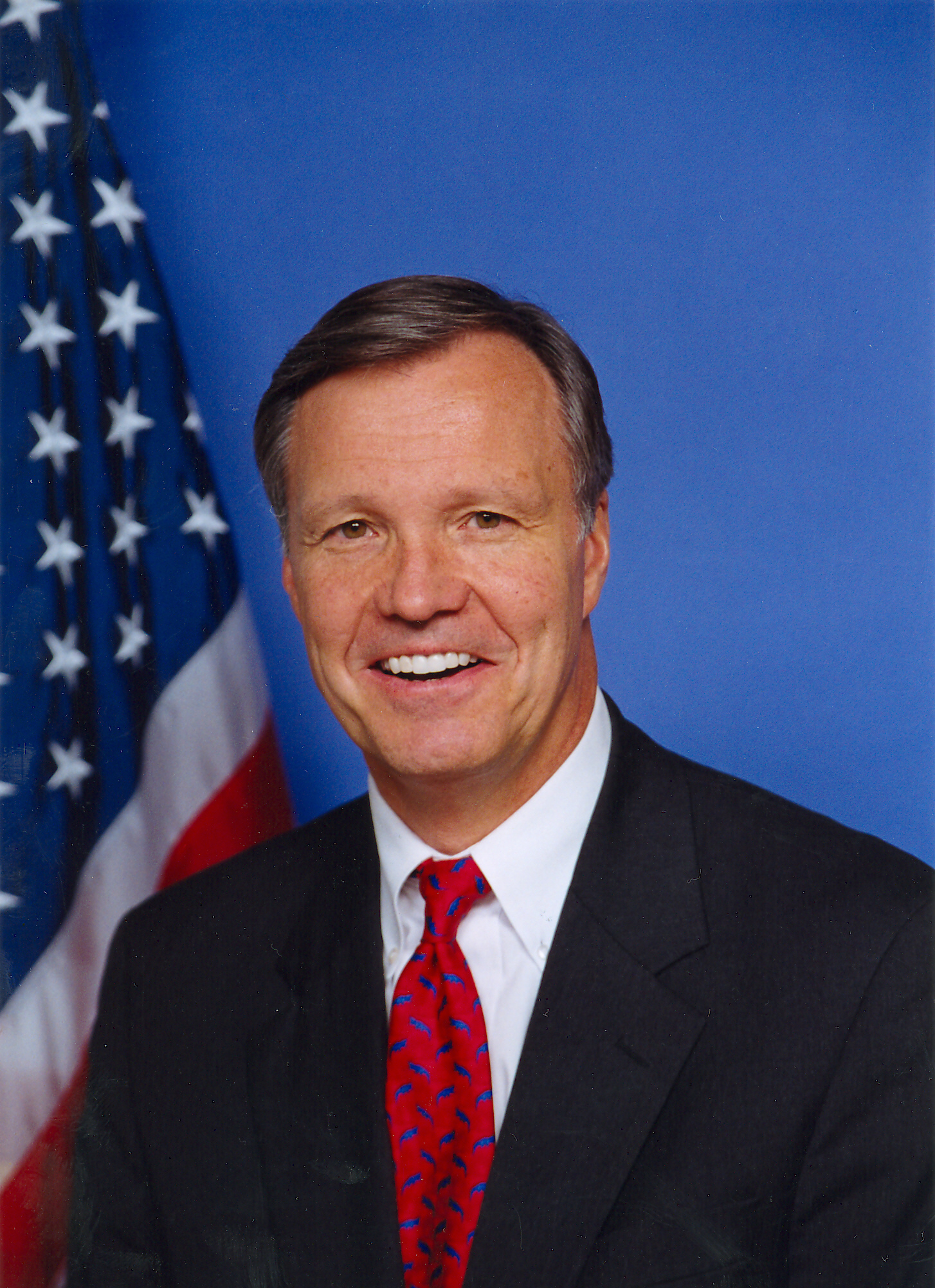
Christopher Cox (R-CA)

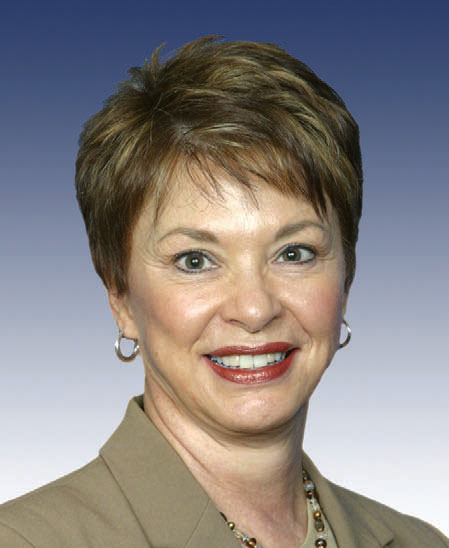
Barbara Cubin (R-WY)

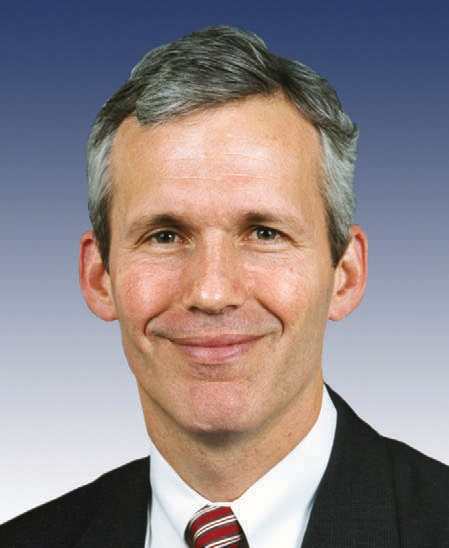
Jim Davis (D-FL)

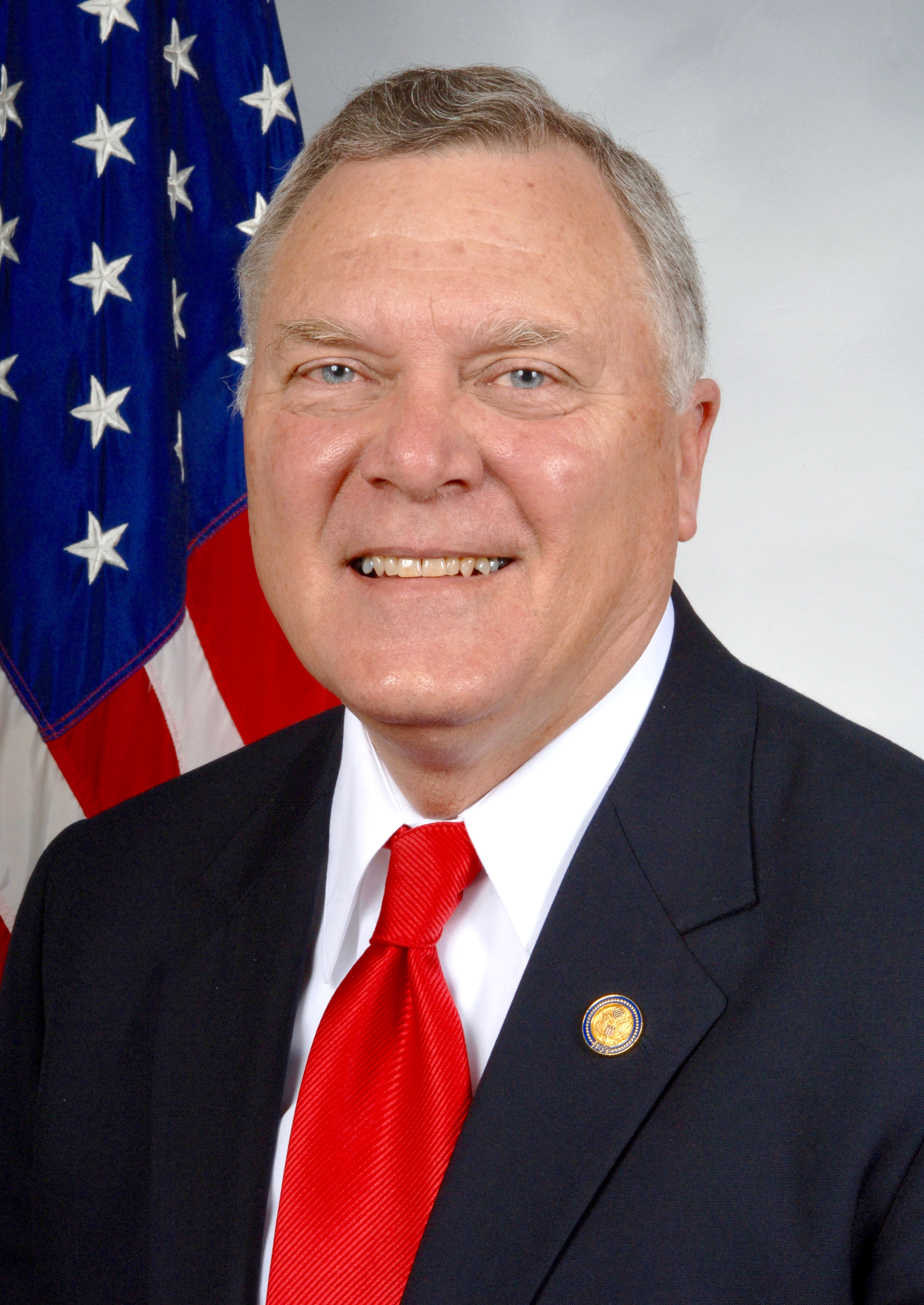
Nathan Deal (R-GA)

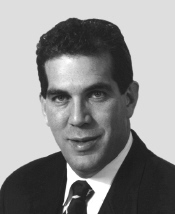
Peter Deutsch (D-FL)

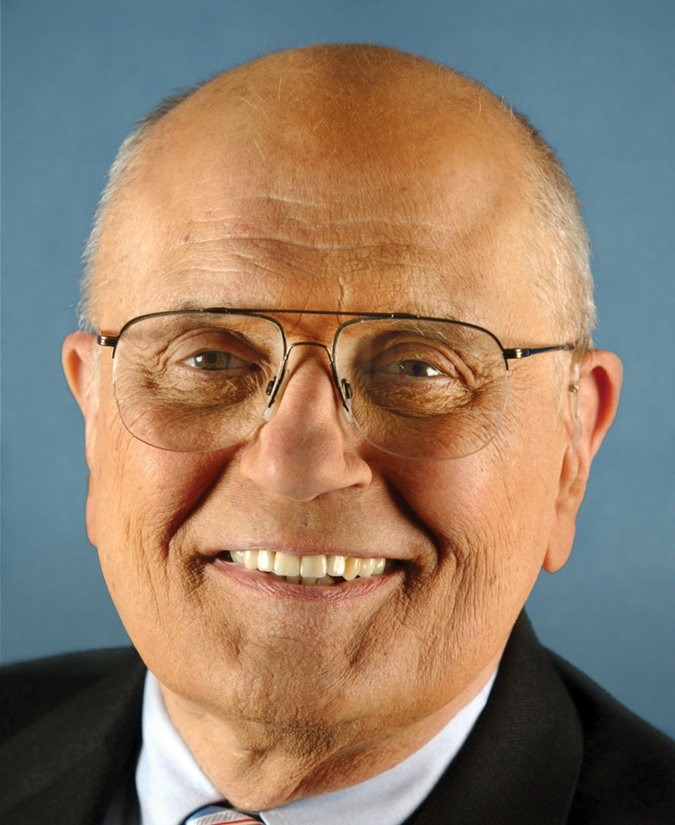
John Dingell (D-MI)

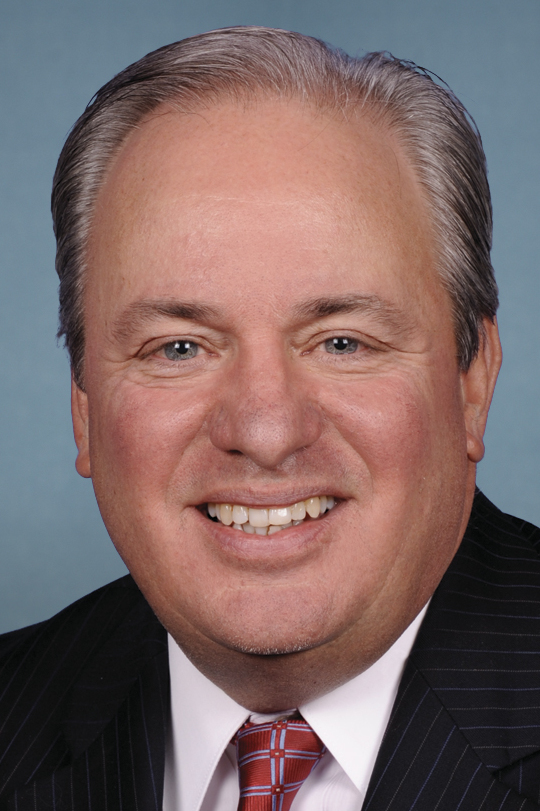
Mike Doyle (D-PA)

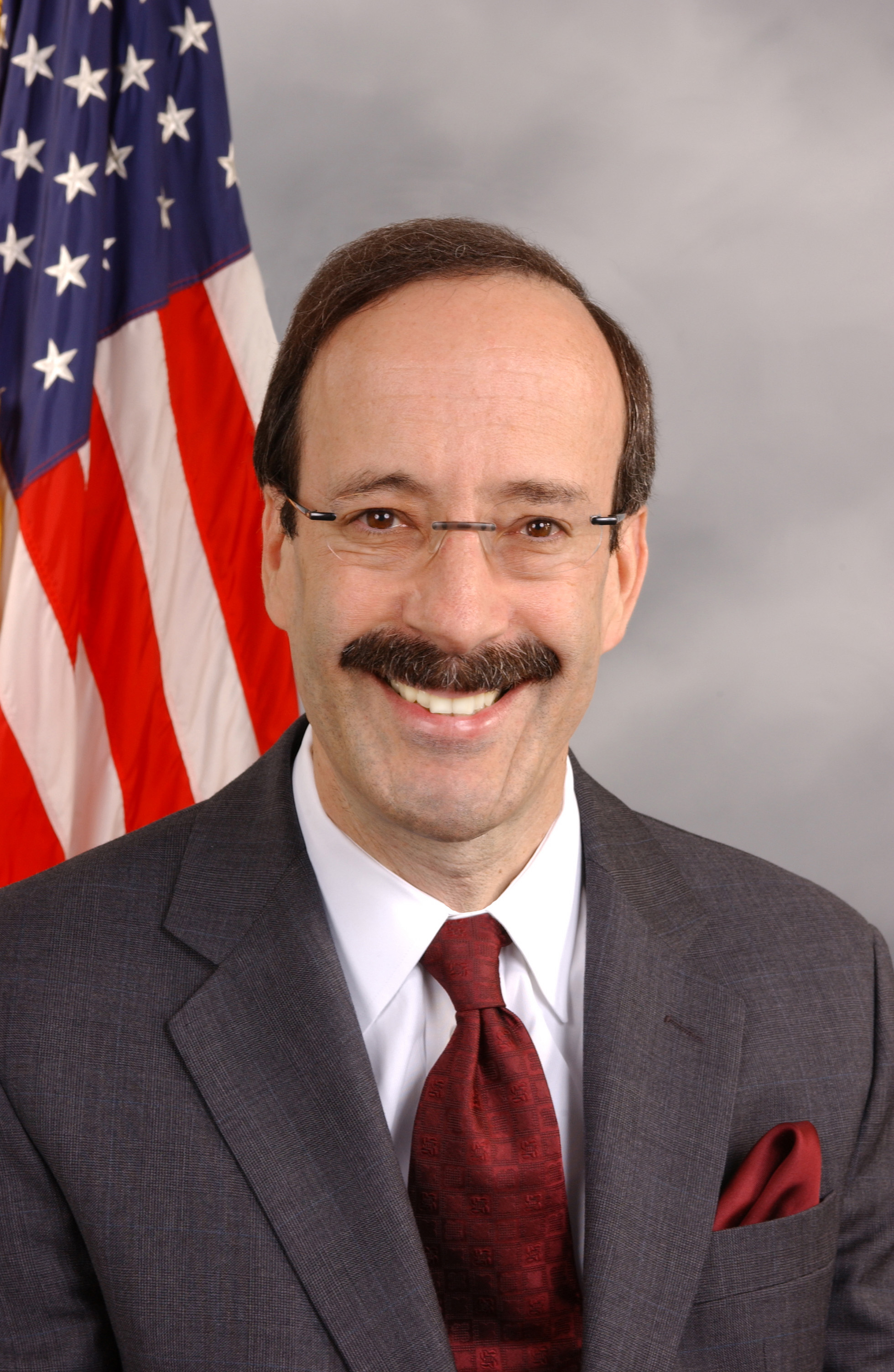
Eliot Engel (D-NY)

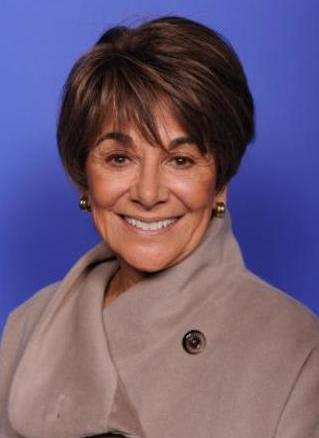
Anna Eshoo (D-CA)

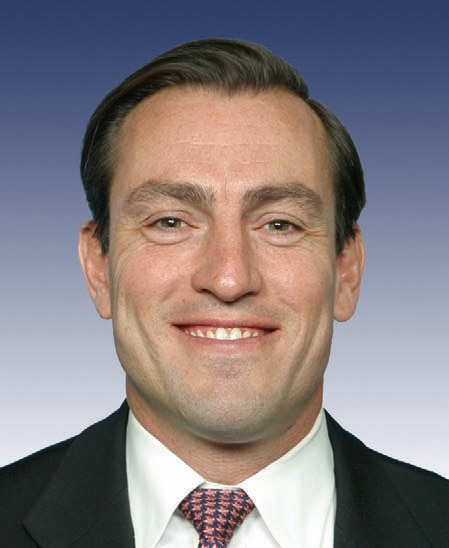
Vito Fossella (R-NY)

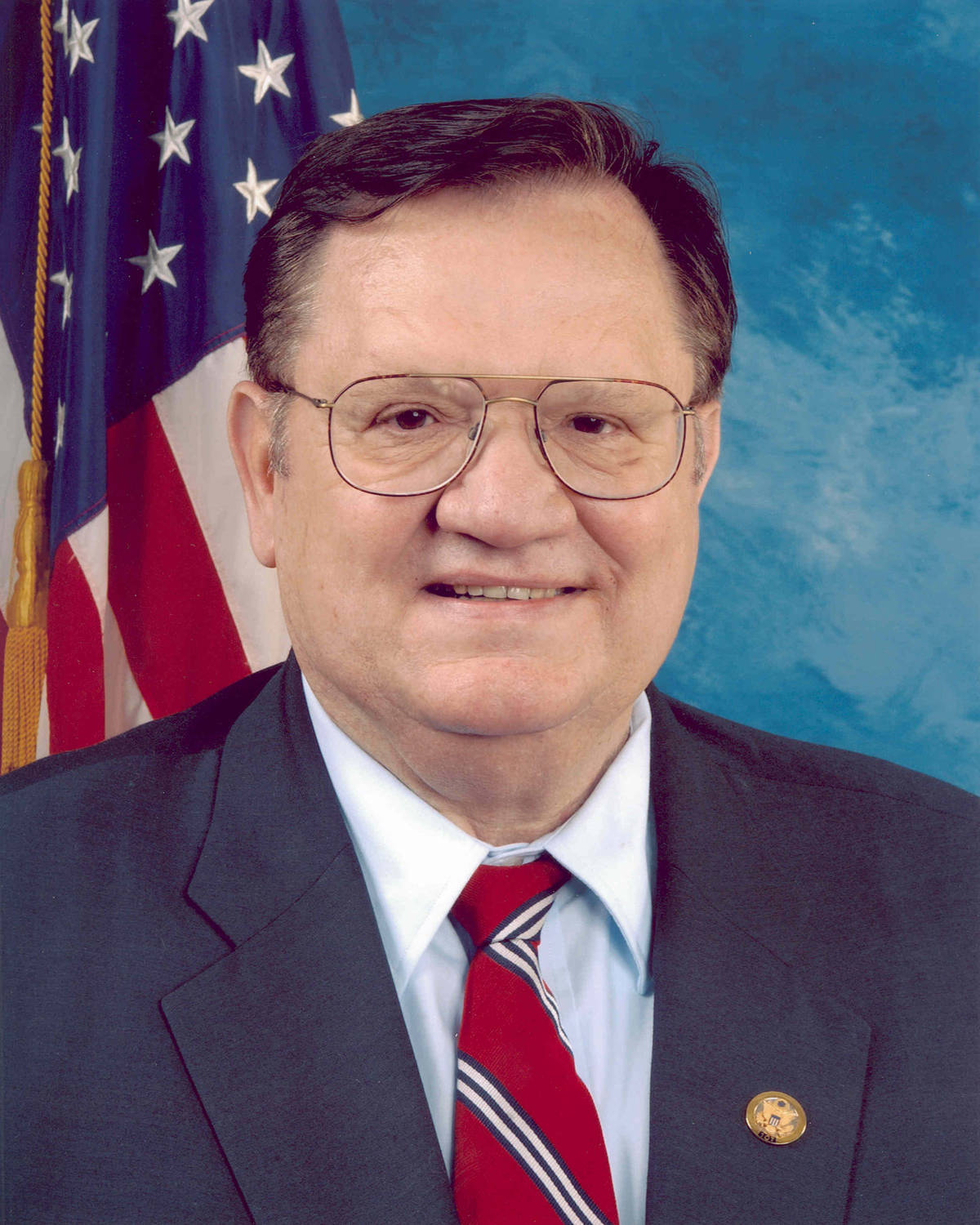
Paul Gillmor (R-OH)

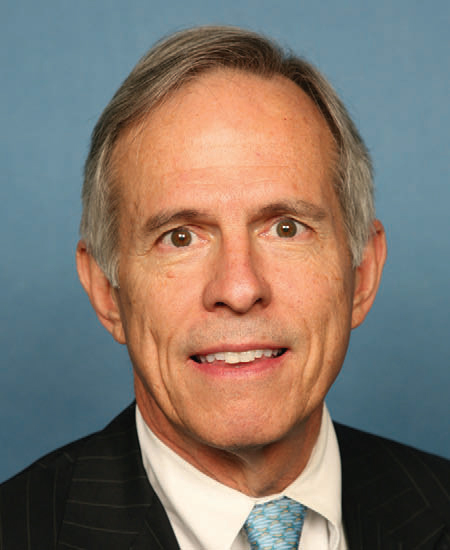
Bart Gordon (D-TN)

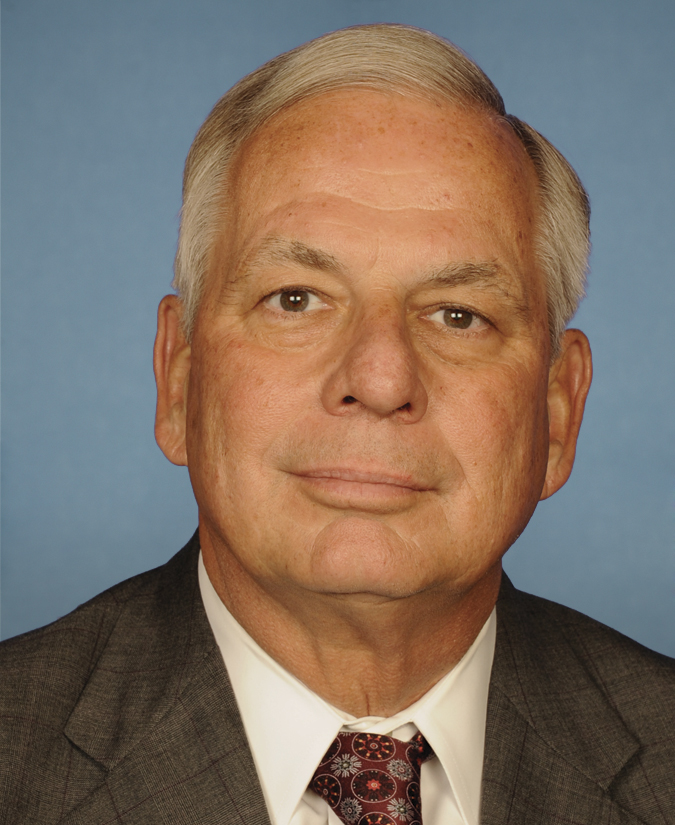
Gene Green (D-TX)

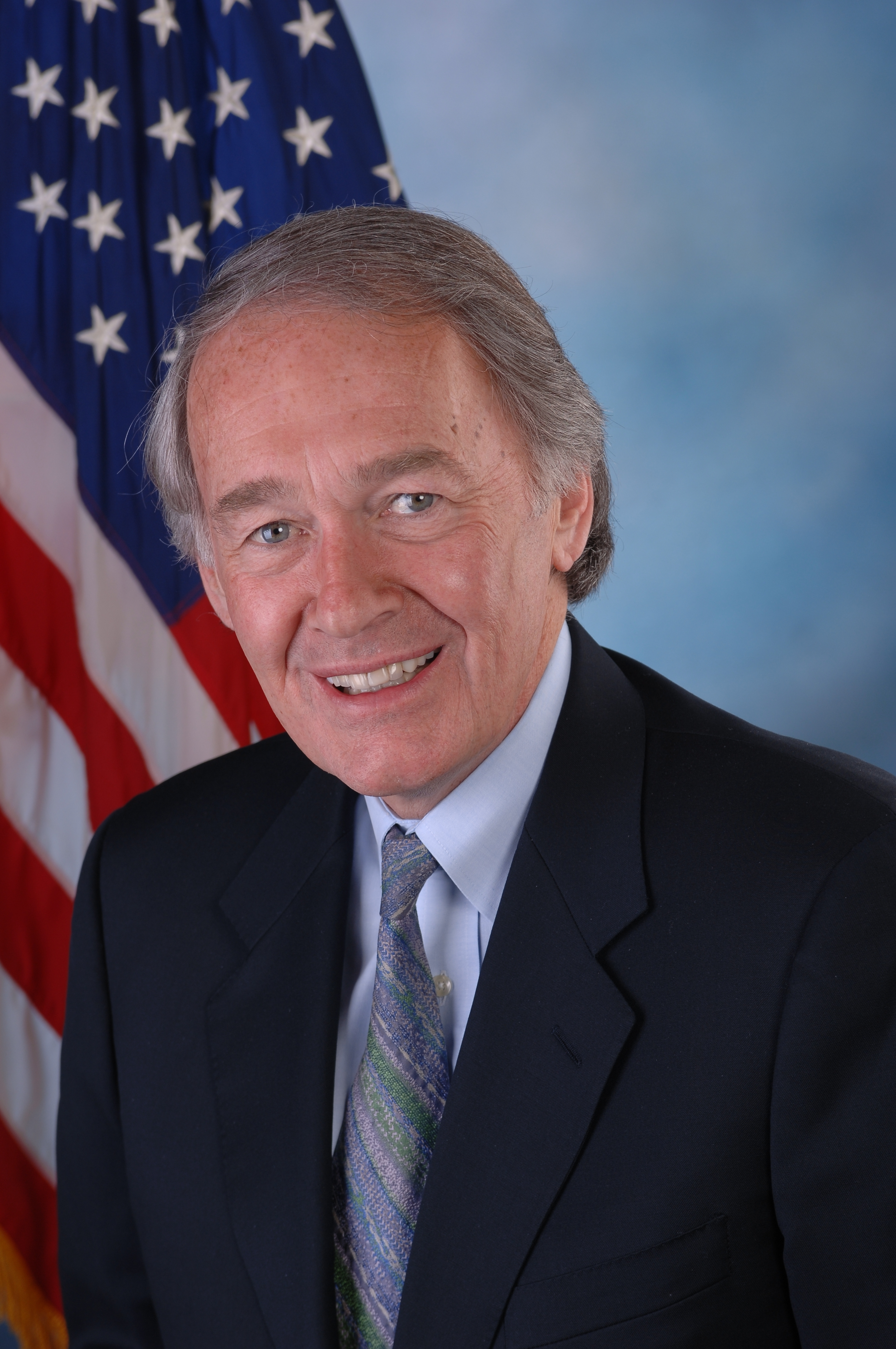
Edward Markey (D-MA), Ranking Member

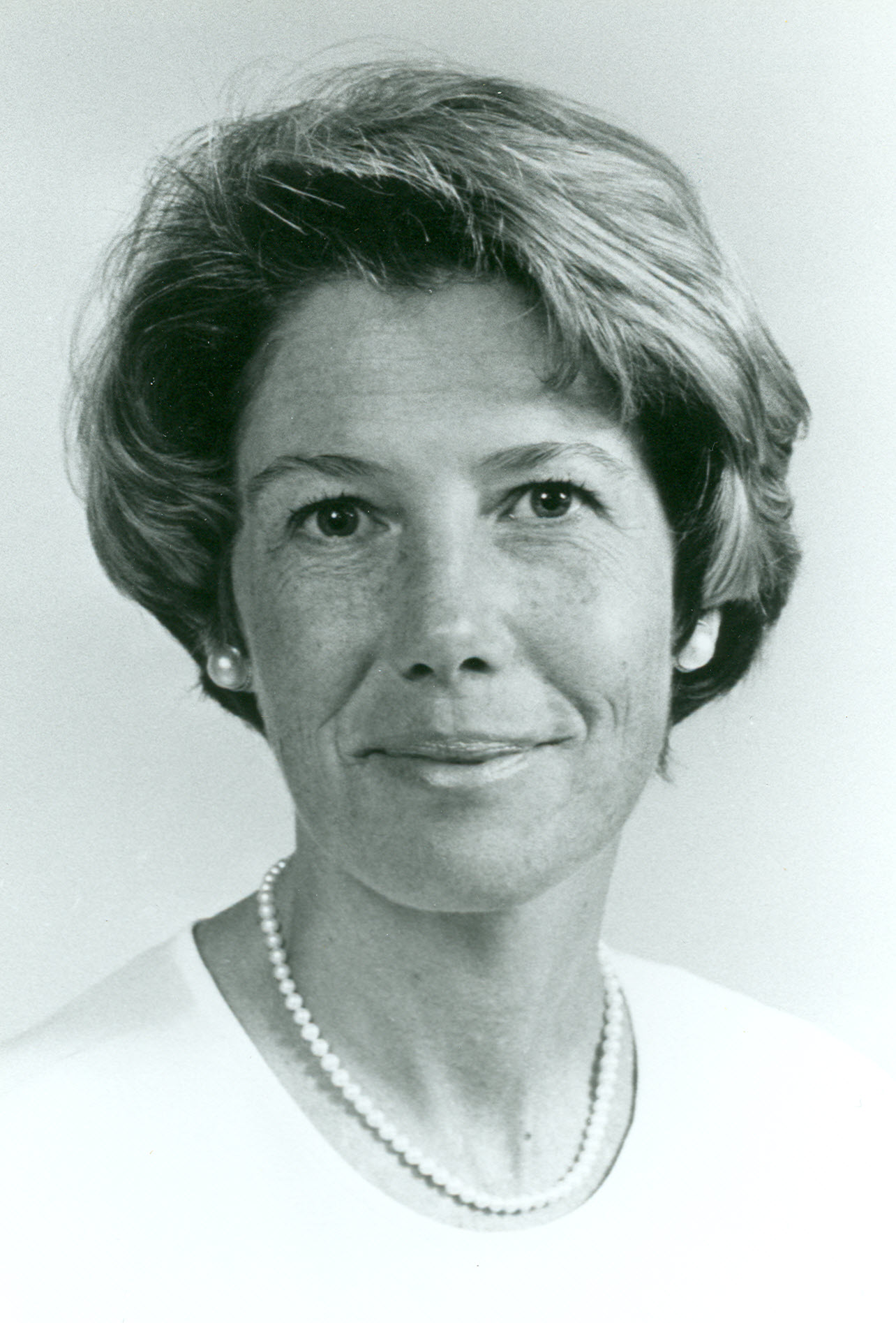
Karen McCarthy (D-MO)

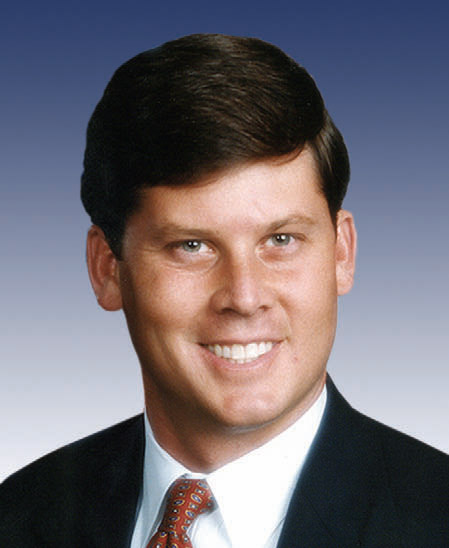
Chip Pickering (R-MS)

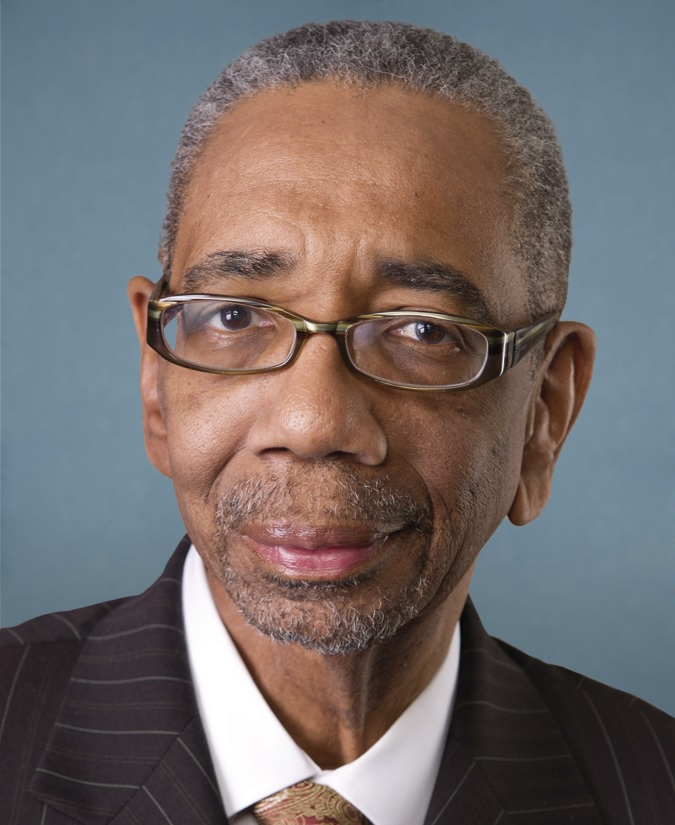
Bobby Rush (D-IL)

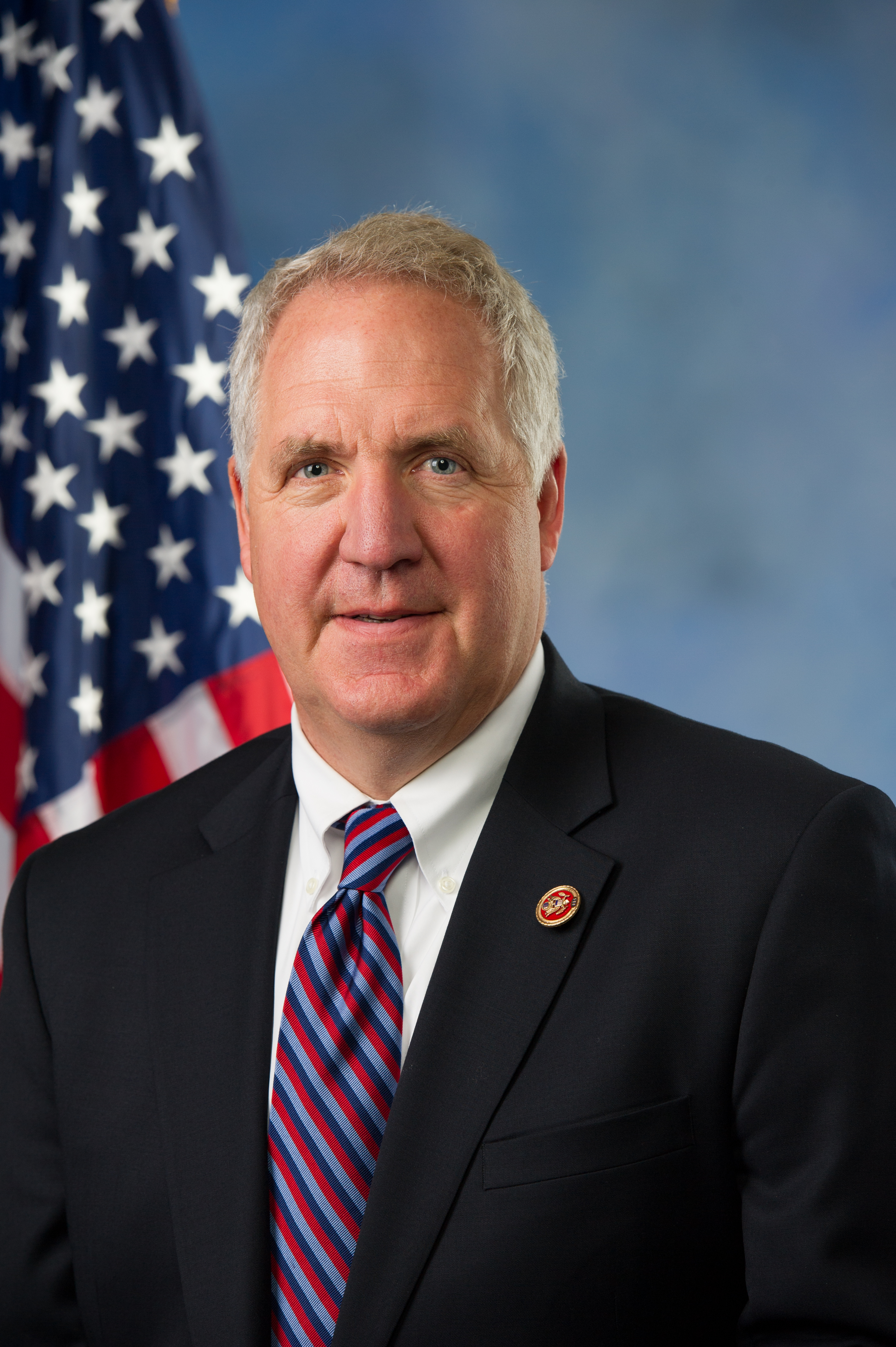
John Shimkus (R-IL)

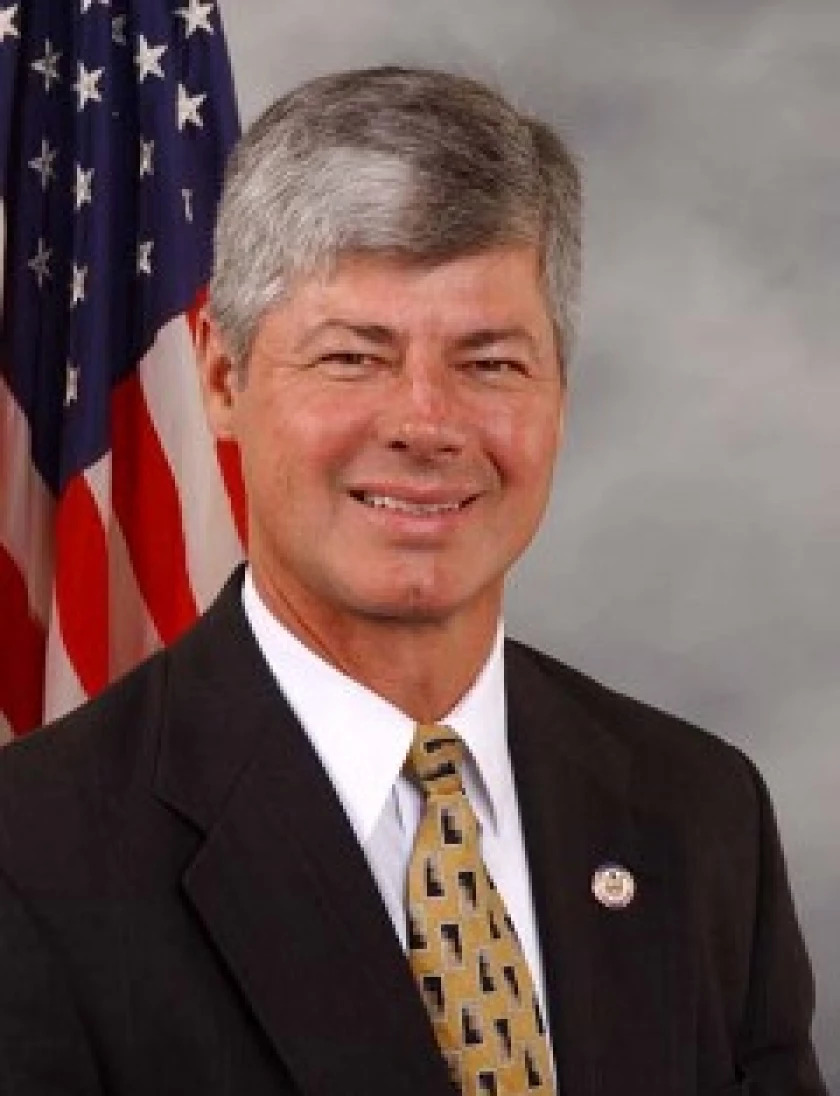
Bart Stupak (D-MI)

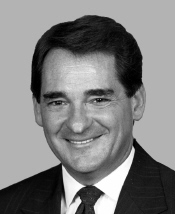
Billy Tauzin (R-LA)

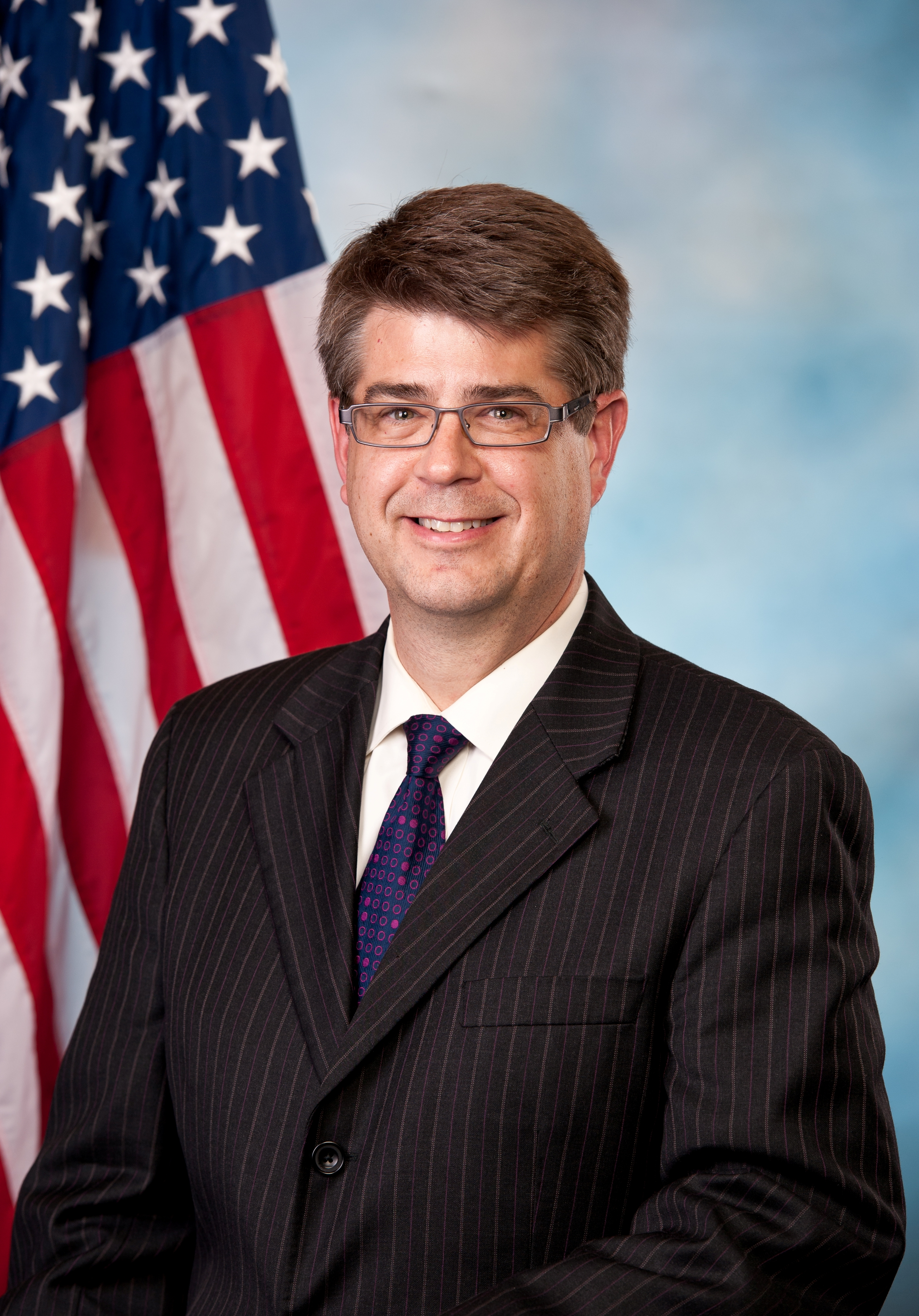
Lee Terry (R-NE)

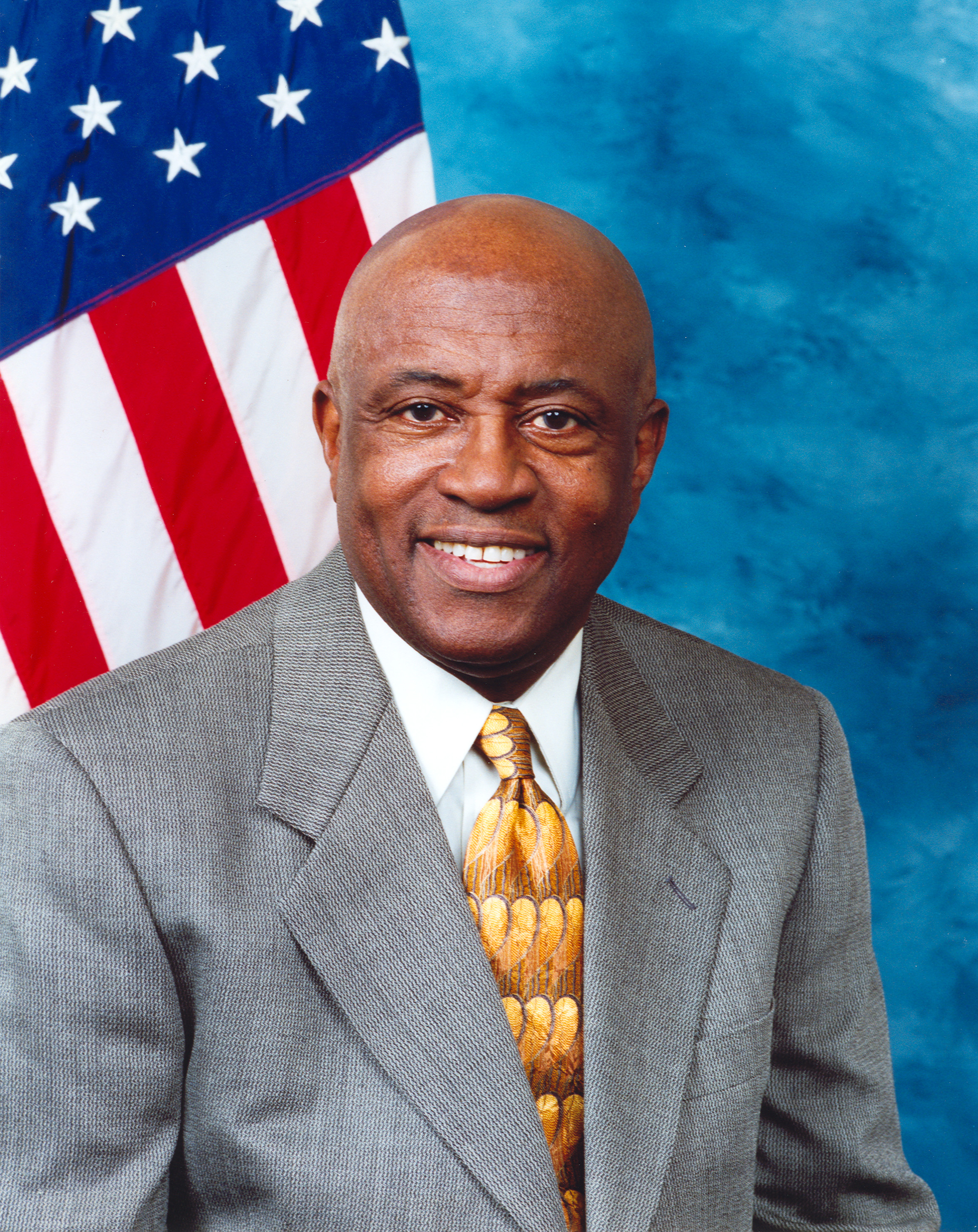
Edolphus Towns (D-NY)

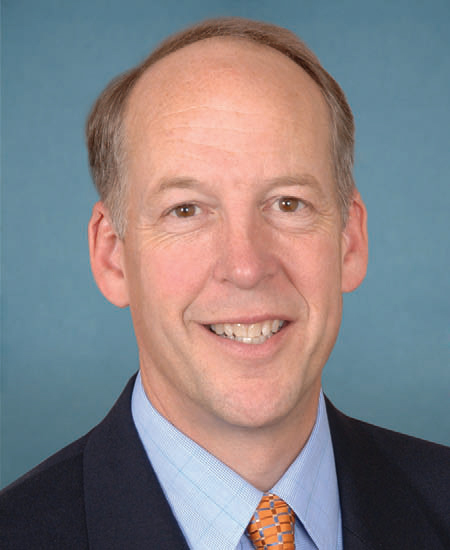
Greg Walden (R-OR)

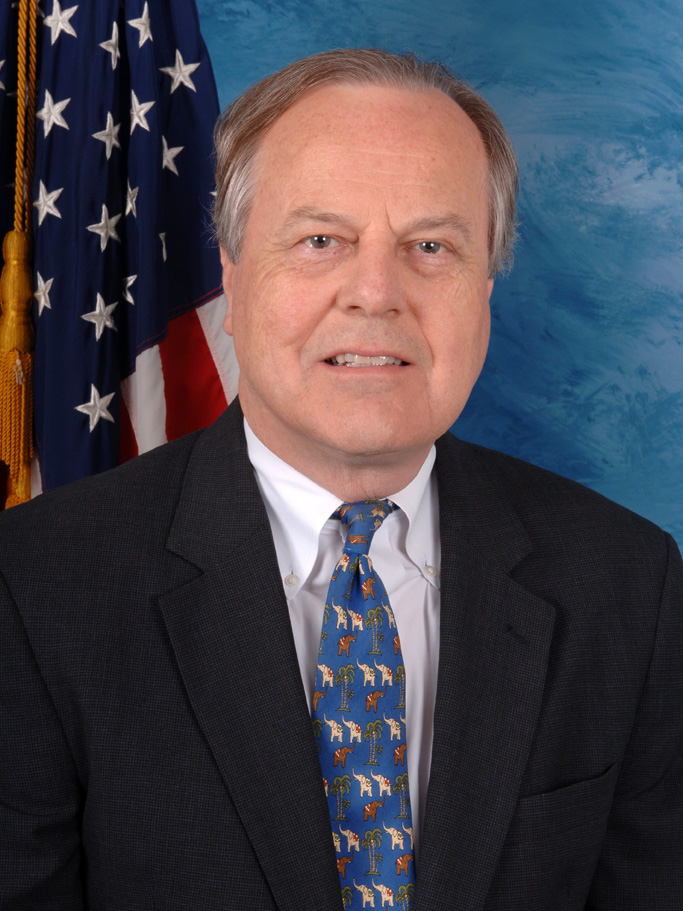
Ed Whitfield (R-KY)

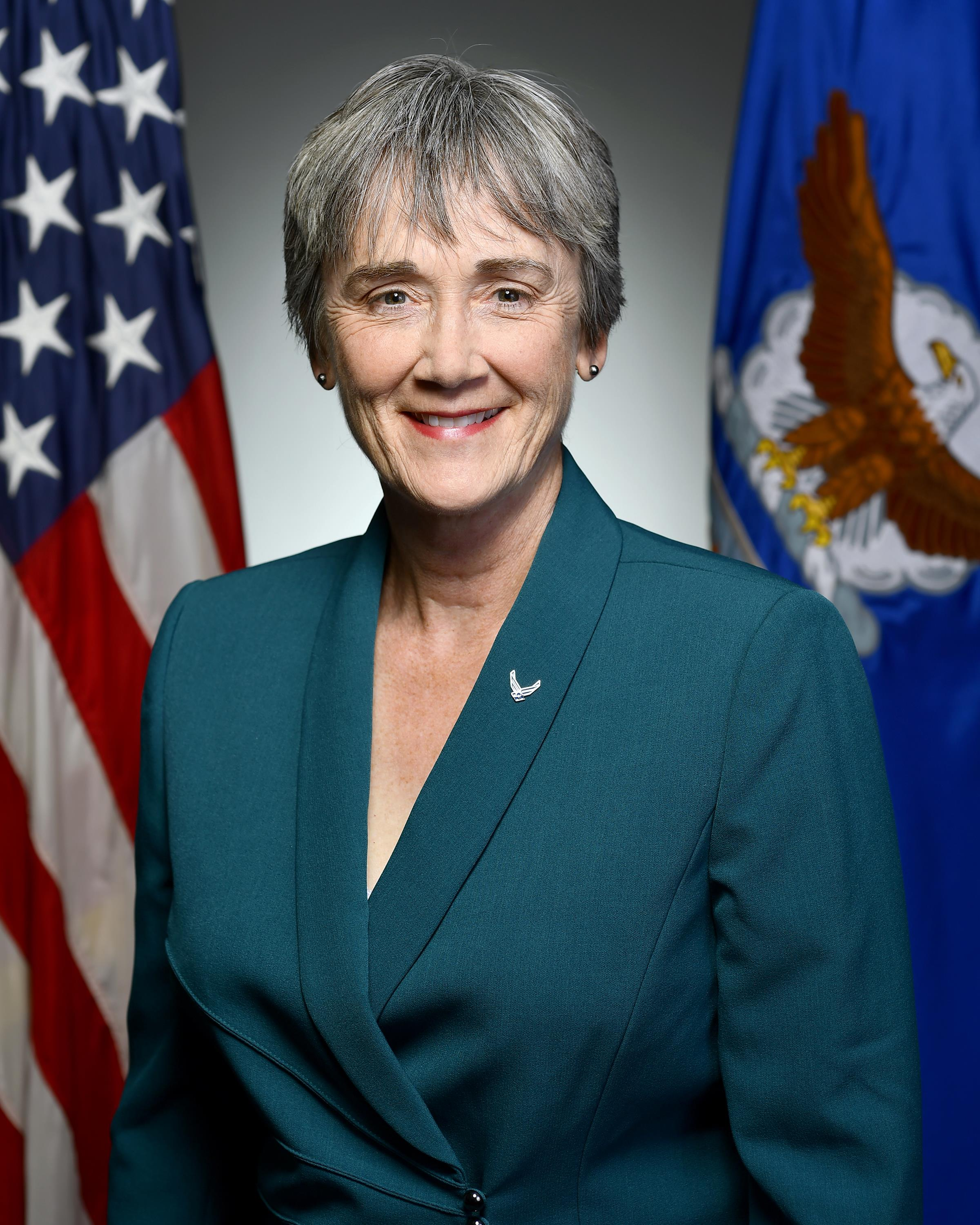
Heather Wilson (R-NM)

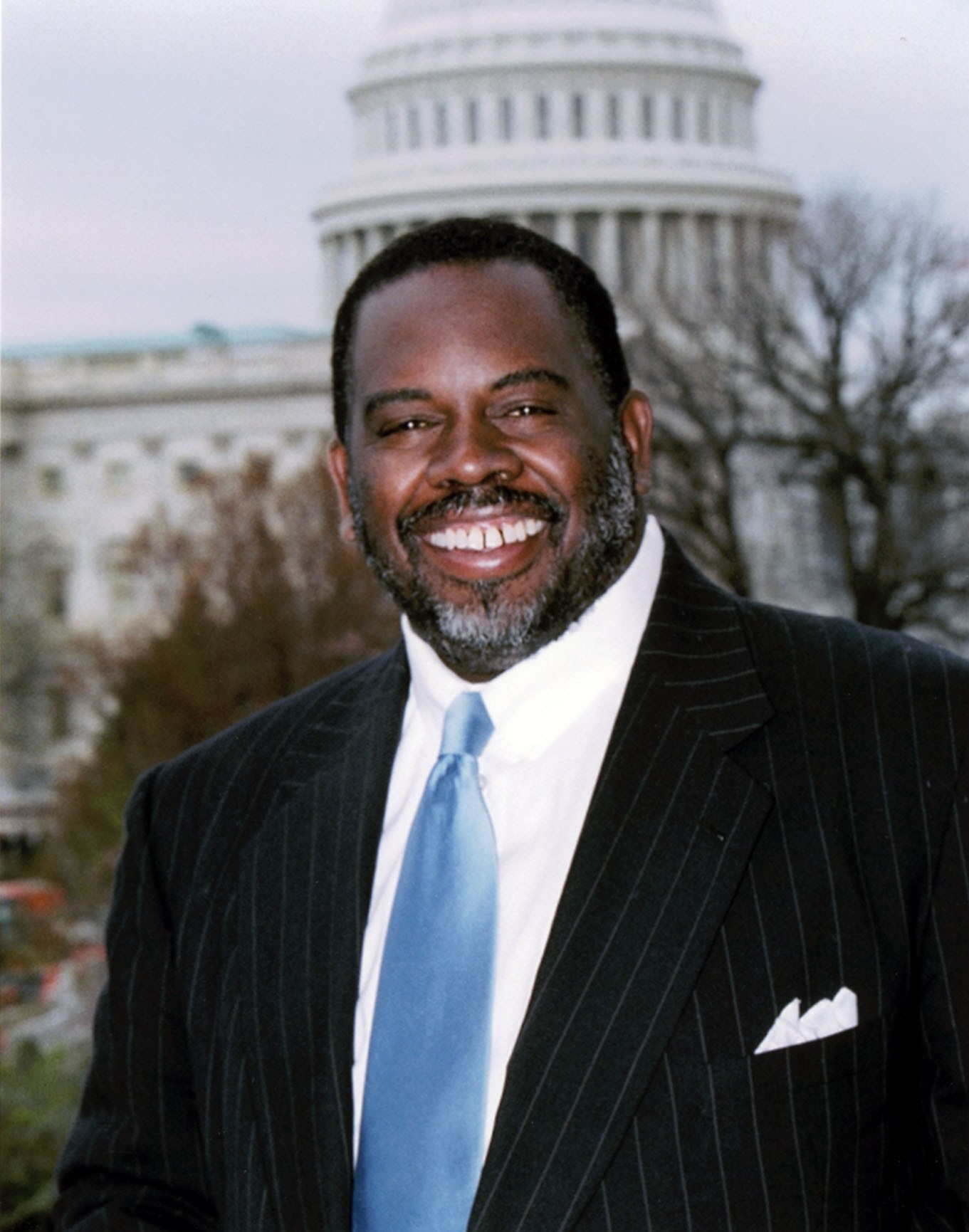
Albert Wynn (R-MD)

== See also ==
- Shock jock
