= Malfunction: The Dressing Down of Janet Jackson =

2021 film directed by Jodi Gomes

Malfunction: The Dressing Down of Janet Jackson is a 2021 American documentary television film directed by Jodi Gomes and produced by Left/Right.

== Summary ==
The film focuses on the Super Bowl XXXVIII halftime show controversy in which Justin Timberlake partially exposed American singer Janet Jackson's breast during Timberlake and Jackson's live performance at the end of the halftime show, resulting in substantial backlash against Jackson.

== Reception ==
The documentary premiered on November 19, 2021 as an episode of The New York Times Presents. The film was reviewed positively by IndieWire.

== Accolades ==
Outstanding Arts, Culture or Entertainment Coverage - News and Documentary Emmy Awards (won)
