= Janet Jackson filmography =

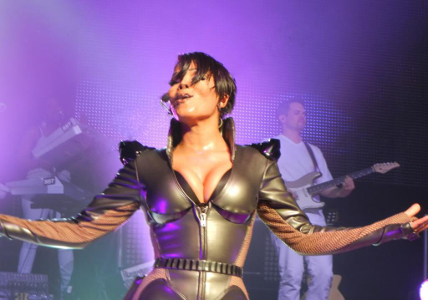
Jackson performing on tour

American recording artist Janet Jackson has appeared in various films and television shows. She began her career as a child star in the sitcoms Good Times, Diff'rent Strokes, A New Kind of Family and Fame. Jackson then starred in her debut film Poetic Justice (1993), directed by John Singleton. She portrayed Justice, who copes with her mother's suicide and boyfriend's murder through writing poetry. It opened at number one at the box office and has been considered iconic within popular culture. Throughout the decade, Jackson was initially cast in leading roles in several films, including Jerry Maguire (1996), The Matrix (1999), Scream 3 (2000), and X-Men (2000), but was unable to proceed with filming due to scheduling conflicts while touring. Additionally, she was considered for the role of Lena Horne, but was asked to step down, following the Super Bowl controversy. She was also set to star in Valley of the Dolls, Newlyweds, and Tennessee, but could not commit to those acting roles due to focusing on her music career.

Jackson's first three films have opened at number one, with her following two opening within the top three. She also has a minimum of three films to debut at number one on the DVD and Blu-ray charts, selling one to two million copies within their first week. Her film performances have garnered numerous accolades, which include MTV Movie Awards and Image Awards. Her film compositions have also received recognition, including Academy Award and Golden Globe nominations for "Best Original Song from a Motion Picture". Critics have considered Jackson among the few child stars to successfully transition into a credible actress. She is also thought to have one of the most notorious film careers by a musician. Throughout her career, she has also filmed advertisements for Pepsi, Jaguar, Japan Airlines, KDDI, and The Trevor Project, among others.

Jackson began her career as a child star, performing a series of successful television roles before starring in feature films. Jackson stated, "I love acting—it was my first love. I had my first job at seven. I got a recording contract when I was 14, so I thought I was going to be an actress." Joan Morgan ultimately declared Jackson "a veteran thespian who also happened to sell more than 100 million records." DeMarco Williams placed Jackson among the few child stars who successfully transitioned into adult actors, along with Jodie Foster, Ron Howard, and Drew Barrymore. Ria Nevada observed her acting work to track Jackson's evolution, "from the 'girl next door' to sex-goddess, to the strong, powerful woman she is today." Of her standard acting rates, Phillip McCarthy declared her a "$3-million per-picture screen queen." Jackson has had three consecutive films open at number one, beginning with her debut role in Poetic Justice, and two additional films enter the top three. She also had a minimum of three consecutive films debut at number one on the DVD and Blu-ray charts, selling over one to two million copies within their first week.

Jackson made her film debut in Poetic Justice, directed by John Singleton. Jackson's character, Justice, finds romance after her mother's suicide and boyfriend's murder, writing poetry to cope with her pain. Her love interest, Lucky, is played by Tupac Shakur, considered an "unlikely but effective pairing." Although advised to do a musical, Jackson accepted the role to further unveil an edgier and rebellious image, in contrast to her formerly innocent persona. It removed her from her comfort zone, opting for a "harder exterior and a rougher neck." It opened at number one, with its cult significance considered to have "dominated the 90s." Diane E. Picard commended its plot, which "captures the sense of desperation felt by a young woman struggling with strong emotions and nowhere to turn." It was also declared "a surprising movie about coming of age in a time of violence and hatred." Several critics considered it a "classic" and iconic, in addition to one of the most notorious film debuts by a musician.

Jackson played Professor Denise Gaines in The Nutty Professor II: The Klumps, opposite Eddie Murphy. Brian Grazer stated, "she's a superstar musician who acts. Getting Janet is a huge coup for us because she doesn't have to do movies, but she wants to do this one." Murphy commented, "I've known for years that she's a good actress. [...] She's a superstar and a really talented woman... It was like 'Wow, I'm with a superstar on the set.'" It opened at number one and grossed $175 million worldwide, also being the biggest opening week of Murphy's career. Jackson received praise among critics for her portrayal. Melissa Marschheuser of The Sentinel stated "she plays the role perfectly", while Variety commended her "improbable persuasiveness."

Jackson played Dr. Patricia Agnew in her third film, Why Did I Get Married?. Patrick Huguenin described her role as "a picture-perfect (but emotionally scarred) romance psychologist who corrals her now-married college friends into an annual retreat." Variety considered Jackson's presence to ensure its success. It opened at number one, grossing nearly $60 million worldwide. She also starred in Why Did I Get Married Too?, reprising her role as a "demurely clothed, deeply sentient, highly respected psychologist." It opened at number two, grossing over $60 million. A third sequel, Why Did I Get Married Again?, would have Jackson play the love interest of Dwayne "The Rock" Johnson. Jackson then co-starred in the drama For Colored Girls, an adaption of the stage play For Colored Girls Who Have Considered Suicide / When the Rainbow Is Enuf. She portrayed Joanna, an abrasive fashion editor. It debuted at number three, with an intake of nearly $40 million.

In 2011, Jackson entered a production deal with Lionsgate, in collaboration with her company JDJ Entertainment. Michael Paseornek stated, "She is a powerful on-screen presence, with a vast audience, and we believe she will be an equally powerful presence behind the scenes." Jackson desires to pursue films with "a lot of energy," saying, "I love action films, I love Sci-Fi."

== Filmography ==
=== Films ===
Year	Title	Role	Director(s)	Budget	Box office	Ref
Year	Title	Role	Director(s)	USD$ Worldwide		Ref
1993	Poetic Justice	Justice LaRue	John Singleton	$14 million	$27.5 million	
2000	Nutty Professor II: The Klumps	Professor Denise Gaines	Peter Segal	$65 million	$175 million	
2007	Why Did I Get Married?	Dr. Patricia Agnew	Tyler Perry	$15 million	$55.9 million	
2010	Why Did I Get Married Too?	Dr. Patricia Agnew	Tyler Perry	$20 million	$60.7 million	
2010	For Colored Girls	Joanna "Jo" Bradmore / Red	Tyler Perry	$19 million	$37.7 million	

=== Television ===
Year	Title	Role	Creator(s)	Episodes	Ref
1975	Cher	Herself	George Schlatter	1 episode (Season 1, episode 6)	
1976–77	The Jacksons	Herself		12 episodes	
1977–79	Good Times	Penny Gordon Woods	Eric Monte & Mike Evans	48 episodes	
1979	A New Kind of Family	Jojo Ashton	Bob Illes & James R. Stein	3 episodes	
1980–84	Diff'rent Strokes	Charlene DuPrey	Jeff Harris & Bernie Kukoff	10 episodes	
1984–85	Fame	Cleo Hewitt	Christopher Gore	7 episodes	
1985	The Love Boat	Delia Parks	Jeraldine Saunders	"Too Many Isaacs" (Season 8, episodes 19 & 20)	
1989	Rhythm Nation 1814	Herself	Janet Jackson & Dominic Sena	Televised musical short film based on the album of the same name	
2004	Saturday Night Live	Herself	Beth McCarthy-Miller	Host and musical guest; seven sketches (Season 29, episode 17)	
2004	Will & Grace	Herself	David Kohan & Max Mutchnick	"Back Up, Dancer" (Season 7, episode 2)	
2022	Janet Jackson	Herself	Janet Jackson & Randy Jackson	4 episodes	

=== Commercials and advertisements ===
Year	Sponsor	Notes	Ref
1984–85	National / Panasonic	Several Japanese dance ads promoting National Hi-Fi VCR; Select ad features remix of "Start Anew"	
1990	Japan Airlines	Televised ads for Japan Airlines' "Image-Up" campaign; Jackson performs "Escapade" and "Rhythm Nation"; Produced by CEI Productions	
1993	Virgin Records	Promotional ad aired prior to debut of "That's the Way Love Goes" music video; Jackson introduces dancers from behind camera's lens, including a then-unknown Jennifer Lopez	
1993–94	KDDI TU-KA	Five Japanese ads promoting KDDI TU-KA cell phones; Uses "Whoops Now"; Jackson speaks in Kansai dialect and performs Manzai in select ad	
1998	MTV	Promotional "Dance with Janet" contest for winner to appear on Jackson's Velvet Rope Tour; Features Jackson as various dancers perform her choreography to exclusive mash-up	
1998	HBO	Promotional commercial for HBO broadcast of The Velvet Rope Tour	
1998–99	Pepsi	Promotional ad for global Pepsi campaign; Features promotional single "Ask for More"; Directed by Peter Smillie in Sydney, Australia; Alternate versions include Jackson with Ricky Martin (South America) and Aaron Kwok (Asia); Spanish version of "Ask for More" recorded with Ricky Martin	
2001	MTV Icon: Janet Jackson	Three promotional ads for Jackson's inaugural MTV Icon tribute; Features conservative families in shock over Jackson's music and videos; Directed by Melissa Silverman, edited by Nathan Byrne	
2001	Jaguar X-Type	Promotional ad for Jaguar X-Type aired in Japan and All for You Tour; Filmed during All for You Tour, sponsored by Jaguar and Clear Channel Entertainment; Directed by Dave Meyers and produced by Spike Lee	
2002	HBO	Promotional HBO ads for broadcast of Janet Jackson: Live in Hawaii; Features All for You Tour footage; Second ad features new footage and "Aloha" greeting	
2004	CBS	Promotional ad for Super Bowl XXXVIII halftime show; Aired during Fox NFL Sunday pregame show and prior to halftime show	
2004	BET	Series of ten ads for February's "History: Pass It On" campaign; Won silver Telly Award in Education category	
2008	MTV	Five ads shown during MTV's "Spankin' New Ladies Week"; Parodies of My Super Sweet Sixteen, The Real World, Making the Band 4, A Shot at Love with Tila Tequila, and Rob & Big; Jackson's first appearance on MTV in six years, following blacklisting from various networks due to the aftermath of her Super Bowl XXXVIII halftime incident; Filmed at Paramount Pictures in Los Angeles; Directed by Joel Schumacher, edited by Tim Kafalas	
2008	LOGO	Anti-hate public service announcement for Lawrence King	
2008	Nivea Cosmetics	Nivea ad promoting "Natural Tone" lotion; Uses "Rock With U" in sponsor of Jackson's Rock Witchu Tour; Does not feature Jackson	
2010	The Trevor Project	Public service announcement to LGBT youth for "It Gets Better" campaign	
2012	Nutrisystem	Promotional ads for Nutrisystem's "Success" program and "Get On It" campaign; Directed by Dave Meyers; Tour version directed by Jake Nava; In promotion with Nutribank, Jackson's campaign to solve world hunger; Launched with self-help book True You: A Journey to Finding and Loving Yourself	
2012	amfAR	Public service announcement for World AIDS Day; Jackson honored at amfAR's New York Gala and co-chaired amfAR's Cinema Against AIDS XX in France the following year	
2013	UNICEF	Public service announcement for humanitarian assistance for world hunger relief	
