= Resorts World Theatre =

Theatre in Las Vegas, Nevada

- Interior of the theatre in 2022
- Interactive map of Resorts World Theatre
- Full name: The Theatre at Resorts World Las Vegas
- Address: 3000 South Las Vegas Boulevard; Las Vegas, Nevada, U.S.
- Location: Resorts World Las Vegas, Las Vegas Strip, Winchester
- Coordinates: 36°8′7.4394″N 115°10′0.12″W
- Owner: AEG Presents; Resorts World Las Vegas
- Operator: Concerts West
- Capacity: 5,000

Construction
- Groundbreaking: May 2015
- Opened: December 1, 2021; 4 years ago
- Cost: $125 million
- Architect: Scéno Plus

Website
- www.rwlasvegas.com/entertainment/

Resorts World Theatre is a theatre on the grounds of Resorts World Las Vegas in Winchester, Nevada. Since opening in December 2021, the venue primarily hosts concert residencies, and it has the capacity to host conventions and sporting events.

== Background ==
On June 24, 2021, Resorts World Las Vegas opened as the newest hotel and casino on the Las Vegas Strip in more than a decade. Upon the hotel's opening, the theatre remained closed, and it was supposed to open with a Celine Dion concert on November 5, 2021. Dion's inaugural performance was ultimately cancelled due to medical issues, and the theatre opened on December 1, 2021, with a Carrie Underwood concert. Since opening, the venue has hosted concert residencies by Katy Perry and Luke Bryan, among other limited engagements.

The venue is a joint development between Resorts World Las Vegas and AEG Presents, and it is exclusively operated by Concerts West.

=== Technical aspects ===
The 4,700-seat theatre was designed by Scéno Plus, a world-renowned entertainment design firm based out of Montreal. The 13,550-square-foot stage is one of the largest on the Las Vegas Strip, measuring 64-foot deep by 196-foot wide. The proscenium opening measures 123-feet wide by 50-feet tall, and features a motorized system to adjust the opening size. The theatre also features a 576-square-foot stage lift that can sustain up to 86,400 pounds, and almost 5,000 square feet of customizable LED screens. The audio system at the venue is equipped by L-Acoustics, and features an estimated 267 speakers that create a "multi-dimensional surround sound experience." The "intimate" theatre features unobstructed sightlines with the furthest seat being only 150 feet from the stage.

== Performance history ==
=== Concert residencies ===
| Performer | Show | Length | Number of shows |
|---|---|---|---|
| Carrie Underwood | Reflection | December 1, 2021–April 12, 2025 | 72 |
| Katy Perry | Play | December 29, 2021–November 4, 2023 | 80 |
| Luke Bryan | Luke Bryan: Vegas | February 11, 2022–January 6, 2024 | 48 |
| Janet Jackson | Janet Jackson: Las Vegas | December 30, 2024–September 20, 2025 | 22 |
