= Janet Jackson: Las Vegas =

2024–2025 concert residency by Janet Jackson

- Residency by Janet Jackson
- Location: Winchester, Nevada, U.S.
- Venue: Resorts World Theatre
- Start date: December 30, 2024
- End date: September 20, 2025
- No. of shows: 22

Janet Jackson concert chronology
- Janet Jackson: Together Again (2023–2024); Janet Jackson: Las Vegas (2024–2025); Janet Jackson Japan 2026 (2026)

Janet Jackson: Las Vegas was a concert residency by the American singer Janet Jackson. Held at Resorts World Theatre on the Las Vegas Strip in Winchester, Nevada, the show opened on December 30, 2024, and closed on September 20, 2025, consisting of twenty-two shows.

== Background and development ==
On August 21, 2024, Jackson announced her return to Las Vegas with ten performances at Resorts World Theatre from December 30, 2024, through February 15, 2025. These performances are Jackson's first public shows in Las Vegas since her previous residency, Metamorphosis, at the Park Theater in 2019. Ticket sales began on August 28, 2024. On January 14, 2025, six additional shows for May of the same year were announced. Ticket sales began on January 19, 2025. In May 2025, additional concerts were revealed by Resorts World Las Vegas, extending the residency through September of the same year; Jackson later announced the shows on her social media.

== Set list ==
This set list is from the December 30, 2024, concert. It may not represent all concerts for the residency.

1. "Night"
2. "2nite"
3. "Rock with U"
4. "Throb"
5. "All Nite (Don't Stop)"
6. "Go Deep"
7. "Got 'til It's Gone"
8. "That's the Way Love Goes"
9. "Love Will Never Do (Without You)"
10. "Twenty Foreplay"
11. "I Want You"
12. interlude ("Promise of You", "After You Fall" and "Interlude: Twisted Elegance")
13. "Velvet Rope"
14. "All for You"
15. "Alright"
16. "Escapade"
17. "Miss You Much"
18. "So Excited" (So So Def remix) (Note: The "So So Def remix" of "So Excited" features Fatman Scoop)
19. "Feedback"
20. "Truth"
21. "Funny How Time Flies (When You're Having Fun)"
22. "Come Back to Me"
23. "Let's Wait Awhile"
24. "I Get Lonely"
25. "With U"
26. "Dream Maker" / "Euphoria"
27. "What Have You Done for Me Lately"
28. "Nasty"
29. "The Pleasure Principle"
30. "You Want This"
31. "When I Think of You"
32. "Young Love"
33. "Control"
34. "Son of a Gun (I Betcha Think This Song Is About You)"
35. "Lessons Learned"
36. "Trust a Try"
37. "The Knowledge"
38. "If"
39. "You"
40. "Scream" (contains elements of "If" and "Black Cat")
41. "Black Cat"
42. "Rhythm Nation"
43. "Together Again"
44. "Better Days"

== Shows ==
List of concerts
Date	City	Country	Venue	Attendance	Revenue
December 30, 2024	Las Vegas	United States	Resorts World Theatre	—	—
December 31, 2024	Las Vegas	United States	Resorts World Theatre	—	—
January 3, 2025	Las Vegas	United States	Resorts World Theatre	—	—
January 4, 2025	Las Vegas	United States	Resorts World Theatre	—	—
February 5, 2025	Las Vegas	United States	Resorts World Theatre	—	—
February 7, 2025	Las Vegas	United States	Resorts World Theatre	—	—
February 8, 2025	Las Vegas	United States	Resorts World Theatre	—	—
February 12, 2025	Las Vegas	United States	Resorts World Theatre	—	—
February 14, 2025	Las Vegas	United States	Resorts World Theatre	—	—
February 15, 2025	Las Vegas	United States	Resorts World Theatre	—	—
May 21, 2025	Las Vegas	United States	Resorts World Theatre	—	—
May 24, 2025	Las Vegas	United States	Resorts World Theatre	—	—
May 25, 2025	Las Vegas	United States	Resorts World Theatre	—	—
May 28, 2025	Las Vegas	United States	Resorts World Theatre	—	—
May 30, 2025	Las Vegas	United States	Resorts World Theatre	—	—
May 31, 2025	Las Vegas	United States	Resorts World Theatre	—	—
September 10, 2025	Las Vegas	United States	Resorts World Theatre	—	—
September 13, 2025	Las Vegas	United States	Resorts World Theatre	—	—
September 14, 2025	Las Vegas	United States	Resorts World Theatre	—	—
September 17, 2025	Las Vegas	United States	Resorts World Theatre	—	—
September 19, 2025	Las Vegas	United States	Resorts World Theatre	—	—
September 20, 2025	Las Vegas	United States	Resorts World Theatre	—	—
