= Back Up, Dancer =

- Will & Grace episode
- Scene where Jack (Sean Hayes; right) and Artemus (Will Arnett; left) compete in a dance-off to determine who will be Janet Jackson's fifth dancer.
- Episode no.: Season 7 Episode 2
- Directed by: James Burrows
- Written by: Tracy Poust; Jon Kinnally
- Original air date: September 23, 2004

Guest appearances
- Will Arnett as Artemus; Bobby Cannavale as Vince; Janet Jackson as herself

Episode chronology
← Previous "FYI: I Hurt, Too"	Next → "One Gay at a Time"
- Will & Grace season 7

"Back Up, Dancer" is the second episode of the seventh season of the American television series Will & Grace. It was written by Tracy Poust and Jon Kinnally and directed by series producer James Burrows. The episode originally aired on NBC in the United States on September 23, 2004. Guest stars in "Back Up, Dancer" include Will Arnett, Bobby Cannavale, and Janet Jackson.

In the episode, Jack (Sean Hayes) auditions to be a backup dancer for singer Janet Jackson, but in order to get the job, he must compete in a dance-off with a fellow named Artemus (Arnett). Meanwhile, Will (Eric McCormack) is torn between going out with his boyfriend Vince (Cannavale) and staying in to console Grace (Debra Messing) following her failed marriage.

"Back Up, Dancer" received generally mixed reviews from television critics, some of whom disliked Jackson's appearance on the show. According to Nielsen, the episode was watched by 15.32 million households during its original broadcast, and received a 7.1 rating/19 share among viewers in the 18–49 demographic.

== Plot ==
At the beginning of the episode Jack (Sean Hayes) learns he will have an audition to be a backup dancer for singer Janet Jackson. The audition was set up by singer Jennifer Lopez, whom Jack worked for in the same position after Lopez let him go. At the audition, Jackson decides that she would like five dancers instead of the six originally planned. Jack, "the newbie," and Artemus (Will Arnett), "the guy who's been here the longest," compete in a dance-off to determine the fifth dancer. Before the dance-off, Karen (Megan Mullally)—Jack's friend—visits to support her friend. She sees Artemus and reveals to Jack the two are former lovers. The two get back together which outrages Jack. Karen reassures Jack that their reconciliation will not affect him in any way, only for her to tell Jack to lose the dance-off. Jack tells Karen he will not throw the competition. During the dance-off, Karen pleads with Jack to lose which Jack ultimately does. Believing he won, Artemus tells Karen he used her to win. After deciding that she only needs four dancers, Jackson fires both Jack and Artemus. At the end, Karen apologizes to Jack for getting him fired.

Meanwhile, Grace (Debra Messing) copes with her failed marriage to Leo (Harry Connick, Jr.). She tries to move on, but mementos of the past do not let her. Her best friend Will (Eric McCormack) tries to help her but to no avail. While at dinner with his boyfriend Vince (Bobby Cannavale), and Vince's superior officer, Grace calls him, displeasing Vince. Believing that Grace might be suicidal, Will leaves to attend to her. Vince shows up at Will and Grace's apartment to confront her, telling her that she is affecting his relationship with Will because she is too needy. This prompts Grace and Vince to bicker, with the two asking Will to choose between them. He cannot choose between them as Grace is his long-time friend, but he also cares for Vince. The episode concludes with him telling Vince that he wants to work things out, but before they can discuss it, Vince sees Grace's wedding album, resulting in him being more focused on the album than the relationship.

== Production ==
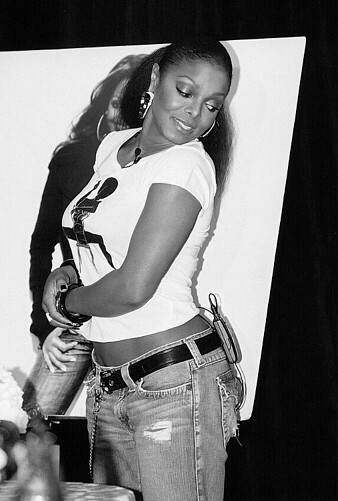
Janet Jackson guest starred in the episode. Her appearance received mixed reviews from critics.

"Back Up, Dancer" was written by Tracy Poust and Jon Kinnally and directed by series producer James Burrows. It originally aired on NBC in the United States on September 23, 2004. It was confirmed in mid-2004 that singer Janet Jackson would guest star as herself on the television series Will & Grace. She recorded her lines in front of a live audience on August 17. Jackson's role in the show had been her first television acting role in nearly two decades. Jackson's last prime-time role was on NBC's Fame. She also appeared in the television shows Diff'rent Strokes and Good Times. In addition, Jackson's appearance came nine months after the Super Bowl XXXVIII halftime show controversy. She told the entertainment news program Access Hollywood that she was a "big fan" of the show, and that she could not wait to join the cast for her stint. Also in this interview, she believed that Sean Hayes, who plays Jack, was a decent dancer. "I thought he studied dance. I really did, It's so funny. I have to catch myself because I'm cracking up in rehearsals. It's just funny to watch [the actors]." Jackson "had a tough time" on the set because she constantly messed up her lines. She admitted that it was not as easy as she had hoped it would be. "I flubbed my lines and got so frustrated when I made those mistakes. I haven't done TV since Different Strokes, and it's not like Saturday Night Live where you can read cue cards. On Will & Grace, they're always rewriting, so you're always memorising." Jackson, however, said that the dancing was the "easy part of playing myself".

It was also announced that actor Will Arnett would guest star, as Jack's dance rival. Alex Herschlag, executive producer of Will & Grace, revealed Arnett's subplot in the episode, saying that Hayes and Arnett are "vying for a job as Janet Jackson's backup dancer." In an online chat session with the Los Angeles Times, Arnett revealed that the reason for his guest spot was due to knowing one of the writers of the show, and Arnett being friends with Hayes. In an April 2007 interview with The Advocate, Arnett said that he enjoyed doing his guest spot on the show.

== Reception ==
According to the Nielsen system, "Back Up, Dancer" was watched by 15.32 million households in its original American broadcast. The episode received a 7.1 rating/19 share among viewers in the 18–49 demographic, and was the eighth highest-rated show on the NBC network that week. "Back Up, Dancer" finished in 13th place in the weekly ratings for the week of September 20–26, 2004. Since airing the episode has received mixed reviews from television critics.

In preview of the episode, Phil Rosenthal of the Chicago Sun-Times said: "If you're going to book a former cast member from Good Times as a guest for your sitcom, do yourself a favor and try getting Jimmie Walker, John Amos or Ja'net Dubois before settling for Janet Jackson." Scott D. Pierce of Deseret News reported that Jackson's appearance "takes the focus off the regular characters" while Mark Harris of Entertainment Weekly commented that Jackson's guest spot "was an all-time low".

Gary Susman of Entertainment Weekly was complimentary towards Jackson, concluding that she was "all business, playing it straight" in the episode. He reported that "she makes a fabulous entrance and departs with her dignity intact". Charleston Daily Mail contributor Kevin McDonough wrote that in the season premiere episode "FYI: I Hurt, Too" of season seven, singer Jennifer Lopez appeared "in a farfetched and laugh-free guest appearance. Tonight ['Back Up, Dancer'], it's Janet Jackson's turn. At least she has sitcom experience." In her annual countdown of the best quotes of 2004, Amy Amatangelo of Knight Ridder included Will Arnett's line "Like a Sicilian woman's eyebrows, we could not be kept apart". In March 2006, Entertainment Weekly named Jackson's guest spot as their number nine most memorable guest appearance on Will & Grace.
