= Janet Jackson Japan 2026 =

2026 concert tour by Janet Jackson

- Tour by Janet Jackson
- Promotional poster for the tour
- Location: Japan
- Start date: June 9, 2026
- End date: June 17, 2026
- No. of shows: 4

Janet Jackson concert chronology
- Janet Jackson: Las Vegas (2024–2025); Janet Jackson Japan 2026 (2026)

Janet Jackson Japan 2026 was the eleventh concert tour by the American singer Janet Jackson, scheduled for four arena performances in Japan in June 2026. The concerts were announced on February 18, 2026, and were billed as an "original" program created specifically for Japanese audiences.

== Announcements ==
On February 18, 2026, Any Co., Ltd. announced the four-date series under the title Janet Jackson Japan 2026 as a Japan-only special concert run. The announcement noted that Jackson’s prior Japan concerts in 2024 sold out, and positioned the 2026 dates as her return to Japan after roughly two years.

== Tour dates ==
List of 2026 concerts
Date (2026)	City	Country	Venue	Attendance	Revenue
June 9	Kobe	Japan	Glion Arena	—	—
June 13	Yokohama	Japan	K-Arena	—	—
June 14	Yokohama	Japan	K-Arena	—	—
June 17	Nagoya	Japan	IG Arena	—	—

== Broadcast ==
In July 2026, it was announced Wowow would broadcast and stream a recording of the tour. Filmed during the concerts at K-Arena and IG Arena, the broadcast will feature special guests Be First, Hana, and Shingo Katori. The special, billed as Janet Jackson Japan Tour 2026, is scheduled to air on September 26, 2026.
