= True You =

2011 book by Janet Jackson and David Ritz

True You: A Journey to Finding and Loving Yourself
- Author: Janet Jackson; David Ritz
- Language: English
- Genre: Self-help
- Publisher: Karen Hunter
- Publication date: February 15, 2011
- Publication place: United States
- Media type: Print (hardback)
- Pages: 256
- ISBN: 978-1-4165-8724-8

True You: A Journey to Finding and Loving Yourself is a self-help book co-authored by American singer Janet Jackson and biographer David Ritz, released on February 15, 2011. In the book, Jackson opens up about her struggles with food, body image, and relationships. It topped The New York Times Best Seller list in the Hardcover Advice and Misc. section the week of March 6, 2011.

== Background ==
Jackson's book deals with self-esteem, self-love, and how to feel good about one's body. Her book consists of personal anecdotes, pictures of her at different stages in her life, and an essay from her personal trainer combined with some of Janet's favorite recipes.

In an interview with USA Today, Jackson was candid about what would be included in the book, saying "I've had issues since I was a child. I wasn't heavy, but people made me feel like I was, I was told I needed to lose weight. And they'd bind my chest, because I already had breasts. At a young age, I was being told I wasn't good enough. So the book is about self-esteem as well".

The online media newspaper PopEater published an exclusive interview with Jackson involving the book. Talking about the writing process, she admitted "The whole book was difficult to write. I am a very private person. I guess I always have been, even as a child. I am not accustomed to revealing that much about myself." She also said that the goal of the book is to make people feel like they're "not alone".

== Reviews and performance ==
True You received a mixed review from The Washington Post. Author Michael Gross called the book a "mash-up of celebrity tell-nothing, dysfunction memoir and Oprah-ready self-help", complaining that the book lacked a structured narrative and suggesting that for people to really get to know Jackson "cue up Control or Janet Jackson's Rhythm Nation 1814".

The week of March 6, 2011, the book hit the number one spot on The New York Times Best Seller list's Hardcover Advice and Misc. section.

The book was sold at each stop of Jackson's Number Ones: Up Close and Personal tour in 2011.

== Previews ==
True you : a journey to finding and loving yourself : Jackson, Janet, 1966- : Free Download, Borrow, and Streaming : Internet Archive
