= Janet Jackson =

American singer, songwriter, and dancer (born 1966)

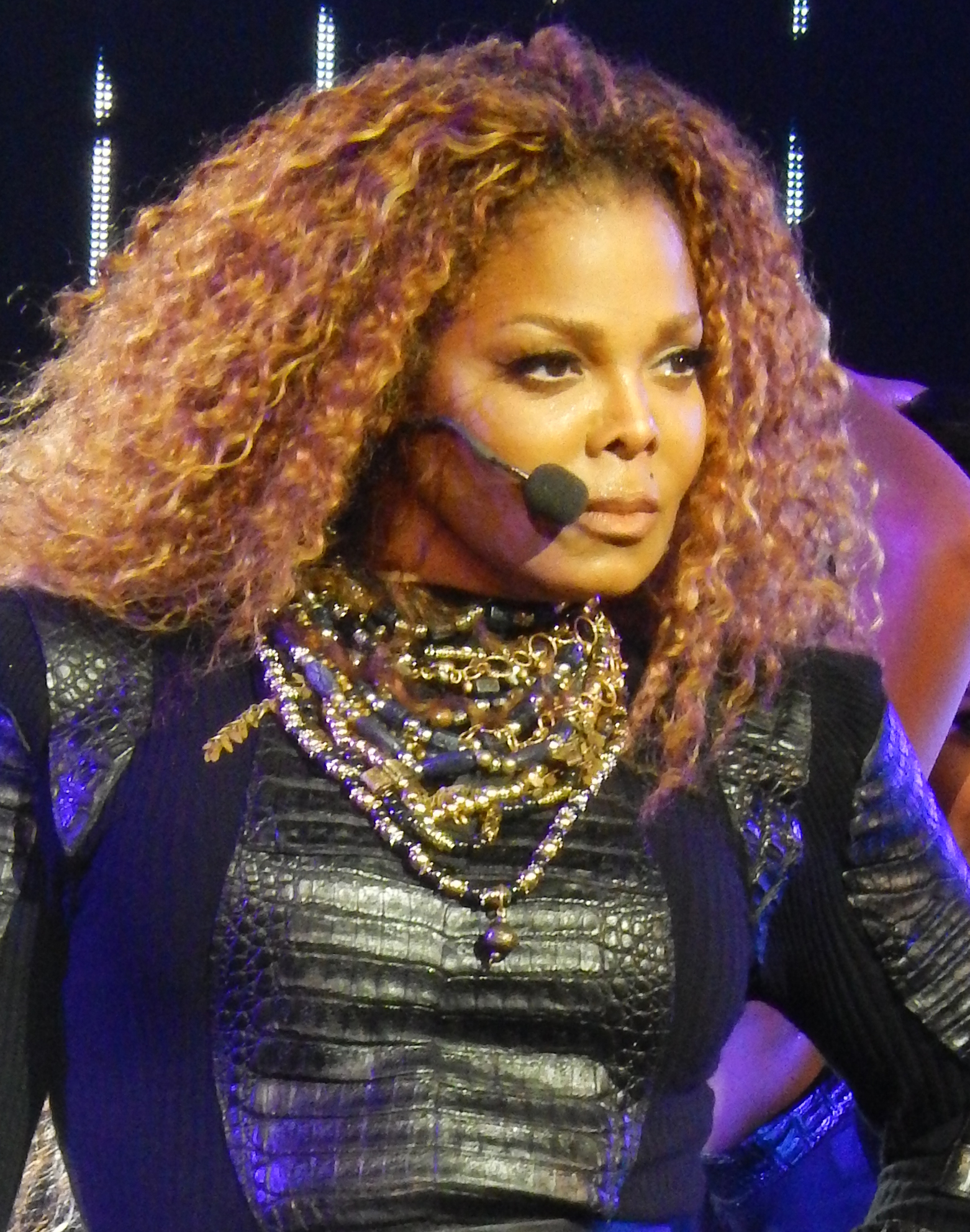
- Jackson in 2015
- Born: Janet Damita Jo Jackson; May 16, 1966 (age 60); Gary, Indiana, U.S.
- Occupations: Singer; songwriter; actress; dancer
- Years active: 1974–present
- Works: Albums; singles; videos; films
- Spouses: James DeBarge (m. 1984; ann. 1985); René Elizondo Jr. (m. 1991; div. 2003); Wissam Al Mana (m. 2012; sep. 2017)
- Partner: Jermaine Dupri (2002–2009)
- Children: 1
- Parents: Katherine Jackson; Joe Jackson
- Family: Jackson family
- Awards: Full list
- Musical career
- Genres: R&B; pop; dance; new jack swing
- Instruments: Vocals; keyboards
- Labels: A&M; Virgin; Island; Rhythm Nation; BMG; Cinq
- Publisher: Believe Music
- Website: janetjackson.com

Janet Damita Jo Jackson (born May 16, 1966) is an American singer, songwriter, actress, and dancer. An influential figure in popular culture, she is known for her innovative works that incorporate socially conscious and sexually provocative themes, as well as her elaborate stage shows. Her sound and choreography became a catalyst in the growth of MTV, breaking American gender and racial barriers and enabling her rise to prominence. Lyrical content that concerned social issues and deeply felt experiences contributed to the appeal of Jackson's work to the youth audience.

The tenth and youngest child of the Jackson family, Jackson was a child actress, starring in the television shows Good Times (1977–1979), Diff'rent Strokes (1980–1984) and Fame (1984–1985). After signing with A&M Records in 1982 and terminating business affairs with her family, she achieved global stardom with Control (1986) and Rhythm Nation 1814 (1989). The albums led to crossover success in popular music and influenced the development of the new jack swing fusion genre. In the 1990s, Jackson became one of the highest-paid musicians, signing two of the largest music deals of all time with Virgin Records. She cemented her sex symbol status with a leading role in the film Poetic Justice (1993), and the albums Janet (1993) and The Velvet Rope (1997).

Jackson achieved her tenth US number-one single with the title track from her seventh studio album, All for You (2001). Following the controversy surrounding her 2004 Super Bowl halftime show, Jackson experienced a career decline. She faced an industry blacklisting under the direction of Les Moonves, then-CEO of CBS, resulting in reduced radio airplay, televised promotion, and sales figures of her music catalog. The aftermath impacted the commercial performance of her eighth studio album, Damita Jo (2004). Over the next decades, Jackson continued to perform and release new music, including the studio albums 20 Y.O. (2006), Discipline (2008), and Unbreakable (2015). Her tenth concert tour, Together Again Tour (2023–2024), became the highest-grossing tour of her career.

Jackson is one of the best-selling music artists of all time, with estimated sales of over 100 million records. One of the highest-charting musicians in the history of the Billboard charts, she holds the record for the most consecutive top-ten entries on the US Billboard Hot 100 by a female artist (18) and remains the only artist in history to have seven singles from one album—Rhythm Nation 1814—peak within the top five positions. Her accolades include five Grammy Awards, 11 Billboard Music Awards, 11 American Music Awards, 10 MTV Video Music Awards, eight Guinness World Records entries, and an induction into the Rock and Roll Hall of Fame.

== Life and career ==
=== 1966–1985: Early life and career beginnings ===
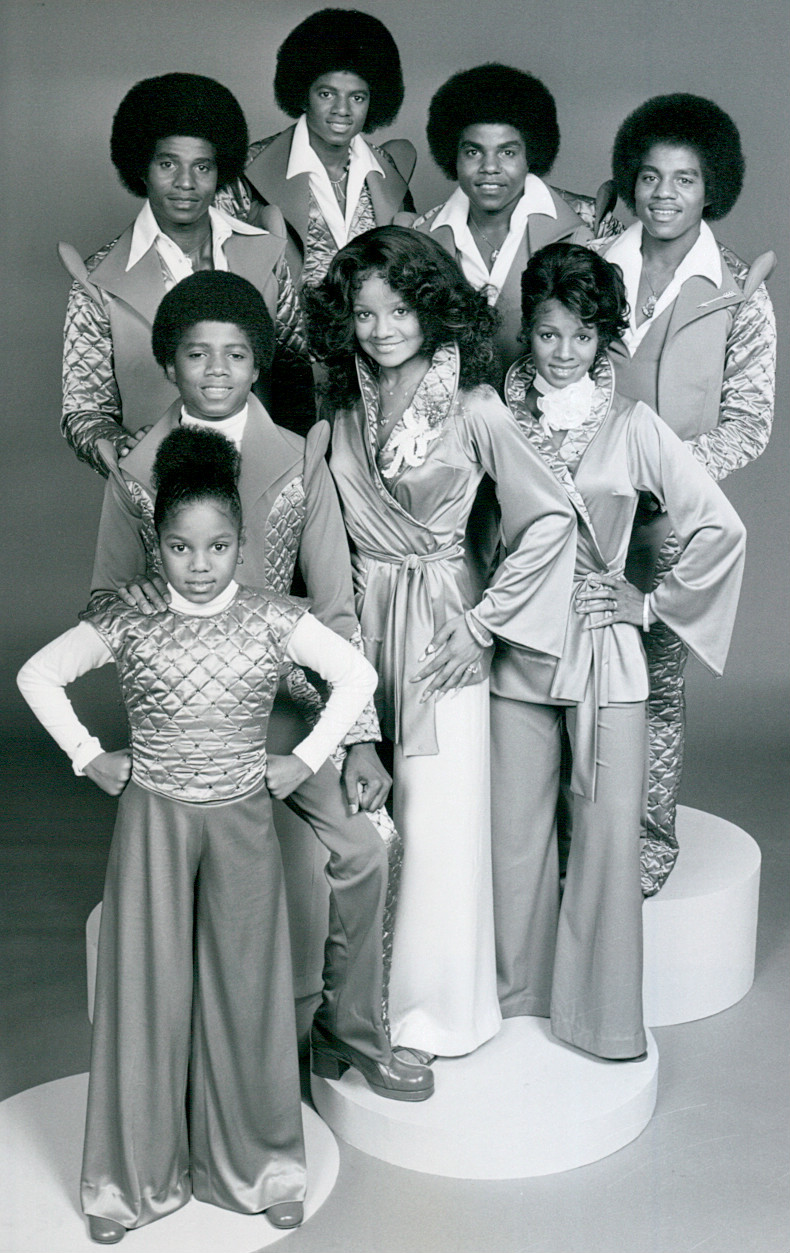
Jackson (bottom row) in a 1977 CBS photo on the set of The Jacksons

Janet Damita Jo Jackson was born on May 16, 1966, in Gary, Indiana. She was the youngest of ten children in the Jackson family, a working-class African-American family living in a two-bedroom house on Jackson Street. Her mother, Katherine Esther Jackson (née Scruse), played clarinet, cello, and piano, had aspired to be a country-and-western performer, and worked part-time at Sears. Her father, Joseph Walter "Joe" Jackson, a former boxer, was a crane operator at U.S. Steel and played guitar with a local rhythm and blues band, the Falcons, to supplement the family's income. Janet's great-great-grandfather, July "Jack" Gale, was a US Army scout. Family lore held that he was also a Native American medicine man. Janet grew up with two sisters (Rebbie and La Toya) and six brothers (Jackie, Tito, Jermaine, Marlon, Michael and Randy). Another brother, Marlon's twin Brandon, died shortly after birth. The Jacksons were devout Jehovah's Witnesses, although Janet would later refrain from organized religion.

At a young age, Jackson's brothers began performing as the Jackson 5 in the Chicago-Gary area. In March 1969, they signed a record deal with Motown, and soon had their first number-one hit. The family then moved to the Encino neighborhood of Los Angeles. Jackson had initially desired to become a horse racing jockey or entertainment lawyer, with plans to support herself through acting. Despite this, she was anticipated to pursue a career in entertainment and considered the idea after recording herself in the studio.

At age seven, Jackson and her sisters performed with the Jackson 5 for their revue at the MGM Casino on the Las Vegas Strip. A biography revealed her father, Joseph, was emotionally withdrawn and told her to address him solely by his first name as a child. She began acting in the variety show The Jacksons in 1976.

In 1977, she was selected to have a starring role as Penny Gordon Woods in the sitcom Good Times. She later starred in A New Kind of Family and later got a recurring role on Diff'rent Strokes, portraying Charlene Duprey from seasons three to six. Jackson also played the role of Cleo Hewitt during the fourth season of Fame, but expressed indifference towards the series, largely due to the emotional stress of her secret marriage to R&B singer James DeBarge. Jackson later elaborated on her time on the show in an interview with Anderson Cooper, revealing that the cast would occasionally play pranks on her, but she spoke fondly of them.

When Jackson was fifteen, her father and manager Joseph Jackson arranged a contract for her with A&M Records. Her debut album, Janet Jackson, was released in 1982. It was produced by Angela Winbush, René Moore, Bobby Watson of Rufus and Leon Sylvers III, and overseen by her father Joseph. It peaked at number 63 on the Billboard 200, and number six on the publication's R&B albums chart, receiving little promotion. The album appeared on the Billboard Top Black Albums of 1983, while Jackson herself was the highest-ranking female vocalist on the Billboard Year-End Black Album Artists.

At the 1983 American Music Awards, Jackson was seen wearing a hoop earring with a key attached to it. She explained that one of her chores at the Hayvenhurst family home was to clean the cages of the wild animals that Michael adopted. As she never used a keychain, she kept the cage key on a hoop earring. Since then, Jackson has worn variants of the hoop earring with key on her music videos and live performances. The hoop and key earring she used from 1987 to 1990 is currently on display at the National Museum of African American History and Culture.

Jackson's second album, Dream Street, was released two years later. Dream Street reached number 147 on the Billboard 200, and number 19 on the R&B albums chart. The lead single "Don't Stand Another Chance" peaked at number nine on Billboard's R&B singles chart. Both albums consisted primarily of bubblegum pop music.

=== 1986–1988: Control ===
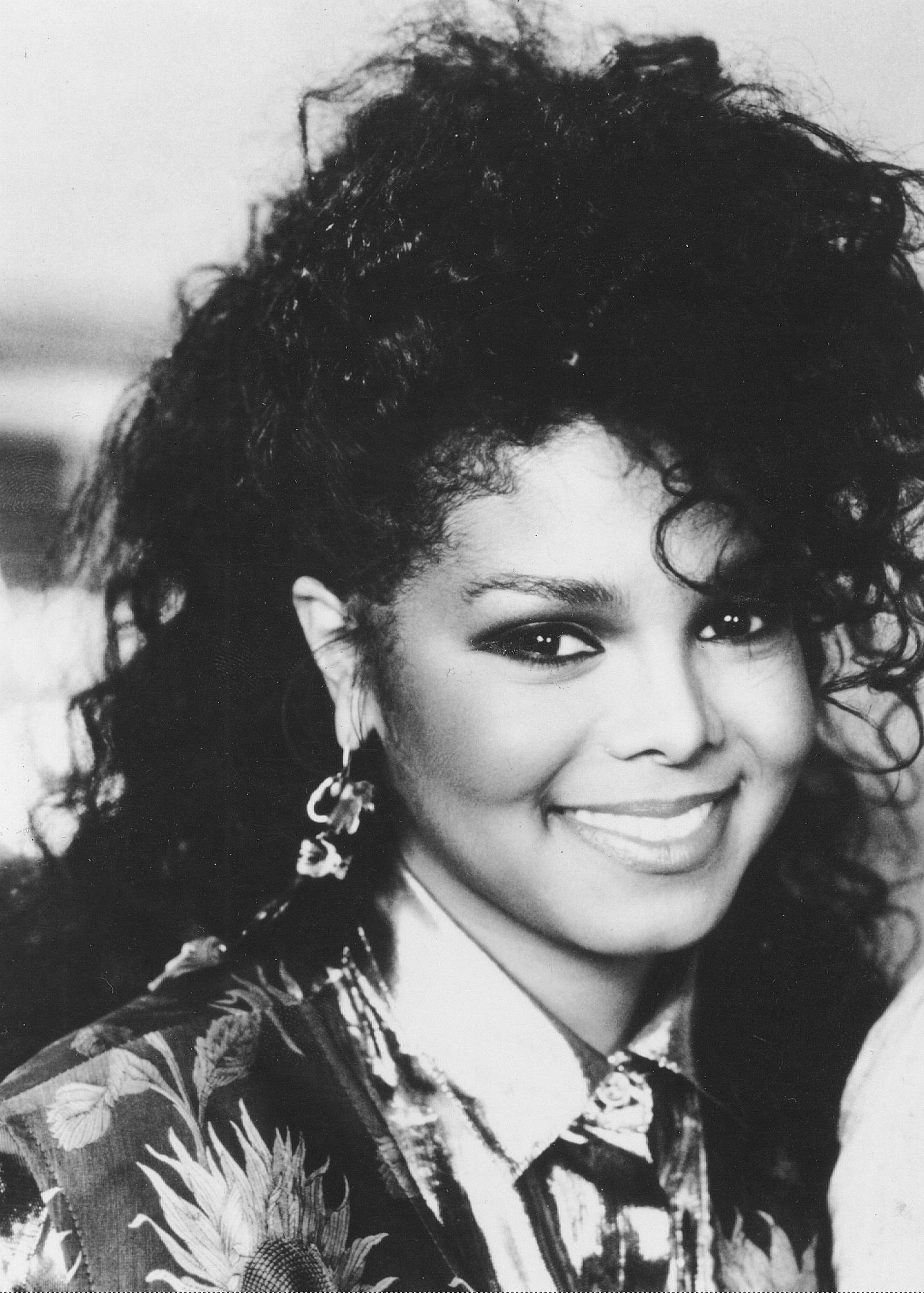
Janet Jackson in 1986

After her second album, Jackson terminated business affairs with her family, commenting "I just wanted to get out of the house, get out from under my father, which was one of the most difficult things that I had to do." Attempting a third album, Jackson teamed with producers Jimmy Jam and Terry Lewis. They set out to achieve crossover pop appeal, while also creating a strong foundation within the urban market. Within six weeks, Jackson and the duo crafted her third studio album, Control, released in February 1986. The album shot to number one on the Billboard 200, and was certified fivefold Platinum by the Recording Industry Association of America (RIAA), selling over ten million copies worldwide.

Control was declared "remarkably nervy and mature" for a teenage act, also considered "an alternative to the sentimental balladry" which permeated radio, likening Jackson to Donna Summer's position of "unwilling to accept novelty status and taking her own steps to rise above it." The album spawned five top five singles, "What Have You Done for Me Lately", "Nasty", "When I Think of You", "Control", and "Let's Wait Awhile", and a top 15 hit with "The Pleasure Principle". "When I Think of You" became her first number one hit on the Hot 100. Control received six Billboard Awards, including "Top Pop Singles Artist", and three Grammy nominations, such as Album of the Year. It also won three American Music Awards from twelve nominations.

At this point, Jackson was successfully "shaking off the experience of being a shadow Jackson child", becoming "an artist in her own right". The album's lyrical content included several themes of empowerment, inspired by an incident of sexual harassment, with Jackson recalling "the danger hit home when a couple of guys started stalking me on the street and instead of running to Jimmy or Terry for protection, I took a stand. I backed them down. That's how songs like 'Nasty' and 'What Have You Done for Me Lately' were born, out of a sense of self-defense."

Its innovative fusion of dance-pop and industrial music with hip-hop and R&B undertones influenced the development of the new jack swing genre by bridging the gap between the latter two styles. The accompanying music videos shot for the album's singles became popular on MTV, and obtained a then-unknown Paula Abdul a recording contract for her choreography work with Jackson. Billboard stated "[Jackson's] accessible sound and spectacularly choreographed videos were irresistible to MTV, and helped the channel evolve from rock programming to a broader, beat-driven musical mix."

In retrospect of her influence on the channel, Kyle Anderson of Entertainment Weekly commented: "The videos from Control were all over MTV, and Janet established herself as an instantly dominant pop figure talked about in the same sentences as Madonna and her older brother Michael." MTV's Meaghan Garvey asserted "it's hard to overstate the significance of Control, whether in terms of the pop landscape, the evolution of the music video as a vessel for promotion and expression, or Top 40 feminist anthems." She also argued "it's important to note that Control's self-actualization anthems were expressions of black female pride. Control spawned a whopping six videos—great ones, at that—which played an immeasurable role in the shift toward visible black pop."

=== 1989–1992: Janet Jackson's Rhythm Nation 1814 ===
Jackson released her fourth album, Rhythm Nation 1814, in September 1989. Although her record label desired a direct sequel to Control, Jackson chose to include a socially conscious theme among various musical styles. She stated, "I know an album or a song can't change the world. I just want my music and my dance to catch the audience's attention, and to hold it long enough for them to listen to the lyrics." The album's central theme of unity was developed in response to various crimes and tragedies reported in the media.

Peaking at number one on the Billboard 200, the album was certified sixfold Platinum by the RIAA and sold over 12 million copies worldwide. Rolling Stone observed Jackson's artistic growth shifted from "personal freedom to more universal concerns—injustice, illiteracy, crime, drugs—without missing a beat." The album was also considered "the exclamation point on her career", consisting of a "diverse collection of songs flowing with the natural talent Jackson possesses", which effectively "expanded Janet's range in every conceivable direction", being "more credibly feminine, more crucially masculine, more viably adult, more believably childlike." With singles "Miss You Much", "Rhythm Nation", "Escapade", "Alright", "Come Back to Me", "Black Cat" and "Love Will Never Do (Without You)", it became the only album to achieve seven top five singles on the Hot 100. Additionally, "Miss You Much", "Escapade", "Black Cat", and "Love Will Never Do (Without You)" made it the first album in history to produce number one hits in three separate calendar years.

Famous for its choreography and warehouse setting, the "Rhythm Nation" music video is considered one of the most iconic in history, with Jackson's military ensemble also making her a fashion icon. The video for "Love Will Never Do (Without You)" is notable for being the first instance of Jackson's transition into sexual imagery and midriff-baring style, becoming her trademark. Rhythm Nation 1814 became the highest selling album of 1990, winning a record fifteen Billboard Awards. The full Rhythm Nation 1814 short film won a Grammy Award.

Jackson's Rhythm Nation World Tour 1990 became the most successful debut tour in history and set a record for the fastest sell-out of Japan's Tokyo Dome. She established the "Rhythm Nation Scholarship", donating funds from the tour to various educational programs. As Jackson began her tour, she was acknowledged for the cultural impact of her music. Joel Selvin of the San Francisco Chronicle wrote "the 23-year-old has been making smash hit records for four years, becoming a fixture on MTV and a major role model to teenage girls across the country", and William Allen, then-executive vice president of the United Negro College Fund, told the Los Angeles Times, "Jackson is a role model for all young people to emulate and the message she has gotten to the young people of this country through the lyrics of 'Rhythm Nation 1814' is having positive effects."

She also received a star on the Hollywood Walk of Fame in recognition of her impact on the recording industry and philanthropic endeavors. The massive success experienced by Jackson placed her in league with her brother Michael, Madonna, and Tina Turner for her achievements and influence. Ebony magazine remarked: "No individual or group has impacted the world of entertainment as have Michael and Janet Jackson," arguing that despite many imitators, few could surpass Jackson's "stunning style and dexterity".

With her recording contract under A&M Records fulfilled in 1991, she signed a multimillion-dollar deal with Virgin Records—estimated between thirty-two to fifty million dollars—making her the highest paid recording artist at the time. The recording contract also established her reputation as the "Queen of Pop". In 1992, Jackson provided guest vocals on Luther Vandross's "The Best Things in Life Are Free", becoming a top ten Billboard hit and reaching the top ten internationally.

=== 1993–1996: Janet, Poetic Justice, and Design of a Decade ===
Jackson's fifth studio album, Janet, was released in May 1993. The record opened at number one on the Billboard 200, making Jackson the first female artist in the Nielsen SoundScan era to do so. Certified sixfold Platinum by the RIAA, it sold over 14 million copies worldwide.

Janet spawned five singles and four promotional singles, receiving various certifications worldwide. The lead single "That's the Way Love Goes" won the Grammy Award for Best R&B Song and topped the Billboard Hot 100 for eight consecutive weeks. "Again" reached number one for two weeks, while "If" and "Any Time, Any Place" peaked in the top four. "Because of Love" and "You Want This" charted within the top ten.

The album experimented with a diverse number of genres, including contemporary R&B, deep house, swing jazz, hip-hop, rock, and pop, with Billboard describing each as being "delivered with consummate skill and passion". Jackson took a larger role in songwriting and production than she did on her previous albums, explaining she found it necessary "to write all the lyrics and half of the melodies" while also speaking candidly about incorporating her sexuality into the album's content. Rolling Stone wrote "[a]s princess of America's black royal family, everything Janet Jackson does is important. Whether proclaiming herself in charge of her life, as she did on Control (1986), or commander in chief of a rhythm army dancing to fight society's problems (Rhythm Nation 1814, from 1989), she's influential. And when she announces her sexual maturity, as she does on her new album, Janet., it's a cultural moment."

In July 1993, Jackson made her film debut in Poetic Justice. While the film received mixed reviews, her performance was described as "beguiling" and "believably eccentric". Jackson's ballad "Again", which was written for the film, received Golden Globe and Academy Award nominations for "Best Original Song".

In September 1993, Jackson appeared topless on the cover of Rolling Stone, with her breasts covered anonymously by her then-husband, René Elizondo Jr. The photograph is the original version of the cropped image used on the Janet album cover, shot by Patrick Demarchelier. The Vancouver Sun reported, "Jackson, 27, remains clearly established as both role model and sex symbol; the Rolling Stone photo of Jackson ... became one of the most recognizable, and most lampooned, magazine covers."

The Janet World Tour launched in support of the studio album garnered criticism for Jackson's lack of vocal proficiency and spontaneity, but earned critical acclaim for her showmanship. It was described as erasing the line between "stadium-size pop music concerts and full-scale theatrical extravaganzas".

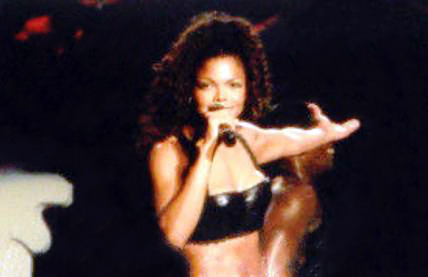
Jackson performing on one of the dates of her 1993–95 Janet World Tour

During this time, Janet was set to sign a multimillion-dollar deal with Coca-Cola when her brother Michael was immersed in a child sex abuse scandal, of which he denied any wrongdoing. She provided moral support, defending her brother, and denied abuse allegations regarding her parents made by her sister La Toya.

She collaborated with Michael on "Scream", the lead single from his album HIStory, released in 1995. The song was written by both siblings as a response to media scrutiny. It debuted at number five on the Hot 100 singles chart, becoming the first song ever to debut within the top five. Its music video, directed by Mark Romanek, was listed in Guinness World Records as the "Most Expensive Music Video Ever Made", costing $7 million. The clip won the 1996 Grammy Award for Best Short Form Music Video.

Jackson's first compilation album, Design of a Decade: 1986–1996, was released in 1995. It peaked at number three on the Billboard 200. The lead single, "Runaway", became the first song by a female artist to debut within the top ten of the Hot 100, reaching number three. Design of a Decade 1986–1996 was certified double Platinum by the RIAA.

Jackson's influence in pop music continued to garner acclaim, as The Boston Globe remarked "If you're talking about the female power elite in pop, you can't get much higher than Janet Jackson, Bonnie Raitt, Madonna and Yoko Ono. Their collective influence ... is beyond measure. And who could dispute that Janet Jackson now has more credibility than brother Michael?"

Jackson renewed her contract with Virgin Records for a reported $80 million the following year. The contract established her as the then highest-paid recording artist in history, surpassing the recording industry's then-unparalleled $60 million contracts earned by Michael Jackson and Madonna.

=== 1997–1999: The Velvet Rope ===
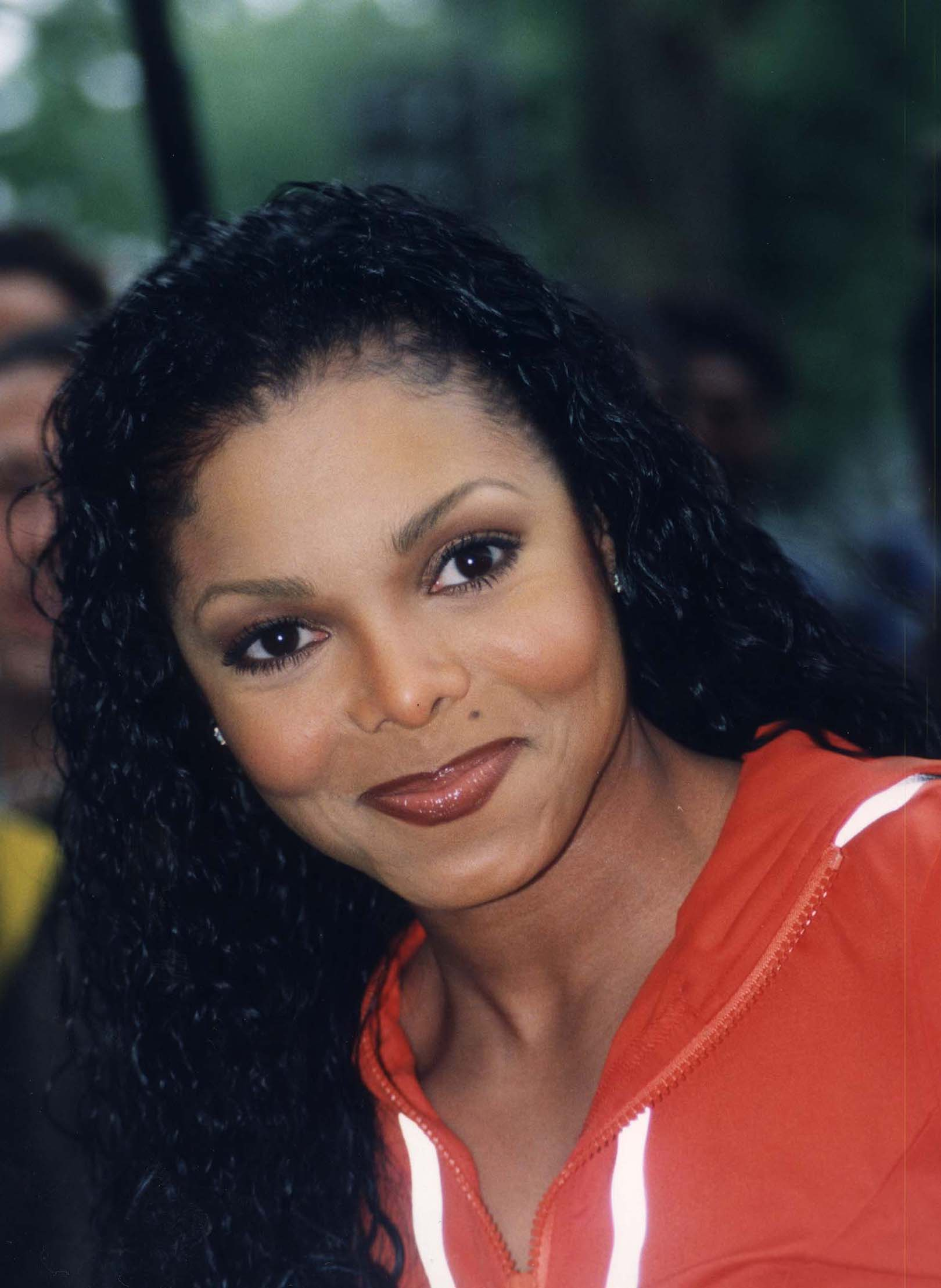
Jackson in 1998

Jackson began suffering from severe depression and anxiety, leading her to chronicle the experience in her sixth album, The Velvet Rope, released in October 1997. Jackson returned with a dramatic change in image, boasting vibrant red hair, nasal piercings, and tattoos. The album is primarily centered on the idea that everyone has an intrinsic need to belong. Aside from encompassing lyrics relating to social issues such as same-sex relationships, homophobia and domestic violence, it also contains themes of sadomasochism and is considered far more sexually explicit in nature than her previous release, Janet.

The record was hailed as "her most daring, elaborate and accomplished album" by The New York Times, while Billboard called it "the best American album of the year and the most empowering of her last five." The album debuted at number one on the Billboard 200 and was certified triple Platinum by the RIAA. It has sold over eight million copies worldwide.

The lead single "Got 'til It's Gone" was released in September 1997, featuring guest vocals from folk singer Joni Mitchell and rapper Q-Tip. The song's music video, depicting a pre-Apartheid celebration, won the Grammy Award for Best Short Form Music Video. "Together Again" became Jackson's eighth number-one hit on the Billboard Hot 100, placing her on par with Elton John, Diana Ross, and the Rolling Stones. It spent a record forty-six weeks on the Hot 100 and nineteen weeks on the United Kingdom's singles chart. It sold six million copies worldwide, becoming one of the best-selling singles of all time. "I Get Lonely" peaked at number three on the Hot 100, and received a Grammy nomination for Best Female R&B Vocal Performance. It was Jackson's eighteenth consecutive top ten hit, making her the only female artist to garner that achievement; and surpassed only by Elvis Presley and the Beatles.

Several other singles were released, including "Go Deep" and the ballad "Every Time", which was controversial for the nudity displayed in its music video. The album fully established Jackson as a gay icon for its themes regarding homosexuality and protesting homophobia. "Together Again", a "post-Aids pop song", and "Free Xone", considered "a paean to homosexuality" and an "anti-homophobia track", were praised for their lyrical context, in addition to Jackson's lesbian reinterpretation of Rod Stewart's "Tonight's the Night".

The Velvet Rope received an award for "Outstanding Music Album" at the 9th Annual GLAAD Media Awards and was honored by the National Black Lesbian and Gay Leadership Forum. A portion of the proceeds from "Together Again" were donated to the American Foundation for AIDS Research.

Jackson embarked on The Velvet Rope Tour, traveling to Europe, North America, Asia, Africa, New Zealand, and Australia. The tour received praise for its theatrics, choreography, and Jackson's vocal performance. It was likened to "the ambition and glamour of a Broadway musical", and exclaimed as "only fitting that the concert program credits her as the show's 'creator and director'".

The tour's HBO special, The Velvet Rope: Live in Madison Square Garden, garnered more than fifteen million viewers. It surpassed the ratings of all four major networks among viewers subscribed to the channel. The concert won an Emmy Award from four nominations. Jackson donated a portion of the tour's sales to America's Promise, an organization founded by Colin Powell to assist disenfranchised youth.

As the tour concluded, Jackson lent guest vocals to several collaborations, including Shaggy's "Luv Me, Luv Me", used for the film How Stella Got Her Groove Back, as well as "Girlfriend/Boyfriend" with Teddy Riley's group Blackstreet, and "What's It Gonna Be?!" with Busta Rhymes. The latter two music videos are both among the most expensive music videos ever produced, with "What's It Gonna Be?!" becoming a number-one hit on the Billboard Hip-Hop Singles and Hot Rap Tracks charts, reaching the top three of the Hot 100.

Jackson also contributed the ballad "God's Stepchild" to the Down in the Delta soundtrack. Jackson recorded a duet with Elton John titled "I Know the Truth", included on the soundtrack to Elton John and Tim Rice's Aida. At the 1999 World Music Awards, Jackson received the Legend Award for "outstanding contribution to the pop industry". Billboard ranked Jackson as the second most successful artist of the decade, behind Mariah Carey.

=== 2000–2003: Nutty Professor II: The Klumps and All for You ===
In July 2000, Jackson appeared in her second film, Nutty Professor II: The Klumps, in the role of Professor Denise Gaines, opposite Eddie Murphy. Director Peter Segal stated "Janet Jackson was a natural fit, and an obvious choice." The film became her second to open at number one, grossing an estimated $170 million worldwide. Jackson's single "Doesn't Really Matter", used for the film's soundtrack, became her ninth number-one single on the Hot 100.

Preceding the release of her seventh album, MTV honored Jackson with the network's inaugural "MTV Icon" ceremony, honoring her "significant contributions to music, music video and pop culture while tremendously impacting the MTV Generation." The event paid tribute to Jackson's career and influence, including commentary from Britney Spears, Jennifer Lopez, Aaliyah, and Jessica Simpson, and performances by 'N Sync, Pink, Destiny's Child, Usher, Buckcherry, Mýa, Macy Gray, and Outkast. The American Music Awards also honored Jackson with the Award of Merit for "her finely crafted, critically acclaimed and socially conscious, multi-platinum albums".

Jackson's seventh album, All for You, was released in April 2001. It opened at number one on the Billboard 200 with 605,000 copies sold, the highest first-week sales of her career, and among the highest first-week sales by a female artist in history. The album was a return to an upbeat dance style, receiving generally positive reception. Jackson received praise for indulging in "textures as dizzying as a new infatuation", in contrast to other artists attempting to "match the angularity of hip-hop" and following trends. All for You was certified double Platinum by the RIAA.

The album's lead single, "All for You", debuted on the Hot 100 at number fourteen, setting a record for the highest debut by a single that was not commercially available. Jackson was titled "Queen of Radio" by MTV as the single made airplay history, being "added to every pop, rhythmic and urban radio station" within its first week. The song broke the overall airplay debut record with a first week audience of seventy million, debuting at number nine on the Radio Songs chart. It topped the Hot 100 for seven weeks, also reaching the top ten in eleven countries. The song received a Grammy Award for Best Dance Recording. "Someone to Call My Lover" peaked at number three on the Hot 100.

In July 2001, Jackson embarked on the All for You Tour, which was also broadcast on a concert special for HBO watched by twelve million viewers. The tour traveled throughout the United States and Japan, although European and Asian dates were required to be canceled following the September 11 terrorist attacks. The Los Angeles Times complimented Jackson's showmanship. Richard Harrington of The Washington Post said Jackson's performance surpassed her contemporaries, but Bob Massy of Spin thought her dancers "threw crisper moves" and her supporting singers were mixed nearly as high, though declared "Janet cast herself as the real entertainment." Jackson donated a portion of the tour's proceeds to the Boys & Girls Clubs of America.

The following year, Jackson began receiving media attention for her rumored relationships with Justin Timberlake, actor Matthew McConaughey, and record producer Jermaine Dupri.

=== 2004–2005: Super Bowl XXXVIII controversy and Damita Jo ===
Jackson was chosen by the National Football League and MTV to perform at the Super Bowl XXXVIII halftime show in February 2004. She performed a medley of "All for You", "Rhythm Nation", and an excerpt of "The Knowledge" before performing "Rock Your Body" alongside surprise guest Justin Timberlake. As Timberlake sang the lyric "I'm gonna have you naked by the end of this song", he tore open her costume, exposing her right breast to 140 million viewers. The incident was referred to as "nipple gate" by the media.

Jackson issued an apology after the performance, saying that the incident was accidental and unintended, explaining that Timberlake was only meant to pull away a bustier and leave the red-lace bra intact. She commented, "I am really sorry if I offended anyone. That was truly not my intention ... MTV, CBS, the NFL had no knowledge of this whatsoever, and unfortunately, the whole thing went wrong in the end." Timberlake also issued an apology, calling the accident a "wardrobe malfunction". CBS, the NFL, and MTV denied any knowledge of the incident and all responsibility for it. The Federal Communications Commission heavily fined all companies involved and continued an investigation for eight years, ultimately losing its appeal for a $550,000 fine against CBS.

Following the incident, CBS permitted Timberlake to appear at the 46th Grammy Awards ceremony but did not allow Jackson to attend, forcing her to withdraw after being scheduled as a presenter. The controversy halted plans for Jackson to star in the biographical film of singer and activist Lena Horne, which was to be produced by ABC. Horne was reportedly displeased by the incident, but Jackson's representatives stated that she withdrew from the project willingly. A Mickey Mouse statue wearing Jackson's iconic "Rhythm Nation" outfit was mantled at Walt Disney World theme park the previous year to honor her legacy, but it was removed following her controversial performance.

Jackson's eighth studio album Damita Jo was released in March 2004, titled after her middle name. It debuted at number two on the Billboard 200. The album received mixed to positive reviews, praising the sonic innovation of selected songs and Jackson's vocal harmonies, while others criticized its frequent themes of carnality. However, several critics' reviews focused on the Super Bowl incident, rather than critiquing the album itself. It was certified Platinum by the RIAA within a month, and sold over three million copies worldwide.

The album's performance was affected by blacklisting from radio and music channels, in part at the behest of CBS CEO Les Moonves. Conglomerates involved in the boycott included Viacom and CBS, subsidiaries MTV, Clear Channel Communications, and Infinity Broadcasting, the latter two among the largest radio broadcasters. The blacklist was placed into effect preceding the release of Damita Jo and continued throughout the course of Jackson's following two albums. Entertainment conglomerate Viacom owns MTV, VH1, and many radio formats, and a senior executive commented that they were "absolutely bailing on the record. The pressure is so great, they can't align with anything related to Janet. The high-ups are still pissed at her, and this is a punitive measure."

Prior to the incident, Damita Jo was expected to outsell prior release All for You. Its three singles received positive reviews but failed to achieve high chart positions, although each was predicted to perform extremely well under different circumstances. Billboard reported that Damita Jo "was largely overshadowed by the Super Bowl fiasco.... The three singles it spawned were blacklisted by pop radio—they were also the album's biggest highlights".

For the album's promotion, Jackson appeared as a host on Saturday Night Live performing two songs, and she was also a guest star on the sitcom Will & Grace portraying herself. Jackson received several career accolades upon the album's release, including the "Legend Award" at the Radio Music Awards, "Inspiration Award" from the Japan Video Music Awards, "Lifetime Achievement Award" at the Soul Train Music Awards, and a Teen Choice Awards nomination for "Favorite Female".

In November 2004, she was honored as a role model by 100 Black Men of America, Inc. and presented with the organization's Artistic Achievement Award saluting "a career that has gone from success to greater success". The organization responded to criticism for honoring Jackson in light of the Super Bowl incident by saying that "an individual's worth can't be judged by a single moment in that person's life." In June 2005, she was honored with a Humanitarian Award by the Human Rights Campaign and AIDS Project Los Angeles as recognition for her involvement in raising money for AIDS charities.

==== Impact on the Internet ====
The Super Bowl XXXVIII halftime show is considered to be one of the most controversial televised events in history, and Jackson was later listed in Guinness World Records as the "Most Searched in Internet History" and the "Most Searched for News Item". The incident became the most recorded and replayed moment in TiVo history, enticing an estimated 35,000 new subscribers. Jawed Karim has stated that the incident inspired the creation of YouTube, as he noted that it was difficult for him to find videos of the incident online.

=== 2006–2007: 20 Y.O. and Why Did I Get Married? ===
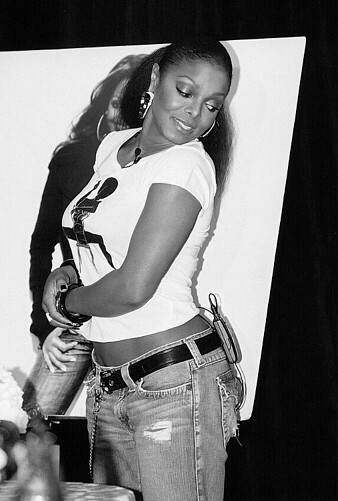
Jackson promoting her 2006 studio album, 20 Y.O.

Jackson began recording her ninth studio album, 20 Y.O., in 2005. She recorded with producers Dupri, Jam and Lewis for several months during the following year. The album's title was a reference to the two decades since the release of her breakthrough album Control, representing the album's "celebration of the joyful liberation and history-making musical style".

To promote the album, Jackson appeared in various magazines, and performed on the Today Show and at the Billboard Awards. Jackson's Us Weekly cover, revealing her slim figure after heavy media focus was placed on her fluctuations in weight, became the magazine's best-selling issue in history. 20 Y.O. was released in September 2006 and debuted at number two on the Billboard 200. The album received mixed reviews, with multiple critics chastising the production and involvement of Jermaine Dupri. Rolling Stone disagreed with the album's reference to Control, saying "If we were her, we wouldn't make the comparison."

Jackson's airplay and music channel blacklist remained persistent, massively affecting her chart performance and exposure. However, lead single "Call on Me", which featured rapper Nelly, peaked at number 25 on the Hot 100, number one on the Hot R&B/Hip-Hop Songs chart, and number six in the United Kingdom. The video for the album's second single, "So Excited", was directed by Joseph Kahn and portrayed Jackson's clothes disappearing through a complex dance routine.

20 Y.O. was certified Platinum by the RIAA and sold 1.5 million copies worldwide, also receiving a Grammy nomination for Best Contemporary R&B Album. After the album's release, Dupri was condemned for his production and misguidance of the album, and subsequently was removed from his position at Virgin Records. Slant Magazine stated, "After promising a return to Janet's dance-pop origins, [Dupri] opted to aim for urban audiences, a colossal mistake that cost Dupri his job and, probably, Janet her deal with Virgin."

Jackson was ranked the seventh richest woman in the entertainment industry by Forbes, having amassed a fortune of over $150 million. In 2007, she starred opposite Tyler Perry as a psychotherapist in the film Why Did I Get Married?. It became her third consecutive film to open at number one at the box office, grossing $60 million. Jackson's performance was praised for its "soft authority", though also described as "charming, yet bland".

=== 2008–2009: Discipline and Number Ones ===
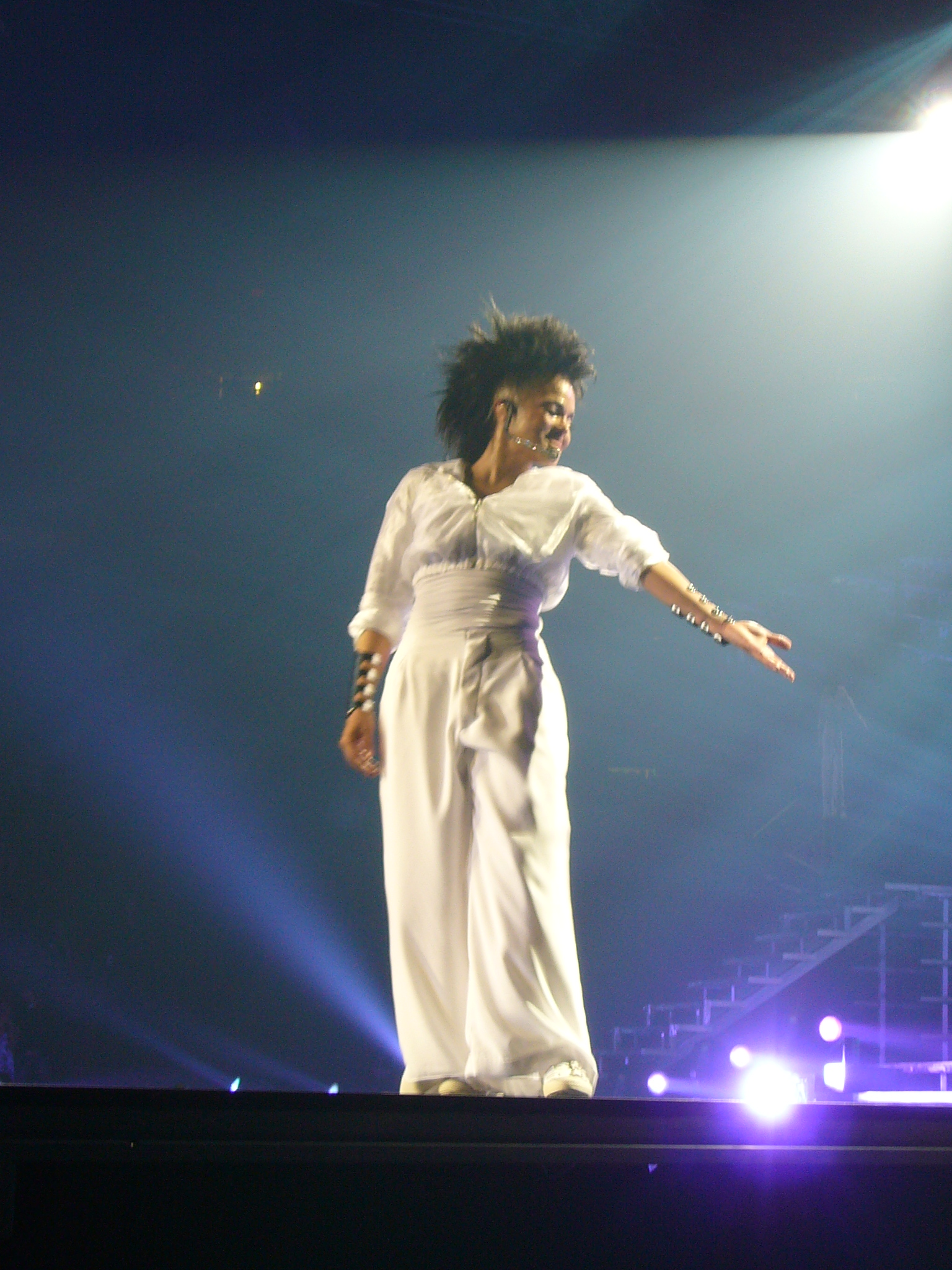
Jackson performing during the 2008 Rock Witchu Tour

Jackson signed with Island Records after her contract with Virgin was fulfilled. She interrupted plans for touring and began recording with various producers, including Rodney "Darkchild" Jerkins, Tricky Stewart, and Stargate. Her tenth studio album, Discipline, was released in February 2008, opening at number one. Despite radio blacklisting, the album's first single "Feedback" peaked at number 19 on the Hot 100 and nine on Pop Songs, her highest-charting single since "Someone to Call My Lover".

Also in February 2008, Jackson won an Image Award for "Outstanding Supporting Actress in a Motion Picture" for the role. Jackson was also approached to record the lead single for the film Rush Hour 3. Jackson was awarded the Vanguard Award at the 19th annual GLAAD Media Awards, honoring her contributions in promoting equal rights among the gay community. The organization's president commented, "Ms. Jackson has a tremendous following inside the LGBT community and out, and having her stand with us against the defamation that LGBT people still face in our country is extremely significant."

Jackson's fifth concert tour, the Rock Witchu Tour, began in September 2008. Jackson parted with Island Records through mutual agreement. Billboard disclosed Jackson was dissatisfied with L.A. Reid's handling of the album and its promotion, saying "the label agreed to dissolve their relationship with the artist at her request." Producer Rodney Jerkins expressed "I felt like it wasn't pushed correctly.... She just didn't get her just due as an artist of that magnitude."

In June 2009, Jackson's brother Michael died at age fifty. She spoke publicly concerning his death at the 2009 BET Awards, stating "I'd just like to say, to you, Michael is an icon, to us, Michael is family. And he will forever live in all of our hearts. On behalf of my family and myself, thank you for all of your love, thank you for all of your support. We miss him so much." In an interview, she revealed she had first learned of his death while filming Why Did I Get Married Too?.

Amidst mourning with her family, she focused on work to deal with the grief, avoiding any news coverage of her sibling's death. She commented, "it's still important to face reality, and not that I'm running, but sometimes you just need to get away for a second." During this time, she ended her seven-year relationship with Jermaine Dupri.

Several months later, Jackson performed a tribute to Michael at the 2009 MTV Video Music Awards, performing their duet "Scream". MTV stated "there was no one better than Janet to anchor it and send a really powerful message." The performance was lauded by critics, with Entertainment Weekly affirming the rendition "as energetic as it was heartfelt".

Jackson's second hits compilation, Number Ones (retitled The Best for international releases), was released in November 2009. For promotion, she performed a medley of hits at the American Music Awards, Capital FM's Jingle Bell Ball at London's O2 arena, and The X-Factor. The album's promotional single "Make Me", produced with Rodney "Darkchild" Jerkins, debuted in September. It became Jackson's nineteenth number one on the Hot Dance Club Songs chart, making her the first artist to have number-one singles in four separate decades.

Later that month, Jackson chaired the inaugural benefit of amfAR, The Foundation for AIDS Research, held in Milan in conjunction with fashion week. The foundation's CEO stated: "We are profoundly grateful to Janet Jackson for joining amfAR as a chair of its first event in Milan... She brings incomparable grace and a history of dedication to the fight against AIDS." The event raised $1.1 million for the nonprofit organization.

=== 2010–2014: Film projects and True You ===
In April 2010, Jackson reprised her role in the sequel to Why Did I Get Married?, titled Why Did I Get Married Too?. The film opened at number two, grossing $60 million. Jackson's performance was hailed as "invigorating and oddly funny", and praised for her "willingness to be seen at her most disheveled". Her performance earned her an Image Award for "Outstanding Actress in a Motion Picture". Jackson recorded the film's theme, "Nothing", released as a promotional single. The song was performed on the ninth season finale of American Idol along with "Again" and "Nasty".

In July, Jackson modeled for the Blackglama clothing line featuring mink fur, then helped design a signature line of clothing and accessories for Blackglama, to be sold at Saks Fifth Avenue and Bloomingdales. Universal Music released Jackson's third hits compilation, Icon: Number Ones, as the debut of the Icon compilation series.

In November 2010, Jackson starred as Joanna in the drama For Colored Girls, the film adaptation of Ntozake Shange's 1975 play For Colored Girls Who Have Considered Suicide When the Rainbow Is Enuf. The Wall Street Journal stated Jackson "recites verses written by Ntozake Shange, the author of the play that inspired the film ... But instead of offering up a mannered coffeehouse reading of the lines, Jackson makes the words sound like ordinary—though very eloquent—speech." Jackson's portrayal in the film was likened to Meryl Streep as Miranda Priestly in The Devil Wears Prada. Her performance earned Black Reel Awards nominations in the categories of Outstanding Supporting Actress and Outstanding Ensemble.

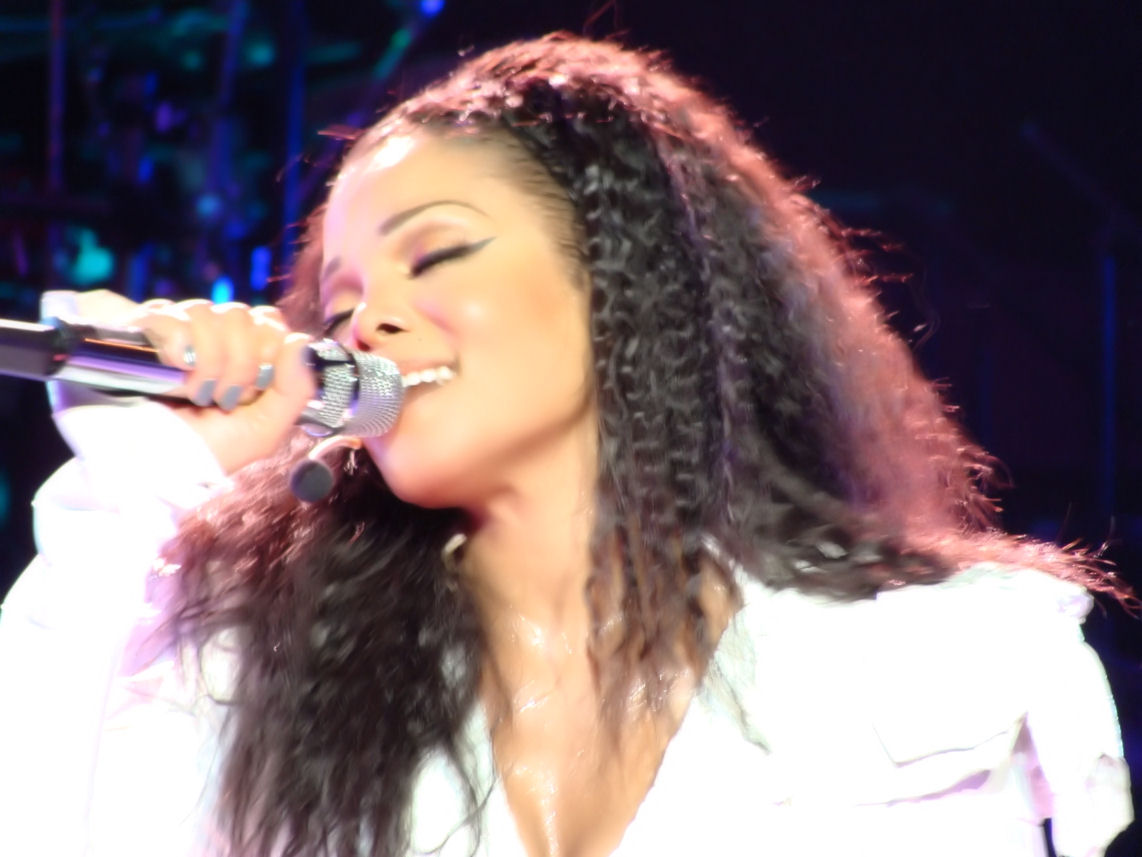
Jackson performing during the 2011 Number Ones, Up Close and Personal tour

In support of her second hits collection, Number Ones, Jackson embarked on her largest world tour, entitled Number Ones, Up Close and Personal; she held concerts in thirty-five global cities, selected by fans who submitted suggestions on her official website. During the tour, Jackson performed thirty-five number one hits and dedicated a song to each city. Mattel released a limited-edition Barbie of Jackson titled "Divinely Janet", auctioned for over $15,000, with proceeds donated to Project Angel Food.

Jackson released the self-help book True You: A Journey to Finding and Loving Yourself in February 2011, co-written with David Ritz. It chronicled her struggle with weight and confidence, also publishing letters from fans. It topped The New York Times' Best Seller list the following month. Additionally, she signed a film production contract with Lions Gate Entertainment to "select, develop and produce a feature film for the independent studio."

Jackson became the first female pop singer to perform at the I. M. Pei glass pyramid at the Louvre Museum, raising contributions for the restoration of iconic artwork. Jackson was selected to endorse fashion line Blackglama for a second year, being the first celebrity in the line's history chosen to do so. She partnered with the label to release a fifteen-piece collection of luxury products.

In 2012, Jackson endorsed Nutrisystem, sponsoring their weight-loss program after struggling with weight fluctuations in the past. With the program, she donated ten million dollars in meals to the hungry. She was honored by amfAR for her contributions to AIDS research when chairing the Cinema Against AIDS gala during the Cannes Film Festival. She also participated in a public service announcement for UNICEF to help starving children.

=== 2015–2019: Unbreakable, touring and Rock and Roll Hall of Fame ===
In the wake of releasing a new album, scheduled for the fall of 2015, Jackson founded her own record label, Rhythm Nation, distributed by BMG Rights Management. The launch of label established Jackson as one of the few African-American female musicians to own a record label. The label's first release was the lead single from the upcoming album, "No Sleeep", on June 22. Jackson's solo version of the single debuted on the Hot 100 at number 67, marking her 40th entry on the chart. The song went to number one on the Billboard + Twitter Trending 140 immediately following the release. The album version featuring J. Cole enabled it to re-enter the Hot 100 with a new peak position at number 63, while also topping the Adult R&B Songs chart.

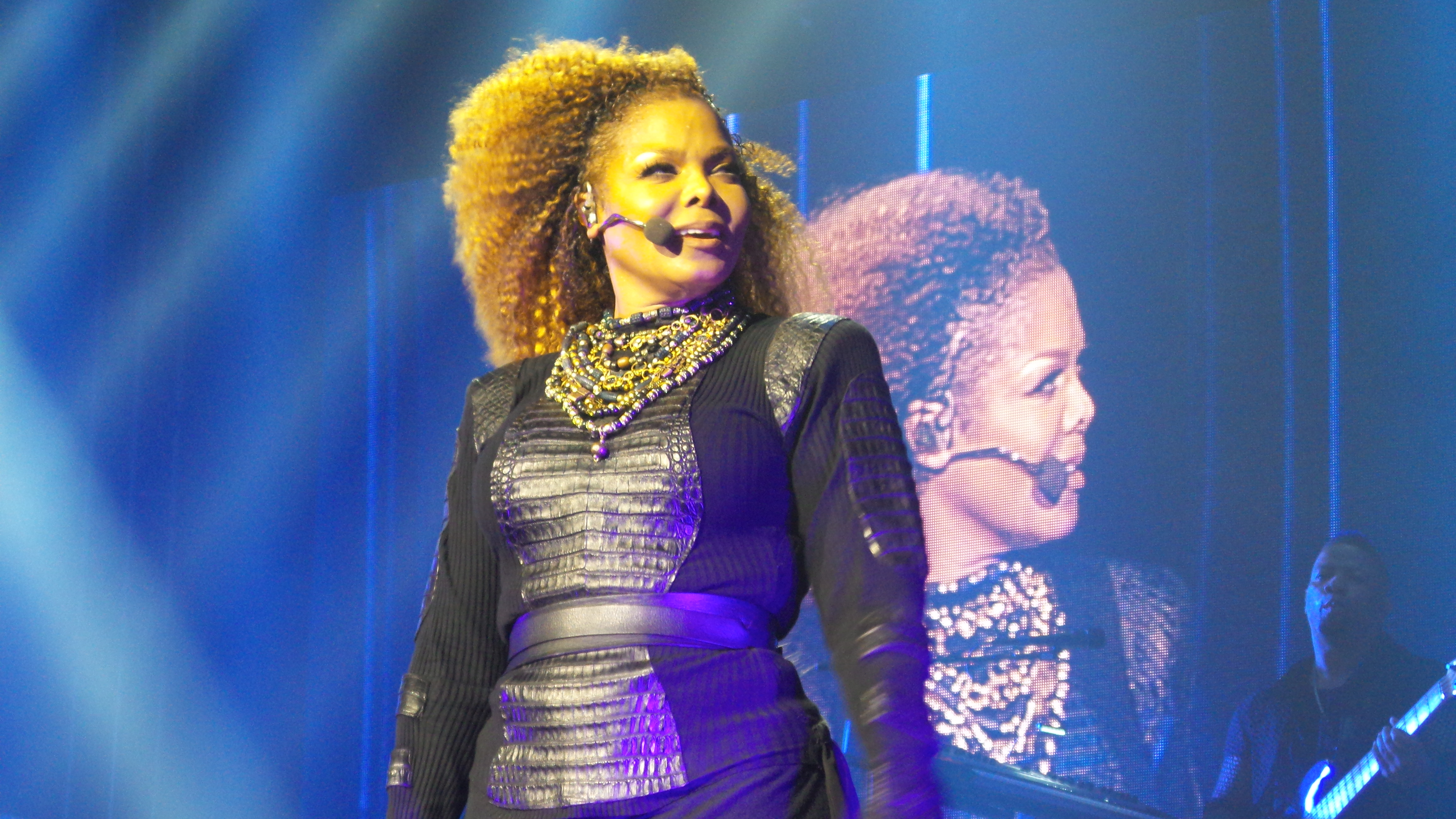
Jackson performing during the 2015–16 Unbreakable Tour

BET presented Jackson with their inaugural Ultimate Icon: Music Dance Visual award at the BET Awards 2015, which also featured a dance tribute to her performed by Ciara, Jason Derulo and Tinashe. She launched a luxury jewelry line called the "Janet Jackson Unbreakable Diamonds collection", a joint venture between herself and Paul Raps New York. On August 20, she released a preview of a new song "The Great Forever" followed by the launch of her Unbreakable World Tour on August 31.

The upcoming album's title track "Unbreakable" was released on September 11, 2015. "Burnitup!" featuring Missy Elliott debuted on BBC Radio 1 on September 24, 2015.

The Unbreakable album was released on October 2, 2015. It received largely positive reviews, including those by The Wall Street Journal, The New York Times, USA Today, Los Angeles Times, and The Guardian. The following week, Jackson received her first nomination to be inducted into the Rock and Roll Hall of Fame. Her album debuted at number one on the Billboard 200, becoming her seventh album to top the chart in the United States. Jimmy Jam and Terry Lewis stated that Jackson's concept for the album was developed simultaneously with the accompanying tour's production and that its composition differed from the majority of her catalog. They also stated that the album's theme reflects "being able to be vulnerable and to be able to withstand what comes to you," drawing on Jackson's experiences over the past several years.

On April 6, 2016, Jackson postponed her tour in favour of "planning her family" with husband Wissam Al Mana. On September 7, 2017, Jackson resumed her Unbreakable World Tour, now known as the State of the World Tour. Refocusing the tour's theme to reflect socially conscious messages from Jackson's entire music catalog, many songs selected for the concert set list along with corresponding imagery depicted on stage address racism, white supremacy, fascism, xenophobia and police brutality. The tour opened to positive critical reception, with several commentators praising Jackson's post-pregnancy physical fitness, showmanship and socially conscious messages.

Her emotional rendition of "What About", a song about domestic violence originally recorded for The Velvet Rope, drew media attention highlighting her recent separation from her husband; Jackson's brother Randy alleges she suffered verbal abuse by Al Mana which contributed to the breakdown of their marriage. Proceeds from the concert of September 9, 2017, at the Toyota Center in Houston, Texas were donated to relief efforts supporting evacuees of Hurricane Harvey. Jackson met with Houston mayor Sylvester Turner and evacuees at the George R. Brown Convention Center prior to the performance. Jackson received the Billboard Icon Award at the 2018 Billboard Music Awards. In an interview for Billboard magazine, Jackson revealed that she was then working on new music. On August 16, 2018, Jackson and Rhythm Nation entered into a partnership with Cinq Music Group. The next day, Jackson released the single "Made for Now", a collaboration with Daddy Yankee.

In October 2018, she received her third nomination for induction into the Rock and Roll Hall of Fame. In 2019, Jackson was inducted into the Rock and Roll Hall of Fame.

On May 17, 2019, Jackson launched a four-month Las Vegas residency entitled Metamorphosis. The initial schedule comprised fourteen shows at the Park Theater at Park MGM resort; three additional shows were added in May. In September and November 2019 Jackson performed a series of concerts in support of the 30th anniversary of the Rhythm Nation album in Welch Treasure Island Resort & Casino, San Francisco and Hawaii. In 2019, Jackson played a variety of festivals in the US and abroad, including The Glastonbury Festival.

=== 2020–present: Documentaries and continued touring ===
Jackson was set to embark on the Black Diamond World Tour in 2020 in support of her twelfth studio album Black Diamond, which was scheduled for a release that year. However, the tour was postponed indefinitely due to the COVID-19 pandemic.

A two-part documentary titled Janet Jackson for Lifetime and A&E premiered on January 28 and 29, 2022, respectively. Jackson previewed a clip of a new song, "Luv I Luv", during the end credits of the last episode of her documentary. Jackson was a headliner of the 2022 Essence Music Festival in New Orleans.

On April 14, 2023, Jackson launched her Together Again Tour, which later became the highest-grossing tour of her career. On March 8, 2023, Lifetime and A&E greenlit a follow-up documentary series, Janet Jackson: Family First. The series will follow Jackson as she prepares for her Together Again Tour as well as her and brother Randy's attempts to reunite the family band.

On December 30, 2024, Jackson began another Las Vegas concert residency, Janet Jackson: Las Vegas. On January 14, 2025, six shows were added for May of the same year. That September, she was featured on "Principal", a track from Cardi B's album Am I the Drama (2025), which samples Jackson's "The Pleasure Principle". The song debuted at number 92 on the Hot 100, making Jackson the first black female artist to chart new songs in five distinct decades.

In February 2026, a concert tour in Japan was announced to take place in June of the same year. One month later, it was revealed Jackson had signed a global publishing deal with Believe Music. On June 12, 2026, Jackson released a remix of "Doesn't Really Matter", in collaboration with Japanese boy band Be First; the single peaked at number 12 on the Billboard Japan Hot 100. Sixteen days later, she made an appearance at BET Awards 2026, where she presented Teyana Taylor with the Icon of the Year Award. On July 6, 2026, Jackson appeared in an Aaliyah tribute, via a video montage, for the finale at that year's Essence Festival of Culture.

==== Upcoming projects ====
In July 2026, it was announced Wowow would broadcast and stream a recording of the tour.A special, Janet Jackson Japan Tour 2026, filmed during Jackson's concerts in Japan, is scheduled to air on September 26, 2026, via Wowow. She will celebrate the 40th anniversary of the release of Control with a concert at Amerant Bank Arena in Sunrise, Florida, on December 12, 2026. Produced by Airtab Music and announced on August 12 of the same year, the concert will be filmed by filmmaker Leslie Small.

== Artistry ==
=== Influences ===
Jackson has described Lena Horne as one of her primary inspirations. Upon Horne's death, she stated "[Horne] brought much joy into everyone's lives—even the younger generations, younger than myself. She was such a great talent. She opened up such doors for artists like myself." Similarly, she considers Dorothy Dandridge to be one of her idols.

Jackson has declared herself "a very big Joni Mitchell fan", explaining: "As a kid I was drawn to Joni Mitchell records [...] Joni's songs spoke to me in an intimate, personal way." She holds reverence for Tina Turner, stating "Tina has become a heroic figure for many people, especially women, because of her tremendous strength. Personally, Tina doesn't seem to have a beginning or an end in my life. I felt her music was always there, and I feel like it always will be." She has also named other socially conscious acts, such as Tracy Chapman, Sly and the Family Stone, U2, and Bob Dylan, as sources of inspiration.

In her early career, Jackson also credited her brothers Michael and Jermaine Jackson as musical influences.

=== Music and voice ===
Jackson possesses a mezzo-soprano vocal range. Over the course of her career, she has received frequent criticism for the limitations of her vocal capabilities, especially in comparison to contemporary artists such as Whitney Houston and Mariah Carey. In comparing her vocal technique to Houston and Aretha Franklin, vocal coach Roger Love states that "[w]hen Janet sings, she allows a tremendous amount of air to come through. She's obviously aiming for a sexy, sultry effect, and on one level that works nicely. But actually, it's fairly limited." He adds that while her voice is suitable for studio recording, it doesn't translate well to the stage because despite having "great songs, incredible dancing, and her star-like presence, the live show is still magnificent. But the voice is not the star."

Biographer David Ritz commented, "on Janet's albums—and in her videos and live performances, which revealed a crisp, athletic dance technique [...] singing wasn't the point," saying emphasis was placed on "her slamming beats, infectious hooks, and impeccable production values." Eric Henderson of Slant magazine claimed critics opposing her small voice "somehow missed the explosive 'gimme a beat' vocal pyrotechnics she unleashes all over 'Nasty' ... Or that they completely dismissed how perfect her tremulous hesitance fits into the abstinence anthem 'Let's Wait Awhile'." Classical composer Louis Andriessen has praised Jackson for her "rubato, sense of rhythm, sensitivity, and the childlike quality of her strangely erotic voice."

Several critics also consider her voice to often be enveloped within her music's production. Wendy Robinson of PopMatters said "the power of Janet Jackson's voice does not lie in her pipes. She doesn't blow, she whispers ... Jackson's confectionary vocals are masterfully complemented by gentle harmonies and balanced out by pulsing rhythms, so she's never unpleasant to listen to." In a retrospective review of her 2004 album Damita Jo, Rich Juzwiak of Pitchfork wrote that "[whilst] Jackson doesn't have a technically great voice, she is an excellent singer...she performs with gusto and conviction, has a nimble sense of rhythm that makes [her] vocal pitter-patter around her beats. She doesn't have pipes that will blow the ceiling off a church, but she's a deft performer, and she, Jam, and Lewis know exactly what to do to enhance her limitations. Nothing about her voice aesthetically suggests power, but what is it if not almighty power to be able to transcend notions of traditional proficiency?"

Matthew Perpetua of Fluxblog suggested Jackson's vocal techniques as a study for indie rock music, considering it to possess "a somewhat subliminal effect on the listener, guiding and emphasizing dynamic shifts without distracting attention from its primal hooks." Perpetua added: "Her voice effortlessly transitions from a rhythmic toughness to soulful emoting to a flirty softness without overselling any aspect of her performance ... a continuum of emotions and attitudes that add up to the impression that we're listening to the expression of a fully-formed human being with contradictions and complexities."

Jackson's music encompasses a broad range of genres, including R&B, pop, dance, and new jack swing, Her records from the 1980s have been described as being influenced by Prince, as her producers are ex-members of the Time. Sal Cinquemani wrote that in addition to defining Top 40 radio, she "gave Prince's Minneapolis sound a distinctly feminine—and, with songs like 'What Have You Done for Me Lately?,' 'Nasty,' 'Control,' and 'Let's Wait Awhile,' a distinctly feminist—spin."

On Control, Richard J. Ripani documented that she, Jam, and Lewis had "crafted a new sound that fuses the rhythmic elements of funk and disco, along with heavy doses of synthesizers, percussion, sound effects, and a rap music sensibility." Author Rickey Vincent stated that she has often been credited for redefining the standard of popular music with the industrial music beats of the album. She is considered a trendsetter in pop balladry, with Richard Rischar stating "the black pop ballad of the mid-1980s had been dominated by the vocal and production style that was smooth and polished, led by singers Whitney Houston, Janet Jackson, and James Ingram."

Jackson continued her musical development by blending pop and urban music with elements of hip-hop in the nineties. This included a softer representation, articulated by lush, soulful ballads and up-tempo dance beats. She is described by music critic Greg Kot as "an artist who has reshaped the sound and image of rhythm and blues" within the first decade of her career. Critic Karla Peterson remarked that "she is a sharp dancer, an appealing performer, and as 'That's the Way Love Goes' proves—an ace pop-song writer." Selected material from the following decade has been viewed less favorably, as Sal Cinquemani comments "except for maybe R.E.M., no other former superstar act has been as prolific with such diminishing commercial and creative returns."

Jackson has changed her lyrical focus over the years, becoming the subject of analysis in musicology, African American studies, and gender studies. David Ritz compared Jackson's musical style to Marvin Gaye's, stating, "like Marvin, autobiography seemed the sole source of her music. Her art, also like Marvin's, floated over a reservoir of secret pain." Much of her success has been attributed to "a series of powerful, metallic grooves; her chirpy, multi-tracked vocals; and a lyrical philosophy built on pride and self-knowledge." Ritz also stated, "The mystery is the low flame that burns around the perimeters of Janet Jackson's soul. The flame feeds off the most highly combustible elements: survival and ambition, caution and creativity, supreme confidence and dark fear."

During the 1980s, her lyrics embodied self-actualization, feminist principles, and politically driven ideology. Gillian G. Gaar described Control as "an autobiographical tale about her life with her parents, her first marriage, and breaking free." Jessie Carney Smith wrote "with that album, she asserted her independence, individuality, and personal power. She challenged audiences to see her as a transformed person, from an ingénue to a grow-up, multi-talented celebrity." Referring to Rhythm Nation 1814 as an embodiment of hope, Timothy E. Scheurer wrote "It may remind some of Sly Stone prior to There's a Riot Going On and other African-American artists of the 1970s in its tacit assumption that the world imagined by Dr. King is still possible, that the American Dream is a dream for all people."

On Janet, Jackson began focusing on sexual themes. Shayne Lee wrote that her music over the following decade "brand[ed] her as one of the most sexually stimulating vocalists of the 1990s." Lilly J. Goren observed, "Jackson's evolution from politically aware musician to sexy diva marked the direction that society and the music industry were encouraging the dance-rock divas to pursue." The Washington Post declared Jackson's public image over the course of her career had shifted "from innocence to experience, inspiring such carnal albums as 1993's 'Janet' and 1997's 'The Velvet Rope', the latter of which explored the bonds—figuratively and literally—of love and lust."

The song "Free Xone" from The Velvet Rope, which portrays same-sex relationships in a positive light, is described by sociologist Shayne Lee as "a rare incident in which a popular black vocalist explores romantic or sensual energy outside the contours of heteronormativity, making it a significant song in black sexual politics." During the promotion for Janet, she stated "I love feeling deeply sexual—and don't mind letting the world know. For me, sex has become a celebration, a joyful part of the creative process."

Upon the release of Damita Jo, Jackson stated "Beginning with the earlier albums, exploring—and liberating—my sexuality has been an ongoing discovery and theme," adding "As an artist, that's not only my passion, it's my obligation." Stephen Thomas Erlewine has found Jackson's consistent inclusion of sex in her music lacking ingenuity, especially in comparisons to other artists such as Prince, stating "while sex indisputably fuels much great pop music, it isn't an inherently fascinating topic for pop music—as with anything, it all depends on the artist."

=== Videos and stage ===
Jackson drew inspiration for her music videos and performances from musicals she watched in her youth, and was heavily influenced by the choreography of Fred Astaire and Michael Kidd, among others. Throughout her career, she has worked with and brought numerous professional choreographers to prominence, such as Tina Landon, Paula Abdul, and Michael Kidd. Veronica Chambers declared, "Her impact on pop music is undeniable and far-reaching," adding, "A quick glance at the Billboard chart reveals any number of artists cast in the Janet Jackson mold." Chambers observed numerous videos which "features not only Ms. Jackson's dancers, but choreography and sets remarkably like those she has used."

Janine Coveney of Billboard observed that "Jackson's musical declaration of independence [Control] launched a string of hits, an indelible production sound, and an enduring image cemented by groundbreaking video choreography and imagery that pop vocalists still emulate." Ben Hogwood of MusicOMH applauded the "huge influence she has become on younger pretenders to her throne," most notably Britney Spears, Jennifer Lopez and Christina Aguilera. Qadree EI-Amin remarked that many pop artists "pattern their performances after Janet's proven dance-diva persona." Beretta E. Smith-Shomade wrote that "Jackson's impact on the music video sphere came largely through music sales successes, which afforded her more visual liberties and control. This assuming of control directly impacted the look and content of her music videos, giving Jackson an agency not assumed by many other artists—male or female, Black or White."

Parallel Lines: Media Representations of Dance (1993) documents that her videos have often been reminiscent of live concerts or elaborate musical theater. However, in her 30-minute Rhythm Nation 1814 film, Jackson utilizes street dancing techniques in contrast to traditional choreography. The group dynamic visually embodies gender-neutral equality, with Jackson "performing asexually and anonymously in front of, but as one of the members of the group." Her music videos have also contributed to a higher degree of sexual freedom among young women, with Jackson "heavily implying male-on-female oral sex in music videos by pushing down on a man's head until he's in exactly the right position." However, accusations of cosmetic surgery, skin lightening, and increasingly hypersexual imagery have led to her being viewed as conforming to a white, male-dominated view of sexuality, rather than liberating herself or others.

Jackson received the MTV Video Vanguard Award for her contributions to the art form, and she became the first recipient of the MTV Icon tribute, celebrating her impact on the music industry as a whole. In 2003, Slant Magazine named "Rhythm Nation" and "Got 'til It's Gone" among the 100 Greatest Music Videos of all time, ranked at number 87 and number 10, respectively. In 2011, "Rhythm Nation" was voted the tenth best music video of the 1980s by Billboard.

Independent Journalist Nicholas Barber stated "Janet's concerts are the pop equivalent of a summer blockbuster movie, with all the explosions, special effects, ersatz sentimentality, gratuitous cleavage, and emphasis on spectacle over coherence that the term implies." Jet magazine reported "Janet's innovative stage performances during her world tours have won her a reputation as a world-class performer." Chris Willman of the Los Angeles Times stated the "enthralling" choreography of Jackson's Rhythm Nation 1814 Tour "represents the pinnacle of what can be done in the popping 'n' locking style—a rapid-fire mixture of rigidly jerky and gracefully fluid movements." When Jackson was asked "do you understand it when people talk about [The Velvet Rope Tour] in terms of Broadway?", she responded, "I'm crazy about Broadway ... That's what I grew up on."

Her "Number Ones: Up Close and Personal" tour deviated from the full-scale theatrics found in her previous concert arena settings in favor of smaller venues. Critics noted being scaled down did not affect the impact of her showmanship, and in some cases, enhanced it. Greg Kot of the Chicago Tribune wrote, "In past tours, Jackson's thin voice was often swallowed up by the sheer size of her production ... In the more scaled-down setting, Jackson brought a warmth and a passion that wasn't always evident in stadiums ... the best Janet Jackson performance I've covered in 20-plus years."

Thor Christensen of The Dallas Morning News reported Jackson often lip syncs in concert; he wrote: "Janet Jackson—one of pop's most notorious onstage lip-syncers—conceded ... she uses 'some' taped vocals to augment her live vocals. But she refused to say what percentage of her concert 'voice' is taped and how much is live." Michael MacCambridge of the Austin American-Statesman, who reviewed Jackson's Rhythm Nation World Tour, described lip-syncing as a "moot point", stating "Jackson was frequently singing along with her own pre-recorded vocals, to achieve a sound closer to radio versions of singles." MacCambridge also observed "it seemed unlikely that anyone—even a prized member of the First Family of Soul Music—could dance like she did for 90 minutes and still provide the sort of powerful vocals that the '90s super concerts are expected to achieve."

Similarly, Chris Willman commented, "even a classically trained vocalist would be hard-pressed to maintain any sort of level of volume—or, more appropriately, 'Control'—while bounding up and down stairs and whipping limbs in unnatural directions at impeccable, breakneck speed." Critics observed that in the smaller scale of her "Number Ones: Up Close and Personal" tour, she forwent lip-syncing. Chris Richards of The Washington Post stated "even at its breathiest, that delicate voice hasn't lost the laserlike precision."

== Legacy ==
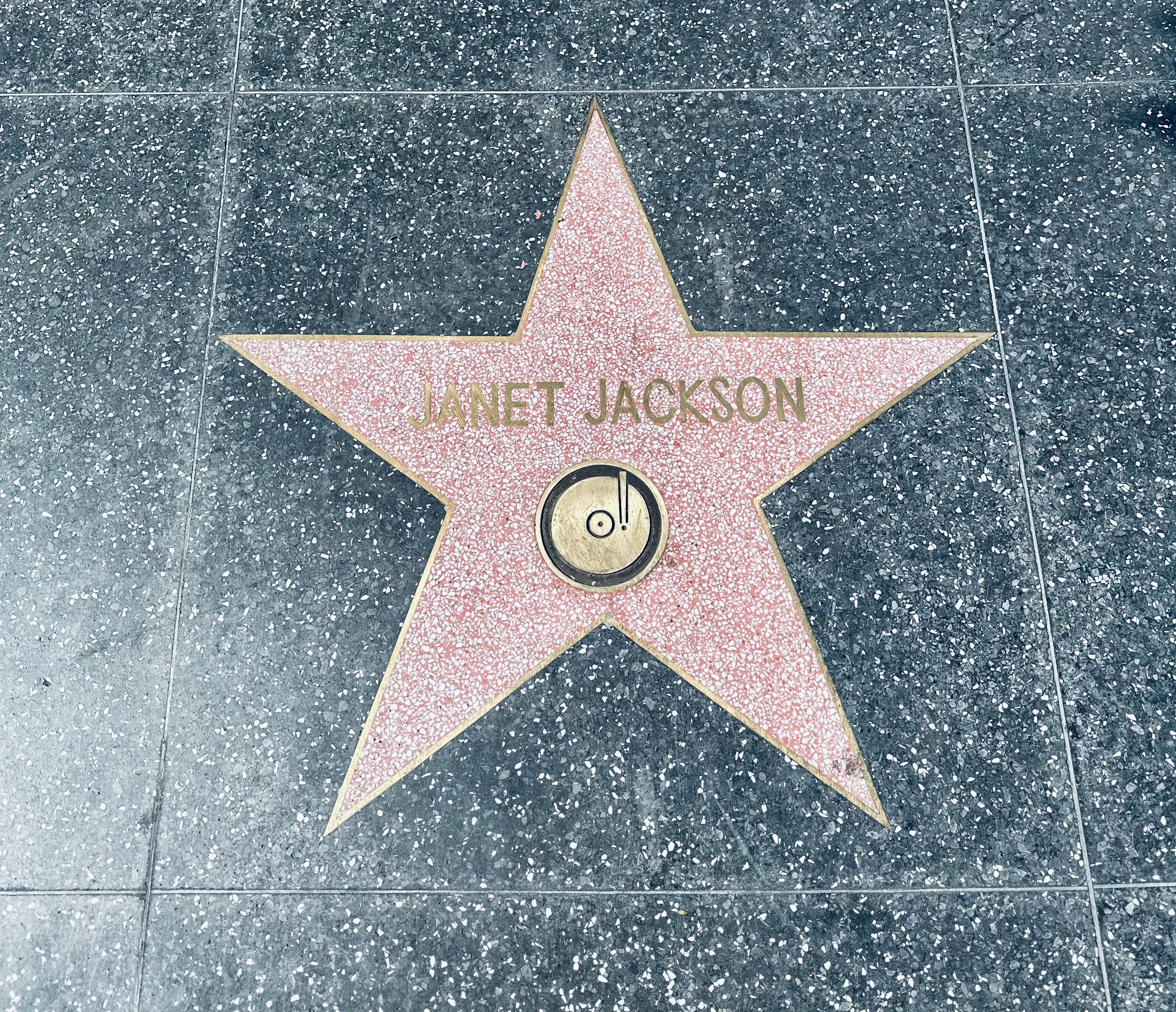
Jackson's star on the Hollywood Walk of Fame

The youngest sister of the "precious Jackson clan", Jackson has striven to distance her professional career from that of her older brother Michael and the rest of the Jackson family. Steve Dollar of Newsday wrote that "[s]he projects that home girl-next-door quality that belies her place as the youngest sibling in a family whose inner and outer lives have been as poked at, gossiped about, docudramatized and hard-copied as the Kennedys." Phillip McCarthy of The Sydney Morning Herald noted that throughout her recording career, one of her common conditions for interviewers has been that there would be no mention of Michael. Joshua Klein wrote, "[f]or the first half of her recording career, Janet Jackson sounded like an artist with something to prove. Emerging in 1982 just as big brother Michael was casting his longest shadow, Jackson filled her albums not so much with songs as with declarations, from 'The Pleasure Principle' to the radical-sounding 'Rhythm Nation' to the telling statement of purpose, 'Control'."

Jackson has sold over 100 million records, making her one of the world's best-selling music artists. Steve Huey of AllMusic asserted that despite being born into a family of entertainers, Jackson has managed to emerge a "superstar" in her own right, rivaling not only female recording artists including Madonna and Whitney Houston, but also her brother, while "successfully [shifting] her image from a strong, independent young woman to a sexy, mature adult". By forging her own unique identity through her artistry and her business ventures, she has been esteemed as the "Queen of Pop". Klein argued that "stardom was not too hard to predict, but few could have foreseen that Janet—Miss Jackson, if you're nasty—would one day replace Michael as true heir to the Jackson family legacy.".

Jackson has also been recognized for playing a pivotal role in crossing racial boundaries in the recording industry, where black artists were once considered to be substandard. Author Maureen Mahon states: "In the 1980s, Whitney Houston, Michael Jackson, Janet Jackson, and Prince were among the African American artists who crossed over ... When black artists cross over into pop success they cease to be black in the industry sense of the word. They get promoted from racialized black music to universal pop music in an economically driven process of racial transcendence." The Routledge International Encyclopedia of Women: Global Women's Issues and Knowledge documented that Jackson, along with other prominent African-American women, had achieved financial breakthroughs in mainstream popular music, receiving "superstar status" in the process.

She, alongside her contemporaries "offered viable creative, intellectual, and business paths for establishing and maintaining agency, lyrical potency, marketing and ownership". Her business savvy has been compared to that of Madonna, gaining a level of autonomy which enables "creative latitude and access to financial resources and mass-market distribution". A model of reinvention, author Jessie Carney Smith wrote that "Janet has continued to test the limits of her transformative power", receiving accolades in music, film and concert tours throughout the course of her career.

Musicologist Richard J. Ripani identified Jackson as a leader in the development of contemporary R&B, as her music created a unique blend of genre and sound effects which ushered in the use of rap vocals into mainstream R&B. He also argues her signature song "Nasty" influenced the new jack swing genre developed by Teddy Riley. Leon McDermott of the Sunday Herald wrote: "Her million-selling albums in the 1980s helped invent contemporary R&B through Jimmy Jam and Terry Lewis's muscular, lean production; the sinuous grooves threaded through 1986's Control and 1989's Rhythm Nation 1814 are the foundation upon which today's hotshot producers and singers rely." On March 24, 2021, the Library of Congress added Rhythm Nation 1814 to the National Recording Registry's class of 2020, stating that the album still "resonates today".

Simon Reynolds described Jackson's collaborations with her record producers as a reinvention of the dance-pop genre, introducing a new sonic palate. Den Berry, Virgin Records CEO and Chairman stated: "Janet is the very embodiment of a global superstar. Her artistic brilliance and personal appeal transcend geographic, cultural and generational boundaries." In July 1999, she placed at number 77 on VH1's "100 Greatest Women of Rock and Roll". She also placed at number 134 on their list of the "200 Greatest Pop Culture Icons of All Time", number seven on the "100 Greatest Women In Music", and at number two on the "50 Greatest Women of the Video Era", behind Madonna.

In March 2008, Business Wire reported "Jackson is one of the top ten selling artists in the history of contemporary music; ranked by Billboard magazine as the ninth most successful act in rock and roll history, and the second most successful female artist in pop music history." She is the only female artist in the history of the Hot 100 to have 18 consecutive top ten hit singles, from "Miss You Much" (1989) to "I Get Lonely" (1998). In 2008, the magazine ranked her at number seven on their Hot 100 50th Anniversary "All-Time Top Artists", making her the third most successful female artist in the history of the chart, following Madonna and Mariah Carey.

In November 2010, Billboard released its "Top 50 R&B / Hip-Hop Artists of the Past 25 Years" list and ranked her at number five. She ranked as the top artist on the chart with 15 number ones from 1985 to 2010, garnering 27 top ten entries between 1985 and 2001, and 33 consecutive top 40 songs from 1985 through 2004. The magazine later ranked her at number 41 on its 2025 "Top 100 Women Artists of the 21st Century" list. A recipient of eleven Billboard Music Awards, she is one an elite group of musical acts, such as Madonna, Aerosmith, Garth Brooks and Eric Clapton, whom Billboard credits for "redefining the landscape of popular music".

In November 2014, Jackson was voted 'Queen of Pop' by a poll conducted online by VH1. In October 2015, she received her first nomination for induction into the Rock and Roll Hall of Fame and four years later was inducted to the Hall. Jackson's music and choreography have inspired numerous performers. Virgin Records executive Lee Trink expressed: "Janet is an icon and historic figure in our culture. She's one of those gifted artists that people look up to, that people emulate, that people want to believe in ... there's not that many superstars that stand the test of time."

Sarah Rodman of the Boston Herald remarked: "For every hand-fluttering, overwrought, melisma addict out there aping Mariah's dog calls, there's an equal number trying to match Jackson's bubbling grooves and fancy footwork, including Britney Spears, Aaliyah and Destiny's Child." Music critic Gene Stout commented she "has so broadly influenced a younger generation of performers, from Jennifer Lopez ... to Britney Spears, who has copied so many of Jackson's dance moves." NSYNC and Usher have credited her for teaching them how to develop stage show into theatrical performance.

Elysa Gardner of USA Today wrote: "Jackson claims not to be bothered by the brigade of barely post-adolescent baby divas who have been inspired by—and, in some cases, have flagrantly aped—the sharp, animated choreography and girlish but decidedly post-feminist feistiness that have long been hallmarks of her performance style." Adrienne Trier-Bieniek stated, "scholars trace the origins of pleasure as a Black feminist commitment within popular culture to Janet Jackson" who inspired the feminist perspective found in many pop stars' careers. Those who are considered to have followed in her footsteps have been referred to as "Janet-come-lately's". Sociologist Shayne Lee commented that "[a]s Janet enters the twilight of her reign as erotic Queen of Pop, Beyoncé emerges as her likely successor." Joan Morgan of Essence magazine remarked: "Jackson's Control, Rhythm Nation 1814 and janet. established the singer-dancer imprimatur standard in pop culture we now take for granted. So when you're thinking of asking Miss Jackson, 'What have you done for me lately?' remember that Britney, Ciara and Beyoncé live in the house that Janet built."

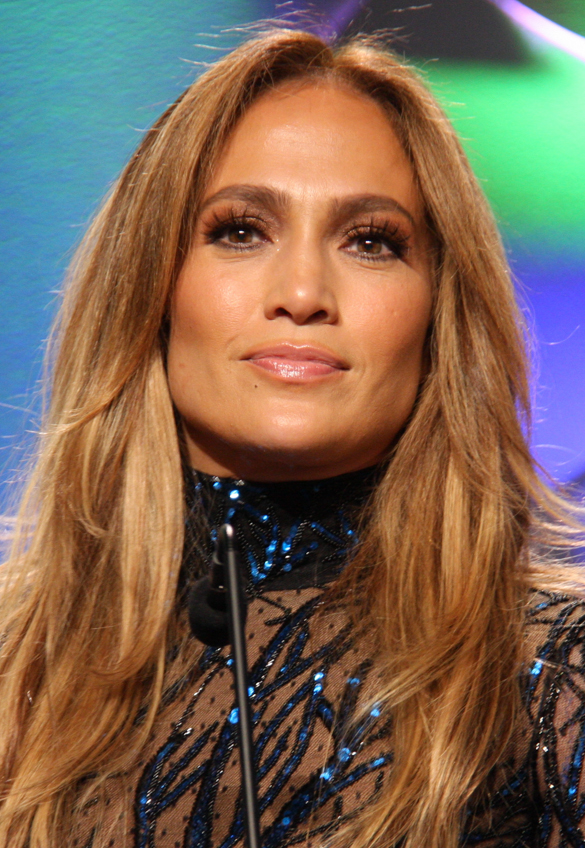
Musical artists such as Jennifer Lopez have been compared with Jackson's film career

Jackson has also been considered a primary example of a musician maintaining an acting career, setting a template for artists such as Jennifer Lopez. Dan Shanoff stated, "Before J-Lo even thought about being a singing-dancing-acting triple-threat... [Janet] was reinventing music videos, putting on a sick stage show and starring in both "Good Times" and "Diff'rent Strokes." MTV News observed her to inspire "a slew of singers" with her forays into film. Ashley Roberts stated, "I always kind of went to the artists who, like Janet Jackson, was an artist, but would go off and do film," while Kat Graham commented, "looking up to artists like Janet Jackson... I just don't know why you can't do it both."

Jackson has inspired performances by a number of actors, including Brit Marling, Olivia Wilde, Kate Hudson in Something Borrowed, and Elizabeth Mathis in Tron: Legacy, who stated, "I got the part. So I owe it all to Janet." Tom Hanks praised the usage of Jackson's choreography within films. Jackson brought director Dominic Sena to prominence, leading him to direct films starring Brad Pitt and Angelina Jolie. Jessica Alba cited her as the inspiration for her role in Honey, saying, "I grew up falling in love with Janet Jackson videos... And I wanted to be part of that." Jenna Dewan credits dancing with Jackson as the platform to star in Step Up. She also influenced actors Michael K. Williams and Carmen Electra. Her choreography has also been incorporated in numerous Bollywood films.

Jackson's debut in Poetic Justice has inspired several trends. PopMatters said its spoken poetry theme started "the spoken word explosion," influencing films such as Love Jones and Slam!. The Fader considered Jackson's image as Justice iconic, declaring it "one hell of a defining, iconoclastic moment that sticks in our brains and eventually disseminated through-and-through society." Her box braids in the film have become known as "Janet Jackson Braids," setting fashion trends. An anecdote stated, "celebrities continue to embrace Janet's look and continue to evoke the memory of John Singleton's classic character and film." Artists such as Beyoncé and Solange Knowles were observed to emulate Jackson's braids. Nylon considered it the film's most iconic feature, comparing Jennifer Lawrence's "side-winding French plait" in The Hunger Games to the style.

== Personal life ==
At age 18, Janet Jackson eloped with singer James DeBarge in September 1984. The marriage was annulled in November 1985. In 1986, Jackson began dating dancer, songwriter, and director René Elizondo Jr. In March 1991, Jackson secretly married Elizondo. After separating in January 1999, their marriage became public knowledge when Elizondo filed for divorce in May 2000. Elizondo reportedly sued Jackson for $10 million. The legal battle concluded with a settlement, and the divorce was finalized in October 2003. From September 2002 to 2009, Jackson was in a relationship with music producer, rapper, and songwriter Jermaine Dupri to whom Jackson later revealed to have been engaged.

Jackson was introduced to Qatari businessman Wissam Al Mana in October 2006, and began dating him in 2010. The couple became engaged and married privately in 2012. In January 2017, aged 50, Jackson gave birth to their son, Eissa Al Mana. In April 2017, it was reported that the couple had separated and were pursuing a divorce, which was announced by Jackson the following month.

== Discography ==
Studio albums

- Janet Jackson (1982)
- Dream Street (1984)
- Control (1986)
- Janet Jackson's Rhythm Nation 1814 (1989)
- Janet (1993)
- The Velvet Rope (1997)
- All for You (2001)
- Damita Jo (2004)
- 20 Y.O. (2006)
- Discipline (2008)
- Unbreakable (2015)

== Filmography ==
- Rhythm Nation 1814 (1989)
- Poetic Justice (1993)
- Nutty Professor II: The Klumps (2000)
- Why Did I Get Married? (2007)
- Why Did I Get Married Too? (2010)
- For Colored Girls (2010)

== Tours and residencies ==
Concert tours

- Rhythm Nation World Tour 1990 (1990)
- Janet World Tour (1993–1995)
- The Velvet Rope Tour (1998–1999)
- All for You Tour (2001–2002)
- Rock Witchu Tour (2008)
- Number Ones, Up Close and Personal World Tour (2011)
- Unbreakable World Tour (2015–2016)
- State of the World Tour (2017–2019)
- Janet Jackson: A Special 30th Anniversary Celebration of Rhythm Nation (2019)
- Janet Jackson: Together Again (2023–2024)
- Janet Jackson Japan (2026)

Concert residencies

- Janet Jackson: Metamorphosis (2019)
- Janet Jackson: Las Vegas (2024–2025)

== Written works ==
- True You (2011)

== See also ==
- Honorific nicknames in popular music
- List of American Grammy Award winners and nominees
- List of artists who reached number one in the United States
- List of best-selling music artists
- List of best-selling music artists in the United States
- List of dancers
